= Nancy Nord =

American lawyer and government official

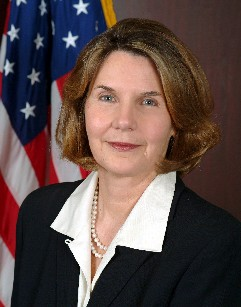

Commissioner, U.S. Consumer Product Safety Commission
- In office May 5, 2005 – October 27, 2013
- President: George W. Bush; Barack Obama
- Preceded by: Mary Sheila Gall
- Succeeded by: Joseph Mohorovic

Personal details
- Party: Republican
- Education: University of Nebraska–Lincoln; The George Washington University Law School

Nancy Ann Nord is an American lawyer and former commissioner of the U.S. Consumer Product Safety Commission (CPSC).

== Early life ==
Nord was born and raised in South Dakota. She earned a bachelor's degree from the University of Nebraska–Lincoln and a Juris Doctor degree from George Washington University.

Before joining the CPSC, Nord worked at the Eastman Kodak Company and the United States Chamber of Commerce. She also served as general counsel to the Council on Environmental Quality at the White House, an attorney at the Federal Communications Commission, and Republican counsel to the United States House Committee on Energy and Commerce. She also practiced law at the Washington, D.C., law firm of Verner, Liipfert, Bernhard, McPherson and Hand, and served as the first executive director of the American Corporate Counsel Association.

She is married to James S. Halpern, a senior judge on the United States Tax Court.

== Appointment ==
The U.S. Senate confirmed her appointment by President George W. Bush by voice vote on April 28, 2005. From July 2006 to June 2009, Nord served as Acting Chairman of the agency. She was initially succeeded as acting chairman by Thomas Hill Moore—a Democrat and the only other active commissioner at the time—until President Obama's nominee for the chairman's seat, Inez Tenenbaum, was appointed and confirmed. Nord's term concluded on October 26, 2012, but she remained on the Commission during the holdover year provided for under the Consumer Product Safety Act until October 26, 2013.

== Consumer Product Safety Commission ==
During her time at the CPSC as Acting Chairman, Nord came under scrutiny by Members of the United States Congress and the media for the agency's recall of large numbers of toys that violated the federal lead paint ban. These recalls lead to the passage of the Consumer Product Safety Improvement Act (CPSIA) in 2008. Nord was criticized when she questioned the wisdom of certain provisions of the legislation. Additionally, she received backlash for being a defender of industry and for slow implementation and restrictive interpretation of the new law. Regarding this debate, Nord stated in February 2008, "I will not tolerate this industry or any other not complying with our regulations. This problem must be fixed. We will be relentless with recalls and there is no reason why they can't certify that every toy has been designed for safety."

Nord has criticized the CPSIA for ambiguous provisions, unrealistic deadlines, and lack of foresight, asking Congress to address the "chaos and confusion". In 2009, Nord and Commissioner Thomas Moore voted on a stay of enforcement of the lead content provisions of the CPSIA for youth ATVs and mini bikes. The rationale was that children would ride on adult machines if smaller versions were not available due to excess levels of lead, and that the risk of vehicular injury was greater than the risk of lead poisoning.

Nord has also voted for delays in enforcement of certain provisions of the Act, citing a need for time to further interpret the law and industry to come into compliance. Nord's decisions on the CPSIA were supported by the other commissioner and the commission's lawyers. The first 23 commission votes on the CPSIA were unanimous with a vote of 2-0. Nord requested more funds for CPSC to better implement the law. As a result, additional funding was appropriated to the agency in March 2009, six months after the CPSIA was signed into law.

During Nord's time at CPSC, the agency efforts to address import safety included negotiating agreements with China and other exporting countries, establishing a port surveillance program, expanding the laboratory facilities of the agency and creating the first CPSC international office in Beijing.
