= Douglas Dziak =

American government official

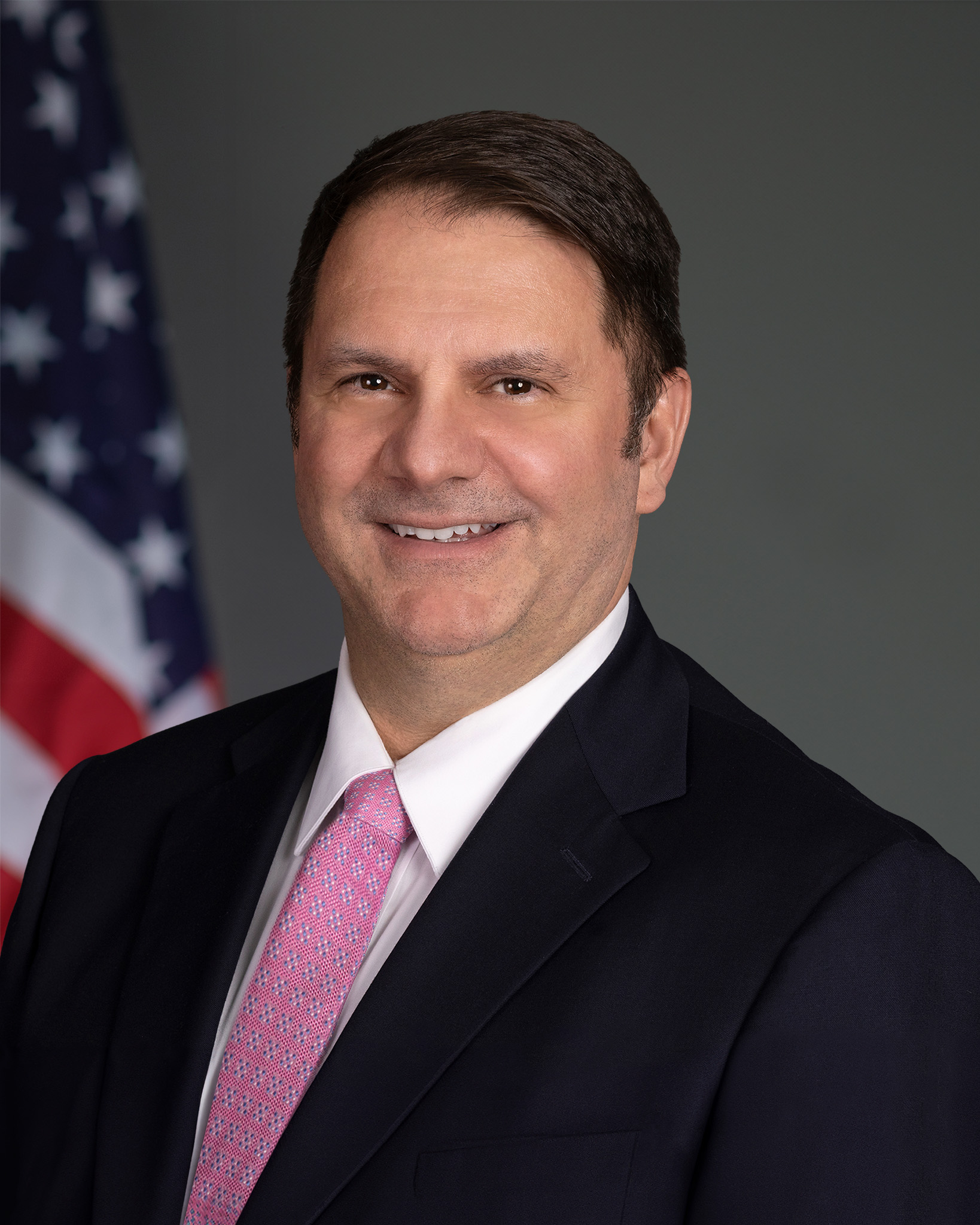
- Official portrait, 2024

Commissioner of the U.S. Consumer Product Safety Commission
- In office March 24, 2024 – August 24, 2025
- President: Donald Trump; Joe Biden
- Preceded by: Dana Baiocco
- Succeeded by: Brien Lorenze

Personal details
- Party: Republican
- Education: Ohio University BA, MA College of William and Mary JD

Douglas Dziak is an American attorney and former U.S. government official that served on the United States Consumer Product Safety Commission from March 2024 through August 2025.

Dziak was nominated by President Joe Biden in March, 2023 and confirmed by voice vote in the U.S. Senate one year later in March, 2024.

== Early life and education ==
Originally from Ohio, Dziak graduated summa cum laude with a Bachelors of Arts in Economics and English from Ohio University. He continued his education at Ohio University, culminating in a Masters in Economics.

He obtained a juris doctorate from the College of William and Mary School of Law.

He is a first generation college graduate.

== Career ==
Commissioner Dziak spent more than 15 years in private practice working as a regulatory attorney for several international law firms.

Before serving as commissioner, Dziak joined CPSC in 2021 as Chief Counsel to then-Commissioner Peter Feldman.

Prior to joining CPSC, he served as the Majority Staff Director on the U.S. Senate Committee on the Budget and as Legislative Director for Senators Michael B. Enzi and George V. Voinovich. He also served as General Counsel on Senator Voinovich's subcommittee on the U.S. Senate Committee on Homeland Security and Governmental Affairs.

After leaving CPSC, he joined the DC-based lobbying firm Invariant.

=== Consumer Product Safety Commission ===
As a commissioner, Dziak increased scrutiny of online third party commerce platforms, calling for investigations into large, foreign platforms like Shein and Temu. He also placed focused on products that affected vulnerable populations, including the elderly and infants.

== Personal life ==
He lives in Virginia with his wife and their rescue dogs.
