= Joseph Mohorovic =

American politician

Joseph P. Mohorovic
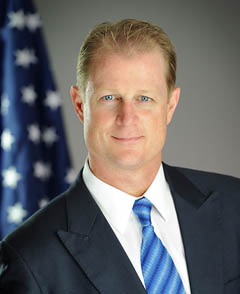

Commissioner, U.S. Consumer Product Safety Commission
- In office July 28, 2014 – October 20, 2017
- President: Barack Obama; Donald Trump
- Preceded by: Nancy Nord
- Succeeded by: Peter Feldman

Personal details
- Party: Republican
- Education: University of Texas at Austin; University of New Mexico

Joseph P. Mohorovic was a member of the U.S. Consumer Product Safety Commission. He resigned from the Commission effective October 20, 2017, to join a law firm and work in Chicago and Washington, D.C.

Before taking office as commissioner, Mohorovic was an executive at the testing firm Intertek, and previously worked as a member of the staff of then-CPSC Chairman Hal Stratton. Before that, he served as a member of the New Mexico House of Representatives. He served as a cochair of the Illinois campaign of John Kasich.
