= Elliot F. Kaye =

Elliot Kaye
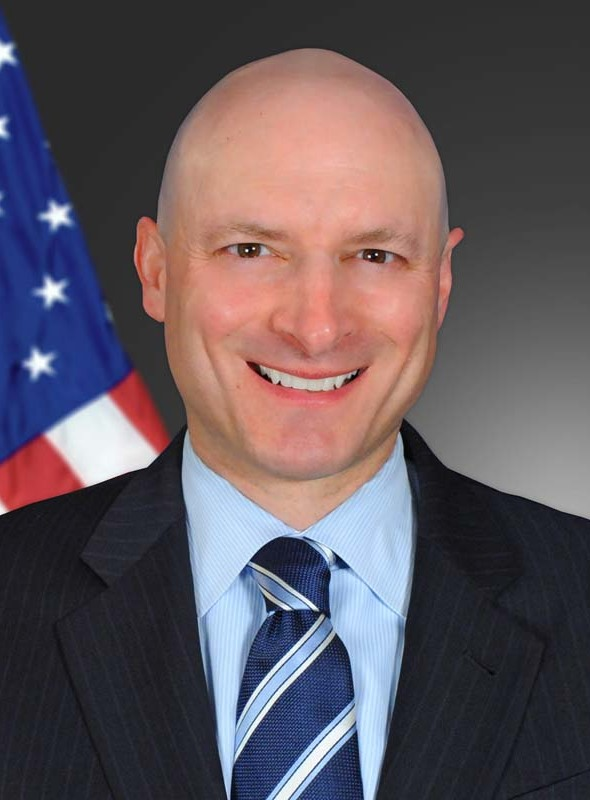

Chairman of the U.S. Consumer Product Safety Commission
- In office July 31, 2014 – February 8, 2017
- President: Barack Obama; Donald Trump
- Preceded by: Robert S. Adler (acting)
- Succeeded by: Ann Marie Buerkle (acting)

Commissioner of the U.S. Consumer Product Safety Commission
- In office July 31, 2014 – August 27, 2021
- President: Barack Obama; Donald Trump; Joe Biden
- Preceded by: Inez Tenenbaum
- Succeeded by: Alexander Hoehn-Saric

Personal details
- Party: Democratic
- Education: Northwestern University (BS); New York University (JD)

Elliot F. Kaye is a former chairman of the U.S. Consumer Product Safety Commission. He served as a commissioner of the agency from 2014 through 2021, and was chairman from 2014 to 2017 under the Obama administration, directing the U.S. government's oversight and recall of everyday products that can cause injury or death.

== Early life ==
Kaye was born in 1969 in Huntington, New York, the son of Robert Kaye (1940-2019), the president of a uniform manufacturing company, and Elayne (née Schlesinger, 1941–1996), a homemaker. The family was Jewish. Kaye attended Friends Academy in Glen Cove, N.Y., where he was a standout sprinter and ran in the 1987 Penn Relays. He earned a degree in journalism from the Medill School of Journalism at Northwestern University in 1991, and a J.D. degree from the New York University School of Law in 2004.

== Early career ==
After graduating from Northwestern, Kaye worked on staff for three U.S. representatives – Earl Hutto (D, Fla.), Pat Danner (D, Mo.), and John F. Tierney (D, Mass.) – before graduating from law school. He then joined the New York firm of Kronish Lieb.

Kaye received national attention in 2007 for his pro bono representation of Salifou Yankene, a 17-year-old refugee from the Ivory Coast, who escaped to the United States after years of being a forced child soldier for rebel troops engaged in an ethnic civic war. (Yankene's father had been assassinated when he was 12.) While building his case with the resistant U.S. government that Yankene was not a threat but a victim, and should not be forced to return to the Ivory Coast, Kaye allowed Yankene to sleep on the couch in his Brooklyn apartment. Yankene told the New York Times: “Elliot said, ‘Life is giving you a second chance.’ All I wanted was death. Little by little, Elliot changed that.”

In 2008, Kaye temporarily stepped away from private practice to work on voter protection in Ohio for the Obama campaign. He joined the CPSC in 2010 as senior counsel to then-chairman Inez Tenenbaum. He later became chief of staff, chief counsel and then executive director. In March 2014, he was nominated by President Obama and confirmed in July by the U.S. Senate to become CPSC chairman.

== Consumer Product Safety Commission ==
During his career at the CPSC, Kaye has been recognized for taking special interest in what he called “persistent, deadly hazards” to children. He targeted small, high-powered magnets that youngsters swallowed, whereupon the magnets ripped internal organ tissue. The agency engineered the regulation of blinds and other window coverings whose cords, because they could entangle children by the neck, led to more than a dozen deaths annually. Kaye told the NYU Alumni web site: “We’re trying to get companies even more oriented toward recognizing how challenging parenting is, and how overwhelmed parents are. We want companies, when they’re designing products, to think more about what a parent is going through, and not to rely on some very technical warning label to solve the problem.”

Following a 2010 New York Times expose on glaring safety failings of football helmets, Kaye worked with officials from the National Football League, Major League Baseball, and other professional sports leagues to raise awareness of the dangers of brain injuries and the limitations of safety products. “There’s no product right now that has been designed and proven to be concussion-proof,” Kaye said. “There’s not a simple regulatory solution, it’s really more about using the influence of the office to bring people together to try to drive culture change at the youth level.”

In 2015 and 2016, the CPSC collected a total of $57.6 million in civil penalties from manufacturers and retailers, far more than in any prior period in the agency's history. Examples included Office Depot ($3.4 million, office chairs); Johnson Health Tech ($3 million, fitness equipment); Philips Lighting ($2 million, fluorescent lamps); and Teavana ($3.75 million, tea tumblers). However, these settlements between the CPSC and the companies included no admission of wrongdoing. Kaye received some criticism from industry and Republicans for not detailing why some fines were higher than others.

The highest-profile case Kaye spearheaded as CPSC chairman was that of the Samsung Galaxy Note 7 phone, whose lithium-ion batteries from a specific supplier could overheat and catch fire. The CPSC issued an official recall of about 1 million phones in September 2016, and a month later the phone was banned from being brought onto all U.S. aircraft. Some Wall Street analysts estimated that Samsung would lose at least $17 billion in revenue from the incident.

Kaye served as CPSC Chairman until February 2017, when the Trump White House removed him and installed Ann Marie Buerkle in an acting capacity. He remained one of the agency's five commissioners until August 27, 2021.

Political offices
Preceded by Inez Tenenbaum	Commissioner of the United States Consumer Product Safety Commission; 2014–present	Incumbent
Preceded by Robert S. Adler; Acting	Chairman of the United States Consumer Product Safety Commission; 2014–2017	Succeeded by Ann Marie Buerkle; Acting
