= Inez Tenenbaum =

American lawyer and politician

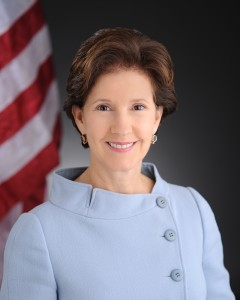

Chair of the United States Consumer Product Safety Commission
- In office June 23, 2009 – November 29, 2013
- President: Barack Obama
- Preceded by: Thomas Hill Moore (Acting)
- Succeeded by: Robert Adler (Acting)

South Carolina Superintendent of Education
- In office January 13, 1999 – January 9, 2007
- Governor: Jim Hodges; Mark Sanford
- Preceded by: Barbara S. Nielsen
- Succeeded by: Jim Rex

Personal details
- Born: Inez Moore; March 8, 1951 (age 75) Hawkinsville, Georgia, U.S.
- Party: Democratic
- Education: University of Georgia (BA, MA); University of South Carolina (JD)

Inez Tenenbaum (née Moore; born March 8, 1951) is an American lawyer and politician who served as South Carolina Superintendent of Education and as chairperson of the U.S. Consumer Product Safety Commission. In 2016, she joined a law firm. She is a member of the Democratic Party.

== Education ==
Tenenbaum was born in Hawkinsville, Georgia, obtained a Bachelor of Science in 1972 from the University of Georgia, and a Master's in Education two years later from the same university. She received a Juris Doctor degree from the University of South Carolina, Columbia in 1986, where she was an associate editor-in-chief of the South Carolina Law Review.

== Career ==
Originally a public school teacher, Tenenbaum entered state government as an employee of the South Carolina Department of Social Services. She later served as the director of research for the Medical, Military, Public and Municipal Affairs Committee of the South Carolina House of Representatives. She practiced with a private law firm, Sinkler & Boyd, P.A. from 1986 to 1992, in the areas of health, environment, and public interest law.

=== State Superintendent of Education ===
Tenenbaum was elected State Superintendent of Education in November 1998 and re-elected in November 2002. She focused her administration on six key initiatives to fuel education progress in South Carolina: raising the academic bar and embracing accountability for student academic progress, improving teacher quality, providing quality early childhood education for all children, supporting strong and effective school leadership, promoting safe and healthy schools, and increasing parent and community involvement.

During her tenure, the South Carolina General Assembly approved a $750 million school bond legislation for K-12 school construction and renovation, with local districts leveraging the bond amount to raise the total to $1.75 billion. More than 140 new schools were built under the act, using a combination of state and local voter-approved bonds.

In 2005, following parental complaints, Tenenbaum removed Chris Crutcher's book, Whale Talk, from the state's English reading list for middle grades. She was featured in an interview by John Stossel for a 20/20 Special Edition about public schools in the United States and world. Tenenbaum defended South Carolina's progress, noting that the state was rapidly narrowing the gap between its students' test scores and the national average.

By the end of her term in 2007, South Carolina was a key leader in the nation in education improvement. Five independent national studies—by the Fordham Foundation, Princeton Review, the Large-Scale Assessment Study, the Northwest Evaluation Association, Quality Counts, and Education Next,—indicated that South Carolina's standards for student academic proficiency under No Child Left Behind were among the most rigorous in the nation.

During her tenure, South Carolina's performance on the National Assessment of Education Progress (NAEP) showed top rankings for improvement:

- Math, Grade 4—Number 1 in the nation
- Math, Grade 8—Number 1 in the nation
- Science, Grade 4—Number 1 in the nation
- Science, Grade 8—Number 3 in the nation

Standard & Poor's identified South Carolina as an "outperformer" on NAEP for consistently achieving above the statistical expectations. The state's SAT scores increased 34 points over eight years (1999-2007), the largest ten-year gain in the nation. The 2007 national report card "Quality Counts," published by Education Week, ranked the state first in the nation in academic standards, assessment, and accountability. It ranked 11th in efforts to connect K-12 education with early learning, higher education, and the world of work. "Quality Counts" ranked the state first for improving teacher quality in 2003 and 2004, and number two for teacher quality improvements in 2005 and 2006.

Tenenbaum was succeeded as Superintendent of Education by Democrat Jim Rex on January 10, 2007.

=== Consumer Products Safety Commission ===
On May 5, 2009, President Barack Obama announced that he would nominate Tenenbaum to head the United States Consumer Product Safety Commission. She was confirmed in that position by the U.S. Senate unanimously on June 19, 2009. On February 28, 2013 Tenenbaum announced that she will not seek renomination when her term expires in October 2013.

In 2009, the CPSC established its first overseas office in the U.S. Embassy in Beijing. In the same year, it created an Internet Surveillance Unit to aid in marketplace surveillance of retail and Internet auction sites to identify sellers offering banned, recalled, or dangerous products.

In October 2010, Tenenbaum announced a five-year strategic plan (2011–2016), which established a new mission and vision for the Commission. Also in 2010, under her leadership, the CPSC made the Office of Education, Global Outreach, and Small Business Ombudsman to facilitate outreach to domestic and international stakeholders, including manufacturers, retailers, resellers, small businesses, and foreign governments.

In 2011, the CPSC opened the new National Product Testing and Evaluation Center (NPTEC), testing products for defects and developing methods to determine compliance with safety standards. In October 2011, the CPSC led the first North American Consumer Product Safety Summit with Canada and Mexico. In March 2011, it launched the publicly available Consumer Product Safety Information Database, SaferProducts.gov. In 2011, it implemented a Risk Assessment Methodology (RAM) pilot project that to analyze data available in Custom and Border Protection's International Trade Data System (ITDS) to target potentially violative products coming into the United States.

The CPSC obtained more than 1,800 recalls between 2009 and 2012. In 2012, the CPSC conducted 439 recalls involving more than 91 million units from around the world. In the same year, it screened over 17,000 models of imported consumer products at U.S. ports. In 2012, it began its International Extended Training Exchange Program.

In 2012, in collaboration with consumer product regulators in Australia, Japan, Korea, and New Zealand, CPSC, along with KidSafe, organized a multijurisdictional symposium on technical solutions to eliminate or mitigate the hazards posed by ingested button batteries.

In 2012, the CPSC began a public-private collaboration to work on lowering the risk of concussions and other mild traumatic brain injuries at the youth football level. The "Youth Football Brain Safety" initiative involved major companies that manufacture or recondition football helmets, industry associations, the National Football League (NFL) and its Players Association, USA Football, the Centers for Disease Control and Prevention (CDC), and the National Collegiate Athletic Association (NCAA). Through private funding, the program provides assistance to football programs for economically disadvantaged youth, outfitting their players in newer and properly maintained helmets.

As of September 30, 2012, the CPSC completed 96 Consumer Product Safety Improvement Act (CPSIA)-related rulemaking activities since the passage of the CPSIA in 2008, including 40 final rules and 20 accreditation requirements.

The CPSC launched a campaign in 2013 to reduce drowning risks for children. The CPSC began an investigation into the safety concerns of liquid laundry packets that have been swallowed by children in April 2013. In November 2013, the CPSC worked with U.S. Customs and Border Protection to seize more than 200,000 toy dolls that were made in China and contained banned chemical compounds.

During her tenure at the CPSC, Tenenbaum made regulations for children's products, created a public database to catalog product safety complaints, and put in place mandatory standards for children's beds, cribs, and swings. In 2013, she stepped down from her role with the CPSC to take a job with the law firm Nelson Mullins Riley & Scarborough LLP.

== 2004 U.S. Senate run ==
Tenenbaum was the Democratic candidate in the 2004 election for retiring Democrat Fritz Hollings's seat in the U.S. Senate; she lost to Republican nominee Jim DeMint by 152,783 votes.

== Law firm ==
In 2016, she announced she would join the law firm of Wyche, P.A. Her practice focuses on consumer product safety and risk management, working particularly with manufacturers and retailers of consumer products to ensure compliance with applicable consumer product safety requirements and to protect the client's brand.

=== Awards ===
In 2001, The Center for Creative Leadership, a nonprofit education institution in Greensboro, North Carolina, named Inez Tenenbaum the recipient of its third annual Distinguished Alumni Award for "making leadership a fundamental requirement for school reform as part of South Carolina's strategic plan for education."

In 2009, Washingtonian Magazine listed Inez Tenenbaum as one of the 100 Most Powerful Women in Washington, DC.

== Personal ==
Tenenbaum and her husband Samuel Tenenbaum reside in Lexington, South Carolina. She is Methodist, and her husband is Jewish.

Political offices
Preceded by Barbara Nielsen	South Carolina Superintendent of Education; 1999–2007	Succeeded by Jim Rex
Party political offices
Preceded by Sylvia Weinberg	Democratic nominee for South Carolina Superintendent of Education; 1998, 2002	Succeeded by Jim Rex
Preceded by Ernest Hollings	Democratic nominee for U.S. Senator from South Carolina (Class 3); 2004	Succeeded by Alvin Greene
Government offices
Preceded by Hal Stratton	Commissioner of the Consumer Product Safety Commission; 2009–2013	Succeeded by Elliot Kaye
Preceded by Thomas Moore; Acting	Chair of the Consumer Product Safety Commission; 2009–2013	Succeeded by Robert Adler; Acting
