= Richard Trumka Jr. =

American government official

Rich Trumka
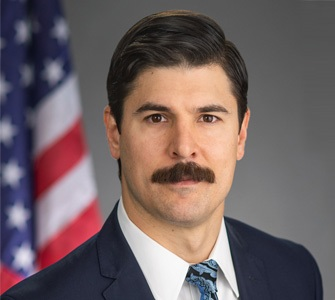

Commissioner of the U.S. Consumer Product Safety Commission
- In office December 2, 2021 – July 23, 2025; Suspended: May 19, 2025 – June 13, 2025 (Note: Trumka was fired by President Donald Trump on May 19, 2025 but was reinstated alongside two other fired commission members by a ruling by US District Court judge Matthew Maddox which used Humphrey’s Executor v. United States (1935) as precendent. This ruling was overturned by a 6-3 emergency order by the US Supreme Court on July 23, 2025.)
- President: Joe Biden; Donald Trump
- Preceded by: Robert S. Adler
- Succeeded by: TBD

Personal details
- Born: Richard Louis Trumka Jr. 1984 or 1985 (age 41–42)
- Party: Democratic
- Relatives: Richard Trumka (father)
- Education: Cornell University (BS); Georgetown University (JD)

Richard Louis Trumka Jr. (born 1984 or 1985) is an American lawyer and government official who served as a member of the U.S. Consumer Product Safety Commission from December 2, 2021 to July 23, 2025.

== Early life, education and career ==
Trumka was born c. 1984 as the only child of prominent labor leader Richard Trumka and his wife, Barbara Vidovich Trumka. He received his undergraduate degree from Cornell University, where he played football, and his Juris Doctor degree from Georgetown University Law Center.

Early in his career, Trumka worked as an assistant attorney general in the consumer protection division of the Office of the Maryland Attorney General. In 2019, he became general counsel and staff director of the Economic and Consumer Policy Subcommittee of the House Committee on Oversight and Reform, where he led investigations into teenage use of e-cigarettes and the presence of toxic heavy metals in baby food.

== Consumer Product Safety Commission ==
Trumka was nominated to a seven-year term on the CPSC by President Joe Biden in July 2021. His nomination was unanimously confirmed by the Senate in November of that year and he took office on December 2, 2021. On the commission, Trumka worked to pass child safety rule, including rules related to pull cords of window coverings and the prevention of swallowing magnets.

On May 9, 2025, President Donald Trump fired Trumka and two other Democratic members of the commission. On June 13, 2025, Judge Matthew J. Maddox of the U.S. District Court for the District of Maryland ruled that their dismissals were improper and reinstated them to the commission. On July 23, 2025, the Supreme Court of the United States, in a 6-3 emergency ruling for the case Donald J. Trump v. Mary Boyle (2025), overturned Maddox's ruling and allow the firing of Trumka and the two other Democratic members from the commission

=== Gas stove controversy ===
In December 2022, Trumka triggered a political controversy over the use and regulation of gas stoves. During a virtual event, Trumka said that the CPSC would issue a request for information on hazards, particularly related to indoor air quality, of the appliances. "This public request for information is the first step in what could be a long journey toward regulating gas stoves," Trumka said, according to The Hill, adding that "We could get a regulation on the books before this time next year." According to The Hill, Trumka also said that an "outright ban" on new gas stoves was "a real possibility." In a January 2023 interview with Bloomberg, Trumka described gas stoves as "a hidden hazard," adding that "[a]ny option is on the table. Products that can’t be made safe can be banned."

Many political people and institutions on the right and center—including Senator Joe Manchin (D-West Virginia); Reps. Ronny Jackson (R-Texas), Jim Jordan, and Gary Palmer (R-Alabama); Florida Gov. Ron DeSantis; Fox News personalities Sean Hannity and Tucker Carlson; and the Heritage Foundation—as well as the American Gas Association took issue with Trumka's comments and the proposal that the CPSC take action up and including a ban on gas stoves. On Twitter, Manchin described it as "a recipe for disaster. The federal government has no business telling American families how to cook their dinner. I can tell you the last thing that would ever leave my house is the gas stove that we cook on." Natural gas analyst Steve Everley published an analysis challenging the design of the study most commonly cited about the dangers of gas stoves.

To quell the controversy, CPSC Chairman Alexander Hoehn-Saric issued a statement that "I am not looking to ban gas stoves and the CPSC has no proceeding to do so," and the White House issued a statement that President Biden "does not support banning gas stoves – and the Consumer Product Safety Commission, which is independent, is not banning gas stoves." Subsequent news reports indicated that the CPSC might pursue so-called compromises, including requiring hoods for all gas stoves, setting performance standards for hoods or requiring that gas stoves have sensors for certain pollutant concentrations. Later in 2023, the House Energy and Commerce Committee advanced legislation (H.R. 1615) that would bar the CPSC from using taxpayer funds for a gas stove ban; the bill cleared the committee with bipartisan support.

== Personal life ==
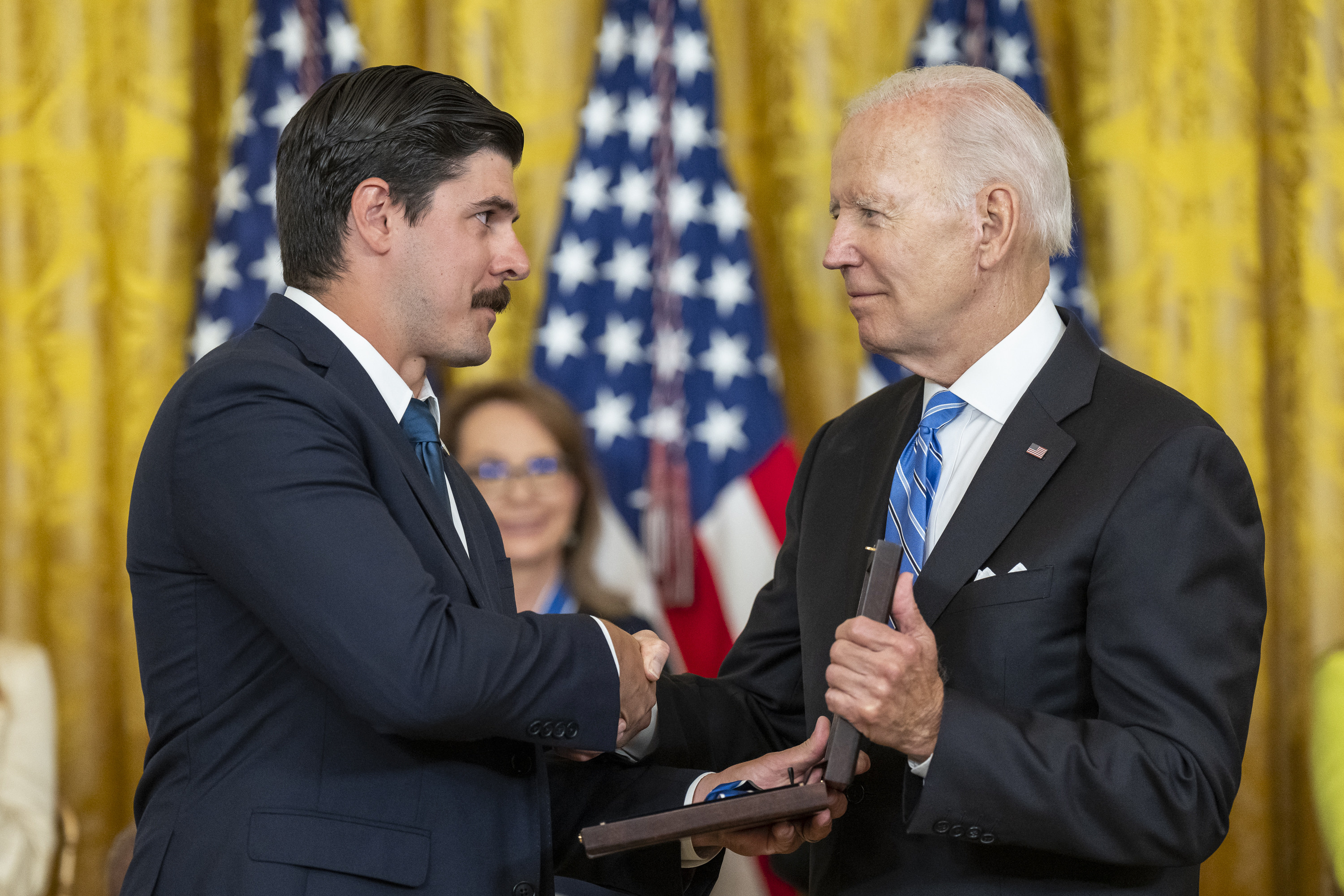
Trumka (left) accepts the Presidential Medal of Freedom presented posthumously to his late father in July 2022.

Trumka is married and has two young children. In July 2022, he accepted the Presidential Medal of Freedom that Biden conferred posthumously on his late father. His hobbies include woodworking.

== Notes ==
Political offices
Preceded by Robert S. Adler	Commissioner of the United States Consumer Product Safety Commission; 2021–present	Incumbent
