= Marietta S. Robinson =

American politician (born 1951)

Marti Robinson
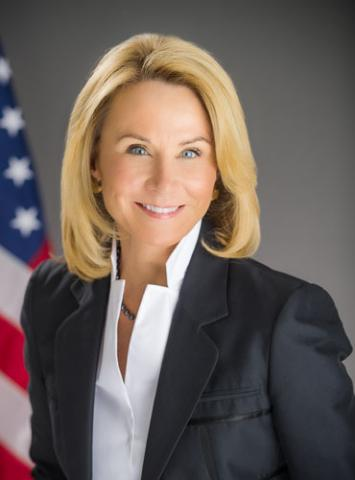

Commissioner of the United States Consumer Product Safety Commission
- In office July 2, 2013 – June 2018
- President: Barack Obama
- Preceded by: Thomas Hill Moore
- Succeeded by: Dana Baiocco

Personal details
- Born: Marietta Lunette Sebree; December 26, 1951 (age 74) Platteville, Wisconsin, U.S.
- Party: Democratic
- Education: University of Michigan–Flint (BA); University of California, Los Angeles (JD)

Marietta Sebree "Marti" Robinson (born December 26, 1951) is an American lawyer and former political candidate in Michigan and California. She is a former Commissioner of the U.S. Consumer Product Safety Commission.

== Education ==
She graduated from the University of Michigan–Flint with a Bachelor of Arts in 1973 and from the University of California, Los Angeles with a Juris Doctor in 1978.

== Career ==
=== Early career ===
From 1973 to 1975 she was a data processing marketing representative for the IBM Corporation in Flint, Michigan and Glendale, California. She held several parti-time jobs while a student, including keypuncher, Winkleman's sales representative, nurses' aide, and waitress for Beachbum Bert's in Redondo Beach, California.

=== Legal career ===
In the summer of 1976 she was a law clerk with the law firm of Anderson, Patch Rosenfeld, Potter and Grover in Jackson, Michigan. In the summer of 1977 she was a research assistant to Michael Murphy, in-house counsel of the American International Group, Inc. (AIG) in Hamilton, Bermuda. From 1978 to 1979 she was in-house legal counsel for the Bank of Bermuda Limited in Hamilton. From 1979 to 1984, she practiced law as an associate and then a partner with the Michigan law firm of Dickinson Wright, Moon, Van Dusen and Freeman (now Dickinson Wright PLLC) in Detroit, and from 1985 - 1989, she was a shareholder in the law firm of Sommers Schwartz in Southfield, Michigan. From 1989 to 2013 she practiced law with her own law firm in Detroit, Birmingham and Lake Orion, Michigan. From 1982 to 1984 she was an adjunct professor of Law in Trial Practice at the University of Detroit Mercy School of Law in Detroit, Michigan and at the Wayne State University Law School in Detroit and, in 2011, at Duke Law School.

=== Political career ===
In early 2013, she was nominated by President Obama as commissioner of the U.S. Consumer Product Safety Commission and approved by the Senate in June 2013. She served in that position until June 2018. In 1985 Governor James Blanchard appointed her to the Michigan Building Authority, which she served on until 1989. In 2000 she was nominated by the Michigan Democratic Party for the Michigan Supreme Court to run against incumbent Chief Justice Clifford Taylor and was unsuccessful. In 2002 she was a candidate for the Democratic nomination for Michigan Attorney General, but withdrew her name before the convention. In 2008, she served as co-chair of Michigan Women for Obama. In 2009, she was appointed by Michigan Senators Carl Levin and Debbie Stabenow as a member of the Judicial Advisory Committee for the Eastern District of Michigan. In 2011, she served as independent legal counsel to the Chair of the United Nations Peacebuilding Commission in Liberia.

=== Other activities ===
From 1989 to 1997 she was a federally-appointed trustee of the Dalkon Shield Claimants’ Trust which disbursed over $2.4 billion to more than 300,000 claimants in more than 120 countries. She is a Professorial Lecturer in Law at the George Washington University Law School in Washington, DC. She was a 2019 Fellow at the Harvard University Advanced Leadership Initiative and Distinguished Fellow for Consumer Protection at the American Constitution Society. She is on the Board of Managerial Trustees of the International Association of Women Judges. She is a Fellow and was the first woman president of the International Society of Barristers. In 2015, she was a speaker in the Distinguished Speaker Series of the World Bank Executive Committee. She is a Fellow of the American and Michigan Bar Associations, is a Member in the International Women's Foundation and has been listed for more than 20 years in Who's Who in The World, In America, in American Law and of American Women.
