= Richard Trumka =

American attorney and organized labor leader (1949–2021)

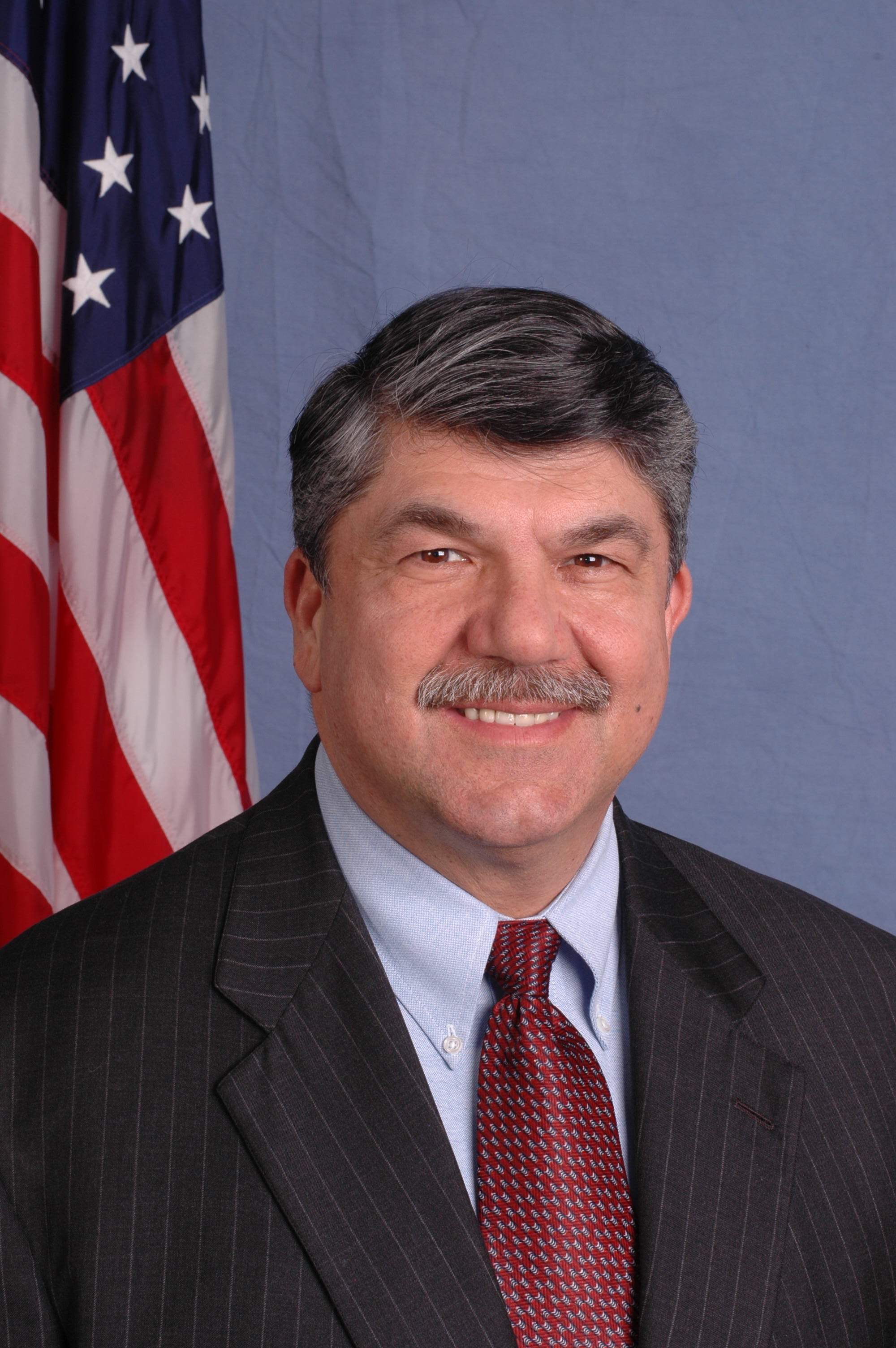
- Trumka in 2010

5th President of the AFL–CIO
- In office September 16, 2009 – August 5, 2021
- Preceded by: John Sweeney
- Succeeded by: Liz Shuler

5th Secretary-Treasurer of the AFL–CIO
- In office 1995–2009
- Preceded by: Barbara Easterling
- Succeeded by: Liz Shuler

14th President of the United Mine Workers
- In office 1982–1995
- Preceded by: Sam Church
- Succeeded by: Cecil Roberts

Personal details
- Born: Richard Louis Trumka; July 24, 1949 Nemacolin, Pennsylvania, U.S.
- Died: August 5, 2021 (aged 72)
- Spouse: Barbara Vidovich (m. 1982)
- Children: Rich
- Education: Pennsylvania State University (BS); Villanova University (JD)
- Awards: Presidential Medal of Freedom (2022)

Richard Louis Trumka (July 24, 1949 – August 5, 2021) was an American attorney and organized labor leader. He served as president of the United Mine Workers from 1982 to 1995, and then was secretary-general of the AFL-CIO from 1995 to 2009. He was elected president of the AFL-CIO on September 16, 2009, at the federation's convention in Pittsburgh, and served in that position until his death.

== Early life and education ==
Trumka was born on July 24, 1949, in Nemacolin, Pennsylvania, near Pittsburgh, to an Italian-American mother, Eola Elizabeth (née Bertugli), and a second-generation Polish-American father, coal miner Frank Richard Trumka. He went to work in the mines in 1968. He received a Bachelor of Science degree from Pennsylvania State University in 1971 and a Juris Doctor from Villanova University School of Law in 1974.

== Career ==
=== Early career ===
From 1974 to 1979, Trumka was a staff attorney with the United Mine Workers of America (UMWA) at their headquarters in Washington, D.C. He was elected as the International Executive Board Member of UMWA from District 4 in 1981 and became president of the UMWA in 1982.

When Richard Trumka ran against incumbent United Mine Workers president Sam Church in 1982, a major factor in the election was the presence of about 3,000 newly hired women miners. These women had entered the mines only a few years earlier because of a successful 1978 sex‑discrimination complaint filed jointly by:

The U.S. Department of Labor’s Office of Federal Contract Compliance Programs (OFCCP)

The Coal Employment Project (CEP), a women’s advocacy organization

That complaint named 153 coal companies for discriminatory hiring practices. As a result, those companies were required to hire women miners, which dramatically changed the workforce composition by the early 1980s.

During the election campaign, Sam Church reportedly made an off‑color joke when women miners pressed him to include affirmative‑action provisions and better sickness/accident coverage in the union contract. This alienated many of the newly hired women miners, who then supported Trumka.

Under Trumka's tenure support for women miners changed substantially. The union officially endorsed the CEP Annual Conference, and Trumka was the keynote speaker in 1983. Trumka approved excused absences for women to attend CEP conferences and sent letters to local unions urging them to send women to the conferences.

While President of the UMWA, Trumka led a successful nine-month strike against the Pittston Coal Company in 1989, which became a symbol of resistance against employer cutbacks and retrenchment for the entire labor movement. A major issue in the dispute was Pittston's refusal to pay into the industry-wide health and retirement fund created in 1950. Trumka encouraged nonviolent civil disobedience to confront the company.

The United Mine Workers conducted a nationwide strike against Peabody Coal in 1993. Trumka was asked to respond to the possibility that some coal companies might hire permanent replacement workers. He told the Associated Press in September 1993, "I'm saying if you strike a match and you put your finger in it, you're likely to get burned." He also said, "That doesn't mean I'm threatening to burn you. That just means if you strike the match, and you put your finger in it, common sense will tell you it'll burn your finger. Common sense will tell you that in these strikes, that when you inject scabs, a number of things happen. And a confrontation is one of the potentials that can happen. Do I want it to happen? Absolutely not. Do I think it can happen? Yes, I think it can happen." The Associated Press reported that he was not threatening violence and that he had said that UMWA staff had spent "thousands of man hours trying to prevent anything from happening ... to our members or by our members."

Besides his domestic labor activities, Trumka established an office that raised U.S. mineworker solidarity with the miners in South Africa while they were fighting apartheid. He further helped organize the U.S. Shell boycott, which challenged the multinational Royal Dutch Shell Group for its continued business dealings in South Africa. For these steps, Trumka received the 1990 Letelier-Moffitt Human Rights Award.

=== AFL–CIO secretary-treasurer ===
As secretary-treasurer of the AFL–CIO, Trumka focused on creating investment programs for the pension and benefit funds of the labor movement, capital market strategies, and demanding corporate accountability to America's communities. He chaired the AFL–CIO Industrial Union Council, a consortium of manufacturing unions focusing on key issues in trade, health care, and labor law reform. He co-chaired the China Currency Coalition, an alliance of industry, agriculture, services, and worker organizations whose stated mission is to support U.S. manufacturing.

Trumka's tenure as secretary-treasurer was not without controversy. In 1996, Teamsters president Ron Carey was locked in a tight reelection battle with James P. Hoffa, son of disappeared Teamsters president Jimmy Hoffa and a long-time Teamsters union attorney. Hoffa was also out-raising Carey in funds by more than 4-to-1, but the Carey campaign was convinced it could win if the campaign could bypass the local leadership (which supported Hoffa) and get his message directly to Teamsters members. Martin Davis, a Carey campaign consultant who owned The November Group (a direct-marketing company), allegedly contacted Trumka in the summer of 1996 and concocted a scheme whereby the Teamsters would donate $150,000 to the AFL–CIO for spurious get-out-the-vote efforts and the AFL–CIO would pay the same amount to Citizen Action (a liberal grassroots lobbying and organizing group). Citizen Action would then pay $100,000 to The November Group, which would use the cash to finance Carey's direct marketing effort. The alleged scheme was revealed on August 22, 1997, by a federal government official overseeing the Teamsters' election. The federal government overturned Carey's successful reelection, and ordered a new election. On November 17, 1997, a federal official disqualified Carey from seeking elective office in the union. Carey was indicted on federal perjury charges in January 2001, pleaded not guilty, and was found not guilty on all charges on October 12, 2001. Trumka invoked his Fifth Amendment right against self-incrimination during the government's grand jury investigation and a congressional panel, and was never charged with any crimes.

Although the AFL–CIO had a policy (enacted in the wake of several Teamsters' scandals in the late 1950s) appearing to require anyone who asserted their Fifth Amendment rights to be removed from office, AFL–CIO President John Sweeney wrote in a letter sent to AFL–CIO member unions in November 1997 that the AFL–CIO policy regarding assertion of Fifth Amendment rights had "never been applied by the federation". The letter went on to say that "The policy calls for removal only when the union determines that the Fifth Amendment is being invoked to conceal discovery of corruption. The AFL–CIO, as you know, has for some time been conducting its own internal inquiry and has no basis to conclude that there was any unlawful conduct by Secretary-Treasurer Trumka. [...] It is clear that the policy does not apply." During testimony before a congressional subcommittee on April 30, 1998, Sweeney said that a December 1957 resolution adopted by the AFL–CIO amended the policy so that it would not be automatically invoked but rather applied only if the invocation of Fifth Amendment rights were used "as a shield to avoid discovery of corruption". The labor federation appeared satisfied that Trumka should not step down. After Trumka spoke to an executive session of the AFL–CIO Executive Board in January 1998, board members said their concerns about Trumka's involvement in the scandal had been alleviated. On April 30, 1998, Sweeney said no evidence had yet come to light indicating any wrongdoing by Trumka.

On July 1, 2008, Trumka delivered a speech denouncing racism in the 2008 presidential election. An ad of July 1, 2009, a video with an excerpt of the speech, attracted more than 535,000 hits on YouTube. Trumka's video was called "surely the first YouTube moment in the history" of the labor movement by ProPublica journalist Alec MacGillis.

=== AFL–CIO president ===
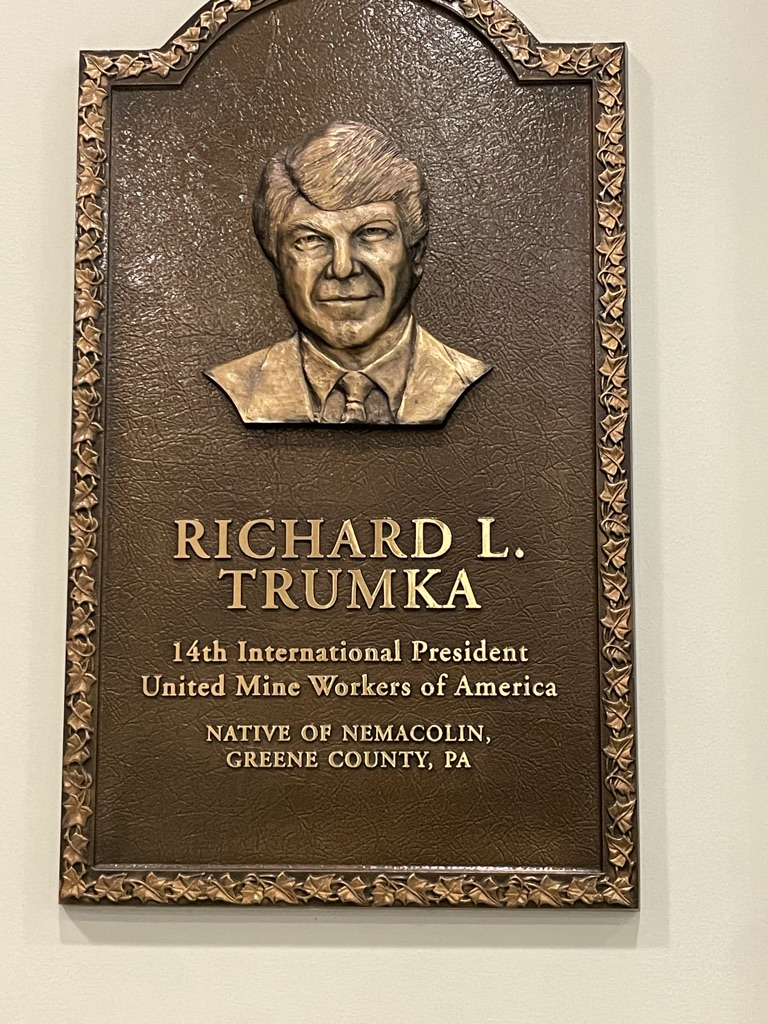
Plaque of Richard L. Trumka

Trumka was elected president of the AFL–CIO after the retirement of John Sweeney in 2009 and president of the Trade Union Advisory Committee to the OECD in May 2010. Trumka was named one of Esquire magazine's Americans of the Year in 2011.

In March 2013, Trumka confirmed that organized labor would make an effort to work more closely with groups trying to aid immigrant workers, as the national debate on minimum wage and fair employment in the restaurant industry heated up.

On August 15, 2017, a few days after the Unite the Right rally and then U.S. President Donald Trump's broadly criticized statements, Trumka quit the president's "manufacturing council" and published a statement, which included the following:

We cannot sit in a council for a President who tolerates bigotry and domestic terrorism. [...] President Trump's remarks today repudiate his forced remarks yesterday about the KKK and neo-Nazis, [...] We must resign on behalf of America's working people, who reject all notions of legitimacy of these bigoted groups.

On February 4, 2018, Trumka was announced to be the first recipient of the World Peace Prize for Labor Leadership because he has dedicated his life to the cause of labor and labor rights, seeking equality, and defending the rights of working men and women.

On July 1, 2022, the White House announced that Trumka would be posthumously awarded the Presidential Medal of Freedom.

== Personal life and death ==
Trumka married Barbara (née Vidovich) in 1982. They had one son, Richard Trumka Jr., whom President Joe Biden appointed in 2021 to be a commissioner of the Consumer Product Safety Commission. Trumka was a Roman Catholic.

Trumka died from a heart attack on August 5, 2021, at age 72.

Trade union offices
Preceded by Sam Church	President of the United Mine Workers of America; 1982–1995	Succeeded by Cecil Roberts
Preceded by Barbara Easterling	Secretary-Treasurer of the AFL-CIO; 1995–2009	Succeeded by Liz Shuler
Preceded by John Sweeney	President of the AFL–CIO; 2009–2021	Succeeded by Liz Shuler
