= Paul Bardacke =

American politician

26th Attorney General of New Mexico
- In office 1983–1986
- Preceded by: Jeff Bingaman
- Succeeded by: Hal Stratton

Personal details
- Born: Paul Gregory Bardacke; December 16, 1944 (age 81)
- Party: Democratic
- Education: University of California, Santa Barbara (BA); University of California, Berkeley (JD)

Paul Gregory Bardacke (born December 16, 1944) is an American attorney and politician who served as the 26th Attorney General of New Mexico from 1983 to 1986.

== Career ==
Bardacke earned a Bachelor of Arts degree from the University of California, Santa Barbara, in 1966 and a Juris Doctor from the University of California, Berkeley, in 1969.

== Career ==
Bardacke was a recipient of the Reginald Heber Smith Fellowship (1969–1970). He was also an instructor in evidence and trial practice at the University of New Mexico School of Law from 1973 to 1982, an adjunct faculty member of the National Institute of Trial Advocacy (since 1978), Special U.S. Attorney for the District of New Mexico (1984–1985), and Special Counsel to State of New Mexico on Windfall Profits Tax Litigation (1981–1985).

Since leaving office as attorney general, Bardacke has maintained a private legal practice in Santa Fe, New Mexico, where he specializes in mediation and arbitration. He is a founding member of the bipartisan think-tank, Think New Mexico.

He served as chairman of Governor Bill Richardson's successful gubernatorial campaigns in 2002.

In 2005, he was a member of a small U.S. delegation to North Korea to negotiate civil rights issues.

In 2010, he was appointed by then-Interior Secretary Ken Salazar to the National Park Service Advisory Board for a three-year term.

The Paul Bardacke Complex, a building on the grounds of the New Mexico State Capitol in Santa Fe, is named after him.

Political offices
Preceded by Jeff Bingaman	Attorney General of New Mexico; 1983-1986	Succeeded by Hal Stratton
