= Ann Marie Buerkle =

American nurse, attorney, and politician (born 1951)

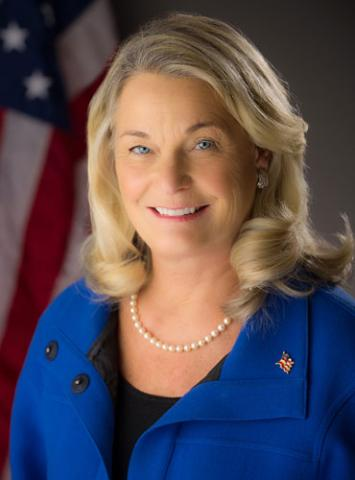
- Official portrait, 2013

Chair of the Consumer Product Safety Commission
- Acting
- In office February 9, 2017 – September 30, 2019
- President: Donald Trump
- Preceded by: Elliot F. Kaye
- Succeeded by: Robert S. Adler (acting)

Commissioner of the Consumer Product Safety Commission
- In office July 23, 2013 – October 27, 2019
- President: Barack Obama; Donald Trump
- Preceded by: Anne Northup
- Succeeded by: Mary Boyle

Member of the U.S. House of Representatives from New York's 25th district
- In office January 3, 2011 – January 3, 2013
- Preceded by: Dan Maffei
- Succeeded by: Dan Maffei (redistricted)

Personal details
- Born: Ann Marie Colella; May 8, 1951 (age 75) Auburn, New York, U.S.
- Party: Republican
- Spouse: August Buerkle (m. 1972–1997)
- Children: 6
- Education: Le Moyne College (BS); Syracuse University (JD)

Ann Marie Buerkle (/ˈbɜːrkəl/ BUR-kəl; née Colella; born May 8, 1951) is an American nurse, attorney, and politician. She served as a commissioner of the U.S. Consumer Product Safety Commission (CPSC) beginning in July 2013 and was the agency's acting chairman from February 2017 to September 2019. During her tenure, the number of companies fined declined sharply, and she was criticized by consumer advocates. Buerkle’s public service career stalled after accusations of mismanagement and incompetence. Buerkle was an Assistant New York State Attorney General from 1997 through 2010. She served as the U.S. representative for the New York's 25th congressional district, elected in 2010 in an upset of a Democratic incumbent. In 2012 a rematch of her 2010 contest, Buerkle was defeated by former Congressman Dan Maffei. She is a member of the Republican Party.

== Early life and career ==
Buerkle was born Ann Marie Colella in 1951 in Auburn, New York, the daughter of Sadie M. (née Fiduccia) and Alfred D. "Al" Colella. All of her grandparents were born in Italy. After graduating as a registered nurse from St. Joseph's Hospital School of Nursing in Syracuse, New York, she worked at Columbia-Presbyterian Hospital in New York City and at St. Joseph's. She was a substitute school nurse for many years before obtaining her J.D. degree from Syracuse University School of Law. She was married to August Buerkle from 1972 to 1997.

She served as an Assistant New York State Attorney General from 1997 to 2010. She also served one term on the Syracuse Common Council. Buerkle is divorced and has six children.

== U.S. House of Representatives ==
=== Elections ===
2010

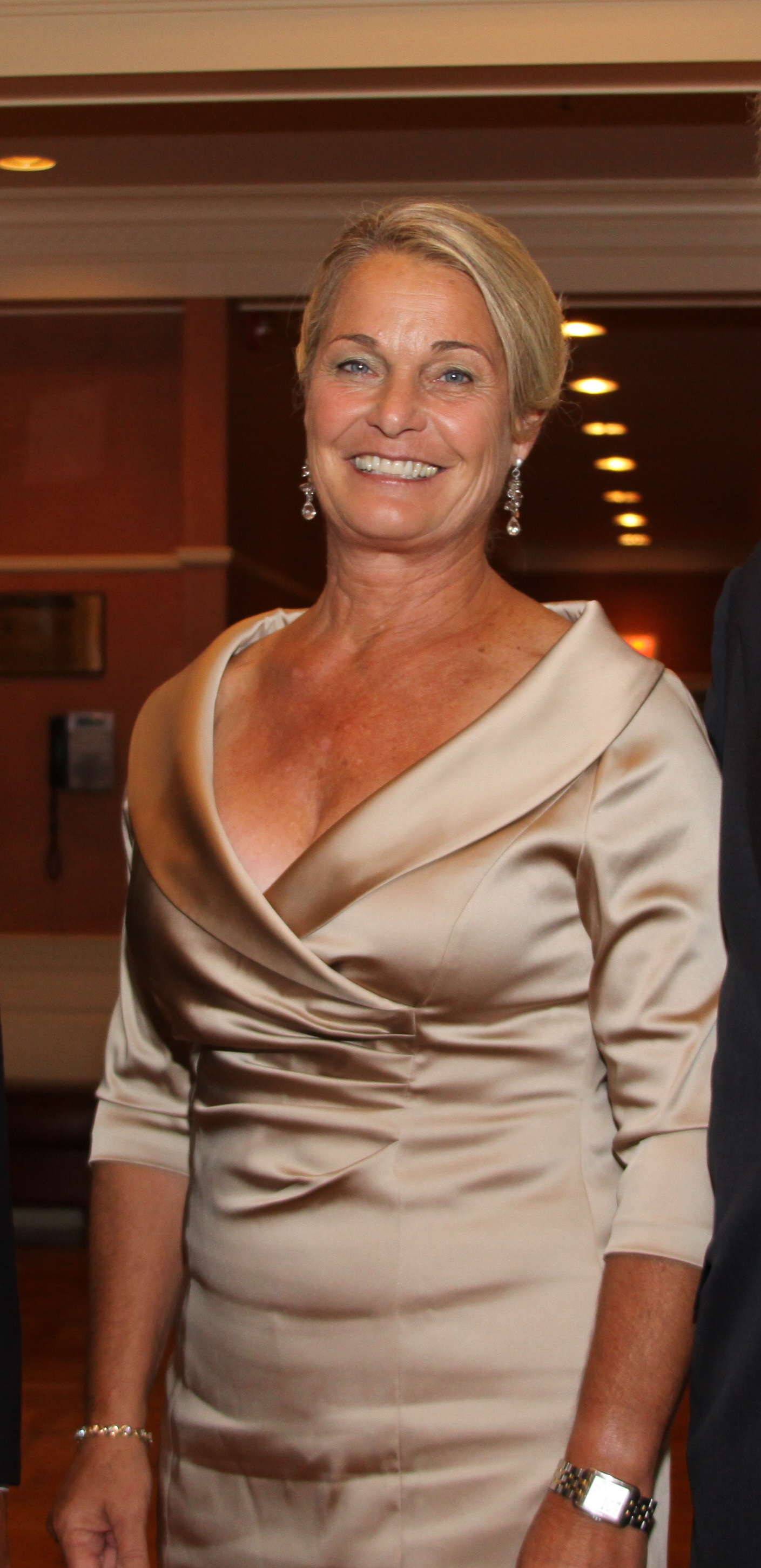
Ann Marie Buerkle, 2010

Buerkle defeated turkey farm owner Mark Bitz and activist Paul Bertan to win the Republican nomination.

Buerkle defeated incumbent Dan Maffei in the 2010 midterm election, an outcome determined after weeks of absentee ballot counting and precinct recanvassing; Buerkle emerged victorious by a narrow 567-vote margin of over 200,000 ballots cast. Maffei conceded the race on November 23, 2010, when it became clear that challenged votes would not change the outcome of the race.

Maffei had been favored to retain the seat. In addition to rating the district as "Leans Democratic", RealClearPolitics and other pundits thought it was an unlikely congressional district to switch parties. Going into the election, other pundits from CQ Politics, The Cook Report, and the Rothenberg Report ranked it as "Lean Democrat" to "Democrat Favored".

Buerkle was endorsed by former Alaska Governor and 2008 vice-presidential candidate Sarah Palin (who labeled Buerkle a "Mama Grizzly"), as well as by former Massachusetts Governor Mitt Romney. Buerkle, who received substantial Tea Party support in 2010, was described as having "[ridden] the tea party wave to Washington, winning an upstate New York district that leans Democratic on promises of reducing the size of government and repealing the health care overhaul."

2012

In redistricting, Buerkle's district was renumbered as the 24th district and made more Democratic. Buerkle was endorsed by the NRA Political Victory Fund. She faced a rematch against Maffei and lost, 48.7 percent to 43.3 percent.

=== Tenure ===
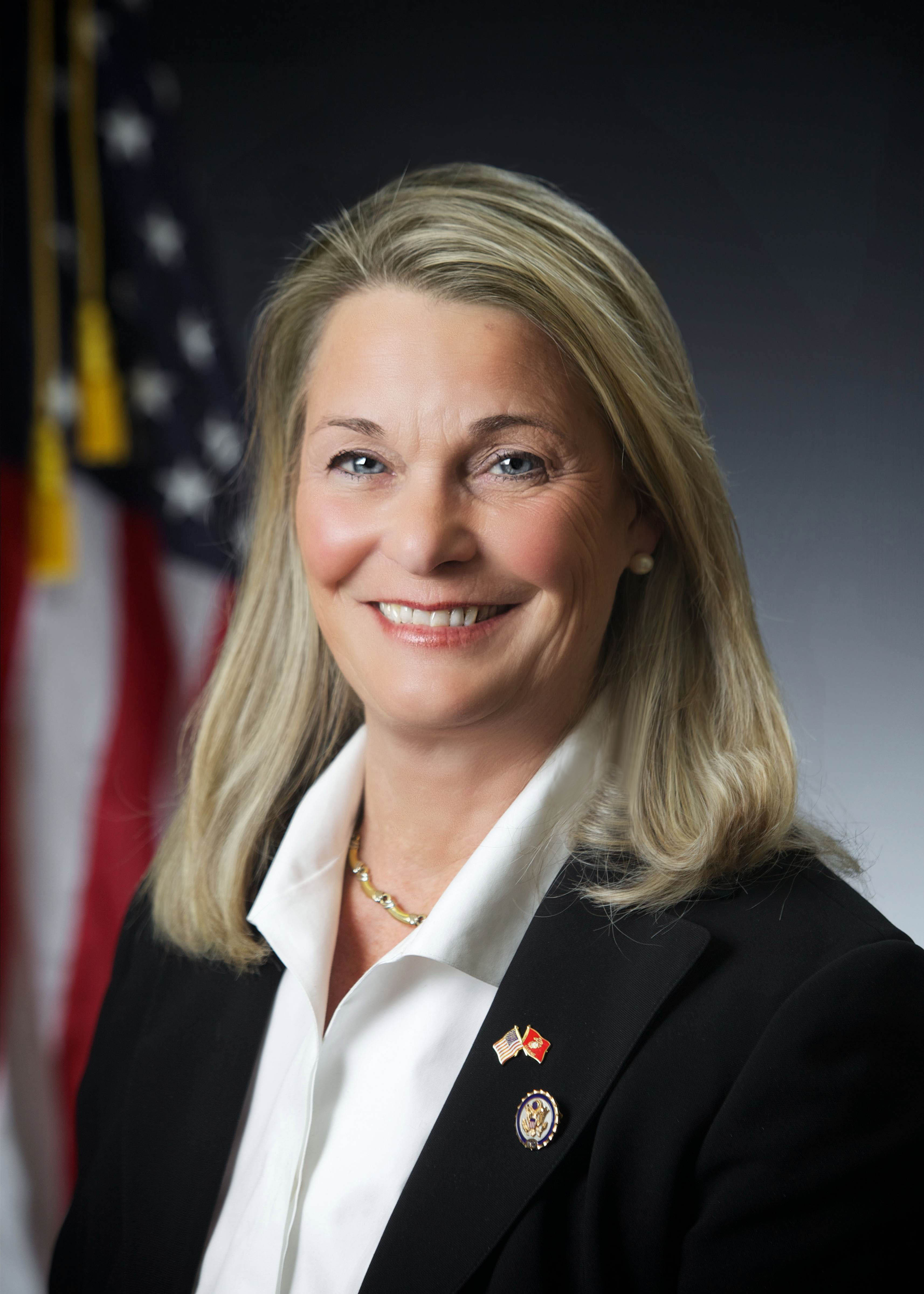
Buerkle's official congressional portrait

In 2011, Buerkle voted to repeal the Patient Protection and Affordable Care Act of 2010. In 2011 Buerkle voted to renew the Patriot Act. On September 16, 2011, President Barack Obama named Buerkle to serve as a U.S. representative to the 66th Session of the United Nations General Assembly, which started in late 2011. Buerkle was previously selected by John Boehner to represent the Republicans.

In May 2012, Buerkle stated that she opposed the procurement practices of the Transportation Security Administration (TSA) with regard to security screening equipment. Speaking of a report by the House Transportation & Infrastructure Committee (T&I) and Committee on Oversight and Government Reform (OGR), of which Buerkle was a member, she wrote, "This report is evidence that TSA is a flawed agency and is wasting the taxpayers' money. TSA has repeatedly failed to effectively procure and deploy screening equipment that actually detects threats. Making matters worse is that as complaints about the invasiveness of TSA searches continue to increase, significant amounts of state-of-the-art technology is sitting, unused in warehouses in Texas."

During the 112th Congress (2011–2013), Buerkle sponsored 17 bills and resolutions, none of which became law or attracted major attention or significant floor debate. The measures she introduced were primarily ceremonial or narrowly focused, including proposals to amend the charter of The American Legion and to rename federal buildings.

=== Committee assignments ===
- Committee on Foreign Affairs
  - Subcommittee on Africa, Global Health, and Human Rights
  - Subcommittee on the Middle East and South Asia
  - Subcommittee on Terrorism, Nonproliferation, and Trade (Vice Chair)
- Committee on Oversight and Government Reform
  - Subcommittee on Regulatory Affairs, Stimulus Oversight and Government Spending (Vice Chair)
  - Subcommittee on TARP, Financial Services and Bailouts of Public and Private Programs
- Committee on Veterans Affairs
  - Subcommittee on Health (Chair)
  - Subcommittee on Disability Assistance and Memorial Affairs

== U.S. Consumer Product Safety Commission ==
In May 2013, Buerkle was nominated by President Barack Obama to serve on the U.S. Consumer Product Safety Commission (CPSC). She was confirmed by the United States Senate and assumed the role of CPSC commissioner on July 23, 2013. Buerkle became acting chairman of the agency on February 9, 2017. In July 2017, she was nominated by President Donald Trump to become CPSC chairman. During her term as chair, enforcement actions declined and the number of product recalls was the lowest in a decade. On June 18, 2019, Buerkle withdrew her nominations to become the full-time chairman and to an additional four-year term, following accusations of incompetence and mismanagement surrounding a 2019 data breach, candor to Congress concerns, and controversy over a settlement that avoided the recall of unsafe strollers. Citing several operational issues, House Energy and Commerce Committee Chair Cathy McMorris Rodgers stated at a July 2024 hearing that “the Commission fell into disrepair" under Buerkle’s leadership.

== Electoral history ==
US House election, 2010: New York District 25
Party	Candidate	Votes	%	±%
Republican	Ann Marie Buerkle	104,374	50.2	+8.0
Democratic	Dan Maffei (incumbent)	103,807	49.8	−4.7
Majority		567	0.3	−10.4
Turnout		208,181	100	+23.4

US House election, 2012: New York District 24
Party	Candidate	Votes	%	±%
Democratic	Dan Maffei	143,044	48.8	−1.0
Republican	Ann Marie Buerkle (incumbent)	127,054	43.4	−6.8
Green	Ursula Rozum	22,670	7.7	+7.7
Majority		15,990	5.5	+5.2
Turnout		292,988	100	+40.7

== See also ==
- Women in the United States House of Representatives

U.S. House of Representatives
Preceded by Dan Maffei	Member of the U.S. House of Representatives from New York's 25th congressional district 2011–2013	Succeeded by Louise Slaughter
U.S. order of precedence (ceremonial)
Preceded by Michael McMahon as Former U.S. Representative	Order of precedence of the United States as Former U.S. Representative	Succeeded by Nan Hayworth as Former U.S. Representative
