= United States House Oversight Subcommittee on TARP, Financial Services and Bailouts of Public and Private Programs =

The Subcommittee on TARP, Financial Services and Bailouts of Public and Private Programs is a subcommittee within the U.S. House of Representatives's Oversight and Government Reform Committee. It was established in 112th Congress, during a committee reorganization spearheaded by the full committee's chairman, Darrell Issa, which restructured the various subcommittees' jurisdictions and increased the total number of subcommittees from five to seven.

== Jurisdiction ==
The subcommittee was created primarily to provide oversight of the Troubled Asset Relief Program, or TARP, established in 2008.

== Members, 112th Congress ==
Majority	Minority
Patrick McHenry, North Carolina, Chairman; Frank Guinta, New Hampshire, Vice Chair; Ann Marie Buerkle, New York; Justin Amash, Michigan; Pat Meehan, Pennsylvania; Joe Walsh, Illinois; Trey Gowdy, South Carolina; Dennis A. Ross, Florida	Mike Quigley, Illinois, Ranking Member; Carolyn Maloney, New York; Peter Welch, Vermont; John Yarmuth, Kentucky; Jackie Speier, California; Jim Cooper, Tennessee
Ex officio
Darrell Issa, California	Elijah Cummings, Maryland
