= Dana Baiocco =

American government official

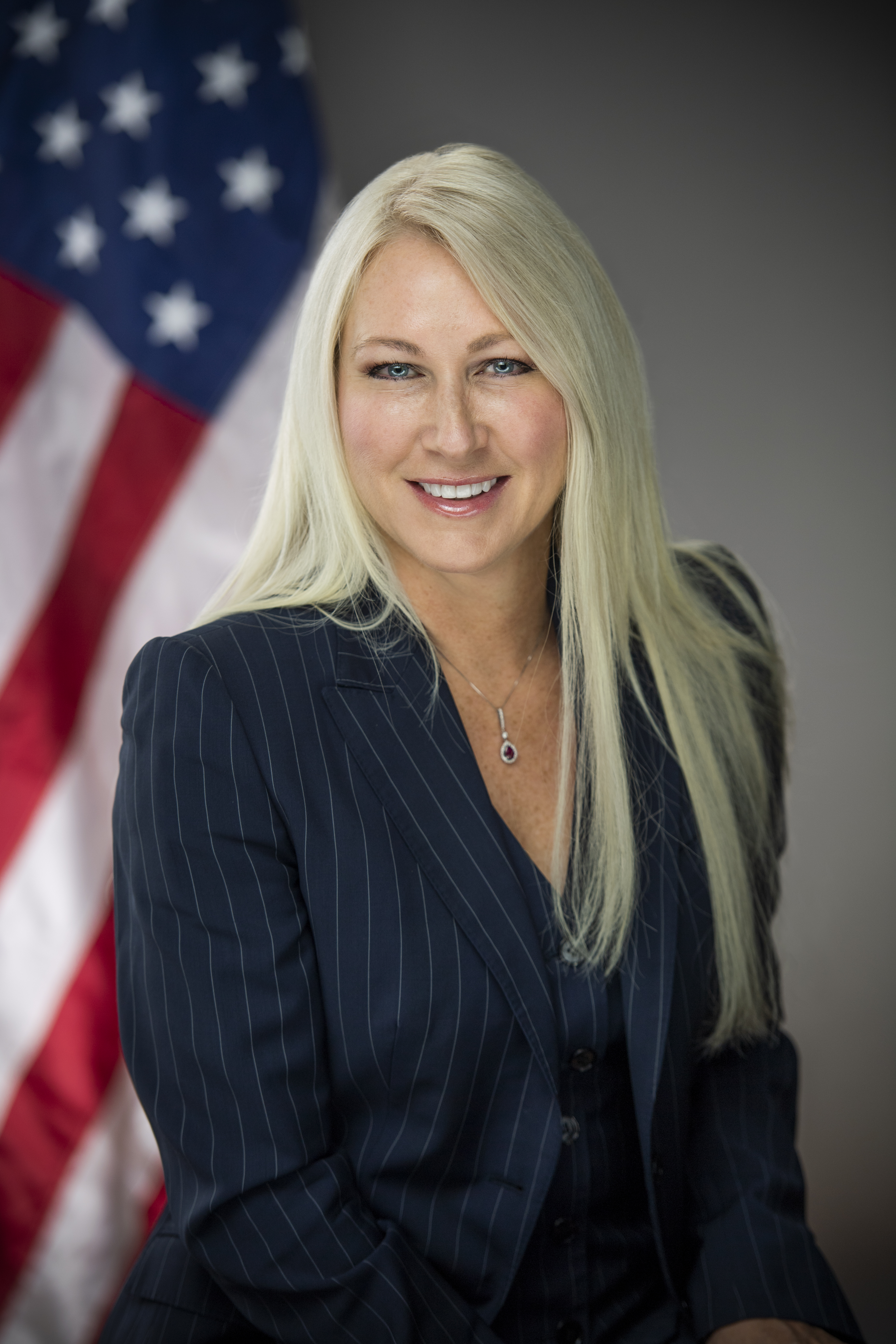

Commissioner of the U.S. Consumer Product Safety Commission
- In office June 1, 2018 – October 5, 2022
- President: Donald Trump; Joe Biden
- Preceded by: Marietta S. Robinson
- Succeeded by: Douglas Dziak

Personal details
- Party: Republican
- Education: Ohio University; Duquesne University School of Law

Dana Baiocco is a former member of the U.S. Consumer Product Safety Commission. President Donald Trump originally nominated her in 2017, and renominated her in the subsequent congressional session. The United States Senate confirmed her on May 22, 2018, and she was sworn in on June 1, 2018. She resigned on October 5, 2022.

== Early life and education ==
Baiocco earned an undergraduate degree in Journalism from Ohio University and attended law school at Duquesne University School of Law.

== Career ==
=== Law ===
Before joining the U.S. Consumer Product Safety Commission, Baiocco was a federal law clerk for The Honorable Gustave Diamond, U.S. District Court Judge for the Western District of Pennsylvania. She joined the law firm Jones Day in Pittsburgh, PA, in 1998 and worked there until 2018.

=== U.S. Consumer Product Safety Commission ===
Baiocco was nominated as a commissioner for the U.S. Consumer Product Safety Commission by President Donald Trump and was confirmed in May 2018.

Political offices
Preceded by Marietta S. Robinson	Commissioner of the United States Consumer Product Safety Commission; 2018–2022; Served alongside: Anne Marie Buerkle, Robert S. Adler, Elliot F. Kaye, Peter A. Feldman	Succeeded by Douglas Dziak
