= Hal Stratton =

American lawyer and former New Mexico politician (born 1950)

Hal Stratton, Jr.
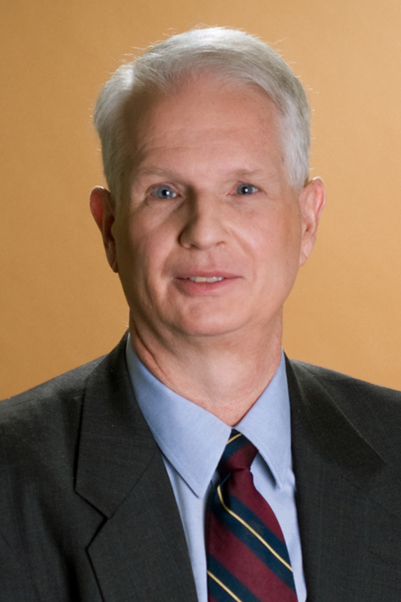

8th Chairman of the Consumer Product Safety Commission
- In office July 25, 2002 – July 15, 2006
- President: George W. Bush
- Preceded by: Thomas H. Moore (acting)
- Succeeded by: Nancy Nord (acting)

27th Attorney General of New Mexico
- In office January 1, 1987 – January 1, 1991
- Governor: Garrey Carruthers
- Preceded by: Paul Bardacke
- Succeeded by: Tom Udall

Member of the New Mexico House of Representatives from the 29th District
- In office 1978–1986

Personal details
- Born: December 6, 1950 (age 75) Muskogee, Oklahoma
- Party: Republican
- Education: University of Oklahoma (B.A., J.D.)
- Occupation: attorney, politician

Harold Duane "Hal" Stratton, Jr. (born December 6, 1950) is an American lawyer with the Albuquerque office of the Denver based western regional law firm, Brownstein Hyatt Farber Schreck, LLP. In addition to a career in the private practice of law, he has served in the New Mexico House of Representatives (1979–86), as the Attorney General of New Mexico (1987–1990) and as the chairman of the U.S. Consumer Product Safety Commission (2002–2006). Stratton belongs to the Republican Party. As of 2025, he is the last member of his party to serve as the Attorney General of New Mexico, and the only member to have served in the past 95 years.

== Early years and education ==
Stratton was born in Muskogee, Oklahoma on December 6, 1950, and is an enrolled member of the Cherokee Nation. At age 5, his family moved to Oklahoma City where he grew up and graduated from John Marshall High School. He attended the University of Oklahoma on a geology scholarship and earned a bachelor's degree with a major in geology in 1973. He also graduated from the University of Oklahoma Army R.O.T.C. program as a distinguished military graduate. He later attended law school at the University of Oklahoma, where he earned a Juris Doctor degree in law in 1976, and was a member of the American Indian Law Review. After law school, Stratton served on active duty in the U.S. Army before moving to Albuquerque, New Mexico to begin the private practice of law with the law firm, Coors, Singer and Broullire, in 1977.

== Public service ==
=== N.M House of Representatives ===
In 1978, at the age of 27, Stratton ran for a seat in the New Mexico House of Representatives in Albuquerque's District 29 as a Republican and defeated the House Majority Whip by a margin of 56%–44%. He was reelected to the New Mexico House three times thereafter and served a total of four terms. During his tenure in the New Mexico House, Stratton served on the Judiciary, Energy and Natural Resources, Rules and Transportation Committees. He served as the vice chairman of the Energy and Natural Resources Committee, and in 1985–86 as chairman of the Judiciary Committee. While in the legislature, Stratton sponsored or co-sponsored numerous criminal justice measures and other legislation designed to reduce taxes and limit the size and scope of state government. While in the state legislature, Stratton served on a number of other committees including the National Conference of Commissioners on Uniform State Laws, the New Mexico Judicial Counsel and the Radioactive Waste Consultation Committee. Stratton was named the American Legislative Exchange Council's Legislator of the Year in 1981.

=== New Mexico Attorney General ===
In 1986, Stratton was elected to the office of New Mexico Attorney General. He is the only Republican to be elected to that office in New Mexico since 1928. Stratton was limited to one term as New Mexico Attorney General by the New Mexico Constitution and served from 1987 through 1990. During his term as attorney general, Stratton brought actions to determine the constitutionality of legislative retirement, public sector collective bargaining, and the legality of the actions of the Public Employees Retirement Board as well as others. While attorney general, Stratton successfully argued the case of Cotton Petroleum v. State of New Mexico before the U.S. Supreme Court. Also, while serving as attorney general, Stratton brought the largest consumer action in the history of the New Mexico Attorney General's office on behalf of New Mexico consumers against Frontier Ford, gaining a $1.2 million settlement on behalf of the state and consumers.

=== U.S. Consumer Product Safety Commission ===
Stratton was nominated by President Bush to be chairman of the U.S. Consumer Product Safety Commission (CPSC) in March 2002, confirmed for the position by the U.S. Senate on July 25, 2002, and sworn in as chairman on August 2, 2002. He served in that position until resigning effective July 15, 2006. During his term at the CPSC Stratton oversaw the revamping of the CPSC website, [www.cpsc.gov], the establishment of [www.recalls.gov], the promulgation of the first major regulation by the CPSC involving mattress flammability, the establishment of a retailer reporting model for retailers reporting dangerous products, and the establishment of the CPSC Office of International Programs. Stratton implemented the first memorandum of understanding with AQSIQ in China, where he held the first Sino-US Consumer Product Safety Summit in 2005. The CPSC Office of International programs went on to implement memorandum of understandings with the largest U.S. trading partners including India, Canada, Mexico, the European Union, Taiwan, Korea, Israel as well as others.

During the course of his tenure at the CPSC the agency implemented the largest recall in U.S. history involving children's vending machine jewelry and imposed the largest penalty on an industry stakeholder for failure to report the distribution of dangerous products. During that same time, the CPSC worked on a number of other product issues involving ATVs, upholstered furniture, gasoline generators, and various toys and juvenile products including baby bath seats

=== Rio Grande Foundation ===
In 2000, Stratton, along with economist and former economics professor, Harry Messenheimer, founded the Rio Grande Foundation (RGF). The RGF was founded as an academic free market think tank to provide economic research for decision makers in New Mexico. The RGF website states:

The Rio Grande Foundation of New Mexico is an independent, non-partisan, tax-exempt research and educational organization dedicated to the study of public policy. The Foundation promotes prosperity for New Mexico based on principles of limited government, economic freedom and individual responsibility. The Rio Grande Foundation neither seeks nor accepts government funding. The Foundation relies solely on generosity of individuals and institutions in the private sector to fund its activities.

After being nominated as chairman of the CPSC, Stratton resigned as chairman and president of the RGF and severed all ties with the organization. After Stratton's departure in 2002, Messenheimer continued operation of the organization which is now run by the president, Paul Gessing.

== Legal career ==
During his last semester in law school, Stratton worked for the Oklahoma City Municipal Counselor's Office where he prosecuted DUI cases on behalf of the city and tried two jury trials. After graduating from law school, Stratton moved to Albuquerque, New Mexico in 1977 and joined the law firm, Coors, Singer and Broullire as an associate. In 1984, Stratton and former state senator, Mickey Barnett, formed the law firm of Stratton & Barnett, which existed until 1987 when Stratton assumed the position of New Mexico Attorney General. After leaving the New Mexico Attorney General's office in 1991, Stratton formed a law firm of Stratton & Cavin with partner Sealy Cavin, which existed until 2002 prior to Stratton's departure to become chairman of the CPSC.

After leaving the CPSC in 2006, Stratton joined the Washington, D.C., office of the law firm, Dykema Gossett, where he practiced until April 2008. He then returned to Albuquerque, New Mexico, to join the Albuquerque office of Brownstein Hyatt Farber Schreck, where he now practices.

Stratton is a member of the New Mexico, Colorado, Oklahoma, Texas and District of Columbia bars. He is also admitted before the U.S. Supreme Court as well as a number of federal appellate and district courts.

Stratton also served as an adjunct professor of law at the George Mason University School of Law, where he taught a law course he created, State Attorneys General: History, Powers and Responsibilities.

Hal now works as a sole practitioner and consultant at his own firm of Hal Stratton Law and Consulting, LLC located in Albuquerque, New Mexico.

== Public appearances ==
During the course of his career Stratton has made scores of television appearances on news programs on ABC, NBC, CBS, CNN, FOX, MSNBC and PBS and their local affiliates. He has given over one hundred keynote speeches and seminars in English and Spanish in over 11 countries and 35 states, and written articles and publications on legal, legislative, and regulatory issues.

== Sources ==
- Official CPSC Biography
- Thomson Hine
- Warning: Gas Generators Can Kill – article in St. Petersburg Times, Nov. 15, 2005
- Chairman of Safety Commission Heads to Law Firm – Washington Post, July 17, 2006
- Dykema Gossett Biography
- Hackocracy: Home Boy Hal Makes the List – Duke City Fix, 10/13/15

Political offices
Preceded by Thomas H. Moore (acting)	Chairman of the Consumer Product Safety Commission; 2002–2006	Succeeded by Nancy Nord (acting)
Preceded by Ann Brown	Commissioner of the Consumer Product Safety Commission; 2002–2006	Succeeded by Inez Tenenbaum
Legal offices
Preceded by Paul Bardacke	Attorney General of New Mexico; 1987–1991	Succeeded by Tom Udall
