= Rio Grande Foundation =

American think tank

Coordinates: 35.1364°N 106.7022°W

- Formation: 2000
- Founders: Hal Stratton and Harry Messenheimer
- Type: Nonprofit think tank
- Location(s): 400 Gold Ave SW, Suite 909 Albuquerque, NM 87102
- President: Paul Gessing
- Budget: Revenue: $316,000; Expenses: $409,000 (FYE December 2024)
- Website: www.riograndefoundation.org

The Rio Grande Foundation is a free market economic policy think tank and taxpayer watchdog group based in Albuquerque, New Mexico. It is affiliated with the U.S. nationwide State Policy Network. It was founded in 2000 by Hal Stratton, a former state representative and Attorney General of New Mexico, and Harry Messenheimer, an economist then at George Mason University. Paul Gessing became president in 2006. The group is a 501(c)(3) tax-exempt organization.

== Activities ==
The Wall Street Journal ran an article on January 19, 2009, outlining several allegations of state corruption in New Mexico and pointing to the state's lack of comprehensive ethics laws as a possible cause. On January 29, The Wall Street Journal published a letter by Rio Grande Foundation president Paul Gessing, suggesting that government transparency would improve New Mexico's political situation. Gessing pointed out that the legislature had failed to follow through with any of the proposed ethics reforms of recent years. He suggested that the legislature begin Webcasting its sessions to give citizens the opportunity to monitor their government's actions.

In 2009, the Rio Grande Foundation president Paul Gessing criticized the creation of a Department of Motor Vehicles and Hispanic Affairs Department in New Mexico, an idea proposed in two bills introduced in the New Mexico legislature. In an interview with the Santa Fe New Mexican, Gessing said, "the last thing we need is to hire more highly-paid cabinet-level state bureaucrats."

The Rio Grande Foundation "made a big splash" in its fight against a streetcar project in Albuquerque; several members of the group spoke in opposition to the streetcar at the City Council, and the Foundation supported an anti-streecar group called Stop Wasting Albuquerque Taxes (SWAT).

In 2024, Rio Grande Foundation President Paul Gessing authored an opinion editorial that defended Representative Larry R. Scott's conservative record against attacks from his Republican primary opponent, Steven McCutcheon II. Gessing wrote a follow-up letter to the editor "at the 'behest' of McCutcheon's campaign consultant reiterating the foundation doesn't endorse candidates and also that McCutcheon ranked as the fourth-most conservative member of the Senate."

In 2025, the Rio Grande Foundation opposed a paid family and medical leave bill by distributing mock-up mailers targeting Reps. Doreen Gallegos and Art De La Cruz. The mailers, delivered by RGF Action, the foundation's 501(c)(4) arm, praised or criticized the lawmakers based on their stance. De La Cruz called it intimidation since his mailer was left at his home, while Gessing defended it as standard political strategy. Said Gessing, "I think it's safe to say that we want to make sure that people who vote for this tax increase, this massive expansion of government burden on the taxpayers, at least as originally formulated in the current bill, [know] we're going to pull out all the stops and fight this expansion of government."

Also in 2025, Mayor Tim Keller's reelection campaign filed an ethics complaint with the Albuquerque city clerk alleging that Gessing violated municipal election rules by refusing to disclose the individuals responsible for distributing "I Love Tim Keller" sweatshirts to homeless residents in the International District. The complaint argued that the distribution constituted a political expenditure exceeding the city's $250 reporting threshold. Gessing maintained that he acted solely as a media commentator protected by the First Amendment and denied involvement.
