= Peter Feldman (attorney) =

American lawyer (born 1982)

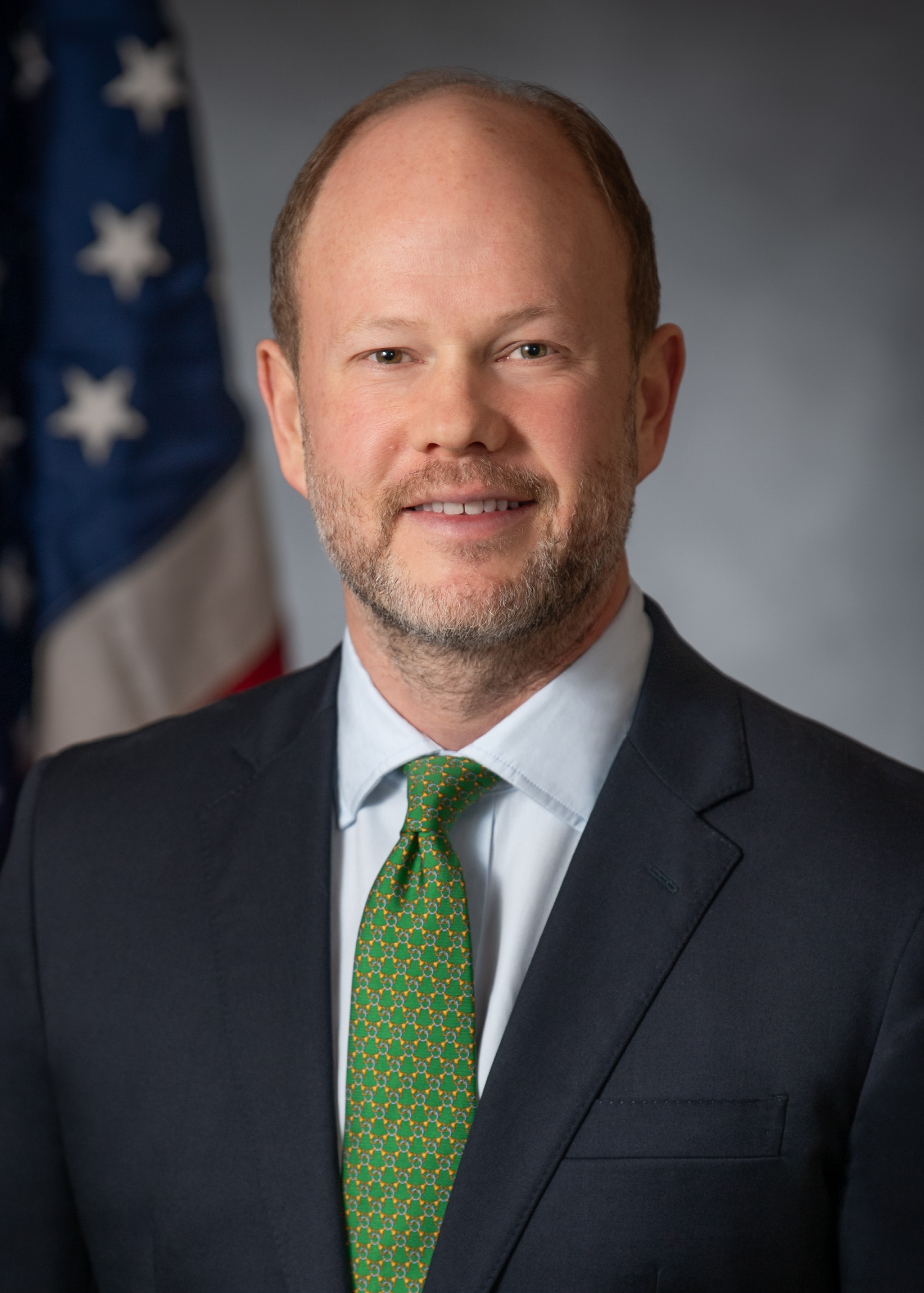
- Official portrait, 2025

Chair of the Consumer Product Safety Commission
- Acting
- Assumed office January 21, 2025
- President: Donald Trump
- Preceded by: Alexander Hoehn-Saric

Commissioner of the Consumer Product Safety Commission
- Incumbent
- Assumed office October 5, 2018
- President: Donald Trump; Joe Biden; Donald Trump
- Preceded by: Joseph Mohorovic

Personal details
- Born: May 22, 1982 (age 44) Cleveland, Ohio, U.S.
- Party: Republican
- Education: Colgate University (BA); American University (JD)

Peter A. Feldman (born May 22, 1982) is an American lawyer and currently serves as the acting chairman of the U.S. Consumer Product Safety Commission. Feldman was nominated by President Donald Trump and confirmed by the U.S. Senate in 2018. Previously, he served as a senior counsel to the Commerce Committee in the U.S. Senate. Feldman is a Republican, and worked as a staffer for various Republican senators.

== Early life and education ==
Feldman was born in Cleveland, Ohio, on May 22, 1982. Feldman attended St. Albans School in Washington, D.C. He then attended Colgate University, graduating with a B.A., cum laude, in 2004. Feldman received his juris doctor, cum laude, from American University’s Washington College of Law in 2010.

== Career ==
Feldman served as a senior counsel to the United States Senate Committee on Commerce, Science, and Transportation from 2011 until he joined the CPSC in 2018. In that role, he served as a key advisor on consumer protection, product safety, data security, and privacy issues to Senator John Thune, chairman of the Senate Commerce Committee, and was instrumental in drafting and negotiating bipartisan legislation and conducting oversight and investigations of the CPSC, the Federal Trade Commission, and private sector firms. Among other things, Feldman has advocated for science and risk-based regulations, agency engagement with stakeholders, and regulatory burden reduction.

Feldman led the commerce committee's efforts on numerous bipartisan legislative initiatives, including the Consumer Review Fairness Act, the Better Online Ticket Sales Act, and the Child Nicotine Poisoning Prevention Act.

As the Senate commerce committee's senior sports attorney, Feldman worked to expand and modernize the United States Anti-Doping Agency, conducted investigations into the U.S. Olympic Committee following the USA Gymnastics sex abuse scandal, and served as lead negotiator on the bipartisan Protecting Young Victims from Sexual Abuse and Safe Sport Authorization Act.

As a staffer for former U.S. Senator Mike DeWine, Feldman worked directly on the Virginia Graeme Baker Pool and Spa Safety Act, a bill that aimed to protect children by reducing suction entrapment accidents in pools.

Feldman's appointment to the CPSC began a Republican majority on the commission.

== Acting Chairman of the U.S. Consumer Product Safety Commission (CPSC) ==
On January 22, 2025, Peter A. Feldman was appointed acting chairman of the U.S. Consumer Product Safety Commission (CPSC) following the resignation of Alexander Hoehn-Saric. Feldman had previously served as vice chairman, a role he was elected to on January 13, 2025. During Feldman's tenure as an Acting Chairman of the U.S. Consumer Product Safety Commission (CPSC), the agency achieved several notable enforcement milestones. In May 2025, CPSC announced a record-breaking number of product safety recalls issued within a single week, noting that nearly all involved products manufactured in the People’s Republic of China. The agency also set a recall record for violations of the voluntary safety standard for adult portable bed rails, as part of its campaign focused on protecting older adults from hazardous consumer products. Additionally, Feldman oversaw a first-of-its-kind enforcement sweep targeting imported faucets manufactured in China that were found to leach lead and other contaminants into drinking water.

Political offices
Preceded by Joseph Mohorovic	Commissioner of the United States Consumer Product Safety Commission; 2018–present Served alongside: Anne Marie Buerkle, Robert S. Adler, Elliot F. Kaye, Dana Baiocco	Incumbent
