= Consumer Product Safety Act =

1972 American legislation

- Other short titles: CPSA
- Long title: An Act to protect consumers against unreasonable risk of injury from hazardous products, and for other purposes.
- Enacted by: the 92nd United States Congress
- Effective: on the sixtieth day (December 26, 1972) following the date of its enactment (October 27, 1972)

Citations
- Public law: 92-573
- Statutes at Large: 86 Stat. 1207

Codification
- Titles amended: 15 U.S.C.: Commerce and Trade
- U.S.C. sections created: 15 U.S.C. ch. 47 § 2051 et seq.

Legislative history
- Introduced in the Senate as S. 3419 on March 24, 1972; Passed the Senate on June 21, 1972; Passed the House on September 20, 1972; Signed into law by President Richard Nixon on October 27, 1972

The Consumer Safety Act (CPSA) was enacted on October 27, 1972, by the United States Congress. The act should not be confused with an earlier Senate Joint Resolution 33 of November 20, 1967, which merely established a temporary National Commission on Product Safety (NCPS), and for only 90-days (at a pittance of $100 per day). The fourth section of the law established the United States Consumer Product Safety Commission (CPSC) as a permanent independent agency of the United States federal government and defined its basic authority. The act gives CPSC the power to develop safety standards and pursue recalls for products that present unreasonable or substantial risks of injury or death to consumers. It also allows CPSC to ban a product if there is no feasible alternative to an outright ban. CPSC has jurisdiction over more than 15,000 different consumer products. The CPSA excludes from jurisdiction those products that expressly lie in another federal agency's jurisdiction, for example food, drugs, cosmetics, medical devices, tobacco products, firearms and ammunition, motor vehicles, pesticides, aircraft, and boats. These products may fall under the purview of agencies such as the U.S. Food and Drug Administration, the U.S. Bureau of Alcohol, Tobacco, Firearms and Explosives, the U.S. Department of Agriculture, the U.S. Department of Transportation, the U.S. Environment Protection Agency, and the U.S. Federal Aviation Administration.

The CPSA is codified at 15 U.S.C. §§ 2051–2084. Federal regulations associated with the act are at Title 16 CFR parts 1101 through 1406. These regulations are numerous and include such laws as the Poison Prevention Packaging Act (PPPA), safety standards for such products as bicycle helmets and cigarette lighters, a ban on lead in paint, and a rule concerning size requirements for toys that could be choking hazards for young children.

== Related improvements and amendments ==
On August 14, 2008, the Consumer Product Safety Improvement Act of 2008 became effective. Among other provisions, its Section 219 (15 U.S.C. 2051) protects whistle blowers who take certain actions to raise concerns about consumer product safety. Those who believe they suffered unlawful retaliation for raising such concerns have 180 days to file a written complaint with OSHA seeking statutory remedies.

It requires manufacturers and importers of all children's products to have batches of their products tested by an independent certified laboratory. It affected, among other things, distribution of children's books which may contain small amounts of lead. Public libraries were forced to pull thousands of books from their shelves. Testing books for lead would cost about $300 per book, according to a spokeswoman for the American Library Association, which has opposed the law. In 2011, President Obama signed HR 2715 into law, which exempted ordinary books from testing requirements.

Coffee shops, second-hand goods stores, and others selling children's goods including books manufactured before 1985 may not sell children's goods that violate the lead standards. In order to assure themselves of the safety of those products, they may use a variety of means, the most reliable of which would be lead testing on the products.

The CPSIA law had threatened sales of motorcycles and all-terrain vehicles built for children under 12, as internal parts of the bikes are built with alloys containing a small amount of lead. However, these too were also exempted under the 2011 amendment.
