= Alexander Hoehn-Saric =

American attorney

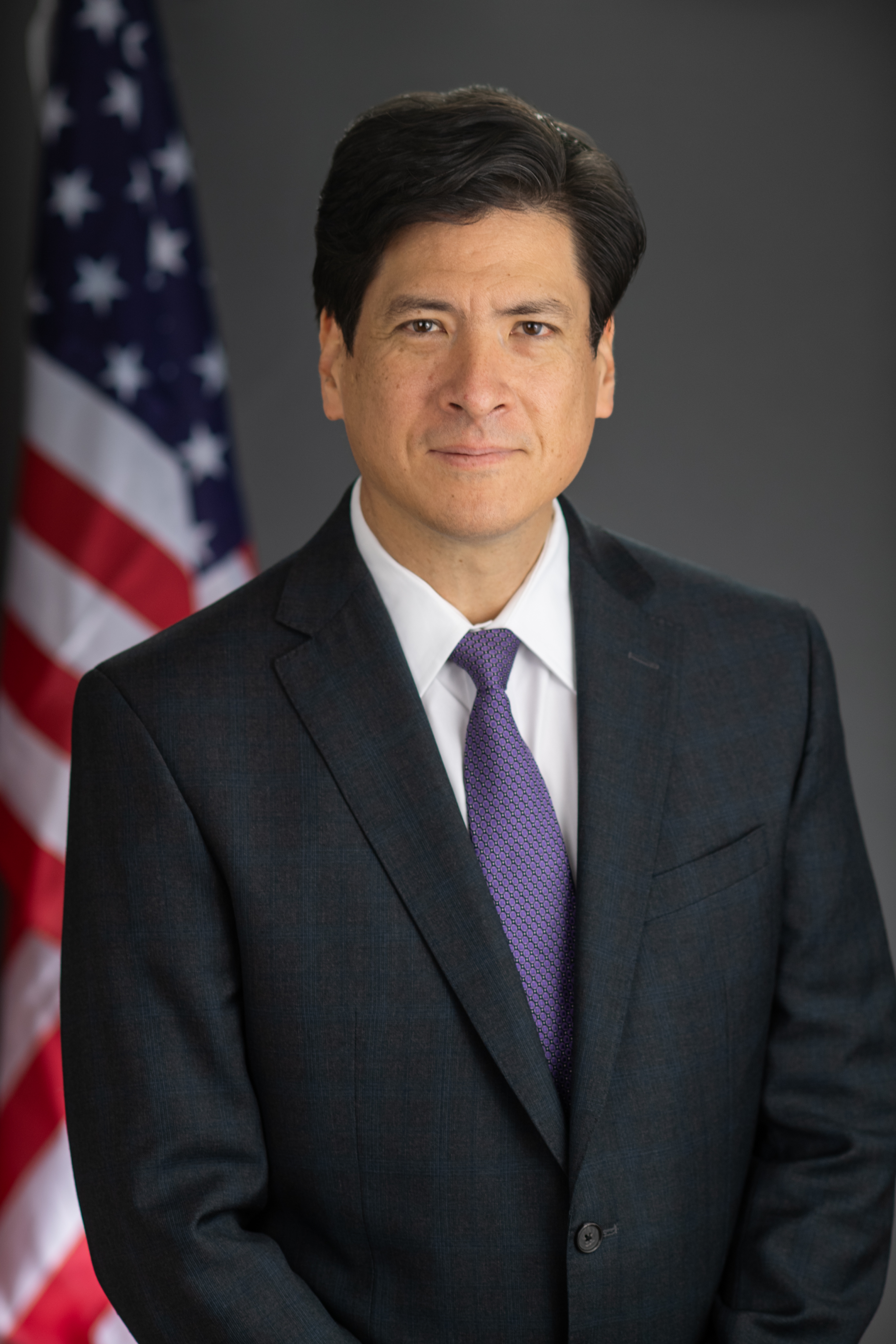

Chair of the Consumer Product Safety Commission
- In office October 12, 2021 – January 21, 2025
- President: Joe Biden; Donald Trump
- Preceded by: Robert S. Adler (acting)
- Succeeded by: Peter Feldman (acting)

Commissioner of the Consumer Product Safety Commission
- In office October 12, 2021 – July 23, 2025; Suspended: May 19, 2025 – June 13, 2025 (Note: Hoehn-Saric was fired by President Donald Trump on May 19, 2025 but was reinstated alongside two other fired commission members by a ruling by US District Court judge Matthew Maddox which used Humphrey’s Executor v. United States (1935) as precendent. This ruling was overturned by a 6-3 emergency order by the US Supreme Court on July 23, 2025.)
- President: Joe Biden; Donald Trump
- Preceded by: Elliot F. Kaye
- Succeeded by: TBD

Personal details
- Born: 1963 (age 62–63) Brooklyn, New York
- Party: Democratic
- Education: University of Chicago (BA); University of California, Los Angeles (JD)

Alexander Hoehn-Saric (born 1963) is an American attorney and government official who served as a commissioner of the Consumer Product Safety Commission from October 2021 to July 2025 and previously served as chair from 2021 to 2025. Hoehn-Saric is a Democrat.

== Early life and education ==
Hoehn-Saric was born to immigrants from China and Austria and grew up in Baltimore, Maryland. He received a bachelor's degree in political science from the University of Chicago and a JD from UCLA Law School.

== Career ==
Hoehn-Saric previously served as Chief Counsel for Communications and Consumer Protection for the House Committee on Energy and Commerce. He worked on legislation and oversight on issues ranging from product safety to communications.

On the Senate side, he served as senior counsel for the U.S. Senate Committee on Commerce, Science and Transportation, handling product safety and consumer protection matters. Hoehn-Saric also served at the United States Department of Commerce as the Deputy General Counsel for Strategic Initiatives.

== Consumer Product Safety Commission (CPSC) ==
On July 2, 2021, President Joe Biden nominated Hoehn-Saric to be both a member and the chair of the Consumer Product Safety Commission. Hearings were held before the Senate Commerce Committee on July 28, 2021. The committee favorably reported his nomination to the Senate floor on September 22, 2021. Hoehn-Saric was confirmed by the entire Senate via voice vote on October 7, 2021.

Hoehn-Saric started his position in October 2021. In office, Hoehn-Saric has cautioned consumers from believing that products on shelves are necessarily safe and have met government approval before sale.

On May 9, 2025, President Donald Trump fired Hoehn-Saric and two other Democratic members of the commission. On June 13, 2025, Judge Matthew J. Maddox of the U.S. District Court for the District of Maryland ruled that their dismissals were improper and reinstated them to the commission. On July 23, 2025, the Supreme Court of the United States, in a 6-3 emergency ruling for the case Donald J. Trump v. Mary Boyle (2025), overturned Maddox's ruling and allow the firing of Hoehn-Saric and the two other Democratic members from the commission

== Personal life ==
Hoehn-Saric has a wife and they currently reside in Maryland with their son and daughter.
