= Robert S. Adler =

American consumer advocate

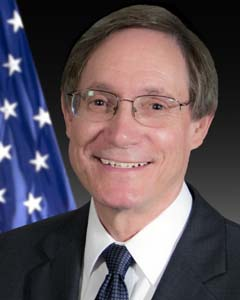

Chair of the Consumer Product Safety Commission
- Acting
- In office September 30, 2019 – October 27, 2021
- President: Donald Trump; Joe Biden
- Preceded by: Ann Marie Buerkle
- Succeeded by: Alexander Hoehn-Saric

Commissioner of the Consumer Product Safety Commission
- In office August 7, 2009 – October 27, 2021
- President: Barack Obama; Donald Trump; Joe Biden
- Preceded by: Stuart Statler
- Succeeded by: Richard Trumka Jr.

Personal details
- Party: Democratic Party
- Education: University of Pennsylvania; University of Michigan

Robert S. Adler is a consumer advocate in the United States. He was a member of the U.S. Consumer Product Safety Commission, and recently served as its acting chairman from October 2019 to October 2021. He is a Democrat, and became acting chair due to a surprise vote crossing party lines from former acting chair Ann Marie Buerkle.

== Work ==
Adler was a Professor of Legal Studies and the Luther H. Hodges, Jr. Scholar in Law & Ethics at the University of North Carolina at Chapel Hill's Kenan-Flagler Business School. He has served as the Associate Dean of the MBA Program and as Associate Dean for the School's Bachelor of Science in Business Administration Program. A recipient of teaching awards both within the business school and university-wide, Adler's research and teaching focus on consumer protection, product liability, ethics, regulation, and negotiation. Before joining the UNC faculty, Adler served as counsel on the United States House Committee on Energy and Commerce where he advised on CPSC legislative and oversight issues under the leadership of Henry Waxman. Prior to that, he spent eleven years (from 1973 to 1984) as an attorney-advisor to two commissioners at the CPSC in Washington, D.C. One of the commissioners he worked for was R. David Pittle, an original appointee at the CPSC. Before joining the CPSC's staff, Adler served as a Deputy Attorney General for the Pennsylvania Justice Department, where he headed the southwest regional office of the Pennsylvania Bureau of Consumer Protection. Adler has been elected six times to the board of directors of Consumers Union, publisher of Consumer Reports magazine. He also served on the Obama-Biden Presidential Transition Team and co-authored the agency review report on the CPSC. Adler graduated from the University of Pennsylvania and received his J.D. from the University of Michigan.

== U.S. Consumer Product Safety Commission ==
During his tenure at the CPSC, Adler stated "injuries and death from consumer products begin to accelerate dramatically once consumers hit age 75." Adler also criticized provisions in the CPSC's organic statute that govern information-sharing by the CPSC.

Citing several operational issues, House Energy and Commerce Committee Chair Cathy McMorris Rodgers stated at a July 2024 hearing that “the Commission fell into disrepair" under Adler's leadership.

== Agency shutdown controversy ==
During the COVID-19 pandemic, then-acting chairman Adler faced criticism for secretly suspending key operations of the U.S. Consumer Product Safety Commission (CPSC) for several months. According to investigations by USA Today in 2020 and 2021, the agency halted routine screening of imported consumer products at U.S. ports, including high-risk items such as children's toys and other goods that could contain hazardous materials like lead or phthalates. The halt in inspections coincided with the 2020 holiday shopping season and raised concerns that potentially unsafe products were entering the U.S. market without oversight.

The lack of screening drew bipartisan condemnation from members of Congress, who expressed concern over risks to consumer safety, particularly for children. Senator Richard Blumenthal stated, “The total lack of inspections is absolutely inexcusable, especially because of the concealment.” In defense of the agency’s actions, Adler stated that "Lead in toys is not the biggest lead hazard to kids."

== Selected works ==
- Adler, Robert S.; Popper, Andrew F. (February 2019). "The Misuse of Product Misuse: Victim Blaming at Its Worst." William & Mary Business Law Review. 10 (2): 337.
- Adler, Robert S. (14 August 2011). "Opinion: Moving forward on product safety - Robert S. Adler". Politico.
- Adler, Robert S.; Nord, Nancy; Stratton, Harold D. "Hal" (4 June 2010). "Consumer Product Safety Commission podcast". Federalist Society.
- Adler, Robert S. (Winter 1989). "From "model agency" to basket case - can the Consumer Product Safety Commission be Redeemed?". Administrative Law Review. 41 (1): 61.

Political offices
Preceded by Stuart Statler	Commissioner of the United States Consumer Product Safety Commission; 2009–2021	Succeeded by Richard Trumka Jr.
