= Thomas Hill Moore =

American politician (1937–2022)

- Born: February 2, 1937
- Died: January 21, 2022 (aged 84)
- Education: Jacksonville University; University of Florida College of Law
- Known for: Commissioner, U.S. Consumer Product Safety Commission

Thomas Hill Moore (February 2, 1937 – January 21, 2022) was a commissioner of the Consumer Product Safety Commission, an independent agency of the U.S. federal government. He was first appointed to the commission by President Bill Clinton in 1995 to complete an unexpired term and was reappointed by Clinton to a full seven-year term in 1996. Moore was appointed to a third term by President George W. Bush in 2003. This term expired in 2010. He served an additional year after the expiration of his term, as commissioners are permitted to do until their successors are appointed. Moore's seat was filled by Marietta S. Robinson.

== Early life and education ==
Moore was born on February 2, 1937. He attended Jacksonville University, earning a Bachelor of Science degree in accounting, before attending law school at the University of Florida.

== Career ==
Before being nominated as Commissioner of the U.S. Consumer Product Safety Commission, Moore served as legislative counsel to U.S. Senator John Breaux and before that, to U.S. Senator Dick Stone.

=== The U.S. Consumer Product Safety Commission ===
Moore served as a Commissioner for the U.S. Consumer Product Safety Commission for 16 years and is considered the agency's longest-serving member. He was first nominated in 1995 by President Bill Clinton to fill an unexpired term and then reappointed to a full seven-year term by Clinton in 1996. Moore was appointed by President George W. Bush in 2003 and served in that capacity until his retirement in October 2011.

He served as the Acting Chairman of the Commission twice: first from November 2001 to August 2002, and second from May 2009 until October 2011.

== Death ==
Moore died on January 21, 2022, at the age of 84.
