= United States Consumer Product Safety Commission =

United States government agency

- Seal

Agency overview
- Formed: October 24, 1972; 54 years ago
- Headquarters: Washington, D.C. U.S.
- Employees: 459
- Annual budget: $135 million (FY 2026 Budget Request)
- Agency executive: Peter Feldman, Acting Chairman
- Website: cpsc.gov

The United States Consumer Product Safety Commission (USCPSC or CPSC) is an independent agency of the United States federal government. The CPSC seeks to promote the safety of consumer products by addressing "unreasonable risks" of injury (through coordinating recalls, evaluating products that are the subject of consumer complaints or industry reports, etc.); developing uniform safety standards (some mandatory, some through a voluntary standards process); and conducting research into product-related illness and injury.

The agency was created by section 4 of the Consumer Product Safety Act in 1972. The agency reports to Congress and the president; it is not part of any other department or agency in the federal government. The CPSC has five commissioners, who are nominated by the president and confirmed by the Senate for staggered seven-year terms. Historically, the commission was often run by three commissioners or fewer. Since 2009, however, the agency has generally been led by five commissioners, one of whom serves as chairman. The commissioners set policy for the CPSC. The CPSC is headquartered in Washington, D.C.

== History ==
Old logo (1972–2018)

The agency was created by section 4 of the Consumer Product Safety Act (CPSA) in 1972. Upon signing the CPSA into law, President Richard Nixon stated that it was "the most significant consumer protection legislation passed by the 92nd Congress".

The CPSC’s creation was not without controversy, and the agency survived attempts to close it in its first decades. In 1981, President Ronald Reagan’s head of the Office of Management & Budget, David Stockman, sought to end the authorization for the agency to move it inside the Department of Commerce. The agency was given a new lease on life following agreement among U.S. senators.

On November 2, 2007, The Washington Post reported that between 2002 and the date of their report, former chairman Hal Stratton and current commissioner and former acting chairman Nancy Nord had taken more than 30 trips paid for by manufacturing groups or lobbyists representing industries that are under the supervision of the agency. According to the Post, the groups paid for over $60,000 travel and related expenses during this time.

On June 18, 2026, the Commission announced that it was moving from its longtime headquarters in Bethesda, Maryland to the Government Accountability Office Building in Washington, D.C.

=== Mid-2000s reform following the “Year of the Recall” ===
The year 2007 was called the “Year of the Recall” by some CPSC-watchers in the United States. The CPSC worked with manufacturers and importers on a record 473 voluntary recalls that year, and other U.S. federal agencies promoted other widely noted recalls. CPSC recalls included many incidents with lead in toys and other children’s products.

These issues led to the legislative interest in the reform of the agency, and the final result of these efforts was the passage of the Consumer Product Safety Improvement Act in 2008. The bill increased funding and staffing for the CPSC, placed stricter limits on lead levels in children’s products (redefined from products intended for children age seven and under to children age twelve and under), restricted certain phthalates in children’s toys and child care articles, and required mandatory testing and certification of applicable products. The Danny Keysar Child Product Notification Act required the CPSC to create a public database of recalled products and to provide consumers with a postage-paid postcard for each durable infant or toddler product. This act was named after Danny Keysar, who died in a recalled crib. Danny’s parents, Linda E. Ginzel and Boaz Keysar, founded Kids In Danger and were instrumental in working with the CPSC to strengthen product safety standards.

The public database (saferproducts.gov), constructed at a cost of around US$3 million and launched in March 2011, “publicizes complaints from virtually anyone who can provide details about a safety problem connected with any of the 15,000 kinds of consumer goods regulated by the CPSC”. While lauded by consumer advocates for making previously hidden information available, manufacturers have expressed their concern “that most of the complaints are not first vetted by the CPSC before they are made public,” meaning it could be abused and potentially used to target specific brands. As of mid-April 2011, the database was accruing about 30 safety complaints per day. By June 2018, the database had 36,544 reports, with an average of approximately 13.74 reports filed each day.

=== Later history ===
In 2012, following reports of consumers (mostly children) ingesting neodymium magnet toys, small, high-powered magnets made of rare earth materials such as neodymium, the commission voted to block sales of Maxfield & Oberton’s Buckyballs-branded toys, and later voted to issue a rule that would amount to a ban on all similar toys. Later, however, a federal appellate court overturned the ban, finding that the Commission had moved forward without adequate data. The decision vacating the ban was written by later-Supreme Court justice Neil Gorsuch.

The CPSC sued the maker of Britax jogging strollers, then settled with the company, in 2018. Reports attributed the change to the change in personnel after Republicans gained a majority on the commission, although some commentators noted the unusual circumstances of the commission suing over a product that met existing standards. The 2018 settlement included the company’s agreement to provide a replacement part to consumers. The replacement part—a bolt—itself was later recalled because it broke easily.

In 2019, the CPSC recalled inclined sleepers sold by multiple companies (including Mattel Fisher-Price’s Rock ’n Play as well as Kids II’s and Dorel’s rocking sleepers sold under a variety of brand names). The recalled products were associated with more than 100 infant deaths according to contemporary news reports. The controversy was among those that were tied to Acting Chairman Ann Marie Burekle’s announcement of her intention to step down after waiting for years for the U.S. Senate to act on her nomination to serve an additional term and be formally elevated to full chairmanship.

=== Second Trump administration ===
Boyle v. Trump
- Court: District of Maryland
- Started: May 21, 2025
- Docket nos.: 8:25-cv-01628 (D. Md.); 25-1687 (4th Cir.); 25A11 (SCOTUS)

Case history
- Appealed to: Fourth Circuit
- Subsequent action: district ruling stayed by Supreme Court via shadow docket

Court membership
- Judge sitting: Matthew J. Maddox

On May 9, 2025, President Donald Trump dismissed three Democratic CPSC commissioners—Richard Trumka Jr., Mary T. Boyle, and Alexander Hoehn-Saric—via email. The dismissals left only two commissioners, both Republicans. The Consumer Product Safety Act stipulates that CPSC commissioners can only be removed for neglect of duty or malfeasance in office, raising legal concerns about the legitimacy of the firings. Trumka Jr. responded to the dismissal with the statement, "I’ll see him in court," signaling a legal challenge to the move.

The firings prompted lawsuits alleging unlawful political interference, with plaintiffs seeking reinstatement under statutory protections for independent regulatory bodies. Without the dismissed commissioners, Feldman and Douglas Dziak operated the agency under a two-member quorum, which federal law allows for six months before requiring additional appointments.

On July 23, 2025, the Supreme Court granted an emergency order to the Trump Administration in a 6-3 decision and struck down the ruling set in June 2025 by Matthew Maddox, the judge for the US District Court of the District of Maryland which ordered the restatement of Mary Boyle, Alexander Hoehn-Saric and Richard Trumka Jr. to their positions on the Commission, in which Maddox cited Humphrey’s Executor v. United States (1935) behind the reasoning for the ruling.

== Activities ==
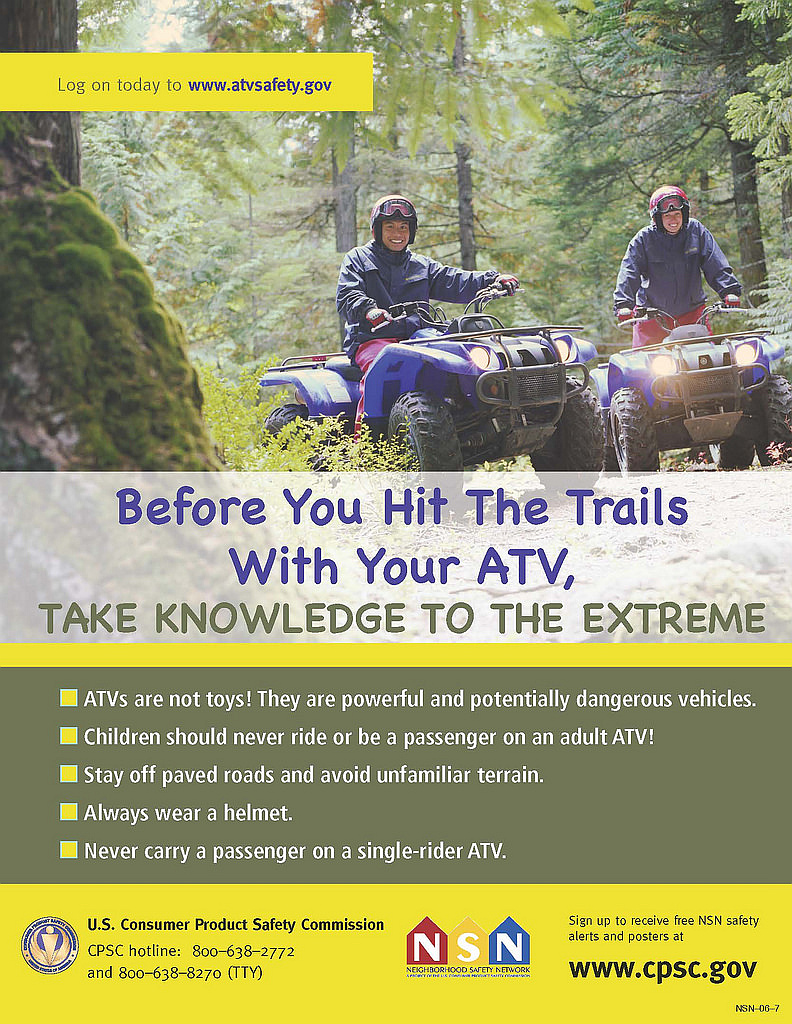
All-terrain vehicle safety poster

The CPSC regulates the manufacture and sale of more than 15,000 different consumer products, from cribs to all-terrain vehicles. Products excluded from the CPSC’s jurisdiction include those specifically named by law as under the jurisdiction of other federal agencies. For example, on-road automobiles are regulated by the National Highway Traffic Safety Administration, guns are regulated by the Bureau of Alcohol, Tobacco, Firearms, and Explosives, and drugs are regulated by the Food and Drug Administration.

The CPSC fulfills its mission by banning dangerous consumer products, establishing safety requirements for other consumer products, issuing recalls of products already on the market, and researching potential hazards associated with consumer products.

In part due to its small size, the CPSC attempts to coordinate with outside parties—including companies and consumer advocates—to leverage resources and expertise to achieve outcomes that advance consumer safety.

=== Recalls ===
The aspect of CPSC’s work that most U.S. citizens might recognize is the “recall,” formally a “corrective action” in which a company develops a “a comprehensive plan that reaches throughout the entire distribution chain to consumers who have the product” and addresses a potential or alleged failure of a product. Recalls are nearly always voluntary. While many recalls involve consumers returning consumer products to the manufacturer for a replacement or, more rarely, a refund, recalls have also involved tasks such as instructing users on how to clean an item or publishing a software patch. Most recalls recover very few consumer products, for a variety of hypothesized reasons. Industry and consumer advocates are often at odds over whether recalls need to be more effective, as many consumers may simply discard products that are the subject of recalls. Whether a consumer learns of a recall in the first place is a different question. One commissioner has called for companies to spend as much on recall advertising as the companies do on their advertising of the products before recalls.

=== Rulemaking and enforcement ===
The CPSC makes rules about consumer products when it identifies a consumer product hazard that is not already addressed by an industry voluntary consensus standard, or when Congress directs it to do so. Its rules can specify basic design requirements, or they can amount to product bans, as in the case of small high-powered magnets, which the CPSC attempted to ban. For certain infant products, the CPSC regulates even when voluntary standards exist. The CPSC is required to follow a rigorous, scientific process to develop mandatory rules. Failing to do so can justify the revocation of a rule, as was the case in a Tenth Circuit decision vacating the CPSC’s ban on small high-powered magnets.

Since February 2015, the average civil penalty has been $2.9 million. In April 2018, Polaris Industries agreed to pay a record $27.25 million civil penalty for failing to report defective off-road vehicles.

=== Information gathering and sharing ===
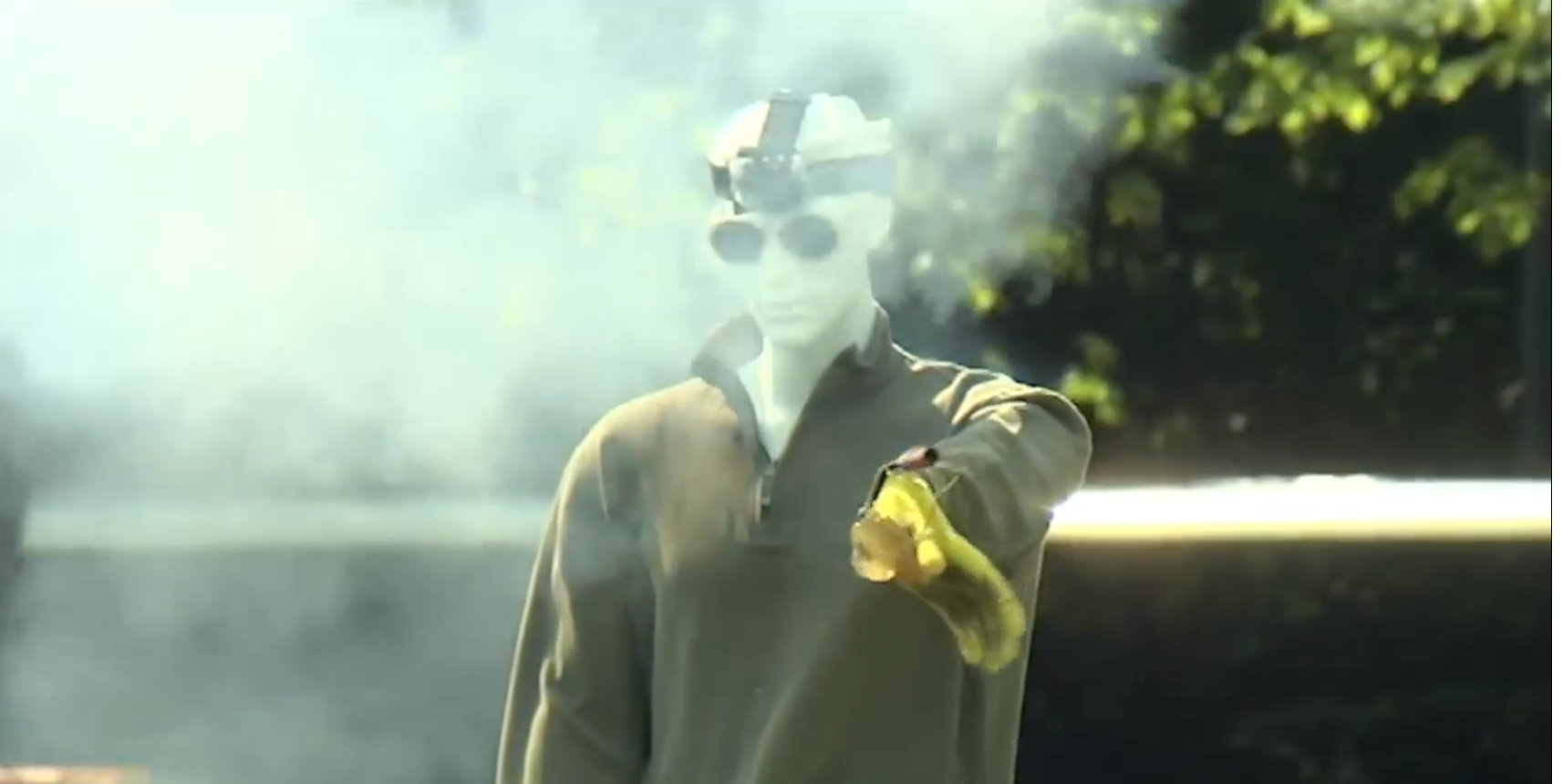
Mannequin targeted in CPSC Fireworks Safety Demonstration 2017

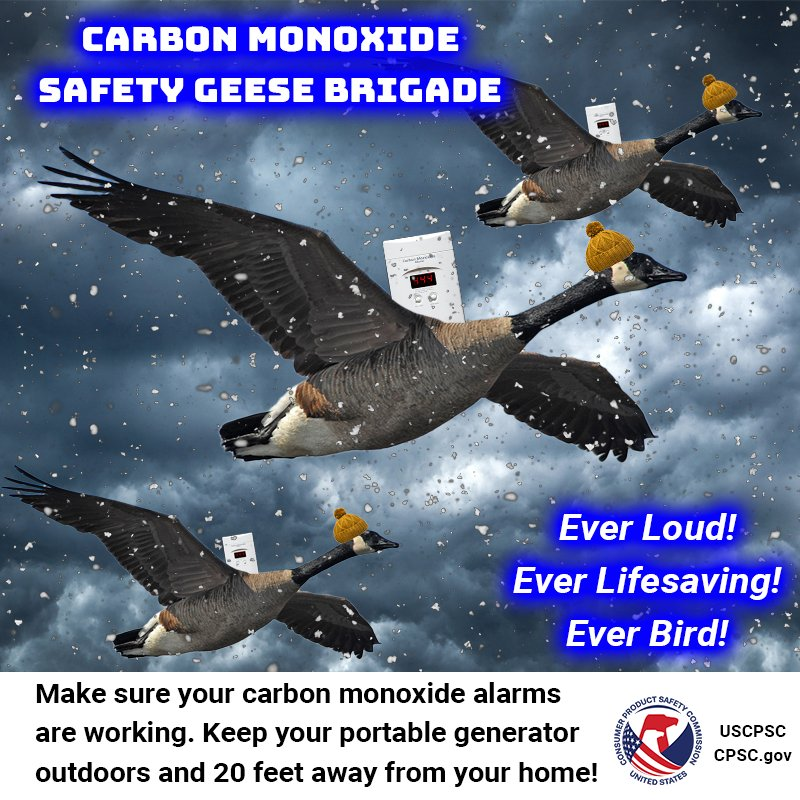
An example of a surrealist PSA made by the CPSC posted online

The CPSC learns about unsafe products in several ways. The agency maintains a consumer hotline through which consumers may report concerns about unsafe products or injuries associated with products. Product safety concerns may also be submitted through SaferProducts.gov. The agency also operates the National Electronic Injury Surveillance System (NEISS), a probability sample of about 100 hospitals with 24-hour emergency rooms. NEISS collects data on consumer product related injuries treated in ERs and can be used to generate national estimates.

The agency also works with and shares information with other governments, both in the U.S. (with states and public health agencies) and with international counterparts.

The CPSC works on a variety of publicity campaigns to raise awareness of safety. For example, the CPSC annually blows up mannequins to demonstrate the dangers of improper use of fireworks. On Twitter and Bluesky, the CPSC has made extensive use of PSA images done in a crude surrealist style, usually consisting of various stock images put together. On September 20, 2023, the CPSC released an album containing PSA songs in various styles.

In connection with the U.S. swimming season (the northern hemisphere’s summer, roughly May to September), the CPSC conducts the “Pool Safely” campaign to prevent drowning through methods such as building fences and supporting education programs. Other efforts include attempts to prevent suction entrapment, which can kill by trapping a swimmer underwater, by eviscerating a swimmer’s internal organs (when a suction tube lacks a cover), or otherwise. The CPSC has authorities under the Virginia Graeme Baker Pool and Spa Safety Act.

== Budget and staff ==
In 1972 when the agency was created, it had a budget of $34.7 million and 786 staff members. By 2008 it had 401 employees on a budget of $43 million. After the Consumer Product Safety Improvement Act was passed in the same year that increased significantly, with at least 500 full-time employees with a budget of $136.4 million in ~2014. Funding dropped to $127 million as of the commission’s fiscal year 2019 appropriation, and it continues to have slightly more than 500 employees.

== Leadership and Structure ==
The five commissioners of the CPSC are appointed by the U.S. president and with the consent of the U.S. Senate. As with some other U.S. federal independent agencies, commissioners are selected as members of political parties. Although the president is entitled by statute to select the chairman (with the consent of the Senate), no more than three commissioners may belong to the same party. Thus, the president is generally expected to consult with members of the opposite party in the Senate to select members of the commission from the opposite party. The commissioners (including the chairman) vote on selecting the vice chairman, who becomes acting chairman if the chairman’s term ends upon resignation or expiration.

=== Chairmen ===
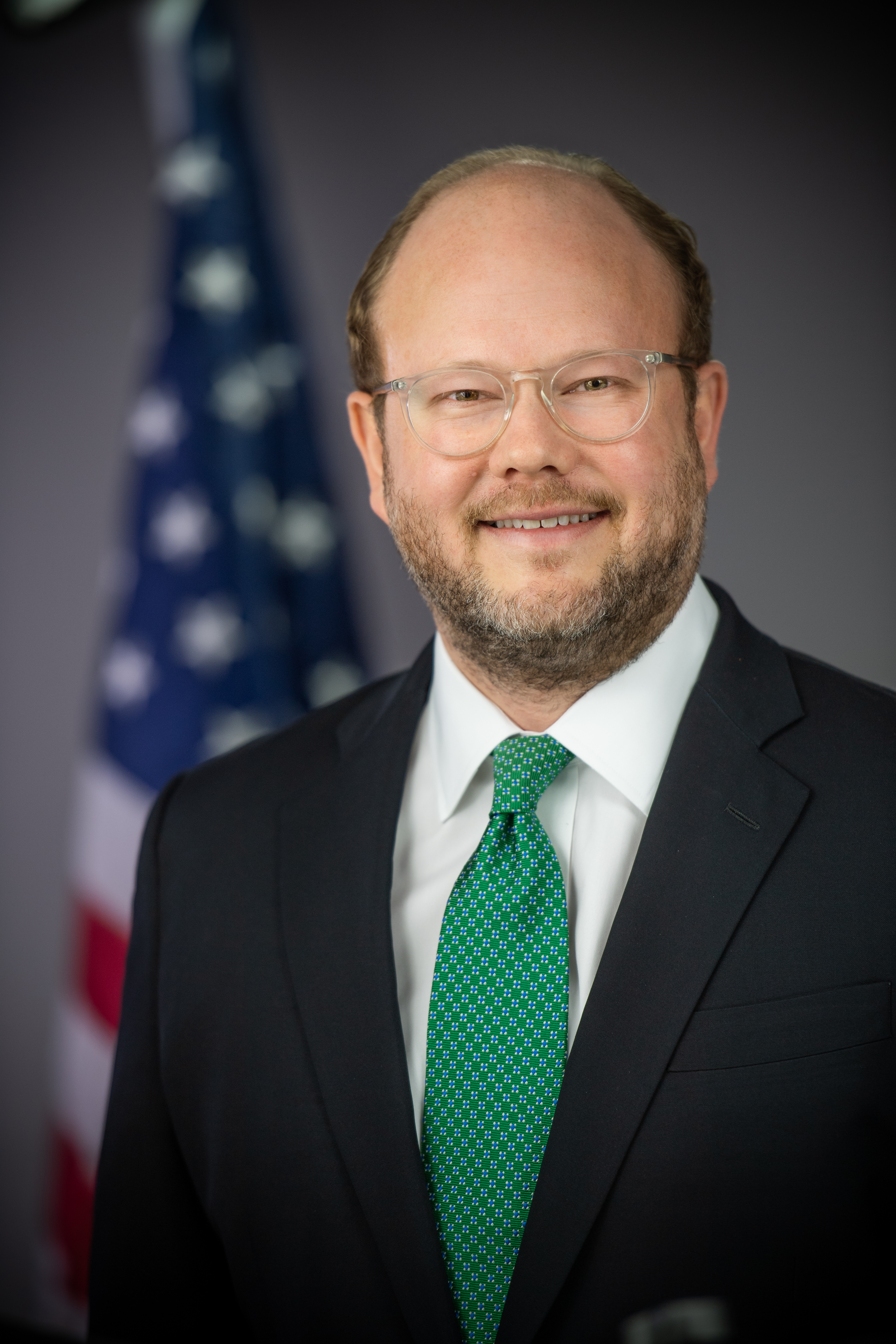
Acting Chairman Peter Feldman

The commission is led by acting Chairman Peter Feldman, a Republican, who assumed office after former chair Alexander Hoehn-Saric resigned in January 2025. Prior to Hoehn-Saric's 2021 confirmation, the commission had not had a Senate-confirmed chairman since 2017, when Elliot F. Kaye stepped down as chair following a White House request after Donald Trump’s inauguration. In March 2020, President Trump nominated Nancy Beck, an official at the U.S. Environmental Protection Agency who previously worked for an association representing the U.S. chemical industry, to chair the commission, but it was not acted on by the Senate.

Chairmen since 1973
Name	Tenure	Position (acting or full)
Richard O. Simpson	May 14, 1973 – June 1, 1976	Full
S. John Byington	June 2, 1976 – June 30, 1978	Full
Susan B. King	March 6, 1978 – January 31, 1981	Full
Stuart M. Statler	February 1, 1981 – May 31, 1981	Acting
R. David Pittle	June 1, 1981 – August 3, 1981	Acting
Nancy Harvey Steorts	August 4, 1981 – December 30, 1984	Full
Terrence Scanlon	December 31, 1984 – December 20, 1985	Full (recess appointment)
Carol G. Dawson	December 21, 1985 – May 31, 1986	Acting
Anne Graham	June 1, 1986 – July 16, 1986	Acting
Terrence Scanlon	July 17, 1986 – January 3, 1989	Full
Anne Graham	January 4, 1989 – November 26, 1989	Acting
Jacqueline Jones-Smith	November 27, 1989 – March 9, 1994	Full
Ann Brown	March 10, 1994 – November 1, 2001	Full
Thomas Hill Moore	November 2, 2001 – August 1, 2002	Acting
Hal Stratton	August 2, 2002 – July 15, 2006	Full
Nancy Nord	July 15, 2006 – June 1, 2009	Acting
Thomas Hill Moore	June 1, 2009 - June 23, 2009	Acting
Inez Tenenbaum	June 23, 2009 – November 29, 2013	Full
Robert S. Adler	December 4, 2013 – July 29, 2014	Acting
Elliot F. Kaye	July 31, 2014 – February 8, 2017	Full
Ann Marie Buerkle	February 8, 2017 – September 30, 2019	Acting
Robert S. Adler	September 30, 2019 – October 27, 2021	Acting
Alexander Hoehn-Saric	October 12, 2021 – January 21, 2025	Full
Peter Feldman	January 21, 2025 - present	Acting

=== Current commissioners ===
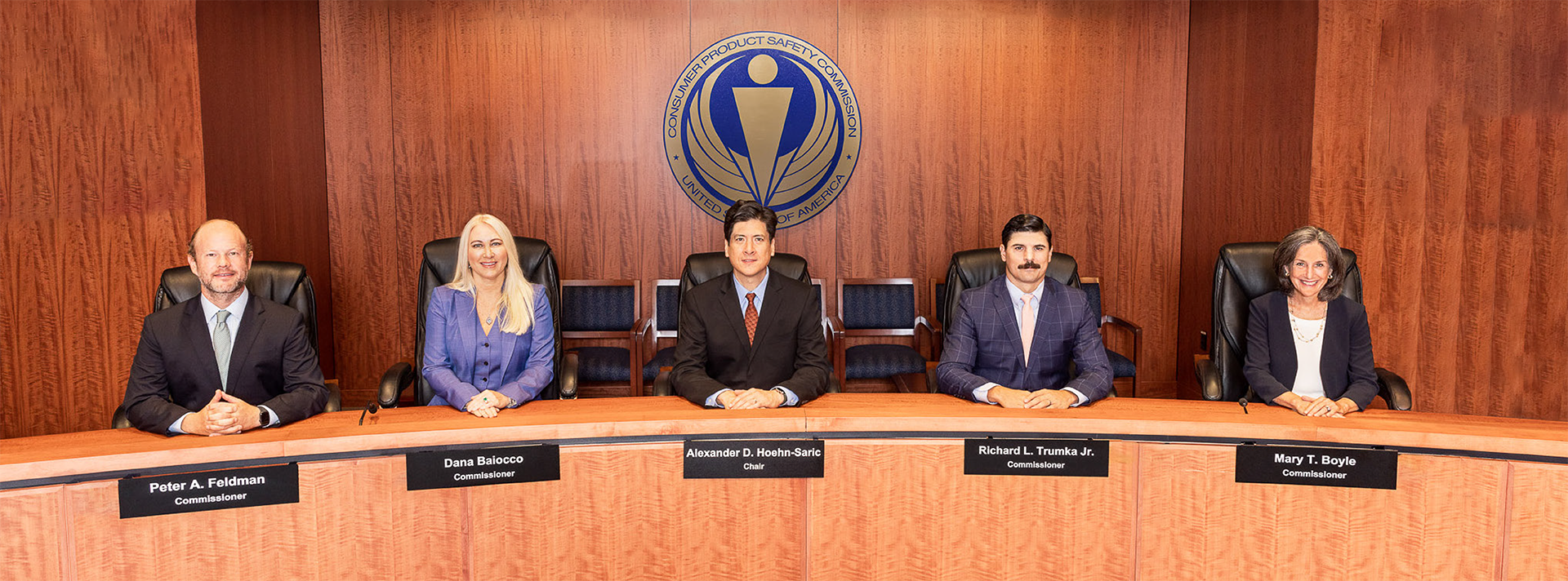
Members of the U.S. Consumer Product Safety Commission in 2022: (Left to right) Peter Feldman, Dana Baiocco, Alexander Hoehn-Saric, Richard Trumka Jr., and Mary Boyle

The current CPSC members as of September 15, 2026:

Position	Name	Party	Took office	Term expires
Chair	Peter Feldman (Acting)	Republican	October 5, 2018	October 26, 2026
Member	Karen Sessions	Republican	August 19, 2026	October 26, 2031
Member	Brien Lorenze	Republican	September 8, 2026	October 26, 2032
Member	Vacant	—N/a	—	October 26, 2027
Member	Vacant	—N/a	—	October 26, 2028

=== Nominations ===
President Trump has nominated the following to fill a seat on the commission. They await Senate confirmation.

Position	Name	Party	Term expires	Replacing
Chairman	Peter Feldman	Republican	—N/a	Alexander Hoehn-Saric
Member	Peter Feldman	Republican	October 26, 2033	Reappointment

=== Staff Offices ===
The Commission is served by a variety of staff offices which perform functions in support of its safety mission and operations.

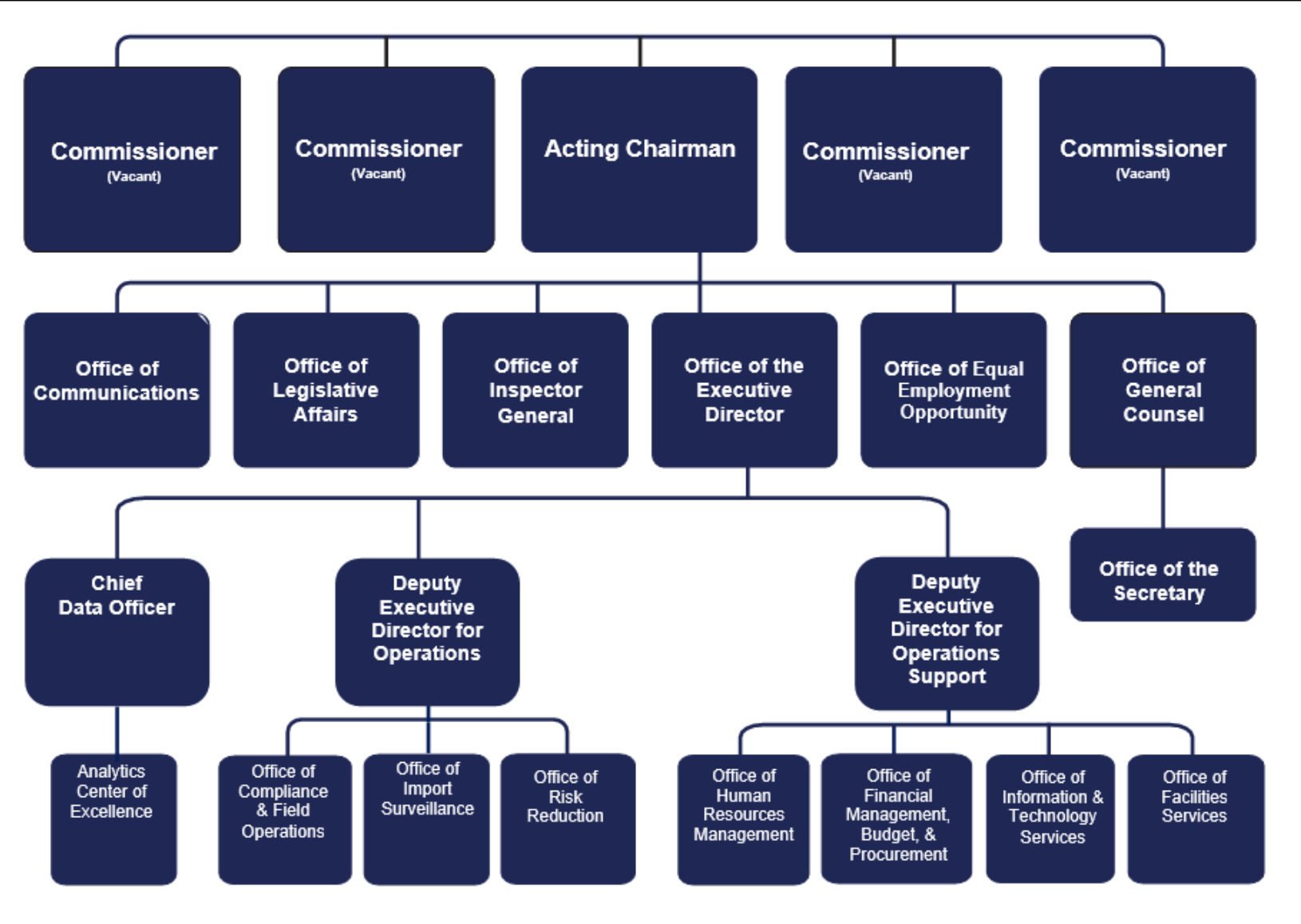
CPSC Organizational Chart as submitted in its FY 2027 Budget Request

==== Office of Compliance and Field Operations ====
The Office of Compliance and Field Operations (EXC) includes investigators, compliance officers, and attorneys that work with the agency’s technical experts to identify and evaluate potentially hazardous products. If EXC determines that a product violates a mandatory standard or presents a substantial product hazard, it seeks voluntary corrective action (recall) from firms to protect consumers and remove the product from the marketplace, and if necessary, issues public notice and/or pursues mandatory recalls through litigation. EXC also enforces firms’ compliance with mandatory reporting requirements, including through civil penalty enforcement. EXC educates stakeholders about product safety requirements. EXC also supports ongoing rulemaking and hazard analysis activities.

==== Office of Risk Reduction ====
The Office of Risk Reduction (EXRR) is responsible for managing CPSC’s Hazard Identification and Analysis (HIA) and Hazard Assessment and Reduction (HAR) programs. EXRR executes these efforts through collection and analysis of data to identify hazards and hazard patterns and to evaluate the risks associated with consumer products; development of mandatory standards; collaboration with voluntary standards development organizations (SDOs); technical work and laboratory testing to support HAR, Compliance, and Import Surveillance programs; and technical evaluation of petitions submitted to the Commission.

==== Office of Import Surveillance ====
The Office of Import Surveillance (EXIS) coordinates with the U.S. Department of Homeland Security’s (DHS) U.S. Customs and Border Protection (CBP) to prevent violative or hazardous products from entering the United States. EXIS co-locates investigators at select high-volume ports of entry to identify and interdict shipments that are at high risk of not complying with CPSC requirements.

==== Office of International Programs ====
The Office of International Programs (EXIP) has activities that are focused on improving product safety compliance by industry stakeholders abroad and on cooperating with foreign governments to improve product safety. Activities include conducting cooperative programs, training, and informational activities in foreign jurisdictions in the interest of American consumers

==== Office of Information & Technology Services ====
The Office of Information & Technology Services (EXIT) is tasked with the design, implementation, development, operation, maintenance, protection, and modernization of the agency’s IT systems, networks, and services.

==== Office of Communications ====
The Office of Communications (OCM) is responsible for raising public awareness through timely and targeted information about consumer product safety issues and helping to empower individual citizens with information. This includes outreach on product safety hazards associated with deaths or injuries and notifying the public about recalls and new Commission-implemented safety requirements. OCM uses a variety of channels to reach the public, including traditional, digital, and social media, as well as events and activities. OCM also uses syndicating tools to ensure that recalls and safety messages are widely distributed in a timely fashion to the media, to email subscribers and other communication platforms.

==== Other Offices ====
According to the Commission's 2025 Operating Plan, the agency is also served by the following offices:

- Office of the Executive Director
- Office of General Counsel (OGC)
- Office of the Secretary
- Office of Financial Management, Planning, & Evaluation (EXFM)
- Office of Human Resources Management (EXHR)
- Office of Facilities Services (EXFS)
- Office of Legislative Affairs (OLA)
- Office of Equal Employment Opportunity and Employee Engagement (OEEOEE)

==== Office of Inspector General ====
CPSC also has an independent Inspector General whose stated mission is to "detect and deter fraud, waste, abuse, and mismanagement in CPSC programs.

The current inspector general is Christopher W. Dentel.

== See also ==
- Child-resistant packaging
- Consumer Product Safety Improvement Act
- Injury prevention
- Lead-based paint in the United States
- Title 16 of the Code of Federal Regulations
- Toy safety
