= Commission on the Future of Higher Education =

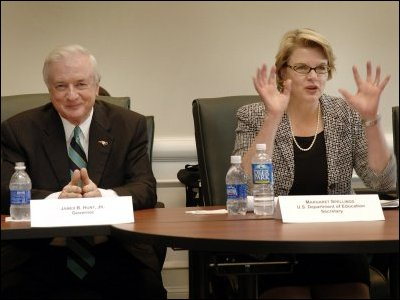
Secretary Spellings and former North Carolina Governor James B. Hunt at the announcement of the Secretary's Commission on the Future of Higher Education

The formation of a Commission on the Future of Higher Education, also known as the Spellings Commission, was announced on September 19, 2005, by U.S. Secretary of Education Margaret Spellings. The nineteen-member commission was charged with recommending a national strategy for reforming post-secondary education, with a particular focus on how well colleges and universities are preparing students for the 21st-century workplace, as well as a secondary focus on how well high schools are preparing students for post-secondary education. In the report, released on September 26, 2006, the Commission focuses on four key areas: access, affordability (particularly for non-traditional students), the standards of quality in instruction, and the accountability of institutions of higher learning to their constituencies (students, families, taxpayers, and other investors in higher education). After the report's publication, implementation of its recommendations was the responsibility of U.S. Under Secretary of Education, Sara Martinez Tucker (appointed August 2006).

== Formation and motivation ==
A significant motivation behind the Spellings Commission's formation was the fear that the American higher education system is deteriorating and failing to prepare the American workforce for the rigors and competitiveness of the globalized marketplace. The Spellings Commission opens its report by stating that “higher education in the United States has become one of our greatest success stories.” but moving into the 21 century, the commission bluntly states in its preamble how [foreign higher education systems] are passing us by at a time when education is more important to our collective prosperity than ever. The commission emphasizes the relationship between industry, education, and the government.

Presidential commissions on education have been relatively common since The Truman Report in 1947. Other notable groups include President Eisenhower's "Committee on Education Beyond the High School," (1956), President Kennedy's Task Force on Education (1960), and President Reagan's National Commission on Excellence in Education, which produced A Nation at Risk (1983).

=== Membership ===
- Charles Miller (Chairman) Private Investor, Former Chairman of the Board of Regents, University of Texas System
- Nicholas Donofrio, Executive Vice President, Innovation and Technology, IBM Corporation
- James J. Duderstadt, President Emeritus, University Professor of Science and Engineering; Director, The Millennium Project, University of Michigan
- Gerri Elliott, Corporate Vice President, Worldwide Public Sector, Microsoft Corporation
- Jonathan N. Grayer, Chairman and CEO, Kaplan, Inc.
- Kati Haycock, Director, The Education Trust
- James B. Hunt, Jr., Chairman, Hunt Institute for Educational Policy and Leadership; Former Governor of North Carolina
- Arturo Madrid, Murchison Distinguished Professor of Humanities, Department of Modern Languages and Literatures, Trinity University
- Robert Mendenhall, President, Western Governors University
- Charlene R. Nunley, President, Montgomery College
- Catherine B. Reynolds, Chairman and CEO, Catherine B. Reynolds Foundation, EduCap, Inc.
- Arthur J. Rothkopf, Senior Vice President and Counselor to the President, U.S. Chamber of Commerce; President Emeritus, Lafayette College
- Richard (Rick) Stephens, Senior Vice President, Human Resources and Administration, The Boeing Company
- Louis W. Sullivan, President Emeritus, Morehouse School of Medicine, Former Secretary of the U.S. Department of Health and Human Services
- Sara Martinez Tucker, President and CEO, Hispanic Scholarship Fund
- Richard Vedder, Adjunct Scholar, American Enterprise Institute, Distinguished Professor of Economics, Ohio University
- Charles M. Vest, President Emeritus, Professor of Mechanical Engineering, Massachusetts Institute of Technology
- David Ward, President of the American Council on Education (did not sign the final report)
- Robert M. Zemsky, Chair and Professor, The Learning Alliance for Higher Education, University of Pennsylvania

== Report ==
The published report (pdf) (first available on September 26, 2006 as a pre-publication copy), was titled A Test of Leadership: Charting the Future of U.S. Higher Education. It proposed several solutions to the problems facing higher education today, corresponding to the primary concerns of the commission: access, affordability, quality, accountability, and innovation.

=== Access ===
According to the Commission, access to higher education "is unduly limited by the complex interplay of inadequate preparation, lack of information about college opportunities, and persistent financial barriers" (Commission Report 5). The Commission blames the lack of communication between colleges and high schools as one source of the problem. The authors stated that "forty-four percent of university faculty members say students aren't well prepared for college-level writing, in contrast to the 90 percent of high school teachers who think they are prepared" and "only 17 percent of seniors are considered proficient in mathematics, and just 36 percent are proficient in reading." In response to those figures, the Commission proposed linking the expectations of college professors for incoming freshmen to the criteria required for students to graduate from high school by increasing communication between the two groups. The Commission "strongly encourages early assessment initiatives that determine whether students are on track for college." Another proposal of the Report was an increase in the use of open content and open source at the collegiate level to increase access to more people.

=== Affordability ===
Another dilemma that the Commission faced regarding access to higher education was the availability of low-income families and, to a lesser extent, students of minority groups. The authors stated, "There is ample evidence that qualified young people from families of modest means are far less likely to go to college than their affluent peers with similar qualifications." The Commission recommended shortening the FAFSA form to encourage more people to apply for financial aid to lessen the stress of paying for college. The report also called for greater productivity and efficiency of the financial aid system. State funding for higher education has fallen to the lowest levels the nation has seen in two decades, and the Commission proposed that Universities be held accountable for their "spending decisions... based on their own limited resources."

=== Quality ===
The Commission urged colleges and universities to embrace innovative ideas for new teaching methods, such as distance learning, to improve the quality of higher education. The Commission also stated that organization and nationwide reform are vital to repairing higher education problems. Modifying the curricula and assessments nationwide would help distinguish students in the academic world.

=== Accountability ===
The Commission proposed creating a public database where all could view statistics and other information about colleges and universities to clarify the haziness of accountability. The information that would be made available in the proposed database would include the cost, price, admissions data, and college completion rates. The database could eventually even contain data such as the "learning outcomes of students." The Commission argued that colleges might have a more vested interest in the success of their students if this information were made public to prospective students and their parents.

=== Innovation ===
American universities have not adequately prioritized innovation and creativity as important learning outcomes. The Commission advocated that "policymakers and educators need to do more to build America’s capacity to compete and innovate by investing in critical skill sets and basic research. Institutions and government agencies have failed to sustain and nurture innovation in our colleges and universities. The Commission found that the results of scholarly research on teaching and learning were rarely translated into practice, especially for those working at the grassroots level in fields such as teacher preparation and math and science education" (15). Although the Commission did not point this out, the accepted practice of research in higher education requires scholars to fit their research in with pre-existing scholarly conversations, which can limit the development of new ideas and risky experimentation. Additionally, universities and government officials enacting policy and controlling monetary resources have been slow to adapt to the future and reluctant to provide the resources necessary for creative ventures, "with the exception of several promising practices, many of our postsecondary institutions have not embraced opportunities for innovation, from new methods of teaching and content delivery to technological advances to meeting [sic] the increasing demand for lifelong learning. We also find that for their part, both state and federal policymakers have failed to prioritize supporting innovation by adequately providing incentives for individuals, employers, and institutions to pursue more opportunities for innovative, effective, and efficient practice" (16). If universities were re-structured according to interdisciplinary emphases and topics, innovation could occur efficiently: "At a time when innovation occurs increasingly at the intersection of multiple disciplines (including business and social sciences), curricula and research funding remain largely contained in individual departments" (16).

== Criticism and controversy ==
Commission member David Ward refused to sign the final version, citing "several issues of serious concern" including the report's tendency to attribute problems with multiple causes entirely to the state of higher education.

After the publication of the report, it has been the target of criticism from prominent individuals in higher education, including Robert Berdahl, president of the Association of American Universities (and not a commission member), who stated that the report lacked a "nuanced understanding" of the realities of higher education.

Privacy advocates have criticized the call for a national student database, which Spellings and the commission have argued should include information on individual students' performance.

Microsoft's Gerri Elliot, a commission member, sparred with other commission members over the inclusion of a discussion of the benefits of open source software and open content.

== Response to commission recommendations ==
The Higher Education Consumers Resource took exception to the report, citing inadequate research on root cause of the problems. With over 80% of all Americans having successfully completed 12 years of school, that fewer than 25% go on to successfully complete a college degree is meaningful. In Ohio alone, there are eight colleges that graduate less than 35% of the full-time freshman class within six years. This indicates serious institutional barriers to success within those institutions. Higher Education Consumers Resource believes academic and career advising from independent sources not beholden to the college or university is one step towards reducing dismal successful college completion rates.

But the National Center for Public Policy and Higher Education's "Measuring Up 2006: The National Report Card on Higher Education" focuses on most of the same areas as Spellings Commission report. The "report card" looks at individual states and assesses the status of their higher education since 2000. Although the National Center for Public Policy and Higher Education is not directly affiliated with the commission, there is significant overlap in not only the areas of concern, but in some of the membership (notably James B. Hunt, Jr. and Arturo Madrid). Spellings is quoted as saying that she is proud her report has similarities to the National Center's report.

One of the most controversial proposed implementations of the report's recommendations is the proposal for a federally managed system to record the progress of individual college students. The Department of Education has proposed revamp or expand the current Integrated Postsecondary Education Data System, arguing that a database is necessary to sufficiently assess the status of universities and college students nationwide. University and pro-privacy advocates fear that such a plan would require universities to submit much more information causing vast increases in cost and time commitment to the universities and could be regarded as an invasion of students' privacy. The Department of Education addresses some of these anxieties on a "Myth vs. Fact" page posted to the DOE web site on September 29, 2006.

Some universities are beginning to use and modify learning management systems to create information systems that provide for a means of articulating institutional, classroom and personal learning outcomes at all levels as well as means to consistently rate performance toward those objectives. Alternative solutions are being researched, while the Spellings commissions was seeking funding for test projects in the 2008 federal budget. "Goal Aware Tools" development effort is one such attempt.

Additionally, some disciplinary organizations, such as the National Council of Teachers of English and the Council of Writing Program Administrators, have begun to demonstrate the ways in which member institutions engage in assessment practices designed to improve student learning. They make the case, advanced in documents like the NCTE-WPA White Paper on Writing Assessment in Colleges and Universities, that good assessment is locally contextualized, based in the principles of the discipline, and must be used to improve teaching and learning at the local level.

== Implementation ==
Since the US Department of Education published the Spellings Commission report on September 26, 2006, Spellings has pushed for progress in implementing the recommendations, progress that faces the challenge of working with limited time before the 2008 presidential elections. This push for tangible changes in the remainder of her term has included:

- The appointment of Sara Martinez Tucker as U.S. Under Secretary for Education by the U.S. Senate. Tucker was nominated by President George W. Bush in August 2006, but not confirmed until December. With Spellings, Tucker has created a more limited list of short and long-term goals for implementing the Commission Report's recommendations, a list headed by plans to increase the efficiency of the financial aid system, to create greater access to higher education, and to ensure that high school students are better prepared for college.
- Plans to simplify the Free Application for Federal Student Aid (FAFSA), and to notify students before the spring of their senior year whether or not they would qualify for aid.
- A push to make comparative evaluation of individual universities' performance more possible, particularly through revamping or expanding the current Integrated Postsecondary Education Data System (a push that has been met with some resistance by higher education interests).

== Related acts ==
The Higher Education Opportunity Act (enacted August 2008) has stated:

Nothing in this section shall be construed to permit the Secretary to establish any criteria that specifies, defines, or prescribes the standards that accrediting agencies or associations shall use to assess any institution’s success with respect to student achievement.
