= Under Secretary of Education =

U.S. government position

United States Under Secretary of Education
- Seal of the department

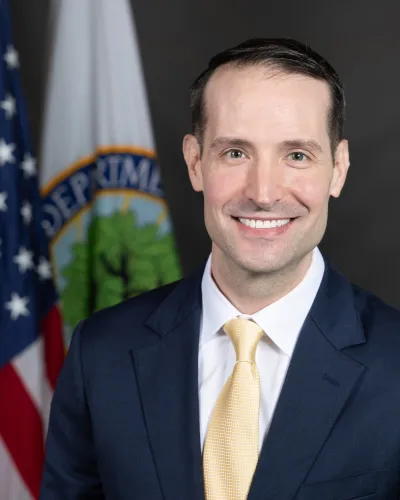
- Incumbent; Nicholas Kent since August 4, 2025
- United States Department of Education
- Reports to: Secretary of Education
- Seat: Washington, D.C.
- Appointer: The president; with Senate advice and consent
- Term length: No fixed term; 20 U.S.C. § 3412
- Website: https://sites.ed.gov/ous/

The under secretary of education role was established as the second-highest-ranking position in the United States Department of Education when the agency was established in 1979. With the addition of a deputy secretary position in 1991, the under secretary became the third highest. The under secretary of education is appointed by the president of the United States, with the approval of the United States Senate, to serve at the president's pleasure.

== Under secretaries and key deputies ==
Steven Alan Minter, an African American leader in Cleveland, was the first under secretary at the newly created agency, appointed by President Carter in 1979. Minter's deputies were Margaret McKenna, a civil rights attorney, and Michael Bakalis, who had recently run as the Democratic candidate for governor of Illinois. With Carter's loss in the 1980 presidential election, Minter left the role when Ronald Reagan took office in January 1981.

President Reagan appointed William C. Clohan, Jr., a veteran Republican staffer on Capitol Hill, as under secretary in 1981. One year later, Clohan resigned abruptly, reportedly pushed out as a response to conservative groups' complaints that Secretary of Education Ted Bell was too moderate in his views about the future of the federal role in education. Clohan was replaced by Gary L. Jones, a vice president at the conservative American Enterprise Institute.

In 1985, as William Bennett replaced Bell as secretary, Jones was replaced as under secretary by Gary L. Bauer, who later led the conservative Family Research Council. Bennett and Bauer together launched an effort to challenge the efficacy of bilingual education. Among a number of deputies was Bruce Carnes, who played a major role in the administration's efforts to address problems of fraud and abuse by for-profit colleges.

In 1987 Linus Wright, a Dallas educator, was appointed under secretary by President Reagan. He stayed in the role into the beginning of the George H. W. Bush administration. In 1989, Bush replaced Wright with Illinois schools chief Ted Sanders.

In 1991, incoming Secretary Lamar Alexander, added a deputy secretary role to the department, naming David T. Kearns, the CEO of Xerox Corporation to that position, while keeping Sanders as under secretary. The new deputy position was viewed as usurping the under as the second highest in the agency.

In 1993 President Clinton appointed Marshall (Mike) Smith, an advocate of standards-based school reform, to serve as his under secretary. After Madeleine Kunin left the deputy secretary role, Smith filled that role as acting and was formally nominated. At the time Smith predicted confirmation "might take quite a while." He held both positions—confirmed as under secretary and acting as deputy—for the remaining three years of the administration.

In 2001, President George W. Bush chose Gene Hickock, Pennsylvania secretary of education, as his under secretary of education. In 2003 Bush used recess appointments to make various personnel changes, leading to Edward R. McPherson serving as under secretary. Under the leadership of Secretary Margaret Spellings, in 2006 the under secretary role took on a higher education focus with the appointment of Sara Martinez Tucker, the president of the Hispanic Scholarship Fund, as under secretary.

The higher education focus of the under secretary office was continued by President Obama, who named Martha J. Kanter, a community college leader from California, to the role. Her deputy was initially Robert Shireman; he was succeeded by James Kvaal in 2010. Kanter resigned in 2013 and was replaced by Ted Mitchell, the CEO of the NewSchools Venture Fund and former president of Occidental College. His deputy, Jamie Studley, led the administration's examination of data that could be used to help students assess college quality and value, leading to the College Scorecard.

In his first term, President Trump did not nominate anyone to the under secretary role. He did continue the higher education focus of the position, appointing a deputy, Diane Auer Jones, as acting under secretary for the bulk of the administration. Jones revamped accreditation and other regulations to reduce federal oversight, particularly of for-profit colleges, where she had previously worked.

In 2021, President Biden nominated James Kvaal, the president of The Institute for College Access and Success and a former deputy under secretary, as under secretary. The senate confirmation vote was on September 13, 2021.

In 2025, at the beginning of his second term, President Trump nominated Nicholas Kent, the deputy secretary of education for the Commonwealth of Virginia, as under secretary. Kent was confirmed by the Senate on August 1, after a 50-45 vote split along party lines, with Republicans in favor and Democrats and Independents opposed.

== Role of the office in the Biden administration ==
In the Biden administration, the Office of the Under Secretary oversaw policies, programs, and activities related to post secondary education, vocational and adult education, and federal student aid.

During this time, the Office of the Under Secretary (OUS) was responsible for helping to implement the Secretary's Action Plan for Higher Education, which called for expanding the accessibility, affordability, and accountability of higher education for more Americans. Few of the action items were enacted prior to the end of the Biden administration in 2025.

Key posts reporting to the undersecretary:

Office	Officeholder
Executive Director of the Center for Faith and Opportunity Initiatives	Vacant
Executive Director of the White House Initiative on Historically Black Colleges and Universities	Vacant
Chief Operating Officer, Federal Student Aid	
Assistant Secretary, Office of Postsecondary Education	
Assistant Secretary, Office of Career, Technical, and Adult Education	
Executive Director of the White House Initiative on Educational Excellence for African Americans	Vacant
Executive Director of the White House Initiative on Educational Excellence for Hispanic Americans	Vacant
Executive Director of the White House Initiative on American Indian and Alaska Native Education	Vacant
