= Frank Holleman =

American lawyer

United States Deputy Secretary of Education
- In office December 28, 1999 – January 20, 2001
- President: Bill Clinton
- Preceded by: Marshall S. Smith
- Succeeded by: William D. Hansen

Personal details
- Born: Seneca, South Carolina
- Party: Democratic
- Education: Furman University (BA); Harvard Law School (JD); London School of Economics (MSc)
- Profession: Attorney

Frank Sharp Holleman, III is an attorney and politician from South Carolina who was the Democratic Party's nominee for South Carolina Superintendent of Education in 2010 and is a former United States Deputy Secretary of Education.

Holleman was born in Seneca, South Carolina and attended Furman University in Greenville, South Carolina. He graduated from Harvard Law School and served as a law clerk for Judge Harrison Lee Winter of the Fourth Circuit and Supreme Court Justice Harry Blackmun. He then worked as a partner at Wyche, Burgess, Freeman and Parham in Greenville, South Carolina.

Holleman served as chairman of the South Carolina Democratic Party from 1988 to 1990. In 1994, he was appointed by President Bill Clinton to serve in the Justice Department as a Deputy Assistant Attorney General, and later served as Chief of Staff for Secretary of Education Richard Riley. In 1999, Clinton recess appointed Holleman to serve as Deputy Secretary of Education, a post which he held until the end of the Clinton presidency.

Holleman served as campaign manager for Inez Tenenbaum's Senate campaign in 2004, and was rumored as a possible candidate for state Superintendent of Education in 2006. He did not run and Jim Rex won the Democratic nomination and the general election. After Rex decided not to run for re-election and instead ran for governor, Holleman announced his candidacy for Superintendent in the 2010 election. Holleman opposed tax credits or publicly funded vouchers for private school tuition, and supported an expansion of early childhood education and adoption of the Common Core Standards. He won the Democratic nomination against school administrator Tom Thompson. In the general election, Holleman raised a substantial amount of money, and the race was initially considered to be close, but he lost the general election to Republican nominee Mick Zais.

Holleman is now a senior litigating attorney at the Southern Environmental Law Center, where he has led the effort to litigate against power utilities over the disposal of coal ash, especially in the wake of the 2014 Dan River coal ash spill.

== See also ==
- List of law clerks for the second seat of the Supreme Court of the United States

Political offices
Preceded by Marshall S. Smith	United States Deputy Secretary of Education; 1999–2001	Succeeded by William D. Hansen
Party political offices
Preceded by Jim Rex	Democratic nominee for South Carolina Superintendent of Education; 2010	Succeeded by Tom Thompson
