= James Kvaal =

American political advisor

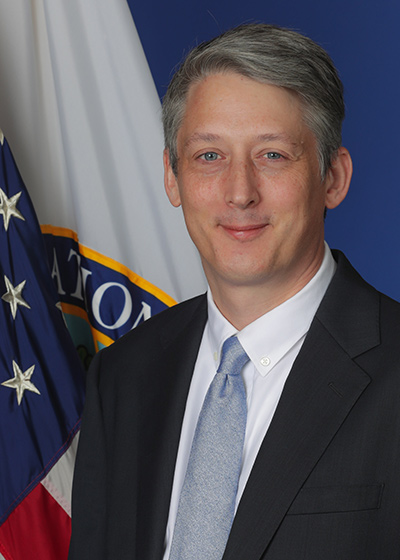
- Official portrait, 2021

United States Under Secretary of Education
- In office September 22, 2021 – January 20, 2025
- President: Joe Biden
- Preceded by: Ted Mitchell
- Succeeded by: Nicholas Kent

Personal details
- Born: James Richard Kvaal
- Education: Stanford University (BA); Harvard University (JD)

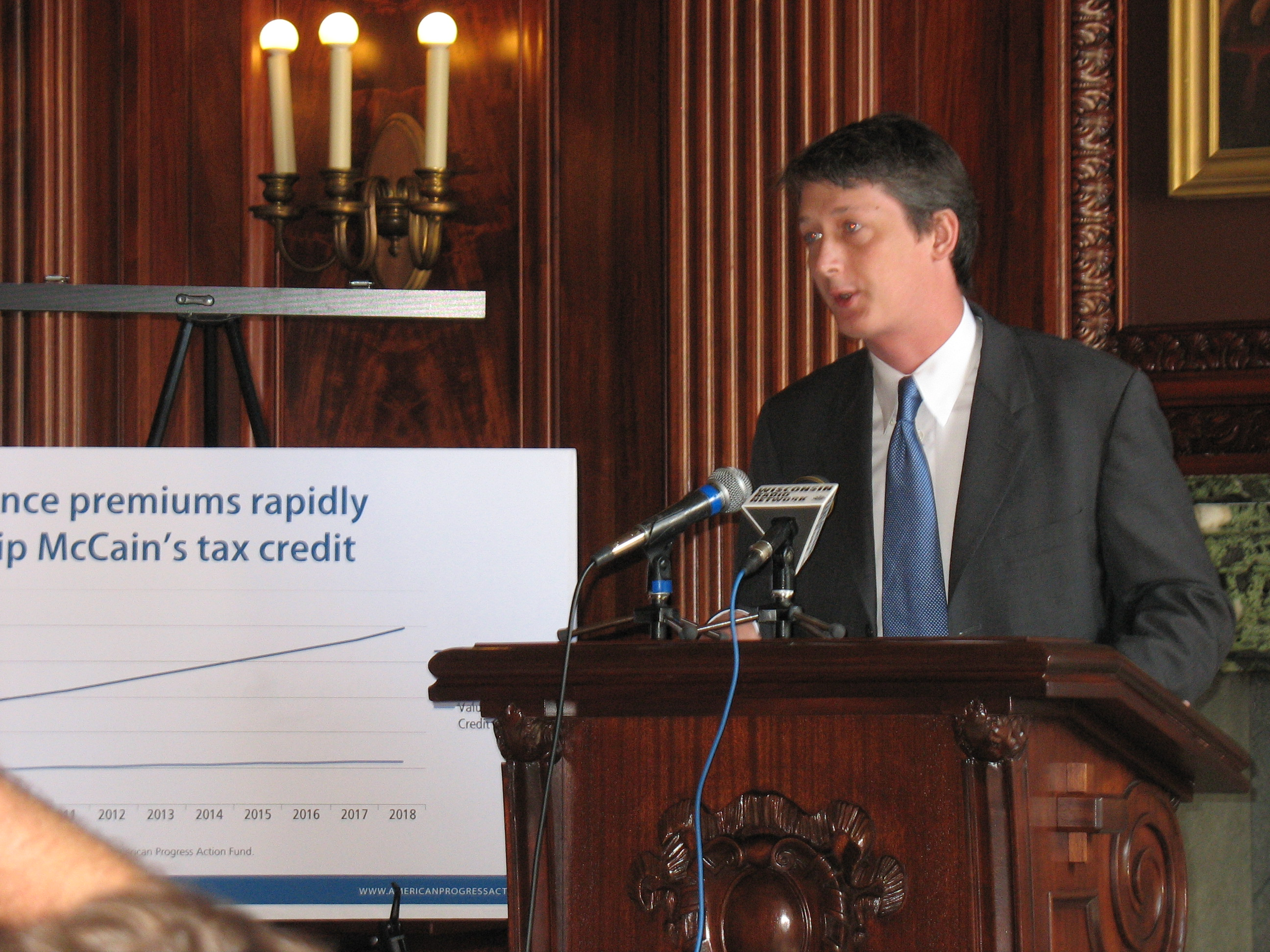
Kvaal speaking at a Center for American Progress Action Fund press conference during the 2008 United States presidential election

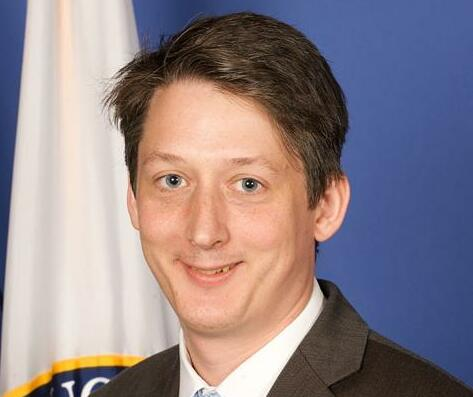
2010 government portrait of Kvaal

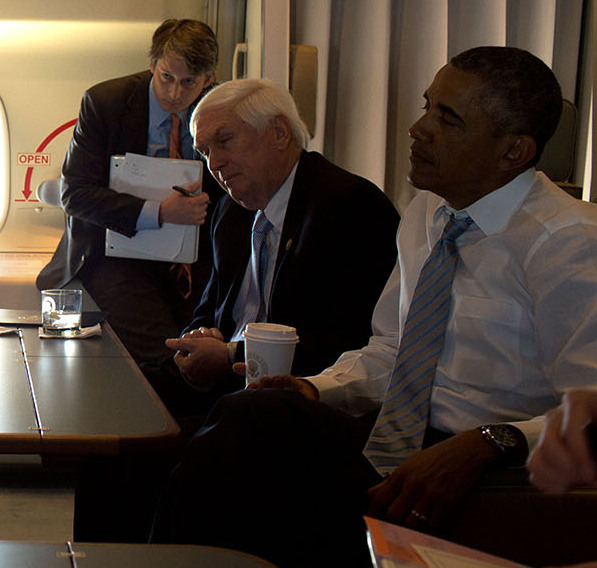
Kvaal (left) aboard Air Force One in 2015 with Congressman Jimmy Duncan (center) and President Barack Obama

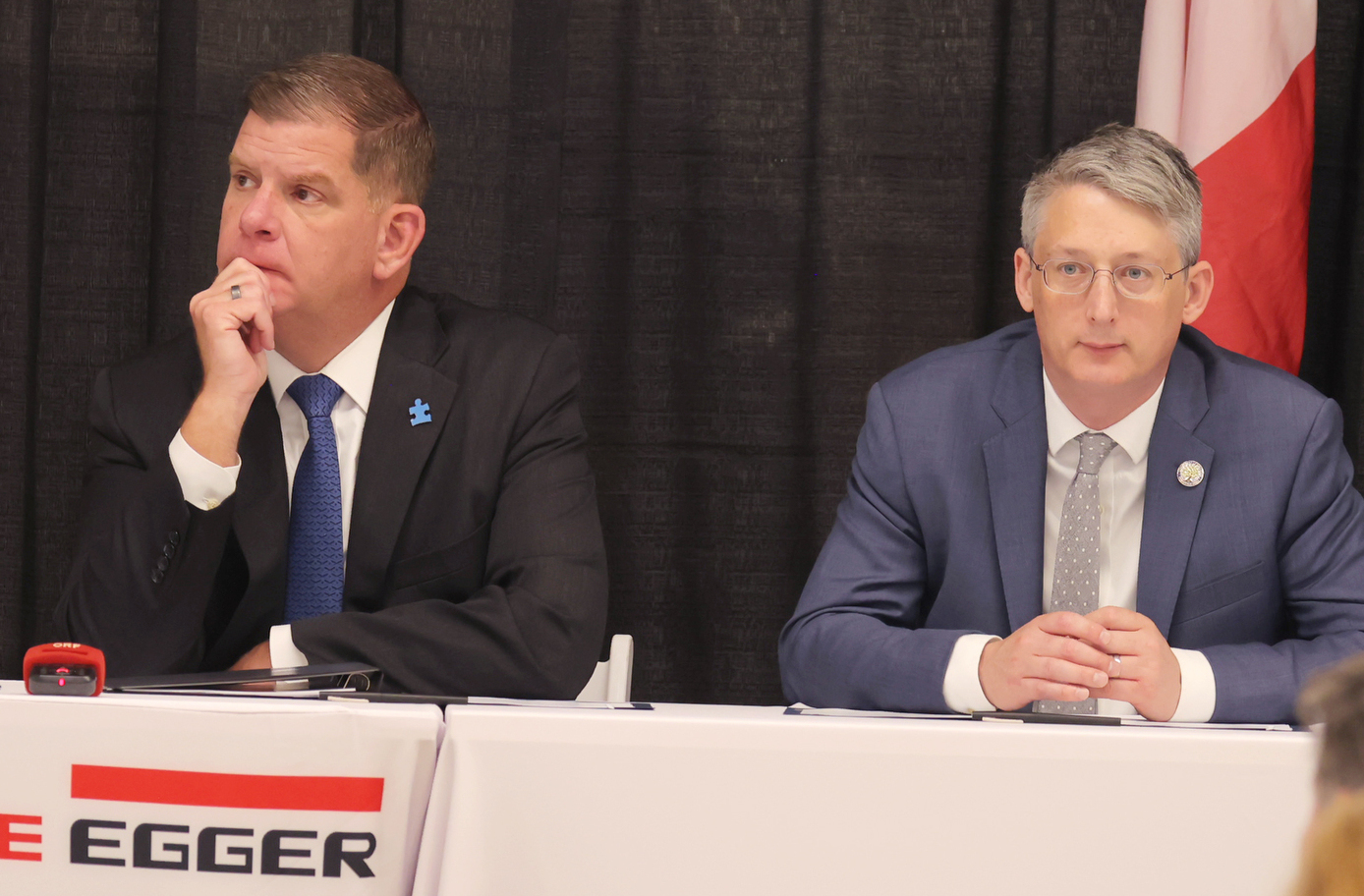
Kvaal (right) with Secretary of Labor Marty Walsh in 2022

James Richard Kvaal is an American attorney and education policy advisor who served as under secretary of education in the Biden administration from 2021 to 2025. Kvaal previously served in the United States Department of Education and White House Office during the Obama administration.

== Education ==
Kvaal earned a Bachelor of Arts degree in public policy from Stanford University in 1996 and a Juris Doctor from Harvard Law School in 2007.

== Career ==
Before law school, Kvaal was a policy adviser in the administration of President Bill Clinton.

=== Obama administration ===
During the first three years of the Obama administration, he was special assistant for economic policy and deputy undersecretary of education. After working for the Obama 2012 presidential campaign as policy director, he served as deputy policy director of the United States Domestic Policy Council in 2016. Kvaal was responsible for developing a federal college ratings system, which ultimately became the College Scorecard. Early in the administration, Kvaal worked to increase Pell Grants and access to financial aid for college and job training. Kvaal also worked to provide financial relief for students at for-profit institutions.

During the Obama administration, Kvaal worked to establish a plan for free community college, announced in 2015. Kvaal traveled the country to promote the plan and to encourage state and local governments to adopt their own versions.

=== TICAS ===
In 2017, he became president of the Institute for College Access and Success, where he continued working to hold colleges accountable and make student debt manageable.

=== Undersecretary of Education ===
On February 17, 2021, Kvaal was announced as the nominee to serve as under secretary of education in the Biden administration. At his confirmation hearing in April 2021, senators raised a number of topics, including student debt, tuition, college football, and oversight of for-profit colleges. Kvaal received bipartisan support from the United States Senate Committee on Health, Education, Labor and Pensions, but his confirmation vote on the Senate floor was delayed due to an objection from Senator Elizabeth Warren related to her concerns about student debt and the administration of federal student loans. She eventually withdrew the objection.

The Senate invoked cloture on Kvaal's nomination on September 13, 2021 in a 55-37 vote.

The Senate confirmed Kvaal's nomination on September 14, 2021 in a 58-37 vote.

=== Philanthropy ===
After leaving the office of the Under Secretary in January 2025, Kvaal was named to an executive role with the Andrew Carnegie Foundation.
