= Rod Paige =

American politician (1933–2025)

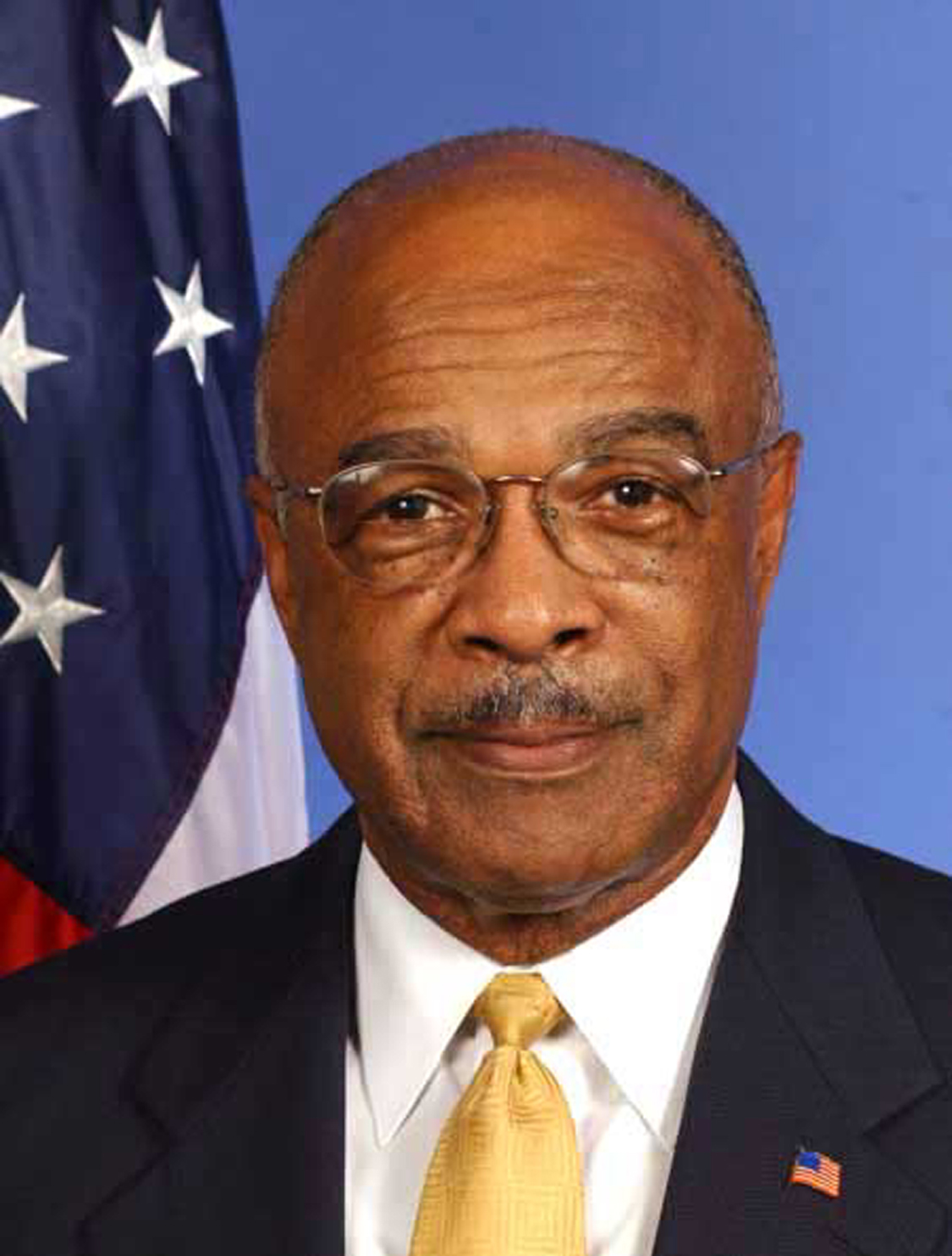
- Official portrait, c. 2004

7th United States Secretary of Education
- In office January 20, 2001 – January 20, 2005
- President: George W. Bush
- Deputy: William D. Hansen; Eugene W. Hickok
- Preceded by: Richard Riley
- Succeeded by: Margaret Spellings

Superintendent of the Houston Independent School District
- In office 1994–2001
- Preceded by: Yvonne Gonzales (acting)
- Succeeded by: Kaye Stripling (acting)

Personal details
- Born: Roderick Raynor Paige; June 17, 1933 Monticello, Mississippi, U.S.
- Died: December 9, 2025 (aged 92) Houston, Texas, U.S.
- Party: Republican
- Spouse(s): Gloria Crawford (m. 1956; div. 1982) Stephanie Nellons (m. 2009)
- Children: 2 (Note: One biological son and one step-daughter from Nellons)
- Education: Jackson State University (BA); Indiana University, Bloomington (MA, EdD)

Military service
- Allegiance: United States
- Branch: United States Navy
- Service years: 1955–1957
- Coaching career

Coaching career (HC unless noted)
- 1964–1968: Jackson State
- 1971–1975: Texas Southern

Administrative career (AD unless noted)
- 1971–1980: Texas Southern

Head coaching record
- Overall: 52–40–5

Roderick Raynor Paige Sr. (June 17, 1933 – December 9, 2025) was an American academic and politician who served as the 7th United States secretary of education from 2001 to 2005 during the George W. Bush administration. He was the first African American to serve as the secretary of education. His tenure as education secretary was noted for his involvement in the creation and passage of the No Child Left Behind Act in 2002.

Paige, who grew up in Mississippi, served as the head football coach for the Jackson State Tigers from 1964 to 1968 and Texas Southern Tigers from 1971 to 1975. He also served as a college dean for Texas Southern University and was the Superintendent of the Houston Independent School District from 1994 until 2001.

After leaving the Education Department in 2005, Paige served as interim president of Jackson State University from November 2016 to June 2017.

== Early life and education ==
Roderick Raynor Paige was born on June 17, 1933, in Monticello, Mississippi, as the son of public school educators. He earned a bachelor's degree from Jackson State University in Jackson, Mississippi. He earned a master's degree and a Doctor of Education degree in Physical Education from Indiana University Bloomington.

Paige served in the United States Navy from 1955 to 1957.

== Career ==
Paige taught health and physical education and coached at Hinds Agricultural High School and Utica Junior College (now Hinds Community College Utica Campus) in Mississippi, from 1957 to 1963. From 1964 to 1968, Paige served as head football coach at Jackson State University. At Jackson State, he recruited and coached Lem Barney who later played for the Detroit Lions and was inducted into the Pro Football Hall of Fame. From 1971 to 1975, Paige served as head football coach at Texas Southern University, and served as the university's athletic director from 1971 to 1980.

Paige first moved to Houston in the 1970s, settling in the Brentwood subdivision. He started a move to excise a dump from the edge of the community. The Texas Supreme Court eventually sided with the residents. Paige taught at Texas Southern University from 1980 to 1984 and became the Dean of the College of Education in 1984, where he served until 1994. Paige also established the university's Center for Excellence in Urban Education, a research facility that concentrates on issues related to instruction and management in urban school systems.

As a trustee and an officer of the Board of Education of the Houston Independent School District (HISD) from 1989 to 1994, Paige coauthored the board's 'A Declaration of Beliefs and Visions', a statement of purpose and goals for the school district that called for fundamental reform through decentralization, a focus on instruction, accountability at all levels, and development of a core curriculum. A Declaration of Beliefs and Visions was the catalyst that launched the ongoing, comprehensive restructuring of HISD. As an HISD trustee, Paige launched a municipal-style, accredited police department at HISD with police officers certified by the Texas Commission on Law Enforcement Officers Standards and Education. Paige's board of education began that effort to provide better school safety, and the HISD police department remains the only school district police department in the country to earn accreditation from the Commission on Accreditation for Law Enforcement Agencies.

Paige became the superintendent of schools of HISD in 1994. As superintendent, Paige created the Peer Examination, Evaluation, and Redesign (PEER) program, which solicits recommendations from business and community professionals for strengthening school support services and programs. He started a system of charter schools that have broad authority in decisions regarding staffing, textbooks, and materials. He saw to it that HISD paid teachers salaries competitive with those offered by other large Texas school districts. Paige made HISD the first school district in the state to institute performance contracts modeled on those in the private sector, whereby senior staff members' continued employment with HISD is based on their performance. He also introduced teacher incentive pay, which rewards teachers for raising test scores.

While he was superintendent, Paige led the district to enter into contracts with private schools to use them to teach some HISD students rather than placing those students into overcrowded public schools. Under Paige HISD contracted with three private schools that were certified by the Texas Education Agency to teach HISD students so their parents did not have to bus them to schools across the city.

Many touted the "Houston Miracle" accomplished under Paige where student test scores rose under his leadership. However, some schools underreported the number of drop-outs during his watch.

=== U.S. Secretary of Education ===
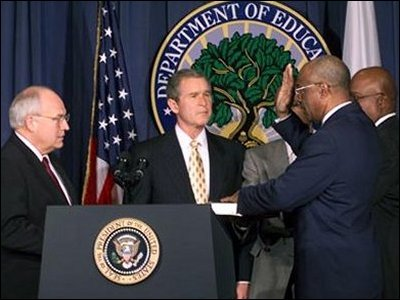
Paige being sworn in by Vice President Dick Cheney as Secretary of Education while President George W. Bush looks on, 2001

In January 2001, Paige was confirmed as the U.S. Secretary of Education by the U.S. Senate and was later sworn in to serve on President George W. Bush's cabinet. Paige was the first school superintendent to serve as Education secretary. He was also the department's first African American secretary.

Under Paige, the No Child Left Behind law that set new accountability standards nationwide was developed with Paige's help, and it was Paige's Department of Education that implemented the law. The Bush White House's development of the principles of No Child Left Behind drew in part on the successes of the Houston Independent School District under Paige. The department earned "clean" audits from Ernst and Young for three consecutive years. Prior to 2001, the department had achieved only one clean audit in its history, and that audit was by the Department's Office of Inspector General.

Paige was sitting with President Bush during his visit to an elementary school in Sarasota, Florida, when Bush received the news that a second plane had hit the World Trade Center in the September 11, 2001 attacks.

Paige proposed amendments to the regulations implementing Title IX of the Education Amendments of 1972 to provide more flexibility for educators to establish single-sex classes and schools at the elementary and secondary levels.

In 2003, the Education Department received its second clean financial audit in a row for that fiscal year.

In February 2004, Paige referred to the National Education Association, the nation's largest teachers union, as a "terrorist organization." He would apologize for his remarks a few days later. In July 2004, Paige criticized the leadership of the National Association for the Advancement of Colored People (NAACP) for saying "some black groups are fronts for white conservatives".

On November 15, 2004, Paige announced his resignation after overseeing the President's education agenda for four years. White House domestic policy adviser Margaret Spellings was nominated as his successor.

== Other activities ==
Paige served on review committees of the Texas Education Agency and the State Board of Education's Task Force on High School Education, and he chaired the Youth Employment Issues Subcommittee of the National Commission for Employment Policy of the U.S. Department of Labor.

Paige was a member of the National Association for the Advancement of Colored People (NAACP). He was also a member of the Houston Job Training Partnership Council, the Community Advisory Board of Texas Commerce Bank, the American Leadership Forum, and the board of directors of the Texas Business and Education Coalition.

Paige was also a member of Phi Beta Sigma fraternity, having been initiated into the Alpha Beta chapter on October 15, 1952. He later went on to serve as interim president of his alma mater, Jackson State University, from November 2016 to June 2017.

== Personal life and death ==
Paige was married to Gloria Crawford from 1956 until they divorced in 1982. They had one son: Roderick Jr. He then married Stephanie D. Nellons in 2009. Nellons had a daughter, Danielle, from a previous marriage, who would become Paige's step-daughter.

Paige died at his home in Houston on December 9, 2025, at the age of 92.

== Honors and awards ==
The Houston Independent School District renamed its James Bowie Elementary School after Paige, to become Roderick R Paige Elementary School. The Lawrence County School District in his hometown of Monticello, Mississippi, renamed its Monticello Junior High School as Rod Paige Middle School.

The University of Houston presented Paige with an honorary doctoral degree in 2000. Indiana University Bloomington awarded Paige an honorary Doctor of Humane Letters degree in 2017, in addition to a Distinguished Alumni Service Award in 2013.

== Head coaching record ==
| Year | Team | Overall | Conference | Standing | Bowl/playoffs |
|---|---|---|---|---|---|
Jackson State Tigers (Southwestern Athletic Conference) (1964–1968)
| 1964 | Jackson State | 6–4 | 4–3 | 3rd | |
| 1965 | Jackson State | 5–3–1 | 3–3–1 | T–4th | |
| 1966 | Jackson State | 5–3–1 | 3–3–1 | T–5th | |
| 1967 | Jackson State | 6–3 | 4–3 | T–3rd | |
| 1968 | Jackson State | 3–6 | 1–6 | 7th | |
| Jackson State: | | 25–19–2 | 15–18–2 | | |
Texas Southern Tigers (Southwestern Athletic Conference) (1971–1975)
| 1971 | Texas Southern | 7–2–1 | 3–2–1 | 4th | |
| 1972 | Texas Southern | 5–4–1 | 3–2–1 | 4th | |
| 1973 | Texas Southern | 5–5–1 | 2–3–1 | 5th | |
| 1974 | Texas Southern | 6–4 | 3–3 | T–4th | |
| 1975 | Texas Southern | 4–6 | 2–4 | 6th | |
| Texas Southern: | | 27–21–3 | 13–14–3 | | |
| Total: | | 52–40–5 | | | |

== See also ==
- History of the African Americans in Houston
- List of African-American United States Cabinet members

== Notes ==
Educational offices
| Preceded by Yvonne Gonzales; Acting | Superintendent of the Houston Independent School District; 1994–2001 | Succeeded by Kaye Stripling; Acting |
Political offices
| Preceded by Richard Riley | United States Secretary of Education; 2001–2005 | Succeeded by Margaret Spellings |
Academic offices
| Preceded by Carolyn Meyers | President of Jackson State University; Acting; 2016–2018 | Succeeded by William Bynum |
