= Robert Mendenhall =

Robert Winton Mendenhall
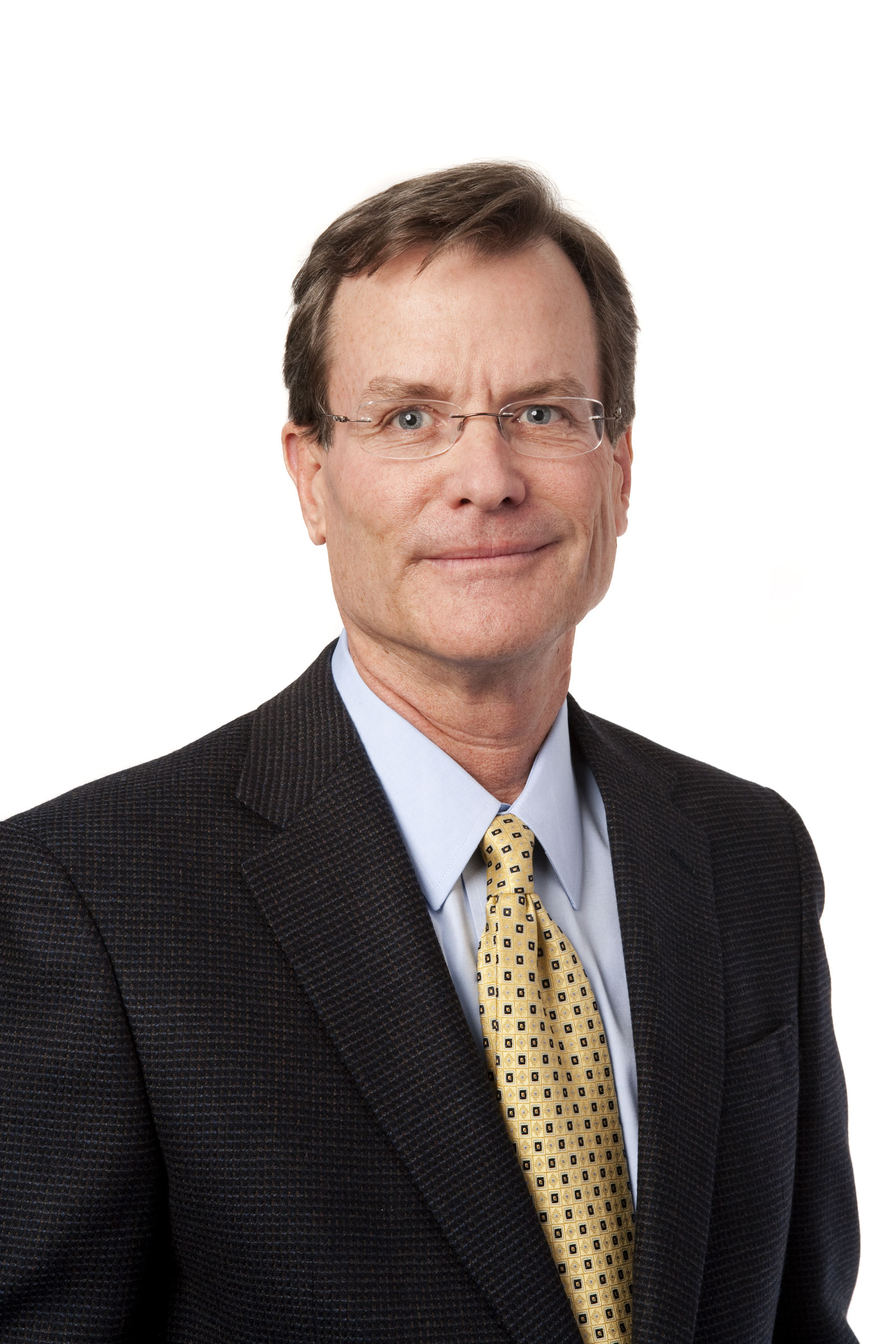

Personal details
- Born: November 18, 1954 (age 71)
- Spouse: Kathleen White
- Children: 7

Robert Winton Mendenhall (born November 18, 1954) is an American educational technologist best known as the president from 1999 to 2016 of Western Governors University (WGU).

== Family and church life ==
Mendenhall is a convert to The Church of Jesus Christ of Latter-day Saints. As a young man he served a two-year mission in the Mexico Veracruz mission. He has served in multiple church leadership roles including bishop and stake president. He is married to Kathleen White and they have 7 children and 25 grandchildren.

== Presidency of Western Governors University ==
Mendenhall became president of Western Governors University in 1999, the same year the university enrolled its first students. WGU is a private, non-profit, online university offering competency-based undergraduate and graduate degrees in Business, Teacher Education, Information Technology, and Health Professions, including Nursing. It was founded in 1997 by 19 western state governors, organized through the Western Governors Association, with the mission to improve the quality and expand access to post-secondary educational opportunities. Under Mendenhall's leadership, WGU grew to a national university with more than 84,000 students and 91,100 graduates.

In April 2016, Mendenhall stepped down as president and became WGU's first President Emeritus. In March 2016, WGU's Board of Trustees announced Scott D. Pulsipher as the new president.

In addition to his seventeen years as president, Mendenhall also served on the WGU Board of Trustees.

Discussing the university, Mendenhall said, "WGU was specifically created as a new model for higher education, incorporating the use of technology to expand access and reduce costs, while creating competency-based degree programs to improve accountability for learning."

== Experience and education ==
Mendenhall has over 35 years of experience delivering technology-based education. Prior to joining WGU, he was general manager of IBM's K-12 education division. He also served as executive vice president for Jostens Learning Corporation.

From 1980 to 1992, he was a founder, president, and CEO (from 1987) of Wicat Systems, Inc., a publicly traded company which was a leader in providing computer-based curriculum, instructional management and testing to schools, and technology-based training to government and industry.

Mendenhall was a founding Board member of the Presidents' Forum, a trustee of the Committee for Economic Development, and also served on the NGA/ASTD Commission on Technology & Adult Learning, on IBM’s Education Advisory Council, on the National Forum on 21st Century Skills Education Advisory Board, and on the Technology Working Group for the California Postsecondary Education Commission. Mendenhall is a former member of the Board of the Department of Business and Economic Development for the State of Utah.

Mendenhall received a bachelor's degree in university studies and a doctorate in instructional psychology and technology from Brigham Young University. On July 15, 2017, Mendenhall was awarded an honorary Doctorate of Humane Letters by Western Governors University.

== Commission on the Future of Higher Education ==
Mendenhall served on the Commission on the Future of Higher Education at the request of U.S. Secretary of Education Margaret Spellings. In 2006, the commission issued a report titled "A Test for Leadership: Charting the Future of U.S. Higher Education." The report was critical of many aspects of higher education in the U.S. and offered suggestions on how to improve the system. Commenting in the media, Mendenhall stated: "I don't think it's about blame. [Our] report was more negative than it needs to be about the academy, but not as alarming as it needs to be in shining a light on the challenges in American higher education."

On December 5, 2011, Mendenhall was one of several university presidents, chancellors, and higher education representatives invited to the White House by President Obama to discuss the cost of college and improving education. In 2012, Mendenhall testified to the United States Senate Higher Education Committee regarding innovations in college affordability.

== Awards and recognition ==
In 2010, Mendenhall was honored with the Harold W. McGraw Jr. Prize in Education for creating educational ideas that work and scaling them up to improve student achievement. Utah Business Magazine named him 2010 CEO of the Year; the U.S. Distance Learning Association's (USDLA) gave him its Award for Outstanding Leadership by an Individual in the Field of Distance Learning. In 2011, Ernst & Young granted Mendenhall the Utah regional award in its Entrepreneur of the Year program in the Technology and Education category.

For his work in leading and developing WGU, Mendenhall was selected by the Higher Education Policy Institute and Council for Adult and Experiential Learning to receive the 2012 Virginia B. Smith Innovative Leadership Award.

In 2016 he was the recipient of the Champions of E-Learning Award - Heavy Lifter Award from Presidents’ Forum.
