= Collette Chilton =

American businesswoman

- Education: University of California, Berkeley; Dartmouth’s Amos Tuck School of Business Administration
- Occupations: Chief Investment Officer, Williams College Investment Office
- Known for: Business

Collette Chilton is an American businesswoman and the current Chief Investment Officer of the Williams College Investment Office. Previously, she was the Chief Investment Officer and President of Lucent Asset Management Corporation.

== Early life ==
Chilton grew up in the San Francisco Bay Area. Chilton attended the University of California, Berkeley, and graduated with a degree in political economy of natural resources in 1981. She graduated from Dartmouth’s Amos Tuck School of Business Administration in 1986.

== Career ==
Before working at the Williams College Investment Office, Chilton was Chief Investment Officer and President of Lucent Asset Management Corporation. At Lucent, Chilton managed over $40 billion in funds. Before Lucent, Chilton served as Chief Investment Officer of both the Massachusetts State Teachers’ and Employees’ Retirement Systems Trust and the Pension Reserves Investment Management Board. Before this, Chilton worked for both Citicorp Investment Bank and First National Bank of Boston.

As Chief Investment Officer, Chilton oversees the process of selecting managers for each asset class in the Williams endowment portfolio. The endowment has grown substantially in the last 10 years under Chilton, except for during the 2008 financial crisis and recovery: the fund returned, for example, -18.4% in 2009. Last year, the portfolio returned 9.9% with an objective of 5%. In the last 3 years, the portfolio has returned 14.1% with an objective of 6.3%.

Pam Peedin, Dartmouth's Chief Investment Officer, called Chilton "one of the real leaders in our field" in an interview with the Tuck School of Business.

== Personal life ==
Chilton is currently chair of the board of The Investment Fund for Foundations Advisory Services and on the board of the Center for Private Equity and Entrepreneurship at Tuck. She is also on the investment committees of the Edna McConnell Clark Foundation and Dartmouth College. Previously, Chilton served on the board of governors of NASDAQ OMX BX.

Chilton lives in Boston with her husband, Court Chilton, who is a senior lecturer at MIT's Sloan School of Management.
