= Jim Shelton =

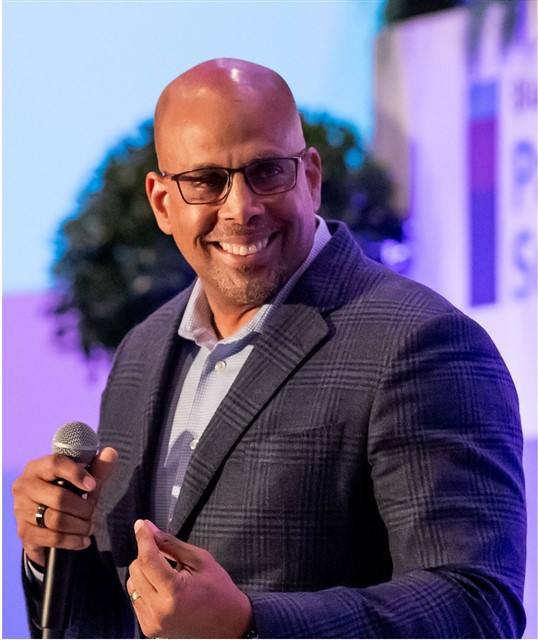

United States Deputy Secretary of Education
- In office May 2013 – January 4, 2015
- President: Barack Obama
- Preceded by: Anthony W. Miller
- Succeeded by: Mick Zais

Personal details
- Party: Democratic
- Education: Morehouse College (BS); Stanford University (MEd, MBA)

James H. Shelton III is the chief executive officer of Blue Meridian Partners. He was previously the Deputy Secretary of the United States Department of Education, and the head of the Chan Zuckerberg Initiative's Education division.

Shelton also serves on the board of directors for Duolingo.

== Early life and education ==
Shelton holds a bachelor's degree in computer science from Morehouse College, as well as master's degrees in business administration and education from Stanford University.

== Career ==
Earlier in his career, Shelton spent four years in Atlanta with McKinsey & Company. He left as a senior manager to join Knowledge Universe, Inc., where he launched, acquired, and operated education-related businesses. Shelton also co-founded LearnNow, a school management company later acquired by Edison Schools, and subsequently served as the East Coast lead for venture philanthropy fund New Schools.

Shelton also served as program director for education at the Bill & Melinda Gates Foundation, where he managed portfolios ranging from $2 to $3 billion in non-profit investments, targeting increased high school and college graduation rates.

Shelton joined the Department of Education in March 2009, to lead its office of innovation and improvement. In that position, he a portfolio that included most of the Department's competitive programs, such as the Investing in Innovation Fund (i3), Promise Neighborhoods, and others focused on teacher and leader quality, school choice, and learning technology. He later served as Deputy Secretary of Education from May 2013 to December 2014 under Arne Duncan.

Shelton was also the founding executive director of My Brother's Keeper Challenge. In 2015, Shelton joined education company 2U as president and chief impact officer. He then joined the Chan Zuckerberg Initiative, serving as president of its education division from 2016 to 2018.Shelton subsequently founded the advisory firm Amandla Enterprises, and was named to Duolingo's board of directors in October 2020.

Shelton joined nonprofit organization Blue Meridian Partners in 2020, as chief investment and impact officer. In March 2025, he later was appointed the role as the organization's president and chief executive officer.

== Personal life ==
Shelton currently resides in his hometown, Washington, D.C., with his wife Sonia and their two sons.

Government offices
Preceded by Anthony W. Miller	United States Deputy Secretary of Education; 2013–2015	Succeeded by Mick Zais
