= Williams College Investment Office =

- Industry: Investment management
- Founded: 2006
- Headquarters: Boston, Massachusetts, U.S.
- Key people: Abigail Wattley
- AUM: ▲US $4.23 billion (2021)
- Parent: Williams College
- Website: investment.williams.edu

The Williams College Investment Office is the subsidiary office of Williams College responsible for managing the College's endowment of over US $4.2 billion. The Office is located in Boston, Massachusetts. Its Chief Investment Officer is Abigail Wattley.

== Founding ==
In 2006, Williams College established the Investment Office to manage the endowment. In the early 2000s, the endowment had exceeded US $1 billion and the College decided more complex investment management was required to continue to grow the fund. The College hired Collette Chilton as Chief Investment Officer and set up an office in Boston, Massachusetts.

== Organization and structure ==
The Investment Office has a staff of eleven people who directly oversee the management of the College's portfolio. Advising the staff are two Advisory Committees, made up of Williams alumni or parents with financial expertise. Overseeing all is the Investment Committee, consisting of eight active members, who is finally responsible for the Investment Pool.

On the staff level, the Chief Investment Officer is Abigail Wattley, the successor of Collette Chilton, who retired in 2023. The Co-Chairs of the Marketable Assets Advisory Committee are May NG and Noriko Honda Chen. The Co-Chairs of the Non-Marketable Assets Advisory Committee are Mathew Harris and Jonathan Sokoloff. The Chair of the Investment Committee is Nathan Sleeper.

== Investment strategy ==
The Investment Office does not directly invest in any stocks. Rather, the staff hires managers to invest the different assets in the portfolio. There are ten asset classes: global long equity, global long/short equity, absolute return, venture capital, buyouts, real assets, real estate, investment grade fixed income, non-investment grade fixed income, and cash. The Office has a long-term return objective of 5% plus inflation. Overall, the Investment Office had a rate of return of 11.7% in fiscal year 2025, and an overall annual return of 9.4% for the last ten years.
