= Eugene W. Hickok =

American politician (born 1951)

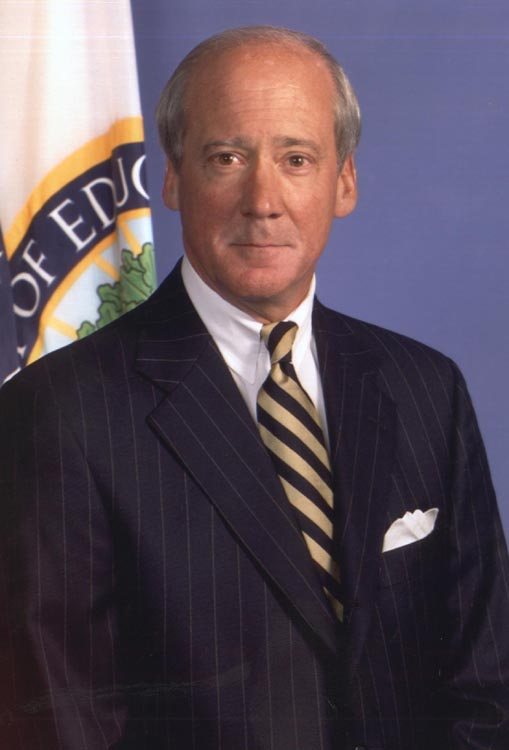

United States Deputy Secretary of Education
- In office October 5, 2003 – January 20, 2005; Acting: October 5, 2003 – November 3, 2003
- President: George W. Bush
- Preceded by: William D. Hansen
- Succeeded by: Raymond Simon

14th Pennsylvania Secretary of Education
- In office March 20, 1995 – March 20, 2001
- Governor: Tom Ridge
- Preceded by: Jane Carroll (acting)
- Succeeded by: Charles B. Zogby (acting)

Personal details
- Born: Eugene Welch Hickok Denver, Colorado
- Party: Republican
- Education: Hampden–Sydney College (BA); University of Virginia (MA, PhD)
- Profession: academic, lawyer, lobbyist

Eugene W. Hickok (born 1951, Denver, Colorado) is a former United States Deputy Secretary of Education, serving from 2003 to 2005 under President George W. Bush, and a former Secretary of the Pennsylvania Department of Education, serving from 1995 to 2001 under Pennsylvania Governor Tom Ridge. He is an adjunct professor at the University of Richmond.

== Education ==
Hickok is a 1972 graduate of Hampden–Sydney College. He also received a Master of Public Administration and Ph.D. from the University of Virginia.

== Career ==
=== Early career ===
For over 15 years, Hickok worked at Dickinson College where he held various roles as professor of political science, director of the college's Clarke Center for the Interdisciplinary Study of Contemporary Issues, and an adjunct professor at the Dickinson School of Law.

He also worked as an associate director of the political science department at Mississippi State University, and the director of financial aid for Hampden–Sydney College.

From 1986 to 1987, he served as a special assistant in the Office of Legal Counsel at the United States Department of Justice.

From 1990 to 1991, he served as a resident adjunct scholar at The Heritage Foundation.

=== Public service ===
From 1992 to 1995, Hickok was elected to and served as a member of the Carlisle Area School District Board of Directors.

In 1995, he was appointed by Pennsylvania Governor Tom Ridge as Secretary of the Pennsylvania Department of Education.

President George W. Bush nominated Hickok as Under Secretary of Education on March 30, 2001, and he was confirmed by the U.S. Senate on July 10, 2001. He later served as Acting Deputy Secretary of Education and was officially nominated and recess appointed as United States Deputy Secretary of Education by Bush in 2004, resigning later that year. In his position as Deputy Secretary of Education, Hickok managed the development and execution of the President's educational priorities, including the No Child Left Behind Act. In 2007, he agreed to pay a $50,000 civil settlement relating to a conflict-of-interest matter concerning stock he owned while Deputy Secretary of Education.

=== Post-Public Service career ===
In July 2005, Hickok was hired by Washington, DC–based government affairs firm Dutko Worldwide to head their education practice.

Hickok currently teaches as an adjunct professor of Constitutional Politics at the University of Richmond.

He currently serves on the Board of Trustees of Hampden-Sydney College and has previously served on Board of Directors at Montpelier, a historic house museum located at the plantation owned by President James Madison.

Political offices
| Preceded by William D. Hansen | United States Deputy Secretary of Education; 2003–2005 | Succeeded by Raymond Simon |
| Preceded by Jane Carroll (acting) | Pennsylvania Secretary of Education; 1995–2001 | Succeeded by Charles B. Zogby (acting) |
