= Nicholas Kent =

American public official

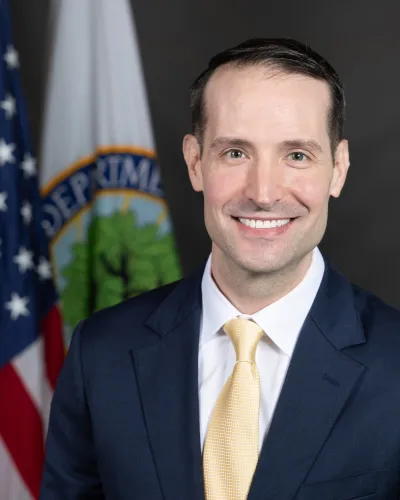
- Official portrait, 2025

United States Deputy Secretary of Education
- Acting
- Assumed office February 5, 2026
- President: Donald Trump
- Preceded by: Richard Smith (acting)

15th Under Secretary of Education
- Incumbent
- Assumed office August 4, 2025
- President: Donald Trump
- Preceded by: James Kvaal

Personal details
- Party: Republican
- Education: West Virginia Wesleyan College (BA); George Washington University (MA)

Nicholas Kent is an American public official who has served as the under secretary of education within the United States Department of Education since 2025. A member of the Republican Party, he has served as the acting deputy secretary of education since 2026.

== Early life and education ==
Kent earned his bachelor's degree from West Virginia Wesleyan College, a Methodist school, and his master's from George Washington University. He is a first-generation college student and a Pell Grant recipient.

== Career ==
From 2020 to 2021, Kent was a registered lobbyist for private higher education institutions and organizations, including for-profit colleges. From 2023 to 2025, Kent served as Virginia's Deputy Secretary of Education.

In February 2025, President Donald Trump nominated Kent to be under secretary of education. On August 1, 2025, Kent was confirmed by the U.S. Senate on a party-line vote.

Political offices
Preceded by Richard Smith; Acting	United States Deputy Secretary of Education; Acting; 2026–present	Incumbent
