= Raymond Simon =

American educator

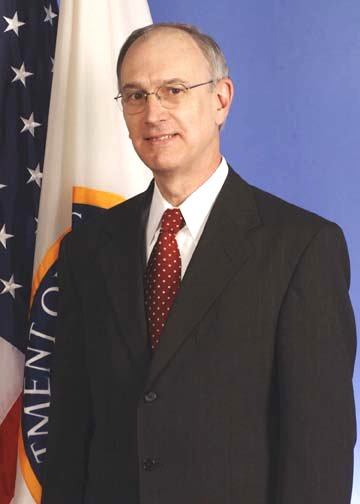

United States Deputy Secretary of Education
- In office May 26, 2005 – January 20, 2009
- President: George W. Bush
- Preceded by: Eugene W. Hickok
- Succeeded by: Anthony Wilder Miller

Personal details
- Born: Raymond Joseph Simon Conway, Arkansas
- Party: Independent
- Education: University of Central Arkansas; University of Arkansas
- Profession: educator, civil servant

Raymond Joseph Simon is an American educator and the former United States Deputy Secretary of Education. Simon led the Office of the Deputy Secretary (ODS) which served the administration of Secretary of Education Margaret Spellings. Simon was nominated by U.S. President George W. Bush and confirmed by the United States Senate on May 26, 2005. He was primarily focused on the 2001 No Child Left Behind Act that aims at reforming primary and secondary education. Simon had previously served as the Assistant Secretary for Elementary and Secondary Education, which serves as the top official within the Office of Elementary and Secondary Education.

Simon was the Chief State School Officer for Arkansas for six years—a position he held until his initial appointment by President G.W. Bush. He also served as superintendent of the Conway (Arkansas) School District from 1991 to 1997.

Raymond & Phyllis Simon Intermediate School was named for the Simons and is located in Conway, Arkansas.

== Early life and education ==
A native of Conway, Arkansas, Simon has been involved in Arkansas education since 1966, when he began his career as a mathematics teacher at North Little Rock High School. While at North Little Rock, he was also Director of School Food Services and Director of Computer Services until moving back to Conway to serve as Assistant Superintendent for Finance. In addition, he has been an adjunct professor for both educational technology and school finance at the undergraduate and graduate levels.

He received a bachelor's and master's degree in mathematics from the University of Central Arkansas, and holds an educational specialist degree in school administration from the University of Arkansas.

== Personal life ==
Simon and his wife, Phyllis, have one married daughter, Sandy, and two grandchildren, Alex and Ana.

Political offices
Preceded by Eugene W. Hickok	United States Deputy Secretary of Education; 2005-2009	Succeeded by Anthony Wilder Miller
