= Bipartisan Policy Center =

American think tank

- Abbreviation: BPC
- Formation: 2007; 19 years ago
- Type: Public policy think tank, 501(c)(3)
- Headquarters: Washington, D.C., U.S.
- Location: 1225 I St. NW, Washington, D.C., U.S.
- CEO: Margaret Spellings
- Key people: Roy Blunt, Val Demings, Olympia Snowe
- Affiliations: BPC Action, 501(c)(4)
- Revenue: $31,165,990 (2023)
- Expenses: $36,412,895 (2023)
- Website: bipartisanpolicy.org

The Bipartisan Policy Center (BPC) is a Washington, D.C.–based think tank that promotes bipartisanship in United States politics. Founded in 2007, the organization conducts research and convenes discussions on issues including health, energy, national security, and the economy. The organization also aims to combine ideas from both the Republican and Democratic parties to address U.S. policy challenges. In the 2023 fiscal year, BPC reported revenue of US$31.2 million and expenses of US$36.4 million.

== History ==
BPC was founded as a non-profit organization in 2007 by former Senate majority leaders Howard Baker, Tom Daschle, Bob Dole, and George J. Mitchell. BPC formally launched in March 2007, though the organization's roots trace back to 2002, when the National Commission on Energy Policy (NCEP), predecessor to BPC's current Energy Project, was founded.

In November 2010, BPC's "Debt Reduction Task Force" released its report, Restoring America's Future, in an effort to influence the debate over the national debt.

In April 2023, former United States Secretary of Housing and Urban Development, Henry Cisneros, was named chair of the BPC's board of directors.

In June 2023, the center announced that former U.S. Secretary of Education, Margaret Spellings (2005 to 2009), would succeed Jason Grumet as the center's CEO.

In 2024, former U.S. Senator Roy Blunt and former Representative Val Demings were noted as serving as Executive Fellows with the Bipartisan Policy Center.

== Funding ==
In 2013, the Edmond & Lily Safra Center for Ethics at Harvard University reported that the Bipartisan Policy Center advanced the interests of its funders, including corporations and industry associations who provide operational support and philanthropies that fund much of the center's programmatic work.

On March 19, 2024, the Bipartisan Policy Center announced the launch of a project "with financial backing from Google" that would educate legislators on the basics of artificial intelligence.

In April 2025, in testimony before a House subcommittee, Nvidia was cited as a funder of a Bipartisan Policy Center energy report: "A February 2025 report commissioned by Nvidia for the Bipartisan Policy Center urges policymakers to pump the brakes on the panic over future data center demand."

== Political action committee ==
BPC partners with a political action committee called BPC Action. BPC Action is "committed to seeing bipartisan policy solutions enacted into law", and "[works] closely with [its] 501(c)(3) partner, the Bipartisan Policy Center, to advance smart policies through the legislative process". BPC Action is a separate, 501(c)(4) nonprofit organization.
