= Jim Steyer =

American attorney (born 1956)

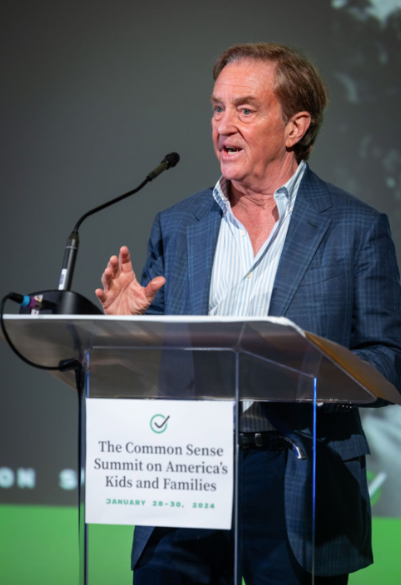
- Steyer in 2024
- Born: James Pearson Steyer; 1956 (age 69–70); New York City, U.S.
- Education: Stanford University (BA, JD)
- Years active: 1988
- Political party: Democratic
- Spouse: Liz Butler
- Children: 4
- Relatives: Tom Steyer (brother)

James Pearson Steyer (/ˈstaɪ.ər/; born 1956) is an American civil rights attorney, professor, and author. He is the founder and CEO of Common Sense Media, a nonprofit organization that "provides education and advocacy to families to promote safe technology and media for children."

== Early life and education ==
Steyer was born in New York City in 1956. His mother, Marnie (née Fahr), was a remedial reading teacher at the Brooklyn House of Detention, and his father, Roy Henry Steyer, was a partner in the New York law firm of Sullivan & Cromwell. His father was Jewish and his mother Episcopalian. He has two brothers: Hume Steyer and Tom Steyer. Steyer was highly influenced by his mother, who would sometimes bring him to class as her teaching assistant. In an article in the Los Angeles Times, Steyer's college friend, Mike Tollin, said "[Jim's] whole focus on kids comes from his close relationship with his mother…She was the kind of woman who would sit you down, ask you how things were, and you felt like you needed to tell her the truth."

Steyer graduated early from Phillips Exeter Academy in New Hampshire and worked with his mother teaching remedial reading at a public school in Harlem. Steyer later graduated Phi Beta Kappa from Stanford University where he was awarded the Lindsey Peters Award for Outstanding Work in American Government. After two years of community development work in Asia, he attended Stanford Law School and graduated in 1983.

During law school, Steyer was part of a group that founded the East Palo Alto Community Law Project, a non-profit legal services center for low-income families in East Palo Alto, California. After Stanford, he became a law clerk for Justice Allen Broussard of the California Supreme Court. He then served as a civil rights attorney for the NAACP Legal Defense Fund. There, he helped spearhead the Poverty and Justice Program, which focused on developing national legal and legislative strategies on behalf of disadvantaged African Americans.

== Career ==
Steyer has been teaching courses as an adjunct professor at Stanford University in political science, education, civil rights and civil liberties since the late 1980s. He has also authored three books: The Other Parent: The Inside Story of the Media's Effect on our Children in 2002, which focuses on the effects certain media and government regulators have on children, Talking Back to Facebook: The Common Sense Guide to Raising Kids in the Digital Age in 2012, and Which Side of History: How Technology Is Reshaping Democracy & Our Lives in 2021. His former students include New Jersey Senator Cory Booker, former National Security Adviser Susan Rice, and Chelsea Clinton, who he raved was such a "star student" that he hired her as a teaching assistant and research aide.

Steyer founded his first child advocacy venture, Children Now, in 1988. Children Now was one of the main lobbying groups that fought for the three-hour-a-week educational children's programming quota which eventually became law. The group also became well known for publishing a "report card" on California's children. This report card helped to shed light on important statistics. One of the red flags the report card raised was that one-fifth of California children lacked health insurance and only half were immunized.

Shortly after starting Children Now, Steyer noticed a serious need for high-quality educational TV programs for kids. In response he started JP Kids in 1996, a for-profit company that produced such shows as The Famous Jett Jackson, which aired on the Disney Channel. Steyer served as the company's Chairman and CEO. Under Steyer's guidance, the company used various platforms to broadcast more educational and entertaining content. JP Kids also provided an online outlet for teens to share opinions, explore alternative points of views and discuss political and environmental topics.

Steyer was awarded Stanford's highest teaching honor, the Walter J. Gores Award for Excellence in Teaching, which is awarded annually to Stanford faculty, staff and teaching assistants, in 2010. Stanford students also voted for him to be Class Day speaker during Stanford's graduation exercises. In 2011, the New York Times reported that Steyer was helping build the Center for the Next Generation, a nonprofit that aims to influence public policy debates focused on national children's and energy issues.

When Google announced in January 2012 that it would be compiling data about users from across its many sites, Steyer was quoted as saying that "Even if the company believes that tracking users across all platforms improves their services, consumers should still have the option to opt out — especially the kids and teens who are avid users of YouTube, Gmail and Google Search." In 2012, the Department of Education and the FCC recruited Steyer as the chairman of the Leading Education by Advancing Digital (LEAD) Commission, which enhances digital devices and curriculums in schools. Steyer was also a partner with Hillary Clinton on the Too Small to Fail initiative.

In June 2016, Steyer was included on Tech & Learning's 2016 List of the Most Influential People in Edtech. That same year, Steyer launched the Common Sense Kids campaign through Common Sense Media creating "a mass army for kids" by focusing on children's issues in the political field.

In 2025, he was listed as one of Politico’s “Top 20 most influential players in California tech”.

Steyer currently leads a Stanford course lecture, Which Side of History? How Democracy, Technology, and Our Lives Are Being Reshaped, featuring guest speakers such as Condoleezza Rice, Thomas Friedman, Jim Mattis, Nicholas Kristof, and Reid Hoffman.

=== Future of Tech Commission ===
Steyer launched the Future of Tech Commission with former Massachusetts Governor Deval Patrick and former Education Secretary Margaret Spellings as co-chairs, in April 2021. The commission compiled solutions for a comprehensive tech policy agenda on topics such as privacy, antitrust, digital equity, content moderation, and platform accountability.

== Common Sense Media ==
Founded in 2003, Steyer's nonprofit organization, Common Sense Media, focuses on the effects that media and technology have on young users. Steyer describes the group as "nutritional labeling of media". The leading national media advocacy group is financed by donations from foundations and individuals and fees from media partners. Common Sense Media distributes its content to more than 100 million US homes via partnerships with Comcast, Time Warner Cable, DIRECTV, NBC Universal, Netflix, Best Buy, Google, Yahoo!, AOL, Huffington Post, Fandango, Trend Micro, Verizon Foundation, Nickelodeon, and more. Common Sense Media’s ratings, research, and resources reach more than 150 million families and 1.4 million educators every year.

During a U.S. House of Representatives hearing in December 2021, Steyer claimed that Common Sense Media had 1.2 million registered teacher members. Their education programs focus on digital literacy and citizenship for students & parents and are in use in more than 90,000 schools across the U.S. Common Sense Media played a major role in the passage of a 2005 California law restricting the sale of violent video games, which was later struck down by the U.S. Supreme Court.

In March 2012, the feature length documentary Bully was released into AMC Theatres with a "Pause 13+" rating designated by Common Sense Media. The film had previously been rated R by the MPAA. Under the new rating, AMC theaters allowed entrance to viewers under 17 provided they had a signed permission slip.

In 2023, Steyer was a speaker at SXSW, representing Common Sense Media in the panel discussion How Teens Really Feel About Social Media. He was also a featured speaker at the 2023 Aspen Ideas Festival.

In January 2024, the first national annual children's Common Sense Summit on America's Kids and Families was held, featuring speakers such as Vivek Murthy, Hillary Clinton, and Sam Altman.

In early 2026, Common Sense Media launched its Youth AI Safety Institute, an independent global testing and research institute that evaluates the risk AI tools may pose to children, teens, and education.

== Privacy ==
In 2014, Steyer supported California's "Eraser Bill", which lets California children under 18 remove their postings from social media websites. The same year, Steyer called the passage of California Senate Bill 1177 "a big win for kids". The bill prohibits the sale and disclosure of schools' online student data. The bill also forbids targeted ads based on school information and the creation of student profiles when not used for education purposes.

In 2016, Steyer led Common Sense to launch Common Sense Legislative Ratings in an effort to publicize legislative bills that would help children and expose bills that could harm them. Common Sense Media supported the U.S. Department of Commerce's creation of an "online privacy policy", which would include a "Privacy Bill of Rights" and would make clear which types of personal information companies are allowed to keep on clients.

Steyer has also called for updates to the Children's Online Privacy Protection Act (COPPA), calling the time of the act's creation "the stone age of digital media" and pointing out the lack at the time of platforms such as Google, YouTube, Facebook, and Twitter.

In 2018 Steyer wrote in favor of sweeping privacy legislation, similar to the European Union's GDPR (2018), writing in the San Francisco Chronicle: "California families also deserve the right to informed consent when it comes to their personal information."

Common Sense and Steyer sponsored the California Consumer Privacy Act of 2018 which guarantees new data privacy rights for the state's consumers, with extra protections for kids under 16. The legislation, AB 375, took effect in 2020. They also endorsed the 2020 California Proposition 24, the Consumer Personal Law and Agency Initiative.

Also in 2018 Steyer joined with former Google employee Tristan Harris and Facebook investor Roger McNamee on the "Truth About Tech" campaign.

In 2018, Steyer was included in an article by The Wall Street Journal called "The New Tech Avengers", "an unlikely triumvirate of Silicon Valley insiders [...] holding the tech industry accountable on privacy and addiction."

Steyer sponsored the 2022 California Age-Appropriate Design Code Act, which is designed to force digital platforms to prioritize the safety and privacy of minors. He also sponsored the 2025 Social Media Warning Law, which takes effect in California on January 1, 2027; the law requires social media platforms to display health warnings for minors, particularly risks that are defined as being “addictive”.

== Writing ==
Steyer is the author of The Other Parent: The Inside Story of the Media's Effect on Our Children. According to Stanford Magazine, the book "paints a frightening picture of greedy media companies, indifferent government regulators and parents too overwhelmed to pay attention." He has served on numerous non-profit boards including Children Now, the National Parenting Association and the San Francisco Free Clinic.

In 2012, Steyer released Talking Back to Facebook, a book that deals with the presence of digital media in the lives of children. The book, with a foreword written by Chelsea Clinton, advocates for larger parental involvement in children's technological activities. Talking Back to Facebook outlines strategies for safeguarding against a potentially dangerous digital world. During a May 2012 segment of NPR's Fresh Air with Terry Gross, Steyer noted that, "In a world where everything's photographed, where kids are constantly snapping photos on their cellphones and where youthful indiscretion is exactly the same as it's always been, the consequences can be much greater".

In 2020, Steyer authored Which Side of History: How Technology is Reshaping Democracy and Our Lives. Bruce Reed, Deputy Chief of Staff to President Joe Biden, co-wrote a chapter pushing for reforms of the Communications Decency Act. Sacha Baron Cohen and Michael Bloomberg were also contributors.

In 2025, Steyer launched the podcast “Which Side of History?”, exploring topics in education, technology, politics, and public policy.

== Personal life ==
Steyer lives in the Bay Area with his wife, Liz (née Butler), and their four children. His wife is the Director of the California Institute on Law, Neuroscience and Education, an interdisciplinary research and policy institute funded by the state of California.
