= William D. Hansen =

American businessman

William Hansen
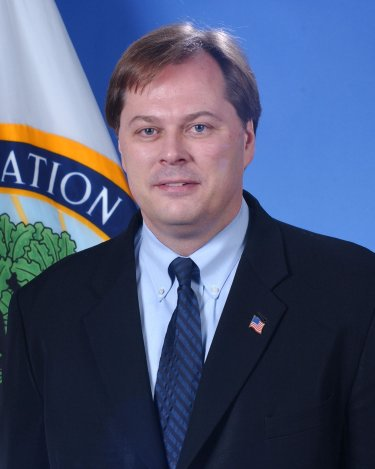

United States Deputy Secretary of Education
- In office May 24, 2001 – October 5, 2003
- President: George W. Bush
- Preceded by: Frank Holleman
- Succeeded by: Eugene W. Hickok

Personal details
- Born: Pocatello, Idaho
- Party: Republican
- Education: George Mason University (BS); Idaho State University
- Profession: businessman

William D. Hansen is an American businessman and a former Deputy Secretary of Education who served in the George W. Bush administration from 2001 to 2003.

== Career ==
As Deputy Secretary, Hansen functioned as Department's chief executive officer, managing 5,000 employees and overseeing an annual budget of $100 billion. He earned the highest ratings from the Office of Management and Budget for the effective implementation of President Bush's agenda, and was one of the architects of the No Child Left Behind Act.

Following his government service, Hansen took a board seat with First Marblehead Corporation, a private student loan provider, and he co-founded, with former U. S. Secretary of Education Rod Paige, the Chartwell Group a company which, among other things, created and sold materials to assist schools in complying with the No Child Left Behind Act.

== Early career ==
From 1993 until his appointment to the Department of Education, Hansen was the president and CEO of the Education Finance Council, a trade organization which represents private sector student loan providers with a portfolio of approximately $40 billion.

Between 1991 and 1993, Hansen served in the administration of President George H. W. Bush as Assistant Secretary of Education for Management and Budget, the chief financial officer for the U.S. Department of Education. Prior to that time, Hanson did a one year stint as an acting Assistant Secretary for Legislation and Congressional Affairs, also with the Education Department.

== Education and family life ==
Hansen grew up in Pocatello, Idaho, and attended Idaho State University and George Mason University which granted him a B.S. in economics. Hansen lives in McLean Virginia, is married and the father of six children.

== Activities and awards ==
Hansen received a distinguished alumni award from Idaho State University in 2003.

He has served on numerous boards over the years including the National Commission on the Cost of Higher Education, the Student Loan Finance Corporation, Collegenet and the College Access Foundation.

In addition to holding a seat on the First Marblehead Board, Hansen is currently a member of the Romney Institute Advisory Board at Brigham Young University's Marriott School of Management.

== See also ==
- Student loans in the United States
- No Child Left Behind Act

Political offices
Preceded by Frank Holleman	United States Deputy Secretary of Education; 2001–2003	Succeeded by Eugene W. Hickok
