= Sara Tucker =

American business executive

Sara Martinez Tucker
- Born: Laredo, Texas, U.S.
- Occupation: Former chief executive officer of the National Math and Science Initiative
- Board member of: American Electric Power, Nationwide Mutual Insurance Company, Service Corporation International, Achieve Partners Management LLC

Sara Martinez Tucker is a former chief executive officer of the National Math and Science Initiative. She was formerly the Under Secretary of Education at the U.S. Department of Education and a former president and chief executive officer of the Hispanic Scholarship Fund (HSF).

She is the lead independent director Board of directors at American Electric Power, and serves on the boards of Nationwide Mutual Insurance Company,Service Corporation International and sits on the advisory board of Achieve Partners Management LLC.

She also serves on the University of Notre Dame’s Board of Fellows and Board of Trustees.

She previously served on The University of Texas System Board of Regents between 2015 and 2019, acting as Chairperson between 2017 and 2018. She also served on the boards of Xerox, Sprint, and Cornerstone OnDemand Inc.

== Early life ==
A native of Laredo, Texas, Tucker received her undergraduate degree in journalism, graduating with honors, from the University of Texas at Austin (UT). She was a general-assignments reporter for the San Antonio Express before returning to UT, where she received a master of business administration degree with high honors.

== AT&T ==
Before joining HSF in 1997, Tucker spent 16 years at AT&T, the first Latina to reach the company's executive level. In her last assignment at the company, she was a regional vice president for AT&T's Global Business Communications Systems, where she led a $400 million division to its highest profit levels. Before this, she was vice president for consumer operations, a $370 million operation with 6,500 employees serving AT&T's 80 million consumers. Under her leadership, this group contributed to the division's receipt of the Malcolm Baldrige National Quality Award.

== Hispanic Scholarship Fund ==
Tucker worked for nine years as the CEO and president of the Hispanic Scholarship Fund (HSF), where she aimed to double the rate of Hispanics earning college degrees. Tucker raised $280 million for scholarships, growing annual scholarships from $3 million to over $25 million, and launched community outreach programs to raise college expectations in Latino families and communities. She also increased the organization's annual budget from $3.5 million to more than $40 million, raised a landmark $50 million grant from Lilly Endowment, Inc., and stewarded the Hispanic portion of the $1 billion Gates Millennium Scholars Program.

== U.S. Under Secretary of Education ==
Tucker was nominated for the position of U.S. Under Secretary of Education by President George W. Bush on September 5, 2006, and was confirmed by the Senate on December 9, 2006. As Under Secretary, she oversaw all policies, programs and activities related to post-secondary education, vocational and adult education, and Federal Student Aid.

She developed and implemented two programs to increase access to college: a joint initiative with the U.S. Treasury Department to make nearly $70 billion in 2008-09 federal student loans available during the financial crisis, an effort described by The Wall Street Journal as "one bright spot in a season of crises and bailouts", and the website, college.gov (now StudentAid.gov), which helps students and families to prepare for college.

In addition to the oversight of over $32 billion in disbursed appropriations and almost 5,600 discretionary awards, Tucker provided expert testimony before congressional committees and special hearings, led policy discussions within the administration and with trade associations, and led or represented the United States in international delegations.

== The National Math and Science Initiative ==
In 2013, Tucker was elected as the chief executive officer of The National Math and Science Initiative (NMSI), a Dallas-based non-profit dedicated to expanding access and achievement in rigorous education, particularly in science, technology, engineering and math (STEM). She was succeeded by Matthew Randazzo in 2015.

== Recognition and philanthropy ==
In 2005, Time named her one of the 25 most influential Hispanics in America; Town & Country ranked her among the new, young, breed of philanthropists. Tucker has also been named as an Outstanding Young Texas Ex and a Distinguished Alumna at The University of Texas at Austin, and she has received honorary doctorates from the University of Notre Dame, Boston College and the University of Maryland University College.
