= Blue Meridian Partners =

American non-profit organization

- Formation: 2016; 10 years ago
- Type: Nonprofit
- Headquarters: New York
- CEO: Jim Shelton
- Website: https://www.bluemeridian.org/

Blue Meridian Partners is a nonprofit organization focused on improving the lives of young people and families in poverty in the United States. The organization operates by connecting philanthropists with social sector organizations to help expand their programs' reach and impact.

== History ==
Blue Meridian was initially created by the Edna McConnell Clark Foundation, its CEO Nancy Roob, and nine other donors in 2016. It was formed as a grant-making collaborative, designed to expand the reach of charities serving low-income children in the United States.

In 2018, Blue Meridian became an independent nonprofit. Its funding partners include MacKenzie Scott, the Duke Endowment, the Charles and Lynn Schusterman Family Philanthropies, the Druckenmiller Foundation, the George Kaiser Family Foundation, the Sergey Brin Family Foundation and Ballmer Group.

== Operations ==
Blue Meridian is a philanthropic collaborative nonprofit organization. Under this model, Blue Meridian serves as a convener, identifying philanthropists who want to pool resources to collectively fund social sector initiatives addressing economic and social mobility.

As of 2025, Blue Meridian had three investment portfolios. One of these is Place Matters, which funds place-based, multisector partnerships. Examples of other Blue Meridian funded initiatives include Nurse-Family Partnership and Youth Villages, the HBCU Transformation Project, Upstream USA, HealthySteps, and Partners for Rural Impact.

During the COVID-19 pandemic, Blue Meridian supported GiveDirectly, the National Domestic Workers Alliance, One Fair Wage, the Workers Lab and others.

== Leadership ==
In December 2024, Blue Meridian announced Jim Shelton, previously president and chief investment and impact officer, would move into the role of CEO. Shelton is a former Deputy Secretary of the Department of Education, having served under President Barack Obama. Founding CEO Nancy Roob became the executive chair on the organization's board.
