= United States Deputy Secretary of Education =

Focuses primarily on K–12 education policy

Deputy Secretary of Education of the United States of America
- Seal of the Department of Education

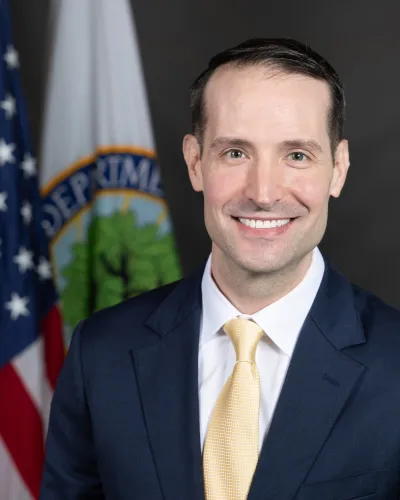
- Incumbent; Nicholas Kent; Acting since February 5, 2026
- United States Department of Education
- Style: Mr. / Madam Deputy Secretary
- Reports to: United States Secretary of Education
- Seat: Washington, D.C.
- Appointer: The president; with Senate advice and consent
- Constituting instrument: 20 U.S.C. § 3412
- First holder: David T. Kearns
- Website: Official website

The deputy secretary of education oversees and manages the development of policies in the United States Department of Education. The deputy secretary focuses primarily on K–12 education policy, such as No Child Left Behind, the High School Initiative, and the Individuals with Disabilities Education Act. The deputy secretary also has responsibility for carrying out the intergovernmental relations of the department. The deputy secretary becomes acting secretary of education in the event of the secretary's absence, disability, or a vacancy in the Office of Secretary.

The office of the deputy secretary coordinates the work of the Office of Elementary and Secondary Education, the Office of Innovation and Improvement, the Office of English Language Acquisition, the Office of Special Education and Rehabilitative Services, and the Office of Safe and Drug-Free Schools. The deputy secretary also oversees the department's LEP Partnership, the Office for Small and Disadvantaged Business Utilization, and the department's partnership with The History Channel.

The deputy secretary is nominated by the president and confirmed by the United States Senate. The deputy secretary is paid at level II of the Executive Schedule, meaning as of 2006, the deputy secretary receives a basic annual salary of $162,000.

== List of deputy secretaries of education ==
#	Image	Name	Term began	Term ended	President(s) served under
1		David T. Kearns	May 31, 1991	January 20, 1993	George H. W. Bush
2		Madeleine M. Kunin	January 1993	August 1996	Bill Clinton
3		Marshall S. Smith	1997	1999	Bill Clinton
4		Frank Holleman	December 28, 1999	January 20, 2001	Bill Clinton
5		William D. Hansen	May 28, 2001	October 5, 2003	George W. Bush
6		Eugene W. Hickok	October 5, 2003	January 20, 2005	George W. Bush
7		Raymond Simon	May 26, 2005	January 20, 2009	George W. Bush
8		Anthony Wilder Miller	July 24, 2009	July 2013	Barack Obama
9		James H. Shelton III	July 2013	January 4, 2015	Barack Obama
–		John King Jr. Acting, Sr. Advisor	January 4, 2015	March 14, 2016	Barack Obama
–		James Cole Jr. Acting	March 14, 2016	January 20, 2017	Barack Obama
10		Mick Zais	May 17, 2018	January 20, 2021	Donald Trump
–		Denise L. Carter; Acting	January 20, 2021	May 18, 2021	Joe Biden
11		Cindy Marten	May 18, 2021	January 20, 2025	Joe Biden
–		Richard Smith; Acting	January 20, 2025	February 5, 2026	Donald Trump
–		Nicholas Kent; Acting	February 5, 2026	Incumbent	Donald Trump
