= Anthony W. Miller =

American government official

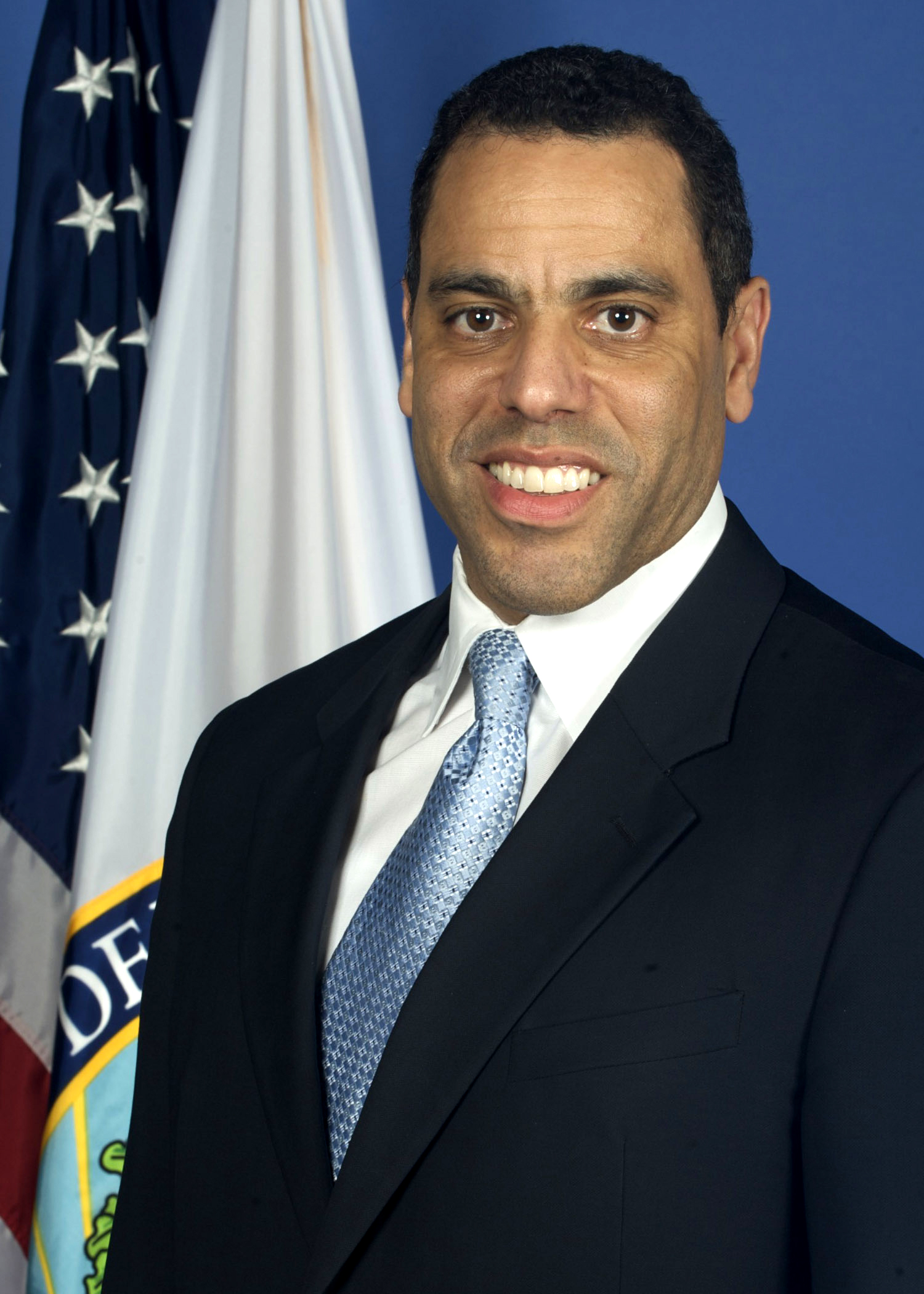

United States Deputy Secretary of Education
- In office July 24, 2009 – July 2013
- President: Barack Obama
- Preceded by: Raymond Simon
- Succeeded by: James H. Shelton III

Personal details
- Born: Anthony Wilder Miller
- Education: Stanford Graduate School of Business; Purdue University
- Website: www.ed.gov

Anthony Wilder "Tony" Miller was the United States deputy secretary of education, confirmed on July 24, 2009, to replace Raymond Simon, who resigned from office on January 20, 2009. Miller was a co-founder at The Vistria Group, LLC, and is the managing partner of private equity firm Excolere Equity Partners, which he founded in 2022.

== Career ==
Prior to joining the Department of Education, Miller had been an operating partner since 2007 with Silver Lake Partners, an investment firm. From 2003 to 2006, Miller was executive vice president of operations at LRN Corporation, a provider of governance and compliance software and legal research services. He also worked for 10 years at McKinsey & Company, where he was a partner that specialized in growth strategies, operating performance improvement, and restructuring for companies throughout the United States, Europe, and Asia.

From 1984 to 1990, Miller also worked for Delco Electronics, a subsidiary of GM Hughes Electronics, where he managed regional channel marketing.

In education, Miller worked with the Los Angeles Unified School District from 1997 to 2000, developing student achievement goals and strategies, budgets and operating plans, and designing metrics and processes for monitoring school performances.

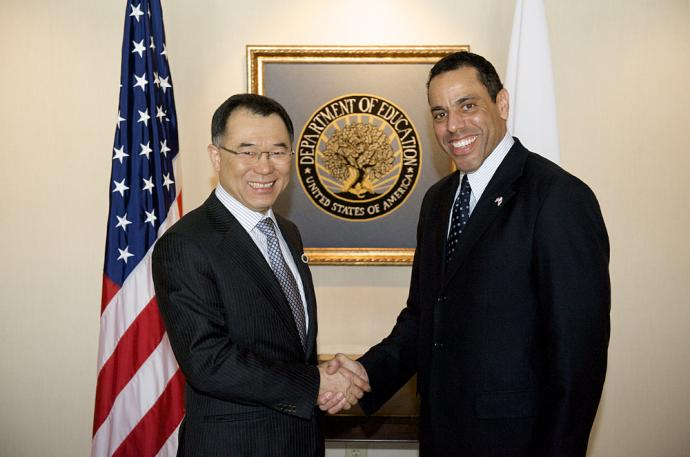
with Shin'ichi Yamanaka (March 12, 2012)

From 2009 to 2013, Miller served as Deputy Secretary of Education in the Obama administration.

In 2017, Anthony W. Miller became board chair of Apollo Education Group, the parent company of the for-profit college University of Phoenix. He and Vistria Group co-CEO Martin Nesbitt are board members of the University of Phoenix, and was involved in the $1.1 billion sale to take University of Phoenix private in 2016.

== Education ==
Miller holds an M.B.A. from the Stanford Graduate School of Business and a bachelor's degree in industrial engineering from Purdue University.

== Personal life ==
Miller and his wife, Carole, have one son and reside in Arlington, Virginia.
