= Common Sense Media =

American nonprofit organization

- Type: Nonprofit organization
- Genre: Lobbying; advocacy; research; entertainment reviews; parenting; education
- Founded: 2003; 23 years ago
- Founder: James P. Steyer (CEO)
- Headquarters: San Francisco, California, U.S.
- Revenue: US$25.4 million (2018)
- Total assets: US$40.7 million (2022)
- Website: commonsensemedia.org

Common Sense Media (CSM) is an American nonprofit organization that reviews and provides ratings for media and technology with the goal of providing information on their suitability for children. It also funds research on the role of media in the lives of children and advocates publicly for child-friendly policies and laws regarding media and education.

Founded by Jim Steyer in 2003, Common Sense Media reviews and allows users to review media for adults and children. It has reviews of books, films, television shows, video games, apps, websites, podcasts, and YouTube channels and rates them in terms of age-appropriate educational content, such as "positive role models", "positive messages", "diverse representation", "violence and scariness", "sexual content", "language", "consumerism" and more, for families and caregivers making media choices for their children. It has also developed a set of ratings to evaluate apps, games, and websites used in a learning environment.

By 2020, the organization's ratings and reviews reached more than 100 million households and its digital citizenship curriculum is taught by more than one million teachers in the U.S. and other countries.

== History ==
After founding JP Kids, an educational media company for children, and Children Now, a national child advocacy and media group, Jim Steyer founded Common Sense Media in 2003. In an interview with The New York Times, Steyer said he intended to "create a huge constituency for parents and children in the same way that Mothers Against Drunk Driving or the AARP has done." The group received $500,000 in seed money from a group of donors including Charles Schwab, George Roberts, and James Coulter.

To assess parents' concern about their children's media habits, Common Sense Media commissioned a poll, which found that "64 percent [of parents with children aged 2–17] believed that media products in general were inappropriate for their families. It said that 81 percent expressed concern that the media in general were encouraging violent or antisocial behavior in children." The polling firm, Penn, Schoen & Berland Associates, said that "only one out of five interviewed 'fully trusted' the industry-controlled ratings systems for music, movies, video games and television."

In August 2020, Common Sense Media announced the formation of a for-profit subsidiary, Common Sense Networks, to create and distribute original media targeted at children. Common Sense Networks then announced an OTT platform named Sensical, which launched June 29, 2021.

In January 2024, the first annual Common Sense Summit on America's Kids and Families was held, featuring speakers such as Vivek Murthy, Hillary Clinton, and Sam Altman.

== Entertainment reviews and endorsements ==
Common Sense Media reviews thousands of movies, TV shows, music, video games, apps, web sites and books. Based on developmental criteria, the reviews provide guidance regarding each title's age appropriateness, as well as a "content grid" that rates particular aspects of the title including educational value, violence, sex, gender messages and role models. For each title, Common Sense Media indicates the age recommendation for which a title is either appropriate or most relevant. An overall five-star quality rating is also included, as are discussion questions to help families talk about their entertainment. In addition to Common Sense Media's traditional rating system, they also offer a set of learning based ratings, which are designed to determine complex educational values.

Common Sense Media began allowing studios to use their ratings and endorsements in 2014. The first film to use the endorsement was Alexander and the Terrible, Horrible, No Good, Very Bad Day. The organization's current rating system differs from the system used by the Motion Picture Association and the Entertainment Software Rating Board.

Their online resources for parents (which include reviews and parents' guides) are behind a metered paywall; parents and caregivers without a membership have limited access to Common Sense Media's online resources. A paid membership or subscription is required for unlimited access to the organization's website and app. This paid membership for access is intended to cover its operating costs and keep it free from advertiser influence.

In 2023, Common Sense Media released an independent ratings system that assesses AI products’ handling of private data as well as its overall suitability for children.

== Distribution partnerships ==
Common Sense Media partners with a number of media companies that distribute the organization's free content to more than 100 million homes in the United States. According to their website, the organization has content distribution contracts with Road Runner, TiVo, Yahoo!, Comcast, Charter Communications, DIRECTV, Disney, NBC Universal, Netflix, Best Buy, Google, Huffington Post, Fandango, Trend Micro, Verizon Communications, Nickelodeon, Bing, Cox Communications, Kaleidescape, AT&T, and NCM.

== Education ==
In 2009, Common Sense Media partnered with Harvard University and the organization Global Kids to organize a three-way communication with parents, teenagers, and educators about issues faced in the online world.

In 2012, Common Sense Media released its "Digital Passport", an online curriculum designed to teach children how to safely and responsibly navigate the Internet. The courses can be accessed free by classroom teachers, who are then able to monitor their students' progress. Digital passport lessons are presented as games that reward progress with badges.

=== Graphite ===
In 2013, Common Sense Media launched Graphite, an online resource for teachers that allows them to review and rate educational technology. The project is supported by Chicago philanthropist Susan Crown and Microsoft co-founder Bill Gates' bgC3.

== Advocacy and endorsements ==
Common Sense Media has played a role in influencing billions of dollars in government spending on education-related technologies including classroom broadband access and various learning apps.

=== Online privacy ===
Common Sense Media supported the U.S. Department of Commerce's creation of an "online privacy policy", which would include a "Privacy Bill of Rights" and would make clear which types of personal information companies are allowed to keep on clients. It has also called for updates to the Children's Online Privacy Protection Act (COPPA) rules to ensure that they keep pace with changes in technology since the law was passed in 1998 – as documented by the organization in a report to the Federal Trade Commission as part of a review of the law.

The organization also helped Massachusetts Representative Edward Markey and Texas Representative Joe Barton draft legislation that required websites aimed at children under 13 to obtain parental permission before collecting personal information. According to The Wall Street Journal, the group also wanted websites to feature an "eraser button" that would allow children and teens to delete information that they've posted online about themselves. The group also favored a ban on "behavioral marketing" to children—ads targeted at children based on their online activities.

In 2013, Common Sense Media pushed for the passing of California's "Eraser Bill". In 2014, they advocated the passing of California Senate Bill 1177, which prohibits the sale and disclosure of schools' online student data. The bill also forbids targeted ads based on school information and the creation of student profiles when not used for education purposes. As of January 2015, social media websites must allow California children under age 18 to remove their own postings.

In 2018, Common Sense Media advocated for the California Consumer Privacy Act (CCPA). Common Sense Media also endorsed the California Privacy Rights Act (CPRA), a ballot measure to protect the privacy rights of California consumers and increase penalties on corporations that fail to protect children's privacy.

=== Platform accountability ===
Common Sense Media supported Stop Hate for Profit, a boycott where advertisers were asked to pull their ads from Facebook in response to the platform's spread of misinformation and hate speech. In July 2020, more than 500 companies joined the boycott, including Adidas, Coca-Cola, and Unilever.

Founder Jim Steyer launched the Future of Tech Commission with former Massachusetts Governor Deval Patrick and former Education Secretary Margaret Spellings. The commission will develop a tech policy agenda for the Biden administration.

=== Violent video games ===
Common Sense Media played a major role in the passage of the 2005 California law criminalizing the sale of violent video games to minors. The organization submitted an amicus brief to the Supreme Court regarding the case Brown v. Entertainment Merchants Association (formerly Schwarzenegger v. Entertainment Merchants Association). They published a survey, conducted by Zogby International, which asked 2,100 parents whether or not they supported the "video game ban bill" – CA Law AB 1793; results showed that 72% of the respondents expressed support for the bill, and another 75% held negative views of the video game industry when it comes to how they protect children from violent video games.

On August 12, 2006, Common Sense Media protested to the Federal Trade Commission about the ESRB's rating downgrade of a revised version of Manhunt 2 from "Adults Only" to "Mature". It protested on the basis that the revised version of the game, which was censored to prevent the game from remaining banned in both countries, was still banned in the UK via the ratings given by the British Board of Film Classification (BBFC). They also noted that players could still play a "leaked uncensored version" of Manhunt 2 on modded PlayStation 2, as Take-Two Interactive mentioned. The organization asked the FTC to launch a federal investigation into the ESRB rating process, citing the wide availability of the leaked version and the damage to children that the censored version still had.

Questioning whether Common Sense Media had begun functioning as a lobbying group rather than advocacy group, the Los Angeles Times called the organization "one of the most zealous voices when it comes to encouraging state legislation limiting the sale of ultra-violent games to minors" and was "splitting hairs" regarding the difference between lobbying and advocacy in its efforts.

=== Media and child health ===
Common Sense Media participated in the FCC's Child Obesity Taskforce in April 2006 and hosted Beyond Primetime, a panel discussion and conference on issues related to children and media, featuring lead executives from the United States' top media.

In June 2006, Common Sense Media and The Department of Clinical Bioethics at the National Institutes of Health released a white paper that outlines the ways that media exposure can impact children's health. The paper evaluated 173 media-related studies from the past 28 years and concluded that "In 80% of the studies, greater media exposure is associated with negative health outcomes for children and adolescents."

In October 2006, the organization released a white paper compiled from existing research on body image perceptions in children and teens. The paper states more than half of boys as young as 6 to 8 think their ideal weight is thinner than their current size and that children with parents who are dissatisfied with their bodies are more likely to feel that way about their own.

In April 2015, they launched the national advocacy effort, Common Sense Kids Action, to advocate for certain state and federal efforts to bolster education for children.

Common Sense Media released a PSA with Goodby, Silverstein & Partners in 2017 called Device Free Dinner which featured Will Ferrell as a distracted father at the dinner table, in order to raise awareness for responsible technology and media usage.

Common Sense Media is an endorser of the SUCCESS Act, introduced to the House in July 2021. Common Sense Media partnered with ad agency Goodby Silverstein & Partners in 2021 to encourage low-income families to claim money due to them through the newly-improved Child Tax Credit—as much as $3,600 per child in an eligible family for one year.

In 2023, Common Sense Media partnered with the Dove Self-Esteem Project to advance revisions of the Kids Online Safety Act, a federal bill that supports design standards and safeguards to protect children online.

Common Sense Media is also an endorser of the Affordable Connectivity Program (ACP) as well as the Affordable Connectivity Program Extension Act, introduced to the United States Senate in January 2024. This legislation provides $7 billion for ACP, which provides affordable high-speed internet access to households across the country.

In June 2024, Common Sense Media endorsed the SAFE For Kids Act, which is a New York law that bans "addictive" feeds for minors under the age of 18 without parental consent. Common Sense Media endorsed the act, stating that it would improve mental health for minors as well as "reel in big tech".

In early 2026, Common Sense Media launched its Youth AI Safety Institute, an independent global testing and research institute that evaluates the risk AI tools may pose to children, teens, and education. Debuted at the Copenhagen Summit, the institute provides safety parameters for tech firms and educational information to parents about AI usage.

== Research ==
In September 2017, Common Sense Media released a study which it developed in collaboration with the University of Southern California's Annenberg School for Communication and Journalism focused on families in both Japan and the United States and technology use. Surveys of families in the United States were compared to surveys of Japanese families and found that both countries struggle with the impact of technology on family life and relationships.

A study completed by Common Sense Media found that 97% of children between the ages of 11 and 17 use their phones during school hours, while 60% use cellular devices between midnight and 5 A.M. on school nights.

In March 2023, Common Sense Media published research that explored girls' experiences on five popular social media platforms: YouTube, TikTok, Instagram, Snapchat and WhatsApp. Girls who used TikTok were more likely to report feeling addicted to the platform, with nearly 1 in 4 girls stating the apps interfered with their daily sleep routine.

In November 2023, Common Sense Media launched AI Ratings, an initiative to create AI guidelines and education materials to help curate "family friendly" GPT-branded large language models. Common Sense Media then partnered with OpenAI in January 2024 to develop a review system "intended for parents, children and educators to better understand [AI] technology's risks and benefits" as an extension of its AI Ratings initiative.

In 2025, Common Sense Media released the Masculinity and Social Media Study, surveying males aged eleven to seventeen. The study found that nearly three-quarters of boys in that age range are regularly exposed to “masculinity content” that promotes “harmful gender stereotypes” on their algorithmic social media feeds, leading to low self-esteem as well as emotional regulatory issues. Common Sense Media also published its State of Kids and Families in America 2025 report, which surveyed children aged twelve to seventeen on topics such as generational gaps and politics. The State of Kids and Families in America 2025 findings indicated that two-thirds of those surveyed felt that elected officials did not reflect the needs of young people and less than half considered themselves to be “better off” than when their parents grew up. Respondents that identified as being either male or white reflected an even lower percentage of the metrics.
