= National Math and Science Initiative =

Non-profit organization in the USA

The National Math and Science Initiative (NMSI) is a non-profit organization based in Dallas, Texas, that launched in 2007. Its mission is to improve student performance in the subjects of science, technology, engineering, and math (STEM) in the United States. It attempts to do this by scaling up local academic programs to a national level.

== History of the initiative ==
In 2005, the National Academies commissioned a report titled “Rising Above the Gathering Storm” which asserts that student achievement in the subjects of math and science has declined in the United States, while other countries have increased their student achievement scores in the same subject areas. The report recommended the creation of a non-profit organization to help improve math and science education in the United States. Several authors of the report partnered with Peter O’Donnell Jr. to meet this need, effectively establishing NMSI's board of directors and committing to bring both the UTeach and NMSI's College Readiness program (formerly known as NMSI's Comprehensive AP Program and the Advanced Placement Training and Incentive Program [APTIP]) to scale nationally. ExxonMobil invested $125 million to launch the effort, which was later supplemented by an additional $125 million from corporations, foundations, individual donors and government agencies – creating an effective public-private partnership model that continues to sustain the organization today. Tom Luce, Assistant Secretary of Education under President George W. Bush, was the Founding CEO and Chairman of the Board.
