= Gerri Elliott =

American business executive

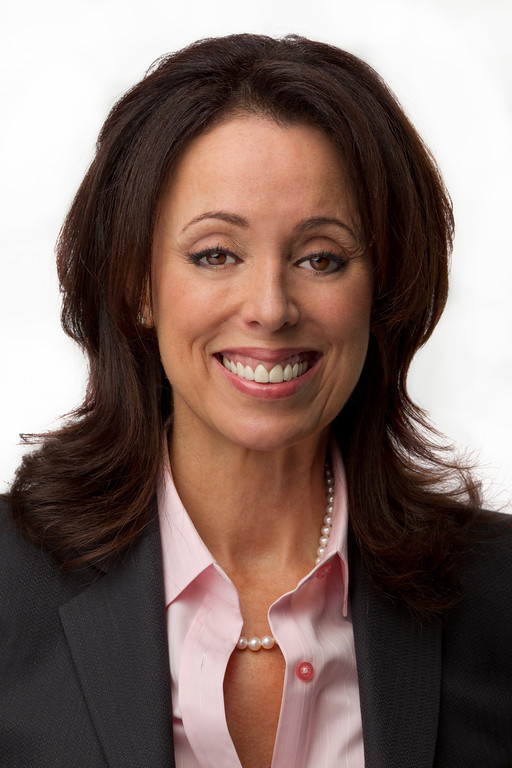
- Born: Geraldine Taaffe; New York, New York, U.S.
- Education: New York University
- Occupation: Business executive
- Years active: 1980–present
- Board member of: Whirlpool Corporation
- Children: 2

Gerri Elliott is an American business executive.

== Biography ==
Elliott holds a bachelor's degree in political science from New York University.

Gerri is currently a Senior Advisor for Boston Consulting Group. She was formerly the Chief Customer & Partner Officer for Cisco. She is the founder of Broadrooms.com, a site devoted to executive women who serve or want to serve on corporate boards. Broadrooms is an informational resource, consolidating best practices, education, events, news and blogs related to women on boards.

Elliott spent almost 22 years at IBM both in the U.S. and abroad. She held key executive and management positions in strategy development, services and consulting, product management, and sales field and headquarters leadership.

In 2001, Gerri joined Microsoft as CVP, Industry Solutions Group, to create worldwide sales and marketing teams dedicated to Retail, Healthcare, Financial Services, Manufacturing, Media and Entertainment, Public Sector and Communication Sector teams. She co-headed the company's $10B North American subsidiary and additionally developed and implemented a world class selling strategy across the sales organization. As CVP, WW Public Sector, reporting to the COO, she led a team of more than 2,000 sales and marketing professionals that served government, education and health care customers in more than 100 countries. She grew the business from $4.7B to $8.0B over 3 years. She left Microsoft as one of the most senior female executives in the company.

In 2009, Elliott joined Juniper Networks as the Executive Vice President of Strategic Alliances. She held this position until July 2011 when she was named EVP, Chief Sales Officer. In November 2012 she assumed additional responsibility for Juniper's Services and Support organizations and in July 2013 took leadership of Marketing. As EVP, Chief Customer Officer, she led a global organization of more than 3,500 professionals that included direct and indirect sales, systems engineering, marketing, advanced technologies, channel partners and alliances, field operations, services and support in 140 offices in over 40 countries. In 2014, she announced her personal decision to retire. She acted as a strategic advisor to the CEO for an additional six months before leaving Juniper in July 2014.

In 2014, she was named to the board of Whirlpool Corp. She served on the advisory board for the Center for Executive Women Senior Leadership Program at Northwestern University’s Kellogg School of Management. that same year she announced that she would be joining the board of Charlotte Russe, a San Francisco-based clothing retail store. Her experience in seeking a board seat was chronicled by Fortune Magazine in September 2014.

She served on the advisory board for Executive Women Sr. Leadership at Kellogg (Northwestern), and was previously on the advisory board of Catalyst, a research organization dedicated to expanding business opportunities for women. She is one of the founding participants in Fortune’s Most Powerful Women/US State Dept’s Global Mentoring program. She has also been a panelist at the 2014 Fortune's Most Powerful Women's Summit, Fortune's Next Gen Conference, Andreesen Horowitz, Catalyst, 2014 Watermark Conference, C200, Women in Retail Summit, and 2013 and 2014 Generation W Women in Leadership Conferences in Jacksonville, Florida.

In March 2018, Elliott joined Cisco as Executive Vice President and Chief Sales and Marketing Officer.

== Honors ==
She is a 2013 YWCA Silicon Valley Tribute to Women (TWIN) award winner, honoring executive women who exemplify excellence in executive level positions. Additional recognition includes the 2012 Profiles in Diversity Journal Women Worth Watching list.
