= Edna McConnell Clark Foundation =

US-based foundation

- Headquarters: New York, NY, United States
- President & CEO: Nancy Roob
- Key people: Ralph Stefano
- Revenue: $51,781,631 (2015)
- Expenses: $67,328,460 (2015)
- Website: www.emcf.org

The Edna McConnell Clark Foundation (also McConnell Clark Foundation, Clark Foundation, or EMCF) is a New York-based institution that currently focuses on providing opportunities for low-income youth (ages 9–24) in the United States. The Foundation makes large, long-term investments, frequently in partnership with other funders, in programs with proven outcomes and growth potential to meet the urgent needs of disadvantaged young people. The foundation previously worked in criminal justice reform, systematic school reform, tropical disease research, and child protection. The founder's fortune was passed from her father, Avon founder David H. McConnell.

== History ==
In 1999, EMCF began to concentrate its resources on economically disadvantaged young people and the organizations that served them. It now focuses on helping high-performing nonprofits develop business plans, organizational capacity, and evidence of their programs' effectiveness so they can expand their programming. In 2007, it committed $39 million and raised $81 million from other organizations and individuals to support three of its most promising grantees. The Foundation has given over $762 million in grants since 1970, and as of September 30, 2013, its assets were approximately $954.5 million.

Alongside nine other donors and CEO Nancy Roob, the foundation created grant-making collaborative Blue Meridian Partners in 2016.

== Leadership ==
President Nancy Roob has led EMCF since 2005.
