= EduCap =

Non-Profit education finance company

- Formation: 1987
- Type: Non-profit organization
- Purpose: Education Finance and Philanthropy
- Location: Washington, D.C.
- Chairman: Catherine B. Reynolds
- Website: Official website

EduCap is an American private non-profit education finance company that was established in 1987. The Catherine B. Reynolds Foundation is the philanthropic affiliate of EduCap Inc.

== History ==
From the 1980s, increasing college tuition costs created demand for more funding than could be provided by federal aid programs.

In 1987, Father John Whalen, a Catholic priest, founded a non-profit loan program to provide private funding for college students in the District of Columbia who did not qualify for government financial aid. In 1988, Catherine B. Reynolds] joined the foundation as comptroller, and renamed the foundation EduCap. She soon became president of the student loan company. EduCap was insolvent when Reynolds was hired, but, as reported by The Washington Post, she established a nationwide private education loan program and established a for-profit affiliate, Servus Financial. It became the first education loan company to securitize credit-based private loans on Wall Street, the first to market private student loan programs directly to consumers, and the first to provide access to education financing as an employee benefit for corporations.

In March 2000, Servus Financial was sold to Wells Fargo Bank. In seven years, the foundation’s initial investment of $60,000 became worth several hundred million dollars. Servus Financial had provided 350,000 private student loans.

== Operations ==
=== Catherine B. Reynolds Foundation ===
The Catherine B. Reynolds Foundation is a United States-based non-profit organization established in 2001. It was financed by the sale of Servus Financial Corporation, chaired by Catherine B. Reynolds. The foundation has donated more than $100 million to beneficiaries in the performing arts, education, and community services.

These include the D.C. College Access Program, the John F. Kennedy Center for the Performing Arts, the National Gallery of Art, National Portrait Gallery, Ford’s Theater Society, Dance Theatre of Harlem, the Blair House Restoration Fund, the National Geographic Society, the National Symphony Orchestra, N Street Village, Library of Congress, the Marine Corps Scholarship Foundation, the MIT YouPitch Entrepreneurship Competition, the Stanford Center on Longevity, and Harvard University.

In 2007, the foundation funded the Museum of the Rockies' excavation of one of its most famous Tyrannosaurus rex fossils and named her Catherine, after Reynolds, when they discovered it was a female.

==== Catherine B. Reynolds ====
Reynolds was selected by Businessweek magazine as one of the 50 most philanthropic living Americans.

She is a current or former trustee of New York University, Vanderbilt University, Harvard Kennedy School's Center for Public Leadership, the John F. Kennedy Center for the Performing Arts, the D.C. College Access Program, Dance Theatre of Harlem, Inova Fairfax Hospital Foundation, and National Geographic International Advisory Council.

She served on the U.S. secretary of Education's Commission on the Future of Higher Education during the administration of President George W. Bush. She has received honorary degrees from Georgetown University, Morehouse College and Willamette University. She also received the Gallatin Medal from New York University.

In 2005, she received the Woodrow Wilson Award for Public Service from the Woodrow Wilson International Center for Scholars.

She was selected as a 2011 Washingtonian of the Year.

Reynolds currently serves on the boards of General Dynamics Corporation, Lindblad Expeditions, LLC, and VitaKey Inc.

In 2019, Reynolds was selected by the secretary of the Navy as the sponsor of the USS Jack H. Lucas, the first Flight III Arleigh Burke-class destroyer.

In April 2020, President Donald J. Trump appointed Reynolds to serve on the Great American Economic Revival Industry Group.

In October 2023, Reynolds was named one of the "Most Powerful Women in Washington" by Washingtonian magazine.

== Criticism ==
In 2003, the CBS program 60 Minutes reported that Reynolds withdrew a donation of $38 million from the Smithsonian Institution following criticism of a proposal for a Hall of Achievement exhibition. Her foundation instead pledged $100 million to the John F. Kennedy Center for the Performing Arts.

In 2007, The Washington Post criticized EduCap for interest rates charged to high-risk borrowers and the ownership of a corporate Gulfstream V aircraft.
