= Margaret Spellings =

American politician and educator (born 1957)

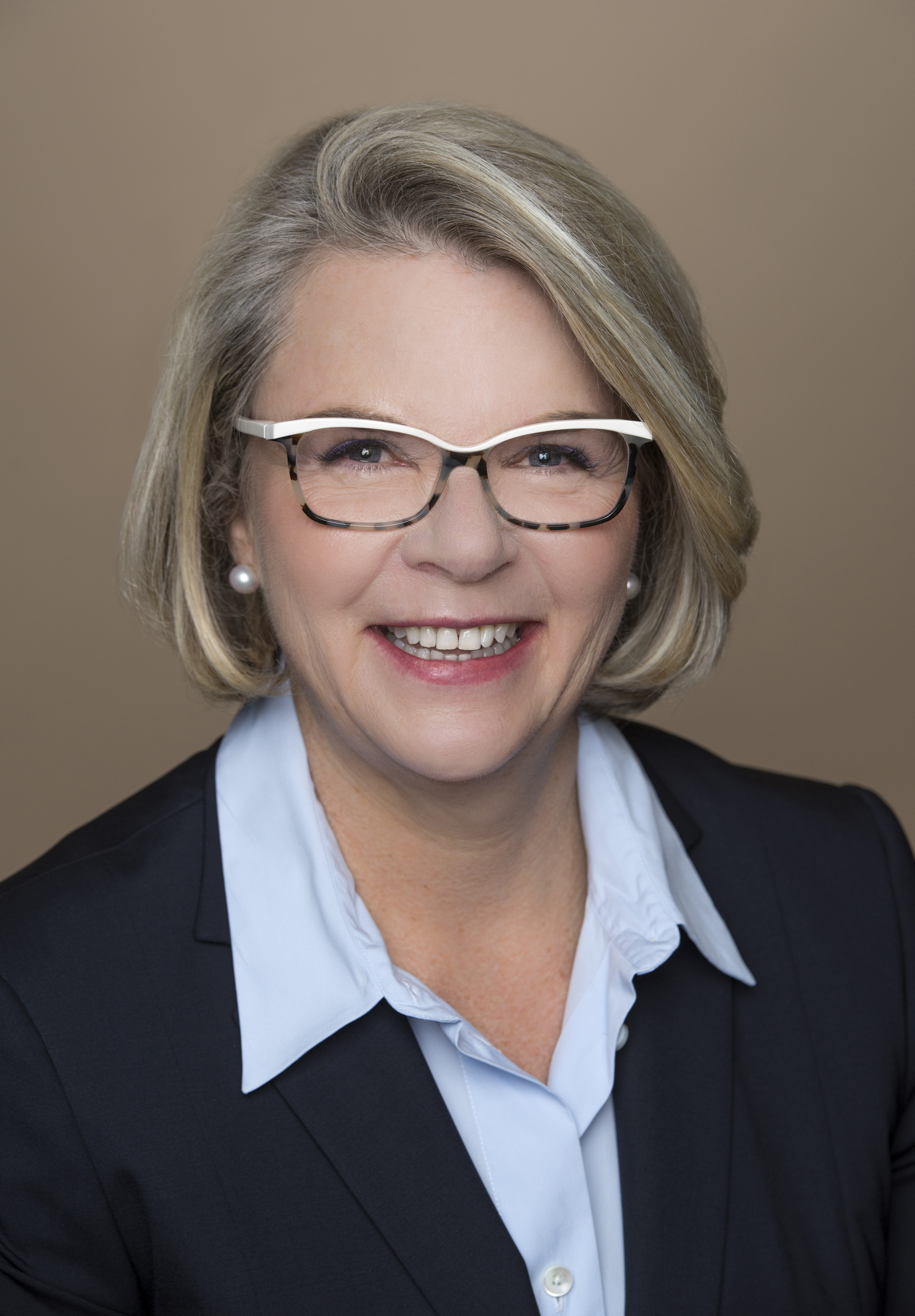
- Spellings in 2016

President of the University of North Carolina System
- In office March 1, 2016 – March 1, 2019
- Preceded by: Thomas Ross
- Succeeded by: William L. Roper (acting)

8th United States Secretary of Education
- In office January 20, 2005 – January 20, 2009
- President: George W. Bush
- Deputy: Raymond Simon
- Preceded by: Rod Paige
- Succeeded by: Arne Duncan

Director of the Domestic Policy Council
- In office January 30, 2002 – January 5, 2005
- President: George W. Bush
- Preceded by: John Bridgeland
- Succeeded by: Claude Allen

Personal details
- Born: Margaret Dudar; November 30, 1957 (age 68) Ann Arbor, Michigan, U.S.
- Party: Republican
- Spouse(s): Gregg LaMontagne (divorced) Robert Spellings (divorced)
- Children: 2 daughters
- Education: Texas A&M University (attended); University of Houston (BA)

Margaret M. LaMontagne Spellings (née Dudar; born November 30, 1957) is an American government and non-profit executive who serves as president and CEO of the Bipartisan Policy Center. She previously served as the eighth United States secretary of education from 2005 to 2009. After leaving the government, Spellings served as president of the University of North Carolina System, overseeing the seventeen campus system from 2016 to 2019. She then served as president and CEO of Texas 2036 from 2019 to 2023.

Spellings worked in several positions under George W. Bush during his tenure as Governor of Texas and President of the United States. She was one of the principal proponents of the 2001 No Child Left Behind Act that aimed at reforming primary and secondary education. She served as education secretary for the entire second term of Bush's administration, during which time she convened the Commission on the Future of Higher Education to recommend reform at the post-secondary level.

== Early life and education ==
Margaret M. Dudar was born on November 30, 1957, in Ann Arbor, Michigan, and moved with her family to Houston, Texas, when she was in the third grade. She graduated from Sharpstown High School in 1975.

She earned a Bachelor of Arts degree in political science from the University of Houston in 1979 and worked in an education reform commission under Texas Governor William P. Clements and as associate executive director for the Texas Association of School Boards. Before her appointment to George W. Bush's presidential administration, Spellings was the political director for Bush's first gubernatorial campaign in 1994, and later became a senior advisor to Bush during his Texas governorship from 1995 to 2000.

== Secretary of Education ==
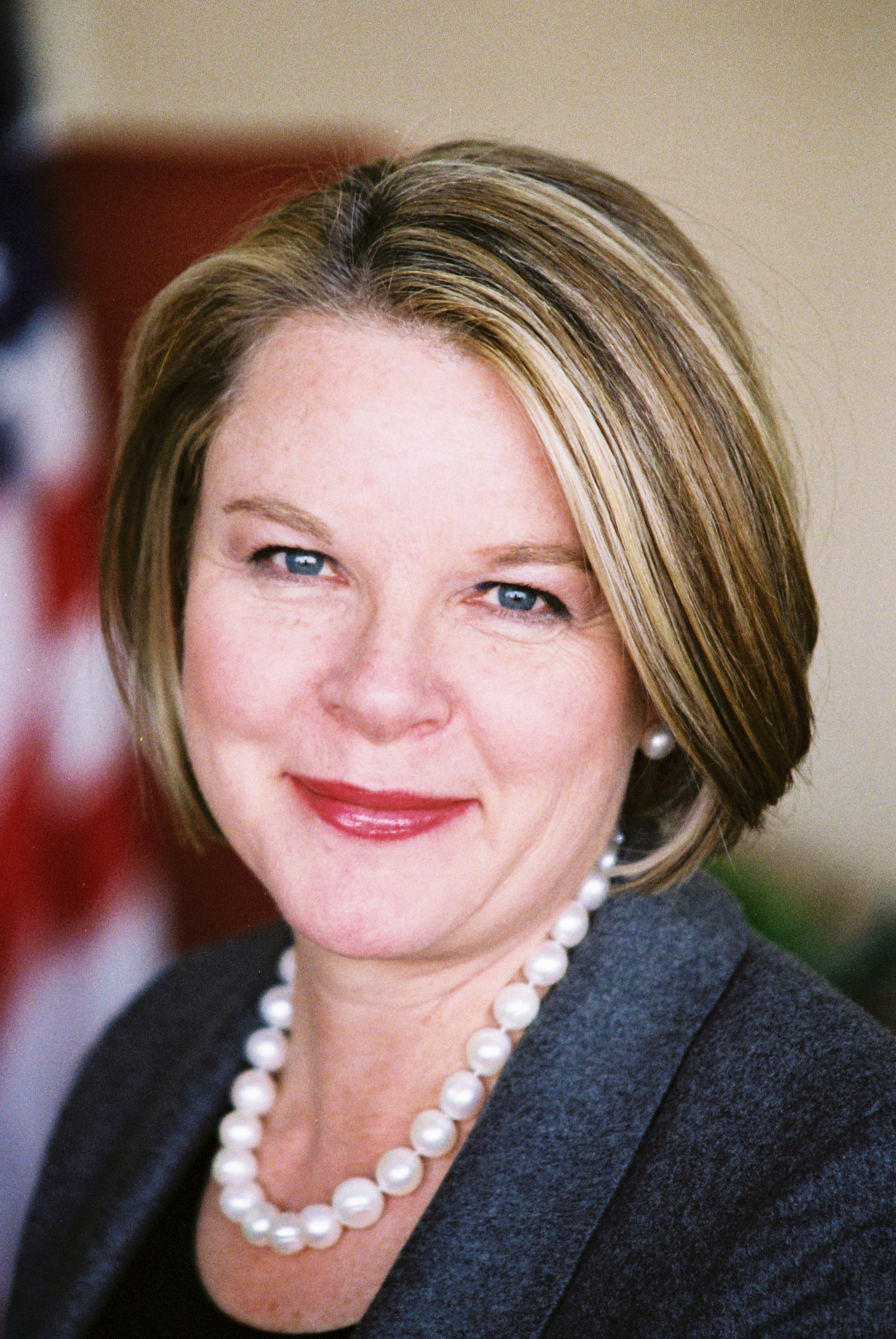
Spellings's official Secretary of Education portrait

Following Rod Paige's departure as Secretary of Education, Spellings was nominated to that position by President George W. Bush on November 17, 2004, confirmed by the U.S. Senate on January 20, 2005, which also marked the beginning of Bush's second presidential term, and ceremonially sworn in on January 31 the same year. She was the second female Secretary of Education.

=== Postcards from Buster controversy ===
On January 21, 2005, one day after being confirmed as Secretary of Education, Spellings wrote a letter to the Public Broadcasting Service warning the network not to air an episode of the children's program Postcards from Buster. In that episode, the animated bunny Buster visits Vermont to learn about maple sugar production and meets real-life children who have lesbian parents. The children tell Buster they have a "mom and stepmom." A child explains that one of the women is her stepmother whom she loves. No other comment is made about the family.

Spellings's letter reminded Pat Mitchell, CEO of PBS, that Postcards from Buster was funded in part by the Department of Education and "that many parents would not want their young children exposed to the life-styles portrayed in the episode." PBS decided not to distribute the episode, but WGBH, the public television station in Boston, said it would air it and offered it to any station "willing to defy the Education Department."

Cusi Cram, a writer for Arthur (from which that program was spun-off), later wrote a play titled Dusty and the Big Bad World, based on the controversy.

In a 2022 statement about the show's 25th and final season, Spellings told NPR that "the world is very different today" and that the government "now reflects a greater openness to the multi-faceted, diverse stories that Americans can tell about themselves, their lives, and the country we share."

=== No Child Left Behind ===
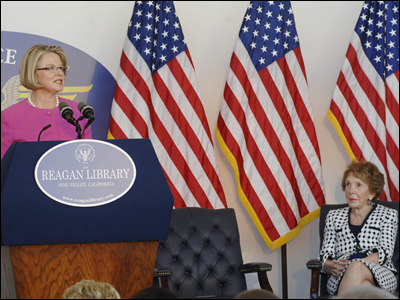
Spellings delivers a speech at the Ronald Reagan Presidential Library; former first lady Nancy Reagan is seated at the right

In April 2005, on PBS's The NewsHour with Jim Lehrer, she called Connecticut's resistance to the No Child Left Behind Act the "soft bigotry of low expectations". According to the program's transcript, she said:

I think it's regrettable, frankly, when the achievement gap between African-American and Anglo kids in Connecticut is quite large. And I think it's unfortunate for those families and those students that they are trying to find a loophole to get out of the law as opposed to attending to the needs of those kids. That's the notion, the soft bigotry of low expectations, as the president calls it, that No Child Left Behind rejects.

=== Controversy overseeing student loan programs ===
On May 10, 2007, Spellings testified before the House Education and Labor Committee responding to criticism from New York Attorney General Andrew Cuomo that the Education Department had been "asleep at the switch" in overseeing student loan programs, allowing corruption and conflicts of interest to spread. Spellings has further gone on record to say that she is disregarding the suggestion by the Inspector General to hold the loan companies accountable for their graft.

Altha Cravey and Robert Siegel wrote in the News & Observer that Spellings had been "supporting for-profit colleges who prey on students – and then profiting off those same students when they default on their loans." Spellings served on the board of directors for the Apollo Group, the parent company of the for-profit University of Phoenix, which paid her more than $300,000.

=== Commission on the Future of Higher Education ===
In September 2005, Spellings announced the formation of the Secretary of Education's Commission on the Future of Higher Education, which has also been referred to as the Spellings Commission. The commission was charged with recommending a national strategy for reforming post-secondary education, with a particular focus on how well colleges and universities were preparing students for the 21st-century workplace. Controversial recommendations included a call for colleges and universities to focus on training students for the workforce and supporting research with commercial applications.

It had a secondary focus on how well high schools were preparing students for post-secondary education. Spellings described the work of the commission as a natural extension into higher education of the reforms carried out under No Child Left Behind, and is quoted as saying: "It's time we turn this elephant around and upside down and take a look at it."

== Post-Government tenure ==
After leaving her role as Secretary of Education, she founded Margaret Spellings & Company, an education consulting firm in Washington, D.C. She was a senior advisor to the Boston Consulting Group and the U.S. Chamber of Commerce. Spellings is currently co-chair of the Future of Tech Commission alongside Jim Steyer of Common Sense Media, an organization that focuses on technology and privacy policy.

=== President of the University of North Carolina (UNC) ===
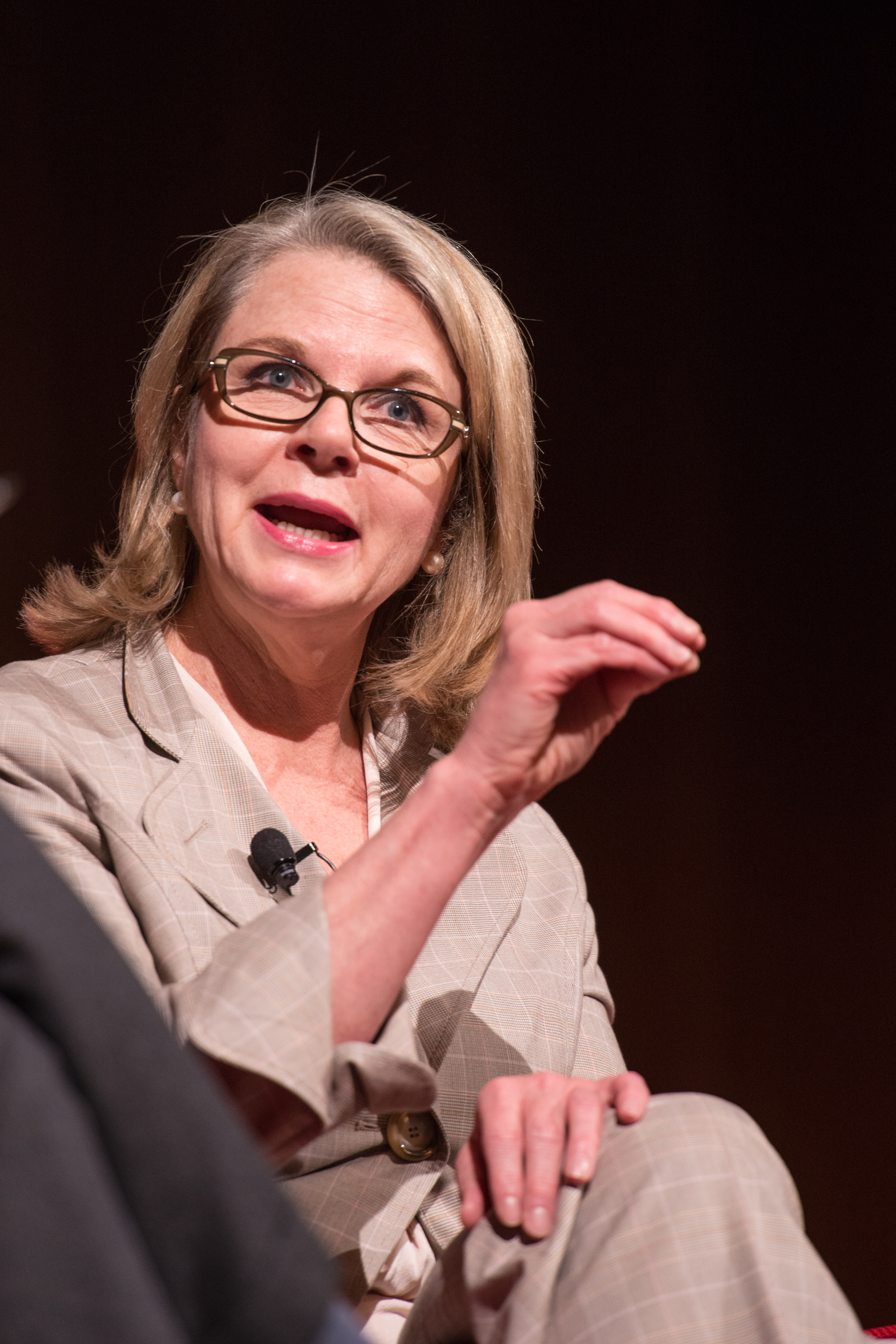
Spellings at the LBJ Presidential Library in 2014

On October 23, 2015, Spellings was elected as the president of the University of North Carolina system by the board of governors, effective March 1, 2016. She succeeded Thomas W. Ross, who was fired by the Board of Governors in a controversial move that some believed was motivated by politics. She is the second woman to serve as president of the University of North Carolina. In her role as president, she oversaw the seventeen constituent institutions that make up the UNC system, each having its own chancellor that serves as the chief executive on the local campus. Her base salary was $775,000.

==== Selection controversy ====
Spellings's election as president of the university was controversial because of the way the secretive search process was conducted. At the Board of Governors meeting at which she was selected, several faculty attempted to read a statement before being escorted out by campus police. Over 100 faculty protestors outside the room shouted loud enough to be heard through the closed doors. According to the protestors, Spellings represented "everything that is troubling in the direction of public higher education in this country." "Faculty leaders said they were ignored during the process." Outgoing President Ross described the environment Spellings was entering as "hostile". On her first day, March 1, 2016, students and faculty walked out of their classes on six campuses. In Chapel Hill, demonstrators gathered on the steps of Wilson Library.

Several board of governors members called on Board Chairman John Fennebresque to resign for what they viewed as a mishandled and secretive search process. Chairman Fennebresque resigned the next business day following Spellings's election. System-wide faculty also offered up criticism of the process, declining to prejudge the new president, but saying that she would need to work hard to overcome the distrust built by the selection process. Controversy surrounding Spellings comes on the back of controversy surrounding the unexplained firing of her predecessor, which some have accused of being politically motivated, though this has been denied by Fennebresque.

==== LGBT issues and Response to House Bill 2 ====
On October 23, 2015, Spellings was heavily criticized for making a comment about members of the LGBT community, suggesting it was a "lifestyle." In addition, many UNC campuses, in early 2016, were plastered with leaflets by discontented students, decrying Spellings as a "corporate educator", among other criticisms, such as her closeness to right-wing political figures.

On April 7, 2016, Spellings sent instructions to all elements of the University of North Carolina system to comply with the controversial new North Carolina law, the Public Facilities Privacy & Security Act (HB2), which requires transgender people to use the bathroom of their birth sex. Spellings said the next day that her instructions to comply did not imply her endorsement of the law. Students around the state protested the law.

On May 4, the U.S. Department of Justice informed Spellings that the University of North Carolina system was in violation of Title IX of the Education Amendments of 1972 because of her previous declaration that she would enforce HB2. On May 31, the News & Observer of Raleigh reported that Spellings reversed her position and said she would not enforce HB2 to avoid a possible loss in federal funding for North Carolina.

==== Removal of Confederate Statue ====
On August 20, 2018, anti-racist protesters toppled the Silent Sam statue at University of North Carolina. Ms. Spellings in a joint statement said that "The actions last evening were unacceptable, dangerous, and incomprehensible." "We are a nation of laws and mob rule and the intentional destruction of public property will not be tolerated."

==== Resignation ====
In October 2018, Spellings announced that she was resigning, effective March 1, 2019.

=== Future of Tech Commission ===
Spelling launched the Future of Tech Commission with Common Sense Media founder Jim Steyer and former Massachusetts Governor Deval Patrick in April 2021. As co-chairs, this commission will compile solutions for a comprehensive tech policy agenda under President Biden and Congress on topics as privacy, antitrust, digital dequity, and content moderation/platform accountability.

== In popular culture ==
Spellings appeared on Celebrity Jeopardy! (episode airing November 21, 2006). She was the first sitting Cabinet member to appear as a contestant on the show. She came in second with a score of $11,100, losing to actor Michael McKean's $38,800. She was the only active member of the Bush Administration to appear on Comedy Central's The Daily Show, as of her appearance on May 22, 2007. She also appeared on The Colbert Report on July 22, 2008. She appeared over the phone on NPR's News Quiz Wait Wait... Don't Tell Me! on March 8, 2008.

== See also ==
- List of female United States Cabinet members

Political offices
Preceded by John Bridgeland	Director of the Domestic Policy Council; 2002–2005	Succeeded by Claude Allen
Preceded by Rod Paige	United States Secretary of Education; 2005–2009	Succeeded by Arne Duncan
U.S. order of precedence (ceremonial)
Preceded by Alphonso Jackson as Former U.S. Cabinet Member	Order of precedence of the United States as Former U.S. Cabinet Member	Succeeded by Mike Johanns as Former U.S. Cabinet Member
