= College Scorecard =

Online tool for comparing American colleges

Default: College Scorecard
- Owner: U.S. Department of Education
- Creator: 18F
- Website: collegescorecard.ed.gov
- Registration: None
- Launched: September 12, 2015; 11 years ago

The College Scorecard is an online tool, created by the United States Department of Education, for consumers to compare the cost and value of higher education institutions in the United States. At launch, it displayed data in five areas: cost, graduation rate, employment rate, average amount borrowed, and loan default rate.

Secretary Arne Duncan explains the College Scorecard

In February 2022, the site was expanded and some data dropped under the Trump Administration was restored. New per-institution data includes post-graduation average income, and percentage of graduates earning more than people with a high school degree.
