= Marshall S. Smith =

American educator (died 2023)

Marshall S. Smith (c. 1937 – May 1, 2023) was an American educator. He held academic positions at Harvard University, the University of Wisconsin at Madison, and Stanford University, where he was Dean of the Stanford University Graduate School of Education. He also held positions in the Gerald Ford, Jimmy Carter, Bill Clinton, and Barack Obama White House administrations.

== Academic career ==
Smith received his undergraduate degree in 1960 from Harvard College and EdD degree in Measurement and Statistics in 1970 from the Harvard Graduate School of Education. Early in his career, Smith co-authored books on computer content analysis and on inequality in the United States and articles on the importance of Head Start and school integration. In the 1980s and 1990s he published research making the case for aligning K-12 education teaching, tests, and textbooks with state standards, pushing for "systemic" reform in US education. His work has been cited as having a "powerful influence" on implementing school accountability measures and performance standards. This included advocating for professional development for teachers over their careers.

Smith served as an associate professor at Harvard University, and full professor at University of Wisconsin at Madison, where he was the director of the Wisconsin Center for Education Research. He then worked as a professor at Stanford University, where he also served as the Dean of the School of Education—a position he held from 1986 to 1993. His work on systemic reform during this period was influential on the then Arkansas Governor Bill Clinton and his future presidential education policies. Smith was an elected member of the National Academy of Education and of the American Academy of Arts and Sciences and a senior fellow at the Carnegie Foundation for the Advancement of Teaching. He was previously the chairman of the board of the American Institutes of Research and he was a former fellow at the Center for Advanced Study in the Behavioral Sciences.

== Public service ==
In the Gerald Ford administration, Smith was the director of policy and budget for the U.S. National Institute of Education. Between 1977 and 1979, Smith was then an assistant commissioner for policy studies in the Office of Education under Ernest Boyer in the Jimmy Carter administration. In this position he helped to develop education legislation targeting school reform. Smith also worked as the chief of staff to the first secretary for education. During the early 1990s Smith was an adviser to the National Education Goals Panel and was a member of the National Council of Education Standards and Testing.

After leading the transition team for K-12 education Smith spent seven years in the Bill Clinton administration as the undersecretary of education and acting deputy secretary of education for the final four years of his tenure. His role included all policy and budget matters, and as acting deputy, he was the second ranked education official in the administration. As a part of his role, he helped author the Goals 2000: Educate America Act, the Improving America's Schools Act, which included a requirement for states to use content standards, and the School-to-Work Opportunities Act. He also spearheaded the development of the Student Loan Reform Act.

Between 2001 and 2009, Smith served as the head of education programs for The William and Flora Hewlett Foundation where he and his team developed and funded Open Education Resources and where he was a proponent of Rice University's Connexions and the Carnegie Mellon Open Learning Initiative, advocating the development of free online tools for American students. Starting in 2009, Smith worked as a senior adviser to U.S. Secretary of Education Arne Duncan in the Barack Obama administration. He also served as the Department of Education's director of international affairs. Between 1995 and 2005, Smith was named one of the top ten most influential figures in American education by Education Week.

== Death ==
Smith died on May 1, 2023, at the age of 85.
