= Palmetto State Teachers Association =

Professional organization for educators in South Carolina, United States

- Founder: Elizabeth Gressette
- Established: 1976
- President: Jeff Maxey
- Executive Director: Kathy Maness
- Budget: Expenses (2019): 1,401,215; Revenue (2019): 1,573,849
- Members: 12,500
- Address: 220 State Street, West Columbia, South Carolina
- Location: South Carolina
- Website: Official website

The Palmetto State Teachers Association ( PSTA) is the largest professional organization for educators in the U.S. state of South Carolina. PSTA was founded in 1976 as a non-profit organization and currently has 12,500 member teachers.

== History ==
The Palmetto State Teachers Association was founded in 1976 by Dr. Elizabeth Gressette, a former kindergarten teacher, who served as the first executive director of the organization. The organization was founded as a splinter group from the South Carolina Education Association (SCEA) shortly following the merger that integrated the white association South Carolina Education Association (SCEA) with Black teacher association Palmetto Education Association (PEA) in 1967 which formed the integrated association now known as the SCEA.

According to Jon Hale, "Already tense over perceptions of being a maligned minority, distrustful white educators formally defected from the NEA. In response to the growing threat of unionization, educators in South Carolina split from the SCEA and formed an alternative association, the Palmetto State Teachers Association (PSTA) in 1976, eight years after the white and black associations merged to form the SCEA." PSTA's original basis for splitting from The SCEA was to sever affiliations with unionization-based policies. The unionization-based policies that PSTA objected to were related to the merger, as "[w]hite educators in the new association contended that the NEA-imposed order to merge and then join the national association violated their rights as educators." Elizabeth Gressette argued that teachers, including herself were pressured into joining organizations like The South Carolina Education Association without a fair choice. The newly-founded PSTA argued for "a restoration of the professional status of teachers and putting the public back in control of its schools and that..educators should be free from all forms of compulsory membership."

PSTA first gained money through the collection of donations and held its first meeting in May of 1976 at Brookland-Cayce High School.

In February 2005, the South Carolina House of Representatives passed an act to commend Gressette for her leadership as executive director of the PSTA, declaring: "under Dr. Gressette’s leadership...the Palmetto State Teachers Association has grown to over six thousand members, with local chapters established throughout the State, as well as student chapters at Winthrop University, the University of South Carolina, Converse, and Columbia College." In February 2005, Kathy Maness succeeded Elizabeth Gressette as the head of the organization.

As of 2019, the organization has approximately 12,500 teachers, accounting for nearly a quarter of the state's public school teachers. In 2022, executive director Kathy Maness announced her candidacy for South Carolina's superintendent of education. Maness was defeated by Ellen Weaver in the Republican runoff on June 28.

== Advocacy ==
Representatives from the PSTA regularly meet with state leaders and legislatures to discuss issues related to education, including teacher shortages, lack of funding, controversial topics, state standards, and mandatory testing. Further, the organization provides benefits to member teachers, including legal assistance up to $3,000,000, legislative representation, scholarships, and professional development. The PSTA sends representatives to all state bodies and agencies responsible for education, including the Senate and House education committees.

== Criticisms ==
Because of the organization's anti-unionization stance, some have labeled PSTA as part of the "New Right" ideology. While the organization is officially non-partisan, its executive director ran for South Carolina's superintendent of education as a Republican, opposing measures such as critical race theory and supporting public school choice.

== See also ==
- Palmetto Education Association
- SC for Ed
- South Carolina Education Association
