= 2026 South Carolina Superintendent of Education election =

- November 3, 2026
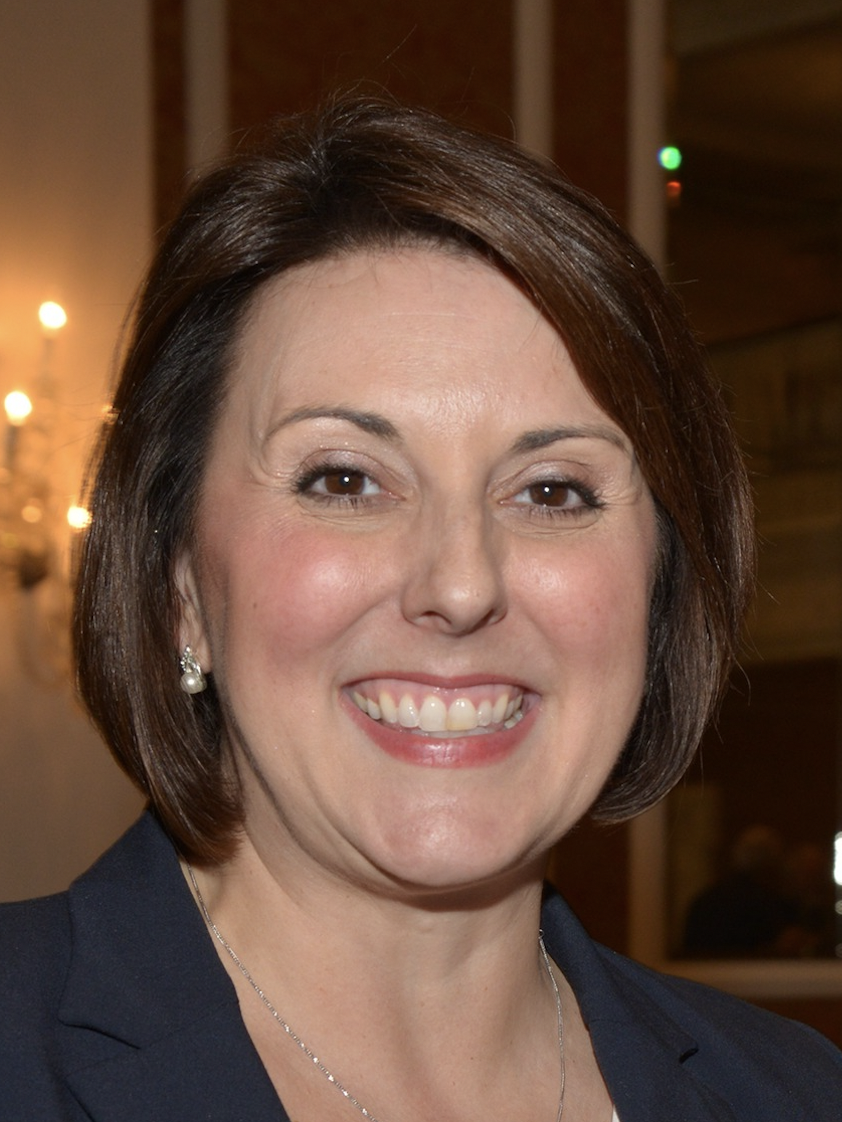

Candidate	Ellen Weaver	Sylvia Wright
Party	Republican	Democratic
Popular vote	1,031,719	975,129
Percentage	51.0%	48.2%
- County results Weaver: 50–60% 60–70% Wright: 40–50% 50–60% 60–70% 70–80%
Superintendent of Education before election
Ellen Weaver
Republican
Elected Superintendent of Education
Ellen Weaver
Republican

The 2026 South Carolina Superintendent of Education election was held on November 3, 2026, to elect the South Carolina Superintendent of Education to a four-year term. Incumbent Republican commissioner Ellen Weaver ran for re-election, defeating Democrat Sylvia Wright in the general election.

== Republican primary ==
=== Candidates ===
==== Nominee ====
- Ellen Weaver, incumbent superintendent

== Democratic primary ==
=== Candidates ===
==== Nominee ====
- Sylvia Wright, educator

==== Eliminated in primary ====
- Lisa Ellis, educator and nominee in 2022

=== Endorsements ===
Lisa Ellis

State legislators

- Jeffrey Graham, state senator from the 35th district (2025–present)
Sylvia Wright

State legislators

- Leon Howard, state representative from the 76th district (1994–present)
- Wendell Jones, state representative from the 25th district (2022–present)
- Deon Tedder, state senator from the 42nd district (2024–present)
- David Weeks, state representative from the 51st district (2000–present)

=== Results ===
Primary results by county: Wright: 50–60%; 60–70%; 70–80%; Ellis: 50–60%

Democratic primary
Party	Candidate	Votes	%
Democratic	Sylvia Wright	218,208	61.0
Democratic	Lisa Ellis	139,391	39.0
Total votes		357,599	100.0

== General election ==
=== Results ===
2026 South Carolina Superintendent of Education election
Party	Candidate	Votes	%	±%
Republican	Ellen Weaver (incumbent)	1,032,516	50.97%	
Democratic	Sylvia Wright	976,406	48.20%	
United Citizens	Baba Amin Ojuok	15,494	0.76%	
Write-in		1,275	0.06%	
Total votes		2,025,691	100.0	
