= Kathy Maness =

American politician

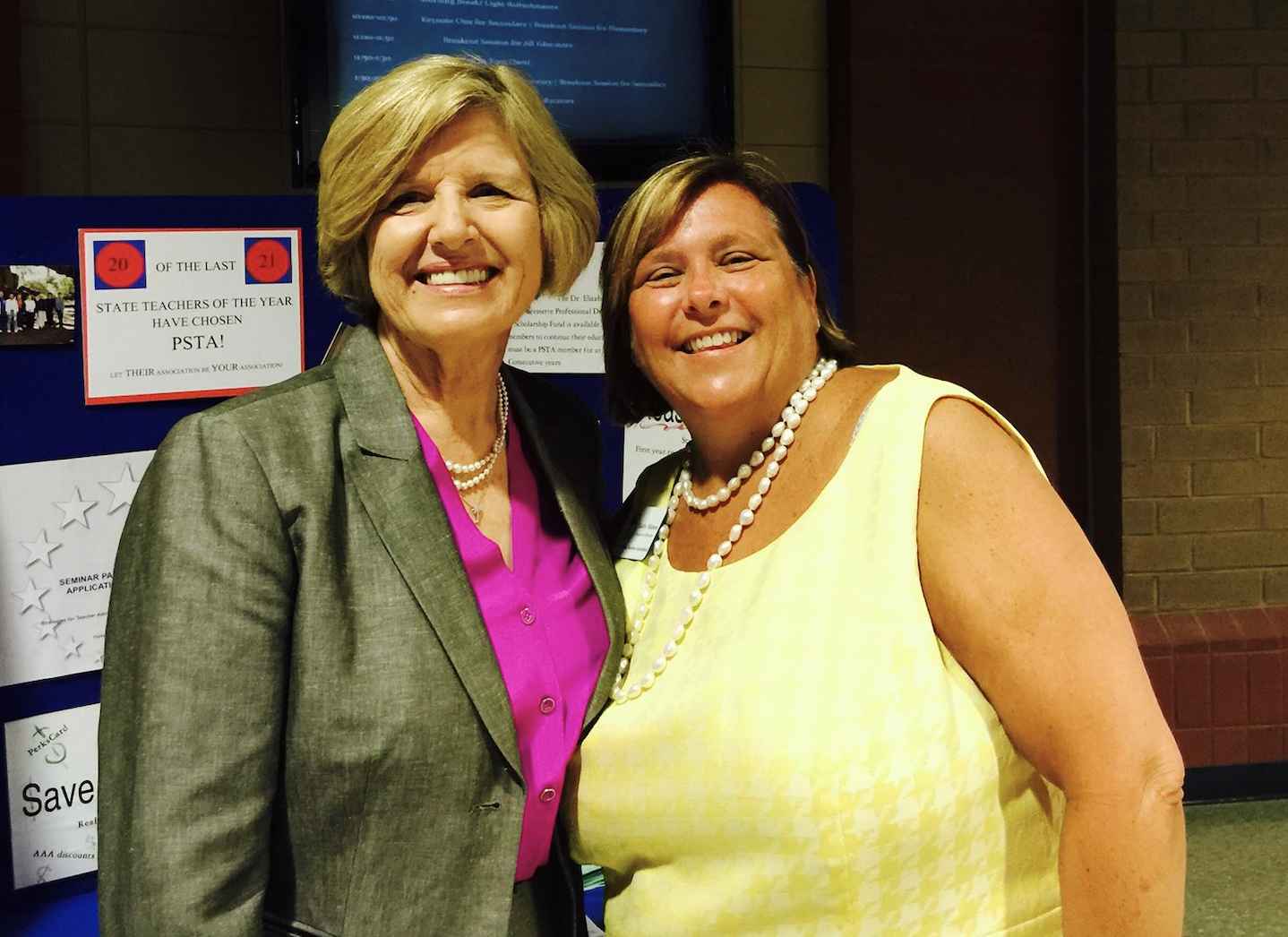
- Molly Spearman (left) and Maness (right)

95th President of the National League of Cities
- In office November 2020 – November 2021
- Preceded by: Joe Buscaino
- Succeeded by: Vince Williams

Personal details
- Born: Kathy Fields; Lancaster, South Carolina, U.S.
- Political party: Republican
- Spouse: Amiel Maness
- Children: 3
- Education: University of South Carolina (BA, MA); Winthrop University

Kathy Maness is an American educator and politician. Maness serves as a member of the town council from Lexington, South Carolina, and has been the executive director of the Palmetto State Teachers Association since February 16, 2005.

== Politics ==
=== Lexington, SC Town Council ===
Maness was first elected to the town council in November 2004, taking office on the following December 1.

In 2020, she was elected as the president of the National League of Cities, succeeding Los Angeles councilman Joe Buscaino. She served a one-year term and was succeeded by the mayor of Tacoma, Washington, Victoria Woodards. Maness currently serves as the Immediate Past President of the National League of Cities. As president, Maness organized a conference to discuss nation-wide advancements in economics, COVID-19 relief, and infrastructure. Speakers included Vice President Kamala Harris and Speaker Nancy Pelosi.

=== Superintendent of Education ===
On June 14, 2022, Maness finished first in the Republican primary for state superintendent for South Carolina's superintendent of education, receiving 31% of the vote. However, since none of the six candidates received 50% of the vote, Maness and Ellen Weaver entered into a runoff two weeks later. Maness was defeated by Ellen Weaver in the runoff.

Maness campaigned against the teaching of Critical race theory, citing it as a "political agenda." Beginning her campaign on Martin Luther King Jr. Day, she said critical race theory was "liberal politicians...trying to use classrooms across the country to undermine Dr. King's dream and focus on the color of skin instead of the content of character." Maness claimed she was the best candidate to alleviate teacher vacancies, reduce class sizes, and increase teacher pay. Outgoing superintendent of education, Molly Spearman, who declined to serve a third term, endorsed Maness. In a video conference, Vice President Kamala Harris and Speaker Nancy Pelosi praised Maness for her leadership as president of the National League of Cities. Weaver used this praise against Maness in an attack campaign, accusing Maness of being "too liberal."

== Electoral history ==
South Carolina Superintendent of Education Republican Primary Election, 2022
| Party | Candidate | Votes | % |
|---|---|---|---|
| Republican | Kathy Maness (Note: Since no candidate received over 50% of the vote, Maness and Weaver faced each other in a runoff election.) | 103,352 | 31% |
| Republican | Ellen Weaver | 78,999 | 23% |
| Republican | Travis Bedson | 47,245 | 14% |
| Republican | Bryan Chapman | 42,512 | 13% |
| Republican | Kizzi Gibson | 37,713 | 11% |
| Republican | Lynda Leventis-Wells | 28,733 | 8% |
| Total votes | | 338,554 | 100% |

South Carolina Superintendent of Education Republican Primary Election Runoff, 2022
| Party | Candidate | Votes | % |
|---|---|---|---|
| Republican | Ellen Weaver | 111,426 | 64% |
| Republican | Kathy Maness | 62,930 | 36% |
| Total votes | | 174,356 | 100% |

== Personal life ==
Maness was born in Lancaster, South Carolina, where her father served as a member of the city council. Maness and her husband have three children. In 1993, she joined the Palmetto State Teachers Association, the largest teacher organization in the state, as a staff member. Currently, she serves as the executive director of the organization.
