= South Carolina Department of Education =

State education agency of the U.S. state of South Carolina

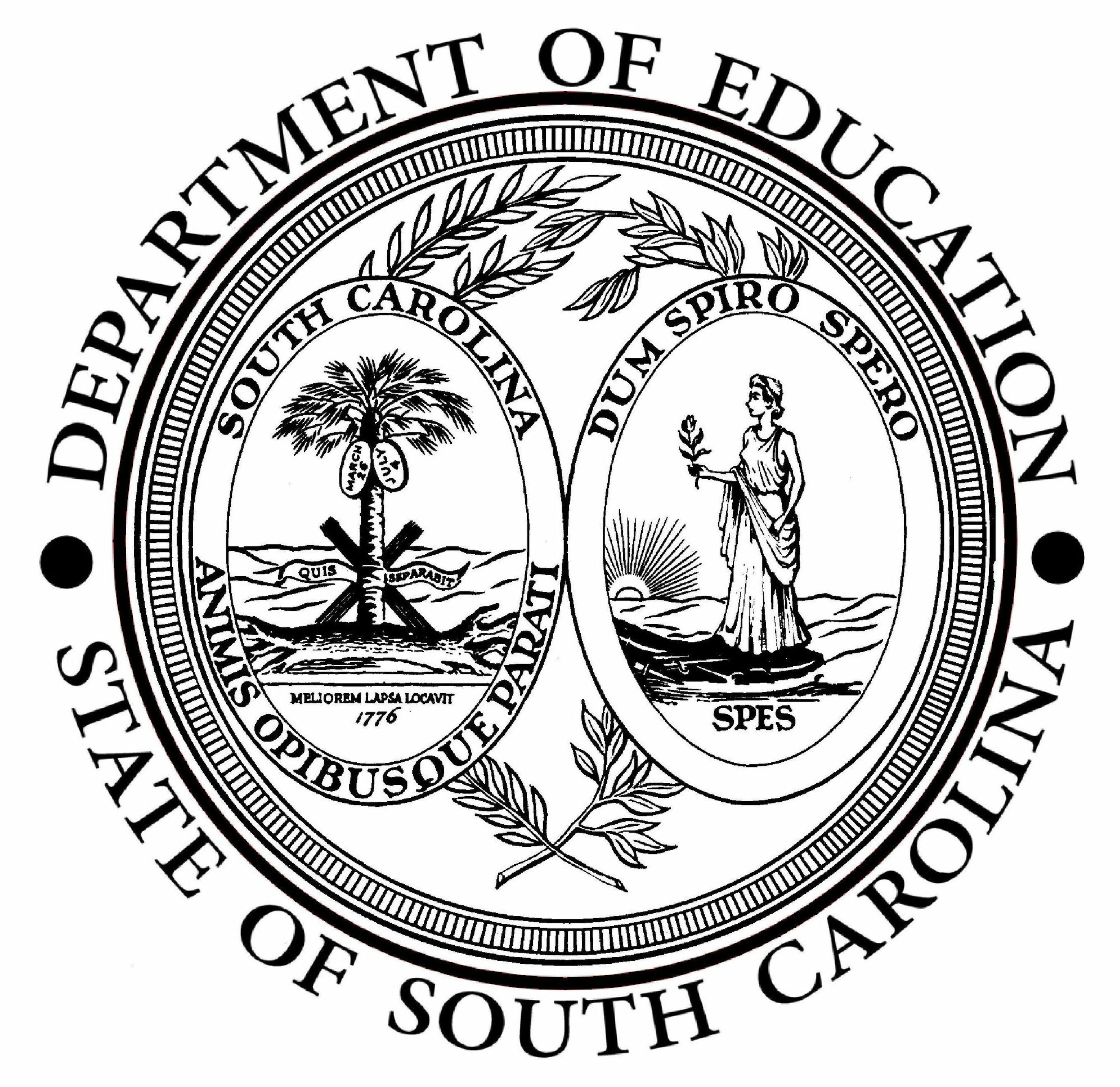
- Seal of the South Carolina Department of Education

Department overview
- Headquarters: 849 Learning Lane, West Columbia, SC 29172
- Annual budget: $1,520,245,510
- Department executive: Ellen Weaver, State Superintendent
- Website: ed.sc.gov

The South Carolina Department of Education is the state education agency of South Carolina. It is headquartered at 849 Learning Lane, West Columbia, SC. The agency is overseen by an elected Superintendent of Education, currently Ellen Weaver.

== Instructional Television ==
The Department of Education's Instructional Television (SCDE ITV) team, part of the South Carolina Office of eLearning, works with South Carolina Educational Television (ETV) to provide resources and services to South Carolina public schools, including instructional television (ITV) for distance learning. ITV is responsible for the selection of video-based resources, the development of local programming to support the state's K–12 curriculum, and the scheduling of approved resources. ETV provides production and technical delivery services to support instructional programming. K-12 and professional development programming are now delivered both by broadcast through the ETV satellite system and online via StreamlineSC. ITV has produced with ETV award-winning series including Project Discovery and Eye Wonder. South Carolina focused resources including Detective Bonz, the SC History Mystery and Idella Bodie's SC Women Series are utilized to support the curriculum.

== Executive Department ==
The state superintendent of education is elected at-large and serves a term of four years.

=== Executive Department positions ===
- Ellen Weaver, State Superintendent
- Betsy Carpentier, Deputy, Division of Data, Technology & Agency Operations
- Cathy Hazelwood, Deputy and General Counsel, Division of Legal Affairs
- John Payne, Deputy, Division of Federal Programs, Accountability & School Improvement
- Virgie Chambers, Deputy, Division of District Operations & Support

== Board of education ==
The South Carolina State Board of Education is composed of one representative from each of the sixteen South Carolina Judicial Circuit Courts. County representatives for each circuit are responsible for electing their circuit's board representative whose term ends after four consecutive years. Any person who is a registered elector in the State and who has taken the oath of office as defined by the Constitution of South Carolina is eligible for board membership.

South Carolina State Board of Education Members
Name	Area	End of Term
Mr. Micheal Brenan	Chair	Serves at will of the governor
Dr. Kristi V. Woodall	Chair-Elect, 16th Circuit (York, Union)	December 31, 2022
Jon Butzon	1st Circuit (Calhoun, Dorchester, Orangeburg)	December 31, 2021
Crystal F. Stepleton	2nd Circuit (Aiken, Bamberg, Barnwell)	December 31, 2023
Dr. Shawn Johnson	3rd Circuit (Clarendon, Lee, Sumter, Williamsburg)	December 31, 2023
Cathy D. Chapman	4th Circuit (Chesterfield, Darlington, Dillon, Marlboro)	December 31, 2022
Dr. Tracy N. West	5th Circuit (Kershaw, Richland)	December 31, 2020
Dr. J. R. Green	6th Circuit (Chester, Fairfield, Lancaster)	December 31, 2021
Carl S. Hinze	7th Circuit (Spartanburg, Cherokee)	December 31, 2022
Dr. Cynthia Downs	8th Circuit (Abbeville, Greenwood, Laurens, Newberry)	December 31, 2021
Lawerence Kobrovsky	9th Circuit (Berkeley, Charleston)	December 31, 2022
Mrs. Debby A. Howard	10th Circuit (Anderson, Oconee)	December 31, 2020
J. Steven English	11th Circuit (Edgefield, Lexington, McCormick, Saluda)	December 31, 2022
Jean W. Pearson	12th Circuit (Florence, Marion)	December 31, 2021
David F. Whittemore, Jr.	13th Circuit (Greenville, Pickens)	December 31, 2019
Valaree C. Smith	14th Circuit (Allendale, Beaufort, Colleton, Hampton, Jasper)	December 31, 2020
Alan Walters	15th Circuit (Georgetown, Horry)	December 31, 2023

== Superintendents ==
Superintendents of Education of the State of South Carolina
No.	Superintendent	Party	Term	Time in office
1	Justus K. Jillson	Republican	1868 - 1876	8 years
2	Hugh Smith Thompson	Democratic	1876 - 1884	8 years
3	Asbury Coward	Democratic	1882 - 1885	4 years
4	James H. Rice	Democratic	1886 - 1890	4 years
5	W. D. Mayfield	Democratic	1890 - 1898	8 years
6	John J. McMahan	Democratic	1898 - 1902	4 years
7	Oscar B. Martin	Democratic	1902 - 1908	6 years
8	John E. Swearingen	Democratic	1908 - 1922	14 years
9	James H. Hope	Democratic	1922 - 1947	25 years
10	Jesse T. Anderson	Democratic	1947 - 1967	20 years
11	Cyril B. Busbee	Democratic	1967 - 1979	12 years
12	Charlie G. Williams	Democratic	1979 - 1991	12 years
13	Barbara S. Nielsen	Republican	1991 - 1999	8 years
14	Inez Tenenbaum	Democratic	1999 - 2007	8 years
15	Jim Rex	Democratic	2007 - 2011	4 years
16	Mick Zais	Republican	2011 - 2015	4 years
17	Molly Spearman	Republican	2015 - 2023	8 years
18	Ellen Weaver	Republican	2023 - Present
