= Phil Rosenfelt =

American lawyer

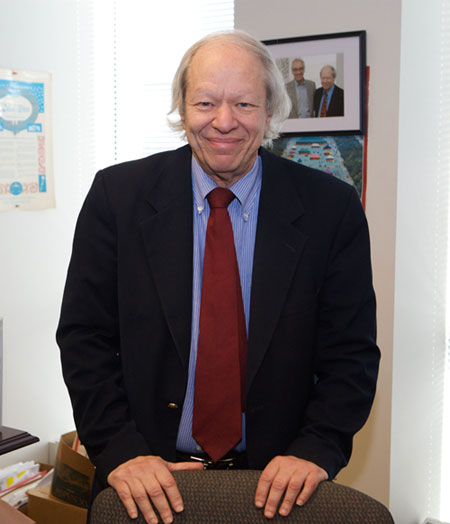

Acting United States Secretary of Education
- In office January 20, 2021 – March 2, 2021
- President: Joe Biden
- Deputy: Denise L. Carter (acting)
- Preceded by: Mick Zais (acting)
- Succeeded by: Miguel Cardona
- In office January 20, 2017 – February 7, 2017
- President: Donald Trump
- Preceded by: John King Jr.
- Succeeded by: Betsy DeVos

Acting General Counsel of the United States Department of Education
- In office January 20, 2017 – April 23, 2018
- President: Donald Trump
- Preceded by: James Cole Jr.
- Succeeded by: Carlos G. Muñiz

Deputy General Counsel of the United States Department of Education for Program Service
- Incumbent
- Assumed office March 2005; Acting: March 2005 – July 2006
- President: George W. Bush; Barack Obama; Donald Trump; Joe Biden; Donald Trump

Personal details
- Born: Paterson, New Jersey, U.S.
- Party: Independent
- Education: University of Pennsylvania (BS); Columbia University (JD); New York University (LLM)

Philip H. Rosenfelt is an American lawyer and civil servant who served as the acting United States Secretary of Education from January 20, 2021 to March 2, 2021. He served in this same position under the Trump administration prior to the Senate confirming Betsy DeVos.

On November 23, 2016, President-elect Donald Trump announced Betsy DeVos to be his designee for Secretary of Education. Prior to DeVos' confirmation by the United States Senate, Rosenfelt was the acting Secretary of Education. Rosenfelt served from January 20, 2017 to February 7, 2017, when DeVos was sworn in.

With the departure of Betsy DeVos at the end of former president Donald Trump's term, Rosenfelt once again assumed the position of acting secretary; this time under the administration of President Joe Biden. Rosenfelt was serving in an acting capacity under Joe Biden's administration until the Senate reviewed the nomination of Miguel Cardona for the position.

== Personal life ==
Born in Paterson, New Jersey, Rosenfelt is of Jewish descent. He received a bachelor of science degree from the University of Pennsylvania, his juris doctor from Columbia University, and his LLM from New York University. He began his service in the federal government in 1971 at the Department of Health, Education, and Welfare.

== Career ==
In 2005, Rosenfelt assumed the position of Deputy General Counsel of the United States Department of Education for Program Service. He served under the administration of George W. Bush. He has continued to serve in that capacity since his appointment.

From January 20, 2017 to April 23, 2018, Rosenfelt served as the acting General Counsel of the United States Department of Education.

He has been designated as the acting United States Secretary of Education on two occasions; the first of these from January 20, 2017 to February 7, 2017, and the second from January 20, 2021 until March 2, 2021. He has been replaced by President Biden's nominee Miguel Cardona as he was confirmed by the Senate.

Currently, Rosenfelt serves as the Deputy General Counsel for Program Service in the Office of the General Counsel at the Department of Education.

Political offices
Preceded by John King Jr.	United States Secretary of Education; Acting; 2017	Succeeded by Betsy DeVos
Preceded by Mick Zais; Acting	United States Secretary of Education; Acting; 2021	Succeeded by Miguel Cardona
