= 1882 South Carolina gubernatorial election =

- November 7, 1882
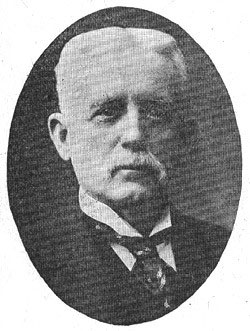

Nominee	Hugh Smith Thompson	J. Hendrix McLane
Party	Democratic	Greenback
Alliance	-	Republican
Popular vote	67,158	17,719
Percentage	79.00%	20.84%
- County results Thompson: 50–60% 60–70% 70–80% 80–90% 90–100% McLane: 70–80%
Governor before election
Johnson Hagood
Democratic
Elected Governor
Hugh Smith Thompson
Democratic

The 1882 South Carolina gubernatorial election was held on November 7, 1882 to select the governor of the state of South Carolina. Hugh Smith Thompson was nominated by the Democrats and ran against J. Hendrix McLane, a Greenback-Labor candidate. Thompson easily won the general election and became the 81st governor of South Carolina.

== Democratic Convention ==
=== Candidates ===
- John Bratton, Comptroller General
- John Kennedy, Lieutenant Governor
- Hugh Smith Thompson, Superintendent of Education

==== Declined ====
- Johnson Hagood, incumbent Governor
- Wade Hampton, former Governor
- George D. Tillman, U.S. Representative

=== Campaign ===
Governor Johnson Hagood chose not to seek reelection in 1882 and two former generals in the Confederate Army emerged as the frontrunners, Lieutenant Governor John Kennedy and Comptroller General John Bratton. Both men were loyal followers of Wade Hampton, neither had supported Martin Witherspoon Gary, and both were dedicated Democrats. However, many in the state wanted a new direction and the candidacy of George D. Tillman quickly gained pace. Others feared that an intra-party fight over the nomination would bring back Radical Republican rule and only the return of Senator Hampton could save the party. Even so, both Tillman and Hampton declined and chose to continue their representation in the Congress.

Hugh Smith Thompson, the state Superintendent of Education since 1876, had declined to be a candidate for governor and instead lobbied for the presidency of South Carolina College. However, with the opening of the state Democratic convention in August, Thompson was nominated for governor alongside Kennedy and Bratton. After the second ballot with momentum in Thompson's favor, both Kennedy and Bratton withdrew their names thus allowing Thompson to be the Democrats nominee for the general election.

=== Results ===
Democratic nomination for Governor
Candidate	1st Ballot	2nd Ballot
Hugh Smith Thompson	112	147
John Doby Kennedy	107	90
John Bratton	95	75

== Greenback-Labor Convention ==
Following their disastrous defeat in the gubernatorial election of 1880, the Greenback-Labor party members met with state Republican leaders to fuse and offer a joint ticket for the general election. In a January interview with the News and Courier, McLane stated that the Greenbacks would get 150,000 votes in the general election and sweep the statewide offices.

A convention for the Greenbacks was held in Columbia with over one hundred delegates from 22 counties, even including a Democratic state senator. McLane was nominated for the governorship and candidates were fielded for six of the seven congressional districts, the seventh district being a heavily black district held by the Republicans.

The platform outlined by the Greenbacks for the election was:

- Congress to issue legal greenbacks.
- Condemning government bonds.
- Denouncing the lien law, stock law, and the election law.

== General election ==
The general election was held on November 7, 1882 and Hugh Smith Thompson was elected as governor of South Carolina with nominal opposition. Turnout was less than the previous gubernatorial election because of the increasingly uncompetitive nature of the election in South Carolina.

1882 South Carolina Gubernatorial Election
Party	Candidate	Votes	%	±%
Democratic	Hugh Smith Thompson	67,158	79.00%	▼17.4%
Greenback	J. Hendrix McLane	17,719	20.84%	▲17.3%
No party	Write-Ins	134	0.16%	▲0.1%
Majority		49,439	58.16%	▼34.7%
Turnout		85,011		
Democratic hold				

== See also ==
- Governor of South Carolina
- List of governors of South Carolina
- South Carolina gubernatorial elections

Preceded by 1880	South Carolina gubernatorial elections	Succeeded by 1884
