= Ellen Weaver =

American politician (born 1979)

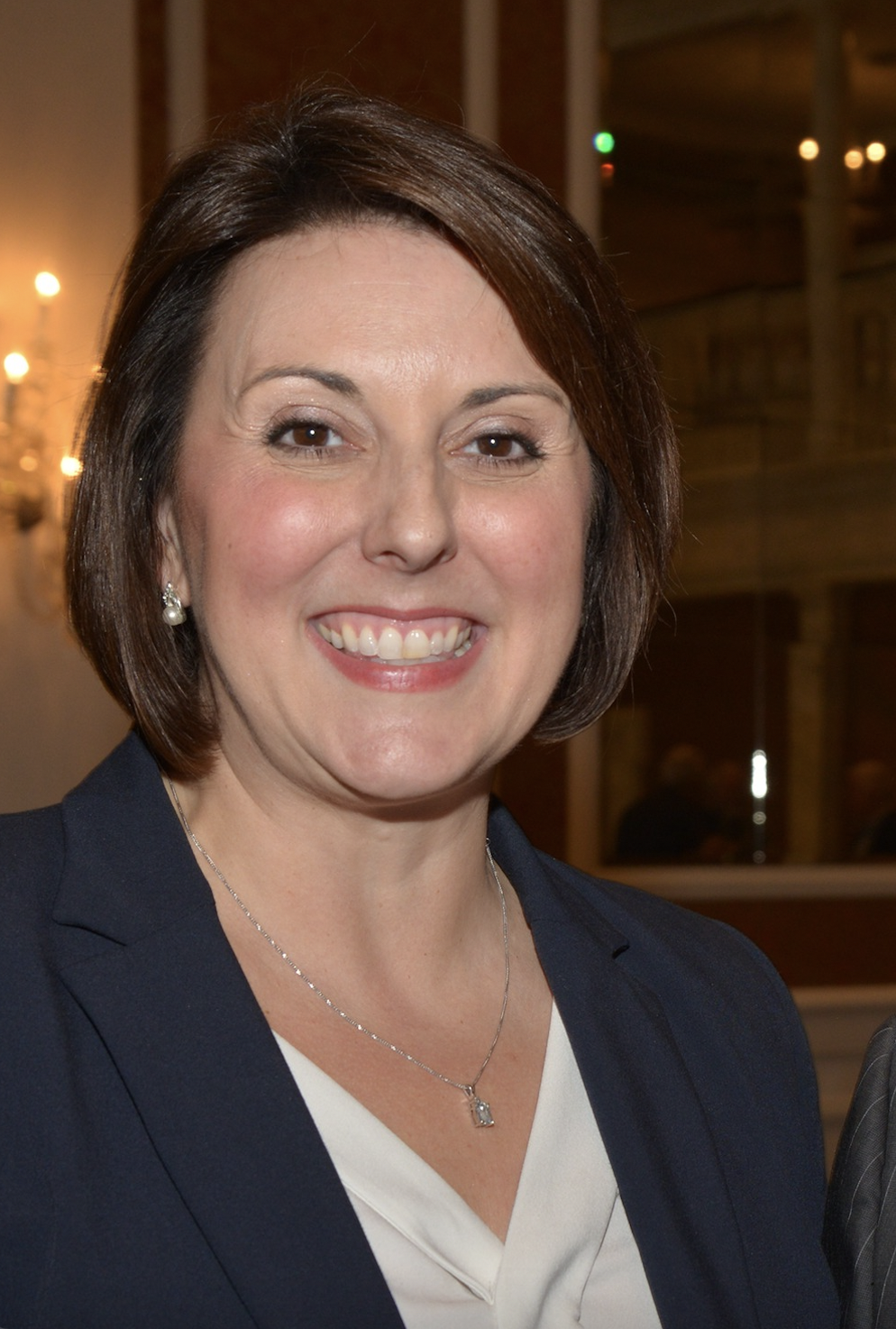

South Carolina Superintendent of Education
- Incumbent
- Assumed office January 11, 2023
- Governor: Henry McMaster
- Preceded by: Molly Spearman

Personal details
- Born: March 26, 1979 (age 47) South Carolina, U.S.
- Party: Republican
- Education: Bob Jones University (BA, MS)

Ellen Weaver (born March 26, 1979) is an American Republican politician and former conservative think-tank leader who has served as South Carolina Superintendent of Education since January 11, 2023. She defeated Democratic candidate and current school activities director Lisa Ellis in the general election in November 2022. She is the former president and CEO of the Palmetto Promise Institute, a conservative think tank in South Carolina which supports public funding of private schools. Weaver has focused her tenure as Superintendent on literacy, education freedom, and parental empowerment.

== Personal life ==
Weaver attended a private Christian school until fifth grade, and then was homeschooled by her mother until eleventh grade. She attended a public high school for her last two years of secondary education. Weaver graduated from Bob Jones University in Greenville, South Carolina. She worked for Senator Jim DeMint. Weaver, along with Senator DeMint, founded the Palmetto Promise Institute, a conservative think tank. Weaver served as the president of the institution until her election. The group's current president and CEO, Wendy Damron, donated a total of $1,500 to Weaver's campaign, according to State Ethics filings. Weaver served as an appointed member of the Education Oversight Committee for the South Carolina General Assembly. Weaver served as the founder and chief executive officer of Palmetto Promise Institute.

== Political career ==
Weaver was appointed to the South Carolina Education Oversight Committee in 2016 through 2022, becoming the chair of the organization in February 2019. She held the position for two years until 2021, though she remains on the board in an ex officio capacity. She succeeded Neil Robinson in 2019, who succeeded her in 2022.

In 2022, Weaver declared her candidacy for South Carolina's superintendent of education, to succeed Republican Molly Spearman, who did not seek a third term. Her endorsements included Senator Tim Scott, former U.S. ambassador of the United Nations and former South Carolina governor, Nikki Haley former Senator Jim DeMint, and former U.S. Secretary of Education Mick Zais. When it was discovered that Weaver does not hold a master's degree, a requirement to serve as state superintendent of education, Weaver announced she would have the degree by October 2022. She received a master's degree in Educational Leadership from Bob Jones University.

In the Republican primary, Kathy Maness placed first with 31% of the vote with Weaver in second place at 23% of the vote. Because no candidate received 50% of the vote, a runoff election was held two weeks later. During the primary runoff campaign, Weaver accused her challenger, Kathy Maness, of not being conservative enough to serve as an elected Republican. Weaver said, "we have a clear choice between a proven America-first conservative and my opponent, whose face could be on Wikipedia next to Republican in Name Only." Weaver defeated Maness in the Republican primary runoff on June 28, 2022. In the general election, she defeated Democratic and Alliance party candidate Lisa Ellis. Ellen Weaver became the 19th South Carolina superintendent of education on January 11, 2023.

=== Superintendent of Education ===
In August 2023, Weaver ended the Department of Education's 50-year partnership with the South Carolina Association of School Librarians (SCASL). In an August 25 letter to the association, Weaver cited its "hyperbolic rhetoric that politicizes these important issues" and criticized SCASL for labeling parental efforts to ensure materials are age-appropriate as "bans" and "censorship", stating the group demonstrated a "continued lack of discernment on this foundational issue".

In June 2024, the South Carolina Department of Education dropped AP African American Studies from the list of offered courses in South Carolina. The department cited "significant controversy" surrounding the course over issues addressed by a state budget proviso and pending legislation.

The South Carolina State Board of Education unanimously passed Regulation 43–170, titled the "Uniform Procedure for Selection or Reconsideration of Instructional Materials", which was set to take effect upon publication in the July 2024 State Register. The regulation established a statewide process to remove materials containing descriptions or visual depictions of "sexual conduct" from public school classrooms and libraries. While Department memoranda designated it as the State Board's regulation, television station WIS termed the measure "Weaver's policy". Following an October 2025 vote by the Board to remove ten additional books, the ACLU of South Carolina reported that 21 titles had been removed statewide and one restricted to parental consent, while WCIV described 22 books as banned.

On October 7, 2025, SCASL and three public school students filed a federal lawsuit against Weaver under the First and Fourteenth Amendments (SCASL v. Weaver, No. 2:25-cv-12857-DCN). The complaint challenged Regulation 43–170 alongside a March 14, 2025 memorandum issued by Weaver barring 14 concepts from Department materials. In May 2026, the plaintiffs amended their complaint to add members of the State Board as co-defendants; the litigation remains ongoing as of October 2026.

=== Beliefs ===
In the 2022 debate for state superintendent of education, Weaver stated that she rejects the "woke ideology" of Kimberlé Crenshaw and Ibram X. Kendi. During her campaign, Weaver argued that parents, not teachers, maintain the right to guide their children through mental, physical, and health-related decisions. Weaver is a strong advocate of education freedom and supports providing education scholarship accounts to help parents choose the educational environment that best suits their individual child.

Weaver has associated herself with the group Moms for Liberty, speaking at a panel during their Summer 2023 "Joyful Warriors" conference and tweeting, "I'm always proud to stand with parents. @Moms4Liberty."

== Electoral history ==
2022 South Carolina Superintendent of Education Republican primary
Party	Candidate	Votes	%
Republican	Kathy Maness	103,608	30.6%
Republican	Ellen Weaver	79,077	23.3%
Republican	Travis Bedson	47,241	13.9%
Republican	Bryan Chapman	42,498	12.5%
Republican	Kizzi Gibson	37,743	11.1%
Republican	Lynda Leventis-Wells	28,755	8.5%
Total votes		338,922	100.0%

2022 South Carolina Superintendent of Education Republican primary runoff
Party	Candidate	Votes	%
Republican	Ellen Weaver	111,643	63.9%
Republican	Kathy Maness	63,080	36.1%
Total votes		174,723	100.0%

2022 South Carolina Superintendent of Education election
Party	Candidate	Votes	%
Republican	Ellen Weaver	937,493	55.5%
Democratic	Lisa Ellis (Note: Ellis ran as both a candidate for the Democratic and Alliance parties. Her vote total is a combination of votes cast for both parties.)	722,013	42.8%
Green	Patricia Mickel	27,468	1.6%
Write-in		1,744	0.1%
Total votes		1,688,718	100%
Republican hold			

== Notes ==
Party political offices
Preceded by Molly Spearman	Republican nominee for South Carolina Superintendent of Education; 2022	Most recent
Political offices
Preceded by Molly Spearman	South Carolina Superintendent of Education; 2023–present	Incumbent
