= Palmetto Education Association =

The Palmetto Education Association was a professional association and teachers' union representing teachers in all-black schools (at that time were referred to as "colored schools") in South Carolina during racial segregation in the United States.

== Prelude ==
One of the mandates of Reconstruction placed on the former Confederate states was that each had to write a new constitution acceptable to Congress before rejoining the Union. South Carolina convened a Constitutional Convention in 1868. Since twenty-one of South Carolina's thirty-one counties were majority African-American, black delegates outnumbered white delegates seventy-six to forty-eight. As a result, the new Constitution did not reflect the traditional desires of the white power structure. The Constitution not only outlawed slavery, it "abolished imprisonment for debt, authorized universal male suffrage, gave the state its first divorce law" and, most significantly, established a "public school system for poor and rich, black and white." Even after Reconstruction ended, free public education for African-Americans was not to be denied, although drastic cuts to funding and the abolishment of a law granting extra funds to poorer districts would come in 1878. State Superintendent of Education Hugh S. Thompson wrote that one of the greatest hazards to the state’s recovery was the "ignorance of a large number of our people.", and he proposed creating teacher-training schools. What would start as week-long or seasonal "Institutes for Colored Teachers" between 1880 and 1882 would become full normal training schools within a few years.

== Foundation and growth ==
Professional associations for teachers also grew out of the temporary institutes. First, the white-only South Carolina State Teachers Association in 1881, and in 1900, the Palmetto Education Association. The first president was J. Edward Wallace, who like all of the early presidents of the Association worked as a school administrator rather than as a teacher. Perhaps the most influential early leader was J.L. Cain, president from 1914 to 1922. Under his leadership, "it grew rapidly in membership and influence." In 1920, there were 393 dues-paying members. By 1923, that had nearly doubled to 659 and would ultimately peak at 8,429 in 1964, with 37 counties reporting 100% membership among their teachers.

In 1918, the first constitution was drafted, the first executive director was employed, and issuance was made for the first annual publication. According to the constitution, the organization's three purposes were:

1. To improve its members in the science and art of teaching.
2. To dignify and promote public interest in the cause of education.
3. To elevate the standards of the teaching profession and improve the Negro race educationally.

Under the guidance of the association, the quality of teachers in Colored schools in South Carolina improved at an amazing pace. In 1925, less than 2% of the state's African-American teachers were certified. By 1937, 75% were certified. Along with this came an increased presence in the state's white-dominated power structure, and State Superintendents of Education asked the Association to "standardize Negro schools and colleges."

In 1919, South Carolina and the PEA hosted the annual convention of the American Teachers Association, then known as the National Association of Teachers of Colored Schools. From 1930 on, this partnership was made official, with the PEA as advocates at the state level and the NATCS at the national level.

== Brown v Board of Education and merger with the SCEA ==
In 1954, the Supreme Court ruled that segregation in education was unconstitutional. This began a long process that saw the American Teachers Association, parent organization of the PEA, merge with the National Education Association in 1966. On April 1, 1967, the House of Delegates of the Palmetto Education Association voted to merge with the South Carolina Education Association, which continues to operate as an educational advocacy organization.
