= Columbia Male Academy =

School in Columbia, South Carolina, US

Columbia Male Academy and Columbia Female Academy were schools in Columbia, South Carolina. South Carolina governor John Taylor donated land for the private school. Hugh S. Thompson served as a principal. The state legislature appointed trustees in 1792 and the school was incorporated in 1795. A female academy was also established. The school was merged with the public school system in 1883. A historical marker commemorates its history.
