= Van Hipp Jr. =

American politician (born 1960)

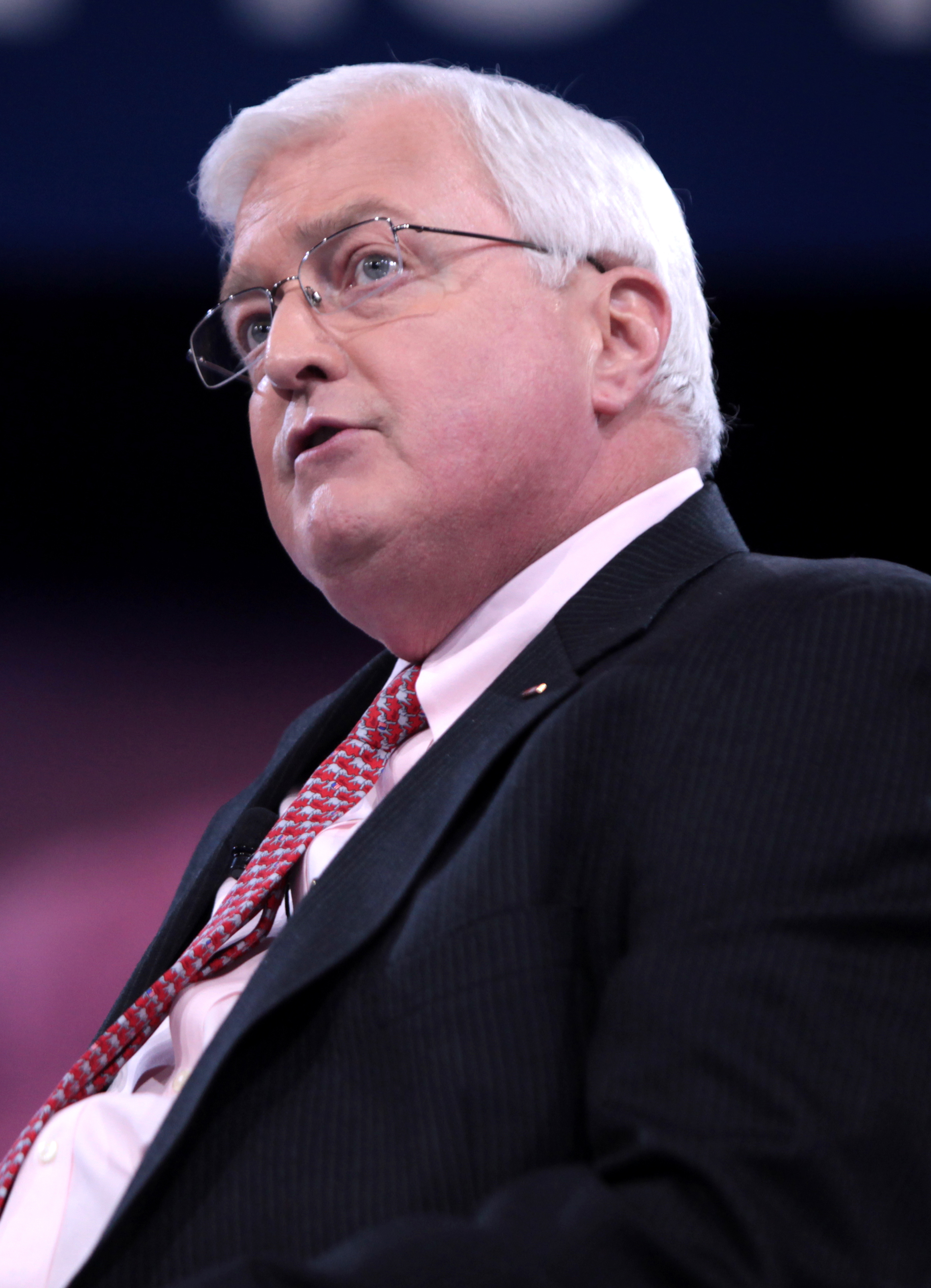
- Hipp in 2016

Chairman of the South Carolina Republican Party
- In office May 1987 – May 1989
- Preceded by: Dr. George G. Graham
- Succeeded by: Barry S. Wynn

Personal details
- Born: June 9, 1960 (age 66)
- Party: Republican
- Education: Wofford College (BA), University of South Carolina School of Law (JD)
- Awards: Bronze Star Medal

Military service
- Allegiance: United States
- Branch/service: United States Army
- Battles/wars: First Gulf War: Operation Desert Storm; Operation Restore Democracy

Van D. Hipp Jr. is a former chairman of the South Carolina Republican Party, serving from 1987 to 1989. He is chairman of American Defense International, Inc. (ADI), a Washington, D.C.–based consulting firm specializing in government affairs, business development and public relations. Hipp is the author of the book The New Terrorism: How to Fight It and Defeat It, published February 2015. One hundred percent of all proceeds go to scholarships for the children of fallen Guardsmen and is being administered by the National Guard Educational Foundation (NGEF).

== Life ==
He currently serves on the board of directors of the American Conservative Union and The National Capitol Board of The Salvation Army. He is also on the board of the Palmetto Promise Institute and is a member of the Committee on the Present Danger.

Hipp is married to the former Jane Grote of Nashville, Tennessee, and they have three children: Trey, Sarah Camille, and Jackson. Hipp and his family split their time between Alexandria, Virginia, and Georgetown, South Carolina.

== Career ==
From 1987 to 1989, Hipp served as the chairman of the South Carolina Republican Party. In 1988, Hipp served as a member of the Presidential Electoral College, and as a speaker at the Republican National Convention, he introduced former speaker of the house, Newt Gingrich.

In 1990, Hipp was sworn in as Deputy Assistant Secretary of the Army (Reserve Forces and Mobilization). In this capacity, he served as the Army Secretariat's "point man" for the successful mobilization, and then demobilization, of the army's reserve forces for Operation Desert Shield/Storm.

Following the Tailhook scandal, Hipp was named by U.S. Secretary of Defense Dick Cheney to be the principal deputy general counsel of the navy. As the navy's number-two lawyer, Hipp's responsibilities involved all aspects of legal interest to the navy, including government contracts, ethics, environmental and counter-narcotics law. Hipp served in this capacity until January 1993.

Hipp ran unsuccessfully for South Carolina's 1st congressional district in 1994, losing the Republican primary to Mark Sanford.

Hipp is a veteran of the U.S. Army and served on active duty in both Operation Desert Storm and Operation Restore Democracy. He is a recipient of the Bronze Star Medal. He continues to speak on defense issues at public forums across the country, and his articles on defense and international policy have been widely read in the national print media.

Since the September 11th attacks on the United States, Hipp has appeared on the Fox News Channel well over 500 times as an expert commentator on the war on terror and has been a guest on virtually all of the network's major news programming including The O'Reilly Factor and Hannity & Colmes. In addition, he has appeared on MSNBC, including Hardball with Chris Matthews and Scarborough Country, CNN with Paula Zahn and Daybreak, the London-based Sky News Channel, and the CBS Evening News. He formerly served on the President's Council of the National Safe Skies Alliance. In 2002, Hipp was named by then Governor Jim Hodges (D-SC) as South Carolina Ambassador for Economic Development. In 2011, Hipp was instrumental in organizing the Commander-in-Chief Debate at Wofford College, the first foreign policy and national security Republican presidential debate, which was sponsored by CBS News and National Journal. He is the past Chairman of the Salvation Army Board of Advisors in Alexandria, Virginia, and currently serves as a member of the Board of Visitors of Charleston Southern University.In addition, he was the recipient of the Salvation Army National Capital Area Command's 2015 Compassionate Citizen Award. On November 3, 2016, he presented a lecture entitled "The Greatest Challenge Of Our Next President: Keeping America Safe During These Times" at the Gerald R. Ford Presidential Museum in Grand Rapids, Michigan.

Hipp received his bachelor's degree in Economics from Wofford College in 1982, and is a past President of the National Alumni Association. He also endowed the Hipp Lecture Series, which has featured speakers such as Michael Reagan, son of President Ronald Reagan and President-Elect Donald Trump.

Hipp received his Juris Doctor from the University of South Carolina School of Law. In 1990, Van was the recipient of Wofford College's National Young Alumnus of the Year Award, and in 2014, he was the recipient of Wofford College's Distinguished Service Award. In the fall, Hipp is the sideline reporter for Wofford College Football, which plays in the Southern Conference (SOCON) of the NCAA FCS.
