= Hugh Smith Thompson =

American politician (1836–1904)

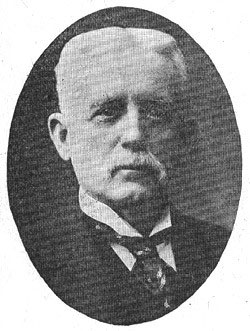

81st Governor of South Carolina
- In office December 1, 1882 – July 10, 1886
- Lieutenant: John Calhoun Sheppard
- Preceded by: Johnson Hagood
- Succeeded by: John Calhoun Sheppard

South Carolina Superintendent of Education
- In office December 14, 1876 – December 1, 1882
- Governor: Wade Hampton III; William Dunlap Simpson; Thomas Bothwell Jeter; Johnson Hagood
- Preceded by: Justus K. Jillson
- Succeeded by: Asbury Coward

Personal details
- Born: January 24, 1836 Charleston, South Carolina, US
- Died: November 20, 1904 (aged 68) New York City, US
- Party: Democratic
- Spouse: Elizabeth Clarkson
- Children: 1
- Education: South Carolina Military Academy (The Citadel)
- Profession: Soldier, educator, politician

Hugh Smith Thompson (January 24, 1836 – November 20, 1904) was the 81st governor of South Carolina, from 1882 to 1886.

== Career as an educator ==
Born in Charleston, Thompson graduated from the South Carolina Military Academy (now The Citadel) in 1856 and was an instructor at the Arsenal Academy from 1858 to 1861. Leading a battalion of Citadel cadets on January 9, 1861, they fired the first shots of the American Civil War when they opened fire on the Union ship Star of the West which was entering Charleston's harbor. For the remainder of the war, he served as an instructor of the cadets at the Citadel Academy.

At the end of hostilities in 1865, Thompson became the principal of Columbia Male Academy until 1880. In 1876, he was nominated by the state Democrats for the position of Superintendent of Education which he won upon the resolution of the controversial gubernatorial election in the favor of Wade Hampton and the Democrats. He was reelected in 1878 and 1880 without opposition. In 1882, Thompson lobbied for the presidency of South Carolina College. However, he emerged as a dark horse candidate for governor after the split of the state Democrats between John Bratton and John Doby Kennedy. After the second ballot at the nominating convention, both Bratton and Kennedy withdrew their names and Thompson became the Democratic candidate for the gubernatorial election of 1882.

== Term as governor and federal offices ==
Thompson easily won the general election against J. Hendrix McLane and became the 81st governor of South Carolina. He was reelected without opposition in the gubernatorial election of 1884. His time as governor was marked by the stability of the state, and unity within the Democratic party. Upon being appointed in 1886 by President Grover Cleveland to be Assistant Secretary of the Treasury, Thompson resigned as governor. In 1889, he became the commissioner of the U.S. Civil Service Commission after appointment by President Benjamin Harrison. He retired from public service in 1892, and for over a decade was the comptroller of the New York Life Insurance Company.

== Death ==
On November 20, 1904, Thompson died in New York City and was buried at Trinity Episcopal churchyard in Columbia.

Party political offices
Preceded by Johnson Hagood	Democratic nominee for Governor of South Carolina; 1882, 1884	Succeeded by John Peter Richardson III
Political offices
Preceded by Johnson Hagood	Governor of South Carolina; 1882–1886	Succeeded by John Calhoun Sheppard
