= Cindy Marten =

American educator and government official

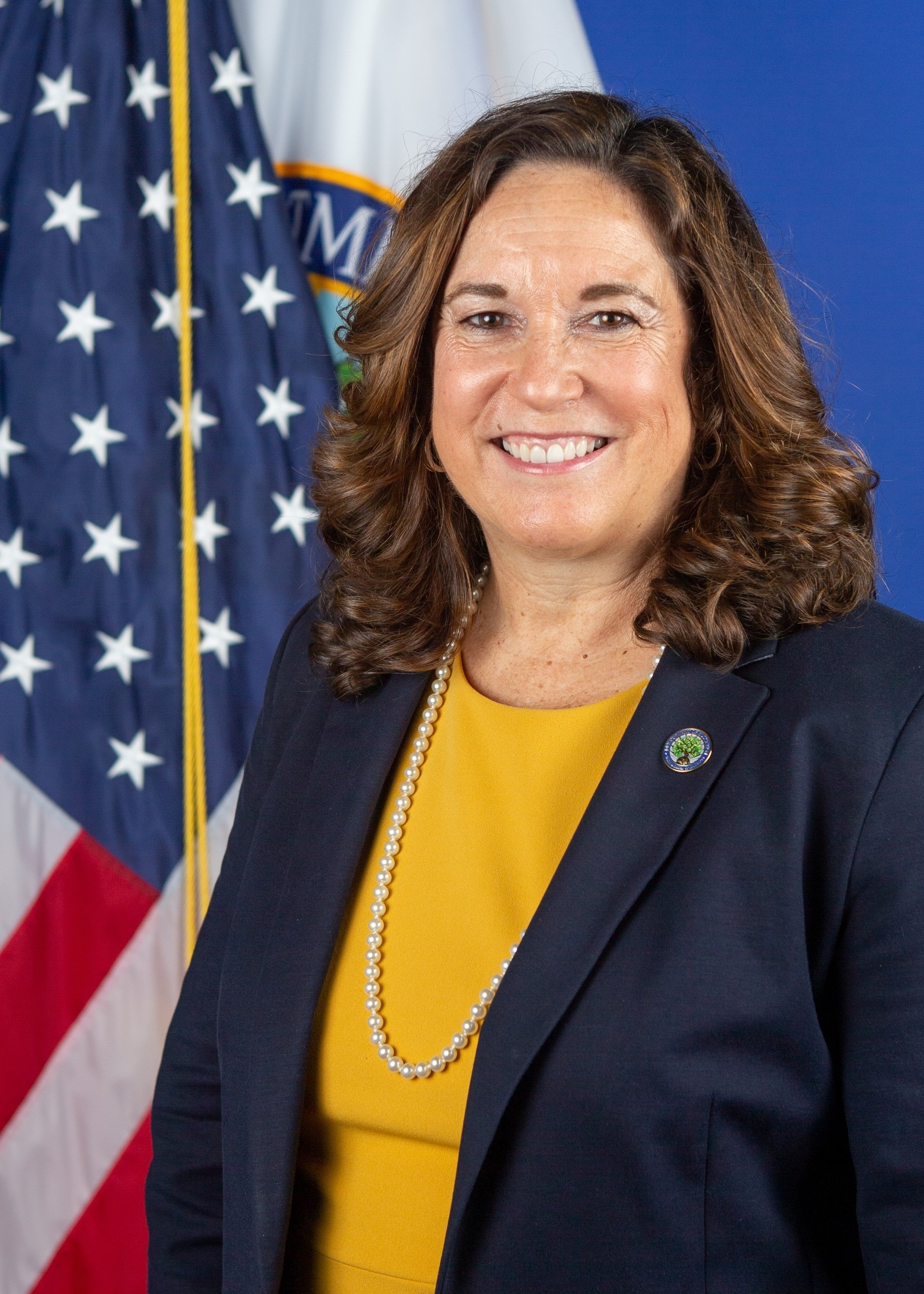

Secretary of the Delaware Department of Education
- Incumbent
- Assumed office January 21, 2025
- Governor: Matt Meyer
- Preceded by: Mark Holodick

11th United States Deputy Secretary of Education
- In office May 18, 2021 – January 20, 2025
- President: Joe Biden
- Preceded by: Mick Zais
- Succeeded by: Richard Smith (acting)

Superintendent of San Diego Unified School District
- In office February 27, 2013 – May 12, 2021
- Preceded by: Bill Kowba
- Succeeded by: Lamont Jackson

Personal details
- Born: Cynthia Minette Marten
- Education: University of Wisconsin, La Crosse (BS); University of California, San Diego (MEd)

Cynthia Minette Marten is an American educator and government official who served as the 11th United States deputy secretary of education from 2021 to 2025. Marten previously served as the superintendent of San Diego Unified School District from 2013 until her confirmation as deputy secretary in May 2021.

== Education ==
Marten earned a bachelor's degree in education from the University of Wisconsin–La Crosse and master's degree in teaching and learning from the University of California, San Diego.

== Career ==
Marten spent 32 years as an educator, holding various roles of increasing responsibility as a teacher, literacy specialist, vice principal, and principal. For 10 years she worked at Central Elementary School in City Heights. As a teacher, instructional leader, and later as principal, she placed an emphasis on social and emotional learning and the arts, combined with academics.

In 2013, Marten became the superintendent of San Diego Unified School District. She was succeeded by Lamont Jackson, who held the position until August 2024.

Marten's nomination by President Joe Biden to be deputy secretary of education was submitted to the United States Senate on February 22, 2021, and confirmed by the Senate on May 11, 2021, by a 54–44 vote.

Governor-elect Matt Meyer nominated Marten to become Secretary of the Delaware Department of Education in January 2025.

== Selected works ==
- Marten, Cindy (2003). Word Crafting: Teaching Spelling, Grades K-6. Pearson Education Canada. ISBN 978-0-325-00322-1.

Political offices
Preceded by Denise L. Carter; Acting	United States Deputy Secretary of Education; 2021–2025	Succeeded by Richard Smith; Acting
