= 1880 South Carolina gubernatorial election =

- November 2, 1880
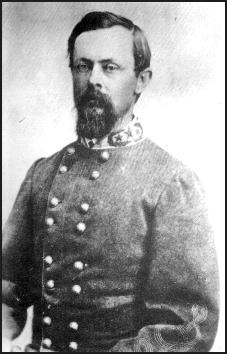
Nominee	Johnson Hagood	L. W. R. Blair
Party	Democratic	Greenback
Alliance	-	Republican
Popular vote	117,432	4,277
Percentage	96.41%	3.51%
- County results Hagood: 60–70% 80–90% 90–100%
Governor before election
Wade Hampton III
Democratic
Elected Governor
Johnson Hagood (governor)
Democratic

Johnson Hagood

The 1880 South Carolina gubernatorial election was held on November 2, 1880 to select the governor of South Carolina. Johnson Hagood was nominated by the Democrats and ran against L. W. R. Blair, a Greenback-Labor candidate. Hagood easily won the general election and became the 80th governor of South Carolina.

== Democratic Convention ==
In 1880, the state Democratic Party was split between the supporters of Wade Hampton and Martin Witherspoon Gary, although Hampton clearly commanded the respect and admiration of the party faithful. Therefore, to thwart a bid by Gary for the governorship, the state executive committee on March 10 announced that the state nominating convention would be held on June 1, a couple months before the anticipated date in August. Gary was viewed negatively during the spring because of his tirades against Hampton and the state Democrats hoped that an early convention would eliminate any possibility of Gary recovering his support.

At the convention in Columbia, a motion to proceed with nominations was immediately brought to a vote and it passed by a margin of 84 to 63. Unable to stop the nominating process and with little support, Gary refused to let his name be nominated for governor so as to avoid the embarrassment of an overwhelming defeat. Johnson Hagood, a conservative Democrat, was nominated for governor by acclamation.

== Republican Convention ==
The state Republicans held their convention in early September and the sentiment of the delegates heading into the convention was to mount an all-out attempt on the state offices. Led by Thomas E. Miller and other notable black leaders, they reasoned that although they might not win, it would maintain the cohesion and organization of the state party. However, as in the previous gubernatorial election, the party leaders stressed the futility of launching a statewide campaign. Nevertheless, a special committee was created to discuss the issue.

The committee not only reported that nominations for statewide offices should be made but also formulated a state ticket. On the ticket for governor was John Winsmith, an elderly white native South Carolinian from Spartanburg, and Thomas E. Miller for lieutenant governor. Other men of vague character made up the rest of the ticket and objections were made as to the lack of quality men on the ticket. The chairman of the committee responded that it was the best that they could do and more respectable Republicans refused to be nominated.

Robert B. Elliott, chairman of the state Republican party, then took the floor and reiterated the same arguments against nominations that he made in 1878. He stated that nominating a statewide ticket would only serve to incite the Democrats to wage an aggressive campaign which would ruin the chances of the Republican presidential candidate in the state. Furthermore, if the Republicans simply waited in the shadows, the Democrats would eventually be wreaked by internal dissension because the primary reason for Democratic unity was Republican opposition.

Elliott compared the situation of the Democrats to that of the Republicans during Reconstruction, how the splintering campaigns by the Independent Republicans in 1872 and 1874 caused the eventual downfall of the regular Republicans in 1876. He pointed out the rise of agrarian dissatisfaction in the state by the organization of a Greenback party as the beginning of the breakup of the Democratic party.

Proponents of the state ticket wavered in their support upon hearing Elliott, and the issue was left with the executive committee of the party. With Elliott as the leader of the party, the matter was buried and no state ticket was formed.

== Greenback-Labor Convention ==
During September, the Greenback-Labor party held their first convention in the state at Chester. There were only 45 delegates from 8 counties, but they still nominated a statewide ticket for the general election. Despite being newly formed, they fused with the Republicans only in a few isolated places and were considerably ill-equipped to take on a united and formidable Democratic party.

== General election ==
The general election was held on November 2, 1880 and Johnson Hagood was elected as governor of South Carolina with nominal opposition. Turnout was slightly more than the previous gubernatorial election because there was a somewhat organized opposition candidate.

South Carolina Gubernatorial Election, 1880
Party	Candidate	Votes	%	±%
Democratic	Johnson Hagood	117,432	96.41	−3.4
Greenback-Labor	L. W. R. Blair	4,277	3.51	+3.5
No party	Write-Ins	92	0.08	−0.1
Majority		113,155	92.90	−6.7
Turnout		121,801		
Democratic hold				

== See also ==
- Governor of South Carolina
- List of governors of South Carolina
- South Carolina gubernatorial elections

Preceded by 1878	South Carolina gubernatorial elections	Succeeded by 1882
