= Hiram W. Duncan =

Reconstruction Era South Carolina state senator

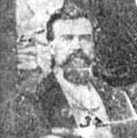

South Carolina Senate
- In office 1868–1872
- Succeeded by: Thomas Bothwell Jeter

Hiram W. Duncan was a state senator in South Carolina during the Reconstruction era.

He represented Union County, South Carolina in the South Carolina Senate.

He was succeeded in the state senate in November 1872 by Thomas Bothwell Jeter who went on to become governor.
