= Denise L. Carter =

American government official

Denise Carter
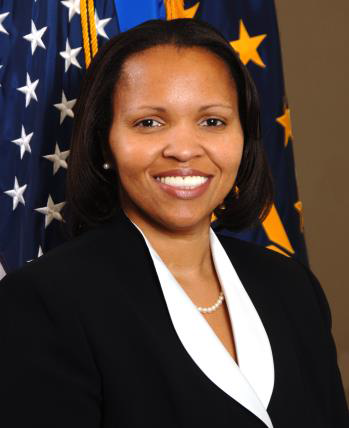
- Official portrait, 2021

Acting United States Secretary of Education
- In office January 20, 2025 – March 3, 2025
- President: Donald Trump
- Preceded by: Miguel Cardona
- Succeeded by: Linda McMahon

Acting United States Deputy Secretary of Education
- In office January 20, 2021 – May 18, 2021
- President: Joe Biden
- Preceded by: Mick Zais
- Succeeded by: Cindy Marten

Denise L. Carter is an American government official serving as the principal deputy chief operating officer for Student Aid in the United States Department of Education. She served as the acting United States secretary of education from January 20, 2025, until March 3, 2025.

== Career ==
Carter served in the United States Department of Health and Human Services in multiple roles, including as Deputy Assistant Secretary for Human Resources. She served as Acting Chief Operating Officer for Student Aid from July 2024 until April 2025.

Carter was appointed acting United States secretary of education by President Donald Trump on January 20, 2025, and was succeeded by Linda McMahon on March 3, 2025, following her confirmation by Congress.

Carter retired from the Department of Education on April 2, 2025.

Political offices
Preceded by Mick Zais	United States Deputy Secretary of Education; Acting; 2021	Succeeded by Cindy Marten
Preceded by Miguel Cardona	United States Secretary of Education; Acting; 2025	Succeeded by Linda McMahon
