= South Carolina Education Association =

Public education advocacy organization

The South Carolina Education Association (The SCEA)
- The South Carolina Education Association
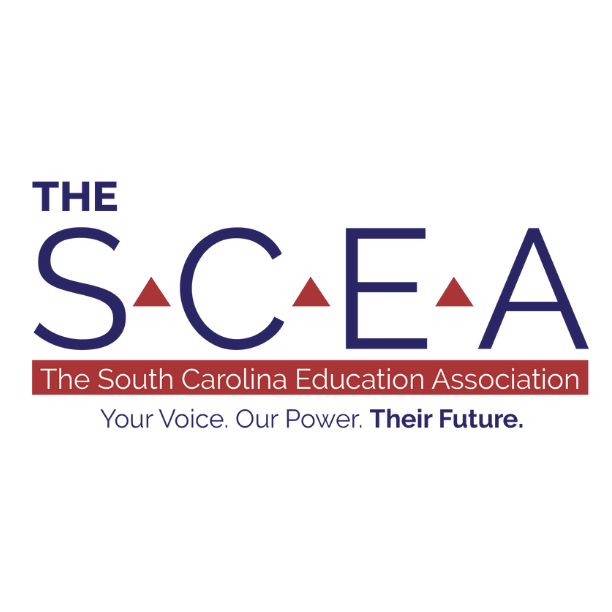
- Founded: 1881
- Headquarters: 2999 Sunset Blvd., Suite 200, West Columbia, SC 29169
- Location: South Carolina
- President: Dr. Dena R. Crews
- Vice-President: Dr. Karen Greene
- Executive Director: Tom F. Hudson
- Affiliations: National Education Association (NEA)
- Website: https://www.thescea.org

The South Carolina Education Association (The SCEA) is a public education advocacy organization in the U.S. state of South Carolina, representing both teachers and educational support professionals.

== Organization and functions ==
It has local affiliates in each of the state's 81 public school districts. As the state affiliate of the National Education Association--the largest labor union in the United States-- The SCEA is the only union for educators and public school employees in South Carolina.

The SCEA regularly comments on state-level educational issues and performs advocacy work. Members of The SCEA participated in the #REDforEd teacher activities. The organization stressed that events in South Carolina were not officially sanctioned and that it was not an organizer but it did offer to support its members that did participate

== History ==
The SCEA was founded in 1881 as a teachers' advocacy organization. However, at that time membership was limited only to White educators. On April 1, 1967, the SCEA merged with the Palmetto Education Association, a parallel association of Black educators founded in 1896. The merger of these two educational organizations was the largest combination of racially segregated associations in the history of the state of South Carolina. Membership in The SCEA rose to nearly 25,000 black and white educators immediately after the merger.

The SCEA was an important contributor to the development of the South Carolina Education Improvement Act (EIA) of 1984, where it participated in direct negotiations with Governor Richard Riley. As a compromise for accepting a merit pay structure, it negotiated a 16% pay increase for educators in the state, bringing their salaries near or above the industry average for the Southeastern United States. This legislation was considered to be the most comprehensive state-level educational reform in the United States to date.

== See also ==
- Palmetto Education Association
- Palmetto State Teachers Association
- SC for Ed
