= East Village High School =

Public high school in California, United States

Location
- 1425 Russ Boulevard; San Diego, California; United States
- Coordinates: 32.7192°N 117.1519°W

Information
- Type: Public
- School district: San Diego Unified School District
- NCES School ID: 063432012303
- Principal: Mitchelle Booze
- Teaching staff: 7.93 (FTE)
- Grades: 9 to 12
- Enrollment: 124 (2023-2024)
- Student to teacher ratio: 15.64
- Color
- Mascot: Dragon
- Website: www.sandiegounified.org/schools/eastvillage

East Village High School (EVHS) is a public high school in downtown San Diego, California. It is located on the campus of San Diego City College. The school is part of San Diego Unified School District. It was previously named San Diego Early/Middle College until 2016.

== Academics ==
This nontraditional high school offers free college enrollment to its students in the 11th and 12th grade. While earning their high school diploma, a student attending EVHS can earn up to a years worth of college credit.
