= Palmetto Promise Institute =

Conservative think tank

- Founder: Jim DeMint
- Established: 2009
- Mission: Palmetto Promise Institute promotes policy solutions to support a free and flourishing South Carolina, where every individual has the opportunity to reach their full, God-given potential.
- President and CEO: Wendy Damron
- Budget: $530,000 (2023)
- Formerly called: Palmetto Fort Foundation, Palmetto Policy Forum
- Address: P.O. Box 12676 Columbia SC 29205
- Coordinates: 34.0000°N 81.0388°W
- Website: Official website

The Palmetto Promise Institute (PPI) is a conservative think tank in South Carolina. The organization was formerly named the Palmetto Fort Foundation and the Palmetto Policy Forum.

== Overview ==
The organization was founded as the Palmetto Fort Foundation in 2009 in honor of the Battle of Fort Moultrie. It was relaunched by Jim DeMint in 2013 with $300,000 of his leftover campaign money. Its president and chief executive officer is Wendy Damron.

The organization's board of directors includes Rick Timmons, Louie L. Cason Jr., Jeff Yelton, Dan Adams, Jim DeMint, Van Hipp Jr., Phil Hughes, Stu Rodman, and Barry Wynn.

The think tank was named as a co-defendant, along with Governor Henry McMaster and others, in the South Carolina Supreme Court case Adams v McMaster. The lawsuit stemmed from McMaster's plan to spend $32 million in federal coronavirus aid to help families pay for K-12 private school tuition. In the case, the court ruled that McMaster's SAFE Grants, which were promoted publicly by the Palmetto Promise Institute, were a violation of the state constitution's prohibition against state funds being used to fund private schools.

Palmetto Promise Institute is part of the conservative and libertarian State Policy Network.
