= Jim Rex =

American educator (born 1941)

South Carolina Superintendent of Education
- In office January 10, 2007 – January 12, 2011
- Governor: Mark Sanford
- Preceded by: Inez Tenenbaum
- Succeeded by: Mick Zais

Personal details
- Born: November 21, 1941 (age 84) Toledo, Ohio, U.S.
- Party: Alliance
- Other political affiliations: Democratic (Before 2013)
- Spouse: Sue
- Children: 4
- Education: University of Toledo, (B.A., M.Ed., Ph.D.)
- Occupation: Educator

Jim Rex (born November 21, 1941) is an American politician who served as the 16th South Carolina Superintendent of Education. He ran for the position in 2006 as a Democrat, against Karen Floyd, a Republican. Rex defeated Floyd by only 455 votes, the closest margin of victory in a statewide election in South Carolina's history. He was sworn in as superintendent on January 10, 2007, replacing fellow Democrat Inez Tenenbaum. In 2014, Rex co-founded a new political party – the American Party of South Carolina, now known as the Alliance Party of South Carolina.

Until 2026, he was the last Democrat to have won a statewide election in South Carolina. While Yancey McGill briefly held the office of Lieutenant Governor from June 2014 to January 2015, he was elected by the state senators, and while Brian Gaines has been State Comptroller since 2023, that was the result of a gubernatorial appointment.

== Education and early career ==
Rex received a bachelor's degree in English, a master's degree in education administration, and a doctorate degree in curriculum and instruction from the University of Toledo. He and his wife Sue have four children. He lives on Lake Wateree in Fairfield County.

Prior to becoming superintendent, Rex was an English teacher and football coach in Ohio, the dean of education at Winthrop University, the dean of education at Coastal Carolina University, president of Columbia College, vice president for development and alumni relations and vice president of university advancement at the University of South Carolina.

== South Carolina Superintendent of Education ==
Rex championed reforms in accountability and pushed for advances in public school choice and innovation. In addition to replacing the unpopular Palmetto Achievement Test (PACT) with the Palmetto Assessment of State Standards (PASS), he also worked with the General Assembly to reform the state's system of annual school report cards, eliminate burdensome paperwork for teachers, change South Carolina's student performance targets to bring them into alignment with other states, and create a mandate to review the state's accountability system every five years.

Shortly after taking office, Rex created the Office of Public School Choice and Innovation within the South Carolina Department of Education, combining innovative approaches to education with technological advancement, both inside and outside the classroom, to help students learn. New and improved options include single-gender education, Montessori programs, charter schools and virtual learning. His bill for a comprehensive public school choice plan was passed by the General Assembly, but failed to become law after Governor Mark Sanford - under pressure from supporters of vouchers and tax credits - vetoed the legislation. Despite this setback, South Carolina has become a national leader in public school choice options during Rex's tenure.

When Governor Mark Sanford attempted to reject roughly $511 million in American Recovery and Reinvestment Act funds allotted for education in 2009, Rex led the fight to force the Governor to accept the money, working with leaders in Washington, D.C., and Columbia to find a way around his objection. In the end, the General Assembly supported Rex's position on the issue and included the money in the budget, forcing a lawsuit. The issue was eventually resolved when the South Carolina Supreme Court ordered the governor to accept the funds.

== 2010 gubernatorial candidacy ==
On August 6, 2009, Rex announced he was exploring the possibility of either seeking reelection as State Superintendent of Education or running for Governor of South Carolina in 2010. On September 15, he announced his candidacy for governor.

On the campaign trail, Rex advocated for revenue and funding reform in order to relieve some of the extreme cuts caused by the budget crisis that began in 2008. One of his ideas – the Tax Realignment Commission – was already in progress before the campaign began, but he expressed concern that the General Assembly might try to water down the reform in an effort to appeal to special interest groups.

Another key component of Rex's platform was his plan to raise the cigarette tax. South Carolina's tax, which was $0.07 per pack at the time Rex began to advocate an increase, was far from the national average of $1.34 per pack. Ultimately, the General Assembly compromised on the issue and raised the tax to $0.37 per pack, still $0.97 below the national average. Rex repeatedly stated that an increase to $1.34, indexed to increase with the national average in the future, would have prevented teacher furloughs and decreased teen smoking.

Rex finished second in the Democratic primary to State Senator Vincent Sheheen, whom he endorsed for governor in September.

Political offices
Preceded by Inez Tenenbaum	South Carolina Superintendent of Education; 2007-2011	Succeeded by Mick Zais
Party political offices
Preceded by Inez Tenenbaum	Democratic nominee for South Carolina Superintendent of Education; 2006	Succeeded by Frank Holleman
Academic offices
Preceded by Phyllis Bonanno	President of Columbia College; 2000–2001	Succeeded by Caroline Whitson
