= San Diego Unified School District =

School district in San Diego, California, United States

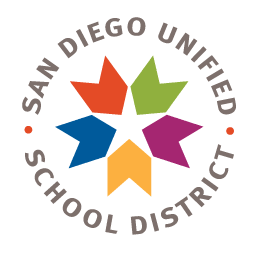

Address
- 4100 Normal Street San Diego, California, 92103; United States

District information
- Type: Public
- Grades: Preschool - 12
- Established: July 1, 1854; 172 years ago
- Superintendent: Fabiola Bagula (acting)
- Schools: 176
- Budget: $2,309,589,000 (2019–2020)
- NCES District ID: 0634320

Students and staff
- Students: 95,233 (2021–2022)
- Teachers: 4,289.35 (FTE) (2021–2022)
- Staff: 5783.98 (FTE) (2021–2022)
- Student–teacher ratio: 22.20:1 (2021–2022)

Other information
- Website: sandiegounified.org

San Diego Unified School District (SDUSD) is a public school district based in San Diego, California, United States. Founded in 1854, it is the second largest school district in California. The district includes 121 elementary schools, 24 middle schools, 21 high schools, and two atypical schools.

== District ==
San Diego Unified School District is the second largest school district in California and the largest in San Diego County. The district covers most of San Diego with the exception of San Ysidro, which is served by San Ysidro Elementary School District and Sweetwater Union High School District. As well as Carmel Mountain Ranch, Rancho Peñosquitos, and Rancho Bernardo which are served by the Poway Unified School District.

== Schools ==
=== High schools ===
- Canyon Hills High School
- Clairemont High School
- East Village High School
- Herbert Hoover High School
- James Madison High School
- Kearny High School
- La Jolla High School
- Lincoln High School
- Mira Mesa High School
- Mission Bay High School
- Morse High School
- Patrick Henry High School
- Point Loma High School
- San Diego High School
- Scripps Ranch High School
- University City High School
- Will C. Crawford High School

=== Middle schools ===
- Bell Middle School
- Challenger Middle School
- Clark Middle School
- Correia Middle School
- Creative, Performing, and Media Arts Magnet Middle
- Dana Middle School
- Deportola Middle School
- Farb Middle School
- Innovation Middle School
- Knox Middle School
- Lewis Middle School
- Mann Middle School
- Marston Middle School
- Millennial Tech Middle School
- Montgomery Middle School
- Muirlands Middle School
- Pacific Beach Middle School
- Pershing Middle School
- Roosevelt International Middle School
- Standley Middle School
- Taft Middle School
- Thurgood Marshall Middle School
- Wangeheim Middle School
- Wilson Middle School

=== K-8 schools ===
- Audubon K-8
- Bethune K-8
- Fulton K-8
- Golden Hill K-8
- Grant K-8
- John Muir Language Academy K-8
- Language Academy
- Logan Memorial Educational Campus
- Longfellow K-8
- Mountain View School K-8
- Perkins K-8

=== Elementary schools ===
- Adams Elementary
- Alcott Elementary
- Angier Elementary
- Audubon Elementary
- Baker Elementary
- Balboa Elementary
- Barnard Mandarin Magnet Elementary
- Bay Park Elementary
- Benchley Weinberger Elementary
- Bird Rock Elementary
- Birney Elementary
- Boone Elementary
- Burbank Elementary
- Cabrillo Elementary
- Cadman Elementary
- Carson Elementary STEAM Magnet
- Carver Elementary
- Central Elementary
- Cesar Chavez Elementary
- Cherokee Point Elementary
- Chesterton Elementary
- Chollas Mead Elementary
- Clairemont Canyons Academy
- Crown Point Junior Music Academy
- Cubberley Elementary
- Curie Elementary
- Dailard Elementary
- Dewey Elementary
- Dingeman Elementary
- Doyle Elementary
- Dr. Bertha Pendleton Elementary
- Edison Elementary School
- Ellen Browning Scripps Elementary
- Emerson Elementary School
- Encanto Elementary
- Erickson Elementary
- Euclid Elementary
- Fay Elementary
- Field Elementary Dual Immersion School
- Fletcher Elementary
- Florence Elementary
- Foster Elementary
- Franklin Elementary STEAM Magnet
- Freese Arts and Culture Museum School
- Fulton Elementary
- Gage Elementary
- Garfield Elementary
- Golden Hill Elementary
- Green Elementary
- Hage Elementary
- Hamilton Elementary
- Hancock Elementary
- Hardy Elementary
- Hawthorne Elementary
- Hearst Elementary
- Hickman Elementary
- Holmes Elementary
- Horton Elementary
- Ibarra Elementary
- Jefferson Elementary
- Jerabek Elementary
- Johnson Elementary
- Jonas Salk Elementary
- Jones Elementary
- Joyner Elementary
- Juarez Elementary
- Kimbrough Elementary
- Kumeyaay Elementary
- La Jolla Elementary
- Lafayette Elementary
- Linda Vista Elementary
- Loma Portal Elementary
- Marshall Elementary
- Marvin Elementary
- Mason Elementary
- McKinley Elementary
- Miller Elementary
- Miramar Ranch Elementary
- Nipaquay Elementary
- Normal Heights Elementary
- Nye Elementary
- Oak Park Elementary
- Ocean Beach Elementary
- Pacific Beach Elementary
- Pacific Leadership Academy
- Paradise Hills Elementary
- Penn Elementary
- Perry Elementary
- Phoebe Hearst Elementary School is a public elementary school in the Del Cerro area. It opened in 1958 and was named after Phoebe Apperson Hearst. The campus has received recognition for academic performance, including from California Business for Academic Excellence.
- Porter Elementary
- Rodriguez Elementary
- Rolando Park Elementary
- Rosa Parks Elementary
- Ross Elementary
- Rowan Elementary
- Sandburg Elementary
- Sequoia Elementary
- Sessions Elementary
- Sherman Elementary
- Silver Gate Elementary
- Spreckels Elementary
- Sunset View Elementary
- Tierrasanta Elementary
- Toler Elementary
- Torrey Pines Elementary
- Valencia Park Elementary
- Vista Grande Elementary
- Walker Elementary
- Washington Elementary
- Webster Elementary
- Wegeforth Elementary
- Whitman Elementary
- Zamorano Elementary

=== Alternative education schools ===
- Alba Community Day School
- Marcy High School
- Mark Twain High School
- Mt. Everest Academy
- New Dawn High School
- Riley Alternative School
- School of Creative and Performing Arts
- TRACE Alternative School Whittier K-12

== School board ==
The district is governed by a seven-member elected board of education; five adults and two preferential-voting student board members. Adult board members are elected by district for four-year terms. Student board members are elected annually by high school students.

The board meets at the Eugene Brucker Education Center located on the former site of the historic San Diego State Normal School.

== Superintendent ==
The superintendent is appointed by the school board.

In 1993, Bertha Pendleton was selected as the superintendent. She was the first woman and first African American in the position, and served until 1998.

From 2010 through 2013 the superintendent was Bill Kowba, a retired Navy rear admiral. On February 26, 2013, Kowba announced his retirement, effective June 30. The next day, February 27, the school board unanimously appointed elementary school principal Cindy Marten as the new superintendent. The quick appointment, without a search process or community input, was described as "highly unusual - virtually unheard of" by The San Diego Union-Tribune. On May 18, 2021, Marten left her job as superintendent to become the United States deputy secretary of education, with Lamont Jackson replacing her as the interim superintendent. Jackson was terminated in August 2024 after an internal investigation found that he had committed sexual misconduct and retaliation against two former district management employees. Deputy Superintendent Fabiola Bagula took over as acting superintendent.

== Partnership with Ocean Discovery Institute ==
In 2017, the district partnered with the Ocean Discovery Institute, a nonprofit that works to teach kids about science and conservation, to bring a $15 million tuition-free learning and research center to the City Heights neighborhood. The building will be a permanent campus for the nonprofit and will include two laboratories, a garden, a community kitchen and a residence for a live-in staff member. The Living Lab allows the nonprofit to reach all 10,000 students that attend and feed into Hoover High School.

== Farm to school program ==
In 2010, the district launched a farm to school program in an effort to bring locally grown produce to schools. The program seeks to provide students access to as much local, regional, and California grown produce as possible. In addition to produce grown at farms, the district has a Garden to Café program which allows schools to be certified by the San Diego Department of Environmental Health allowing the school to grow and serve their own produce.

== Transportation ==
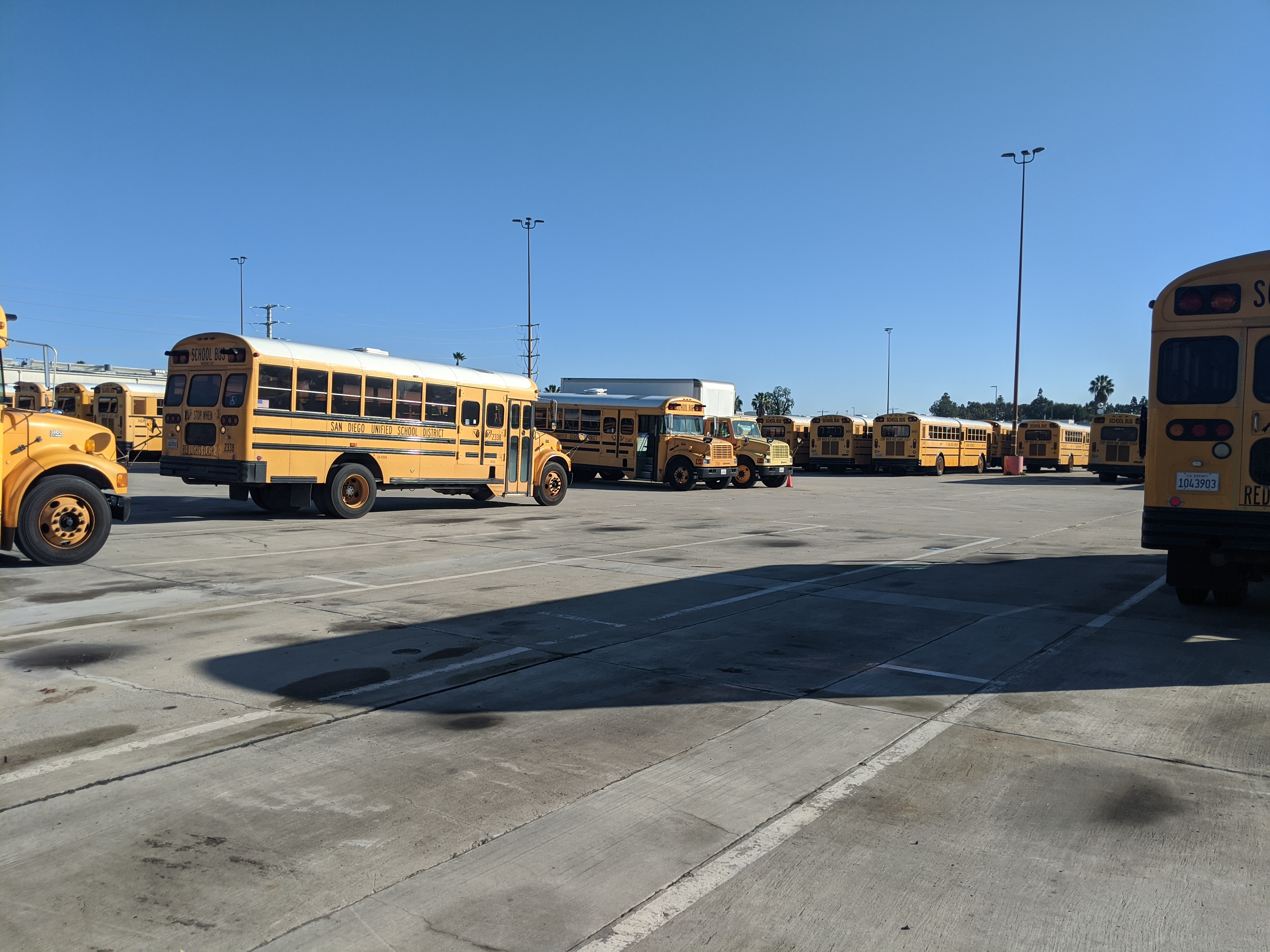
School buses at SDUSD Transportation Department

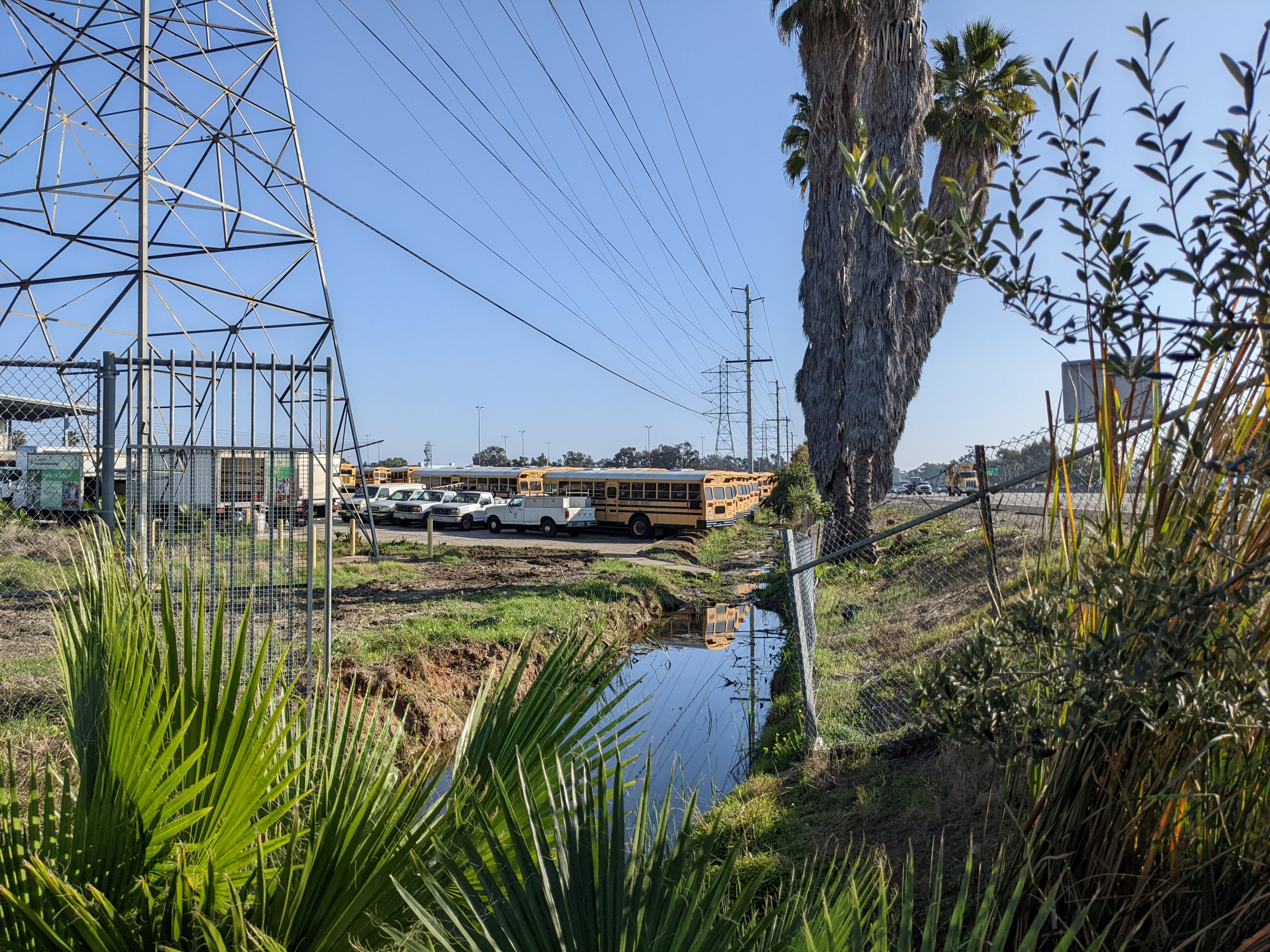
SDUSD transportation yard buses

== See also ==
- List of primary and secondary schools in San Diego, organized by district
