= Thomas Bothwell Jeter =

American politician

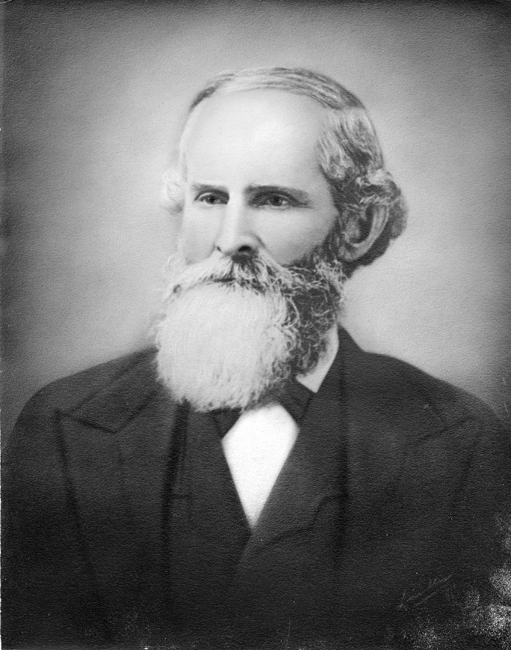

79th Governor of South Carolina
- In office September 1, 1880 – November 30, 1880
- Lieutenant: None
- Preceded by: William Dunlap Simpson
- Succeeded by: Johnson Hagood

President Pro Tempore of the South Carolina Senate
- In office November 28, 1877 – September 1, 1880
- Governor: Wade Hampton III; William Dunlap Simpson
- Preceded by: Stephen Atkins Swails
- Succeeded by: Isaac Donnom Witherspoon

Member of the South Carolina Senate from Union County
- In office November 30, 1880 – November 28, 1882
- Preceded by: Himself
- Succeeded by: William Munro (politician)
- In office November 26, 1872 – September 1, 1880
- Preceded by: Hiram W. Duncan
- Succeeded by: Himself

Member of the South Carolina House of Representatives from Union District
- In office November 24, 1856 – November 22, 1858

Personal details
- Born: October 13, 1827 Santuc, South Carolina, US
- Died: May 20, 1883 (aged 55)
- Party: Democratic
- Relatives: Thomas Bothwell Butler (nephew)

Military service
- Allegiance: Confederate States of America
- Branch/service: Confederate States Army
- Rank: captain
- Battles/wars: American Civil War

Thomas Bothwell Jeter (October 13, 1827 – May 20, 1883) was the 79th governor of South Carolina from September 1, 1880 to November 30, 1880. His home in Union, South Carolina is listed on the National Register of Historic Places.

== Early life and war service ==
Born in Santuc, South Carolina, 5 mi (8.0 km) north of Carlisle in Union County, Jeter attended and graduated from South Carolina College in 1846. He was admitted to the bar 1848 and practiced law in the Upstate while concurrently holding the position of president of the Spartanburg and Union Railroad. Additionally during antebellum, he was elected to the South Carolina House of Representatives in 1856. With the outbreak of the American Civil War in 1861, Jeter volunteered for service in the Confederate Army and was made a captain of infantry.

== Political career ==
After the war, Jeter resumed his law practice. He was elected to the South Carolina Senate in 1872, after becoming disenchanted by Radical Republican rule of the state during Reconstruction. He continued to serve in the Senate and became the President Pro Tempore in November 1877, because of the mass resignations of Republicans after their party's defeat in the gubernatorial election of 1876. The Republicans thereby gave control of the Senate to the Democrats. Wade Hampton won re-election in 1878 for another two-year term, but did not finish the term because he resigned in 1879 after being elected to the U.S. Senate.

Lieutenant Governor William Dunlap Simpson succeeded Hampton and Jeter as the president pro tempore of the Senate, as Jeter became the lieutenant governor. When Simpson resigned on September 1, 1880, upon appointment to be the chief justice of the South Carolina Supreme Court, Jeter became the 79th governor of South Carolina and served for three months.

== Service in the Railroad Commission and death in office ==
In 1882, Jeter was appointed to the South Carolina Railroad Commission and served until his death on May 20, 1883. He was buried at Forestlawn Cemetery in Union.

== Legacy ==
The Gov. Thomas B. Jeter House was added to the National Register of Historic Places in 1974.

Political offices
Preceded by William Dunlap Simpson	Governor of South Carolina; 1880	Succeeded by Johnson Hagood
