= 1884 South Carolina gubernatorial election =

- November 4, 1884
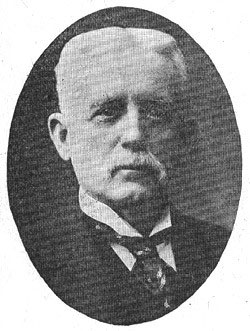
Nominee	Hugh Smith Thompson
Party	Democratic
Popular vote	67,931
Percentage	100.00%
- County Results; Thompson: 90–100%
Governor before election
Hugh Smith Thompson
Democratic
Elected Governor
Hugh Smith Thompson
Democratic

The 1884 South Carolina gubernatorial election was held on November 4, 1884, to select the governor of the state of South Carolina. Governor Hugh Smith Thompson was renominated by the Democrats and was reelected for a second two-year term.

== Democratic Convention ==
Governor Hugh Smith Thompson had made no enemies during his first term as governor and no opposition to his nomination developed at the state Democratic convention of 1884. Thompson was then renominated by acclamation to be the Democratic nominee for governor in the general election, effectively meaning that he would serve two more years since there was no opposition in the general election.

== General election ==
The general election was held on November 4, 1884, and Hugh Smith Thompson was elected as governor of South Carolina without opposition. Turnout was less than the previous gubernatorial election because of the lack of opposition in the general election.

South Carolina Gubernatorial Election, 1884
Party	Candidate	Votes	%	±%
Democratic	Hugh Smith Thompson (incumbent)	67,931	100.00%	+21.0%
Majority		67,931	100.00%	+41.8%
Turnout		67,895		
Democratic hold				

== See also ==
- Governor of South Carolina
- List of governors of South Carolina
- South Carolina gubernatorial elections

Preceded by 1882	South Carolina gubernatorial elections	Succeeded by 1886
