= Justus K. Jillson =

American educator and politician

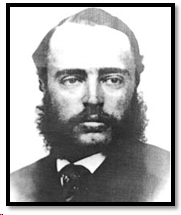

1st South Carolina Superintendent of Education
- In office July 6, 1868 – December 14, 1876
- Governor: Robert Kingston Scott; Franklin J. Moses, Jr. Daniel Henry Chamberlain
- Preceded by: Office established
- Succeeded by: Hugh Smith Thompson

Personal details
- Born: 1839 Gardner, Massachusetts
- Died: 1881 (aged 41–42) Springfield, Massachusetts
- Cause of death: Suicide
- Party: Republican

Justus Kendall Jillson (1839–1881) was an American educator and politician. He served as South Carolina Superintendent of Education from 1868 to 1876 and in the South Carolina Senate from 1868 to 1871. He was a Republican.

Jilson was born in Gardner, Massachusetts, in 1839, to parents Mary and Sylvester Jillson. His brothers were Henry and Leander. Jillson married Ellen Gates in 1858. He moved from Massachusetts to South Carolina in 1866 to teach for the Freedmen's Bureau. He served four terms from 1868 until 1876 as South Carolina Superintendent of Education, head of the South Carolina Department of Education, and was the first to hold the title. He reportedly struggled with corruption in state government. Jillson was a member of the South Carolina Senate from 1868 to 1871, and chaired the education committee. During his political career, Jilson was affiliated with the Republican Party.

He issued the first Annual Report of the State Superintendent of Education of the State of South Carolina to the Governor of South Carolina and state legislature. His efforts at integration included a deaf school. Its leaders resigned instead of accepting African American deaf students.

Jillson moved to Springfield, Massachusetts, in 1876 and died by suicide in 1881.
