= Johnson Hagood (politician) =

American politician

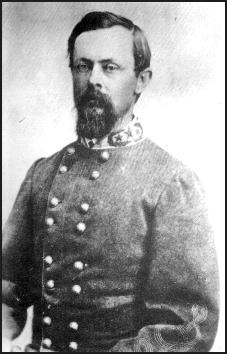

80th Governor of South Carolina
- In office December 1, 1880 – December 1, 1882
- Lieutenant: John D. Kennedy
- Preceded by: Thomas Bothwell Jeter
- Succeeded by: Hugh Smith Thompson

20th Comptroller General of South Carolina
- In office December 14, 1876 – December 1, 1880
- Governor: Wade Hampton III; William Dunlap Simpson; Thomas Bothwell Jeter
- Preceded by: Thomas C. Dunn
- Succeeded by: John C. Coit

Personal details
- Born: Johnson Hagood; February 21, 1829 Barnwell, South Carolina, U.S
- Died: January 4, 1898 (aged 68) Barnwell, South Carolina, U.S.
- Resting place: Church of the Holy Apostles (Barnwell, South Carolina)
- Party: Democratic Party
- Spouse: Eloise B. Butler
- Education: The Citadel
- Profession: Planter, soldier, politician
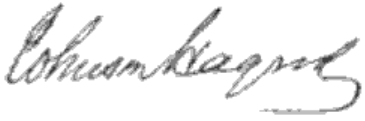
- Signature

Military service
- Allegiance: Confederate States of America
- Branch/service: Confederate States Army
- Years of service: 1861–1865
- Rank: Brigadier General
- Unit: 1st South Carolina Infantry
- Battles/wars: American Civil War: Battle of Fort Sumter; Northern Virginia Campaign; Second Battle of Bull Run; Second Battle of Fort Wagner; Overland Campaign; Battle of Drewry's Bluff; Battle of Cold Harbor; Richmond-Petersburg Campaign; Wilmington Campaign; Battle of Wilmington

Johnson Hagood (February 21, 1829 – January 4, 1898) was a Confederate-American planter, soldier and military officer in the Confederate States Army during the American Civil War, reaching the rank of brigadier general in the state militia and regular Confederate Army in 1862.

After the war, he became a politician in the Democratic Party. After being elected in 1876 as Comptroller General and serving a term to 1880, he was elected after the Reconstruction era as the 80th governor of South Carolina, serving a standard two-year term from 1880 to 1882.

== Early years ==
Born in 1829 in Barnwell, South Carolina, to a planter family, Hagood attended the private Richmond Academy in Augusta, Georgia. He attended the South Carolina Military Academy (now The Citadel), graduating in 1847 at the top of his class. He was admitted to the bar in 1850, but never practiced law.

== Civil War ==
When the Civil War began in 1861, Hagood enlisted as a private in the First South Carolina Volunteers. He demonstrated remarkable skills in the military arts and rose rapidly through the ranks of the enlisted and subsequently as an officer. By 1862, due to his bravery in the field and considerable administrative acumen in camp, he was appointed a brigadier general and assistant adjutant general of the South Carolina Militia. His first commission in the Confederate States Army was as a colonel in the 1st (Hagood's) South Carolina Infantry. He participated in the Battle of Fort Sumter and the Second Battle of Bull Run, receiving appointment to brigadier general, effective July 21, 1862.

During the 1864 Overland Campaign, Hagood brought a brigade north to Petersburg, Virginia, and fought under Major General Robert F. Hoke in the battles of Drewry's Bluff and Cold Harbor. He and his men served in the entrenchments at the Siege of Petersburg until December 1864, when Hoke's Division was ordered to the relief of Fort Fisher. Hagood commanded Fort Anderson during the Battle of Wilmington.

== Battle of Fort Wagner and later surrender ==
After defeating Colonel Robert Gould Shaw and the all-black 54th Massachusetts Regiment at the second Battle of Fort Wagner in July 1863, commanding Confederate General Johnson Hagood had the bodies of nearly all the dead Union officers returned to their lines, as was customary. But he deliberately had Shaw's body stripped, robbed, and buried in a mass grave with his black soldiers, which was considered an insult. Like many Confederate officers, he believed that the African-American soldiers were fugitive slaves and characterized the attack on the fort as a slave revolt led by Shaw.

Regarding Shaw, Hagood reportedly told a captured Union surgeon that “Had he been in command of white troops, I should have given him an honorable burial; as it is, I shall bury him in the common trench with the niggers that fell with him.” Contrary to Hagood's intentions, Colonel Shaw's friends and family considered the choice of burial to be an honor. Frank Shaw publicly stated he was proud that his son was buried with the soldiers he fell with while leading the 54th Massachusetts.

At the end of the war, Hagood's troops were serving under General Joseph E. Johnston in North Carolina. He may have surrendered with Johnston at Durham Station in April, 1865, although Hagood's brigade was then commanded by its senior colonel at the time. No record of Hagood's parole has ever been found.

== Postbellum political career ==
After the war, Hagood resumed operating his plantation. Like other planters, he struggled with the change to free labor after slaves were emancipated. Many freedmen who had been associated with his plantation continued to work for him, but others left for towns and urban areas.

He opposed the administration of Radical Republicans during Reconstruction. He actively campaigned for fellow Confederate general Wade Hampton III in the 1876 gubernatorial contest and was elected on the Democratic state ticket as Comptroller General. The campaign season was marked by white violence against freedmen, to suppress their voting and defeat Republicans, and many county returns were noted for fraud, where intimidation of freedmen had continued by Democrats at the polls.

Hagood served one term as Comptroller General. In 1880, he was nominated by the state Democrats for governor and easily won the gubernatorial election that fall, as Democrats again suppressed Black voting and the federal government had withdrawn its troops in 1877. Hagood's major achievement in his two-year term, to December 1882, was the reopening of The Citadel in 1882.

Hagood died in Barnwell on January 4, 1898. He was buried at Church of the Holy Apostles Episcopal cemetery.

== Legacy and honors ==
- Johnson Hagood Stadium at The Citadel was named in his honor.
- Hagood, South Carolina is named for him, as well as several streets throughout South Carolina.
- Image: Johnson Hagood Portrait at the South Carolina State House

== See also ==
- List of American Civil War generals (Confederate)

== Notes ==
Party political offices
| Preceded by Wade Hampton III | Democratic nominee for Governor of South Carolina; 1880 | Succeeded by Hugh Smith Thompson |
Political offices
| Preceded by Thomas Bothwell Jeter | Governor of South Carolina; 1880–1882 | Succeeded by Hugh Smith Thompson |
