= Molly Spearman =

American teacher and politician

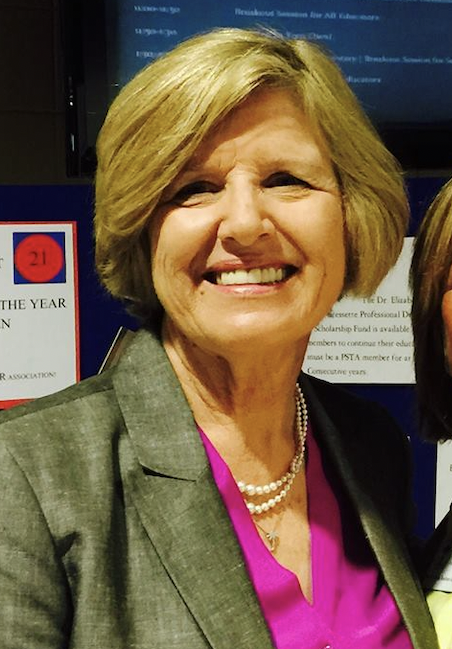
- Spearman in 2018

South Carolina Superintendent of Education
- In office January 14, 2015 – January 11, 2023
- Governor: Nikki Haley; Henry McMaster
- Preceded by: Mick Zais
- Succeeded by: Ellen Weaver

Member of the South Carolina House of Representatives from the 39th district
- In office January 12, 1993 – February 3, 1999
- Preceded by: Larry Gentry
- Succeeded by: Marion Frye

Personal details
- Born: January 23, 1954 (age 72) Saluda, South Carolina, U.S.
- Party: Democratic (Before 1995); Republican (1995–present)
- Education: Lander University (BA); George Washington University (MA); University of South Carolina (EdS)

Molly Mitchell Spearman (born January 23, 1954) is an American educator and politician who served as the South Carolina Superintendent of Education from 2015 to 2023. She is a Republican.

She grew up on her family's farm in Saluda County, South Carolina. She received a B.A. in music education from Lander University, has a master's degree in education supervision from George Washington University, and an education specialist degree from the University of South Carolina.

She taught music at public schools, served four terms in the South Carolina House of Representatives, and was Deputy Superintendent of Education before being elected Superintendent of Education in November 2014.

According to her biography on the state's website, she plays organ at her church.

In 2020, she worked to deal with the COVID-19 pandemic including addressing issues related to online learning and how to reopen schools safely.

Party political offices
Preceded by Mick Zais	Republican nominee for South Carolina Superintendent of Education; 2014, 2018	Succeeded by Ellen Weaver
Political offices
Preceded by Mick Zais	South Carolina Superintendent of Education; 2015–2023	Succeeded by Ellen Weaver
