= William Munro (politician) =

State senator in South Carolina

- Born: c. 1836; South Carolina
- Died: 1900 (aged 63–64)
- Occupation: State senator
- Known for: Representing Union County, South Carolina in 1887
- Father: Robert Munro

William Munro (c. 1836–1900) was a state senator in South Carolina. He represented Union County, South Carolina in 1887. His father, Robert Munro, was born in Scotland August 19, 1796.
