= United States Secretary of Education =

Head of the Department of Education

- Seal of the Department of Education

- Flag of the secretary

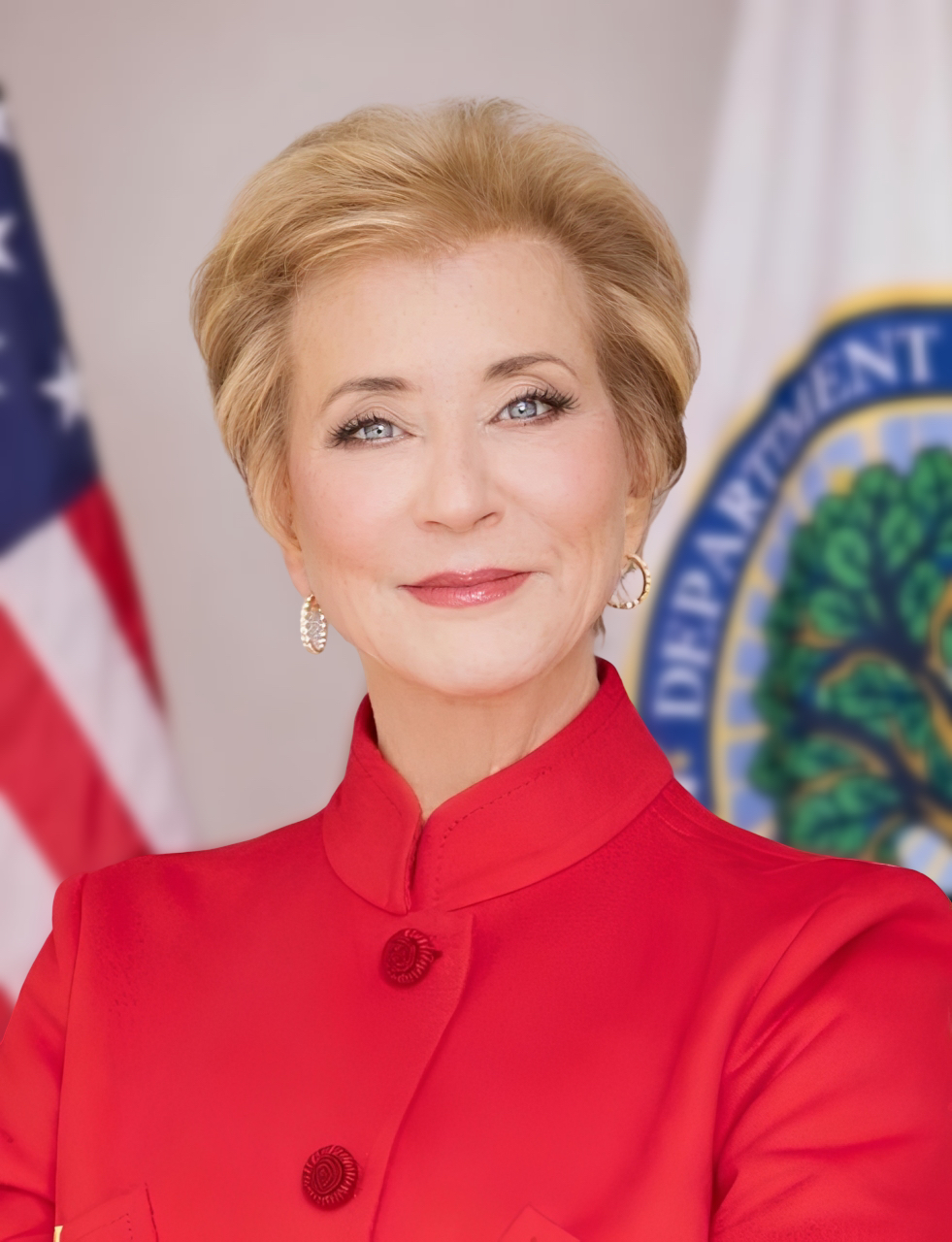
- Incumbent; Linda McMahon since March 3, 2025
- Department of Education
- Style: Madam Secretary (informal); The Honorable (formal)
- Member of: Cabinet of the United States
- Reports to: President of the United States
- Seat: Lyndon Baines Johnson Department of Education Building; Washington, D.C.
- Appointer: The president; with advice and consent of the Senate
- Term length: No fixed term
- Constituting instrument: 20 U.S.C. § 3411
- Formation: November 30, 1979; 46 years ago
- First holder: Shirley Hufstedler
- Succession: Sixteenth
- Deputy: Deputy Secretary
- Salary: Executive Schedule, Level I
- Website: ed.gov

The United States secretary of education is the head of the United States Department of Education. The secretary serves as the principal advisor to the president of the United States, and the federal government, on policies, programs, and activities related to all education in the United States. As a member of the Cabinet of the United States, the secretary is sixteenth in the line of succession to the presidency. Prior to its creation as an Executive Department, there was a non-Cabinet level position called the United States commissioner of education who led the United States Office of Education.

The current secretary of education is Linda McMahon, serving in this role under President Donald Trump.

== Function ==
The United States secretary of education is a member of the president's Cabinet and is the sixteenth in the United States presidential line of succession. This secretary deals with federal influence over education policy, and heads the United States Department of Education.

The secretary is advised by the National Advisory Committee on Institutional Quality and Integrity, an advisory committee, on "matters related to accreditation and to the eligibility and certification process for institutions of higher education."

== List of secretaries ==
Prior to the creation of the Department of Education in 1979, Education was a division of the Department of Health, Education, and Welfare.

Parties

Democrat Republican

Status

Denotes an acting secretary

=== Health, Education, and Welfare ===
No.	Portrait	Name	State of residence	Took office	Left office	President(s)
1		Oveta Culp Hobby	Texas	April 11, 1953	July 31, 1955	Dwight D. Eisenhower (1953–1961)
2		Marion B. Folsom	New York	August 2, 1955	July 31, 1958	Dwight D. Eisenhower (1953–1961)
3		Arthur Flemming	Ohio	August 1, 1958	January 19, 1961	Dwight D. Eisenhower (1953–1961)
4		Abraham A. Ribicoff	Connecticut	January 21, 1961	July 13, 1962	John F. Kennedy (1961–1963)
5		Anthony J. Celebrezze	Ohio	July 31, 1962	August 17, 1965	John F. Kennedy (1961–1963)
5		Anthony J. Celebrezze	Ohio	July 31, 1962	August 17, 1965	Lyndon B. Johnson (1963–1969)
6		John W. Gardner	California	August 18, 1965	March 1, 1968	Lyndon B. Johnson (1963–1969)
7		Wilbur J. Cohen	Michigan	May 16, 1968	January 20, 1969	Lyndon B. Johnson (1963–1969)
8		Robert Finch	California	January 21, 1969	June 23, 1970	Richard Nixon (1969–1974)
9		Elliot L. Richardson	Massachusetts	June 24, 1970	January 29, 1973	Richard Nixon (1969–1974)
10		Caspar Weinberger	California	February 12, 1973	August 8, 1975	Richard Nixon (1969–1974)
10		Caspar Weinberger	California	February 12, 1973	August 8, 1975	Gerald Ford (1974–1977)
11		F. David Mathews	Alabama	August 8, 1975	January 20, 1977	Gerald Ford (1974–1977)
12		Joseph A. Califano Jr.	District of Columbia	January 25, 1977	August 3, 1979	Jimmy Carter (1977–1981)
13		Patricia Roberts Harris	District of Columbia	August 3, 1979	May 4, 1980	Jimmy Carter (1977–1981)

=== Education ===
No.	Portrait	Name	State of residence	Took office	Left office	President
1		Shirley Hufstedler	California	November 30, 1979	January 20, 1981	Jimmy Carter (1977–1981)
2		Terrel Bell	Utah	January 22, 1981	January 20, 1985	Ronald Reagan (1981–1989)
		William Bennett	North Carolina	February 6, 1985	September 20, 1988	Ronald Reagan (1981–1989)
3		William Bennett	North Carolina	February 6, 1985	September 20, 1988	Ronald Reagan (1981–1989)
4		Lauro Cavazos	Texas	September 20, 1988	December 12, 1990	Ronald Reagan (1981–1989)
4		Lauro Cavazos	Texas	September 20, 1988	December 12, 1990	George H. W. Bush (1989–1993)
–		Ted Sanders; Acting	Illinois	December 12, 1990	March 22, 1991	George H. W. Bush (1989–1993)
5		Lamar Alexander	Tennessee	March 22, 1991	January 20, 1993	George H. W. Bush (1989–1993)
6		Richard Riley	South Carolina	January 21, 1993	January 20, 2001	Bill Clinton (1993–2001)
7		Rod Paige	Texas	January 20, 2001	January 20, 2005	George W. Bush (2001–2009)
8		Margaret Spellings	Texas	January 20, 2005	January 20, 2009	George W. Bush (2001–2009)
9		Arne Duncan	Illinois	January 21, 2009	January 1, 2016	Barack Obama (2009–2017)
10		John King Jr.	New York	January 1, 2016	March 14, 2016	Barack Obama (2009–2017)
10		John King Jr.	New York	March 14, 2016	January 20, 2017	Barack Obama (2009–2017)
–		Phil Rosenfelt; Acting	Virginia	January 20, 2017	February 7, 2017	Donald Trump (2017–2021)
11		Betsy DeVos	Michigan	February 7, 2017	January 8, 2021	Donald Trump (2017–2021)
–		Mick Zais; Acting	South Carolina	January 8, 2021	January 20, 2021	Donald Trump (2017–2021)
–		Phil Rosenfelt; Acting	Virginia	January 20, 2021	March 2, 2021	Joe Biden (2021–2025)
12		Miguel Cardona	Connecticut	March 2, 2021	January 20, 2025	Joe Biden (2021–2025)
–		Denise L. Carter; Acting		January 20, 2025	March 3, 2025	Donald Trump (2025–present)
13		Linda McMahon	Connecticut	March 3, 2025	present	Donald Trump (2025–present)

== See also ==
- Education in the United States
- Special education in the United States

U.S. order of precedence (ceremonial)
Preceded by Chris Wright as Secretary of Energy	Order of precedence of the United States as Secretary of Education	Succeeded by Doug Collins as Secretary of Veterans Affairs
U.S. presidential line of succession
Preceded by Secretary of Energy; Chris Wright	16th in line	Succeeded by Secretary of Veterans Affairs; Doug Collins
