= Barbara S. Nielsen =

American politician (1942–2024)

South Carolina Superintendent of Education
- In office January 13, 1991 – January 9, 1999
- Governor: Carroll Campbell; David Beasley
- Preceded by: Charlie G. Williams
- Succeeded by: Inez Tenenbaum

Personal details
- Born: December 2, 1942
- Died: September 3, 2024
- Political party: Republican

Barbara Stock Nielsen (December 2, 1942 – September 3, 2024) was an American politician who served as South Carolina Superintendent of Education, from 1991 to 1999. She was a member of the Republican Party.

== Career ==
Nielsen was the first woman elected in South Carolina to serve as State Superintendent of Education and the second woman elected to statewide office. She served as the first Republican State Superintendent of Education.

One of her significant contributions was the development of public charter schools.

Nielsen died on September 3, 2024.

Governor Henry McMaster issued an Executive Order to have flags flown at half mast in her honor.
