= South Carolina Superintendent of Education =

Superintendent of Education of South Carolina
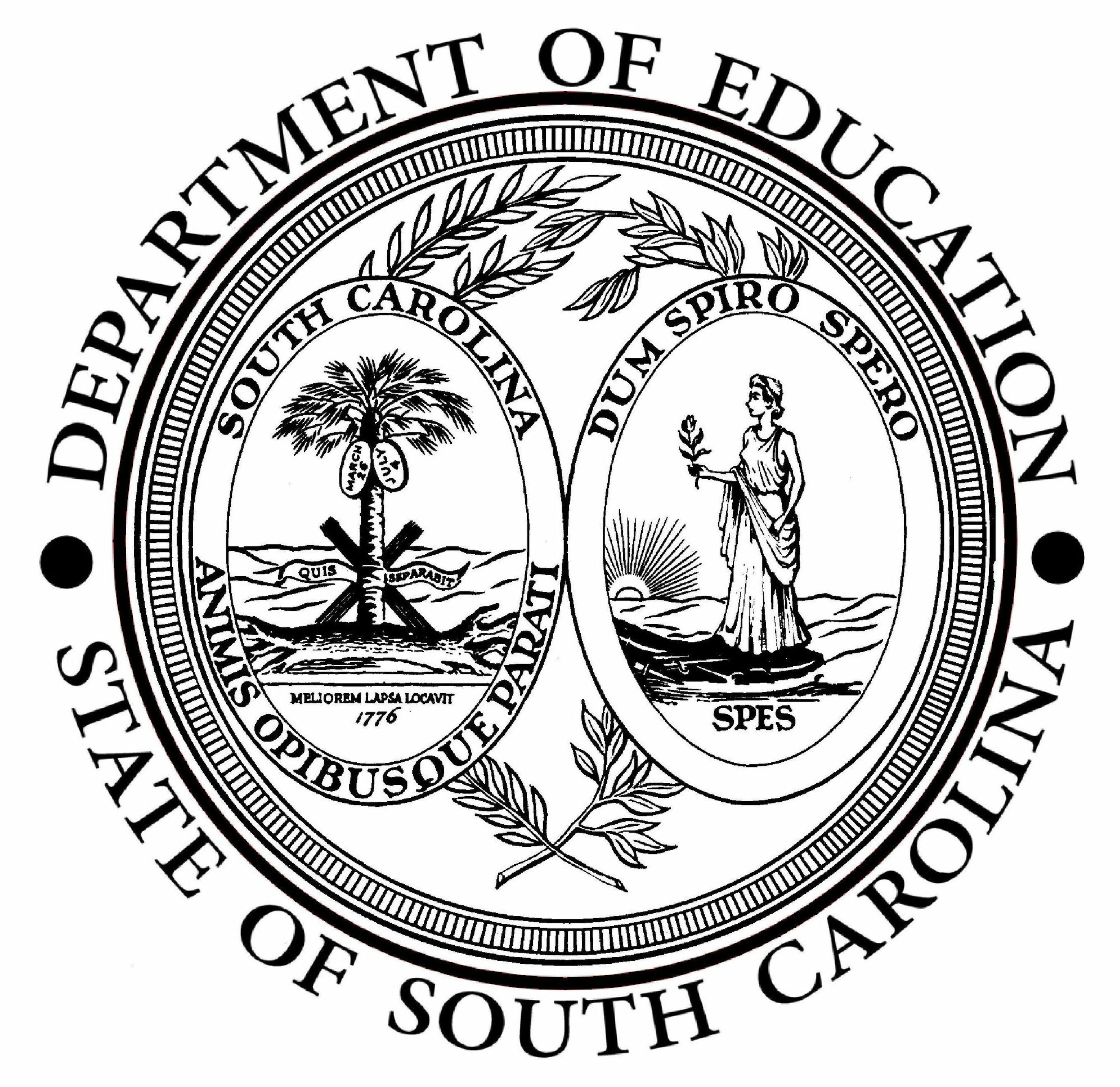

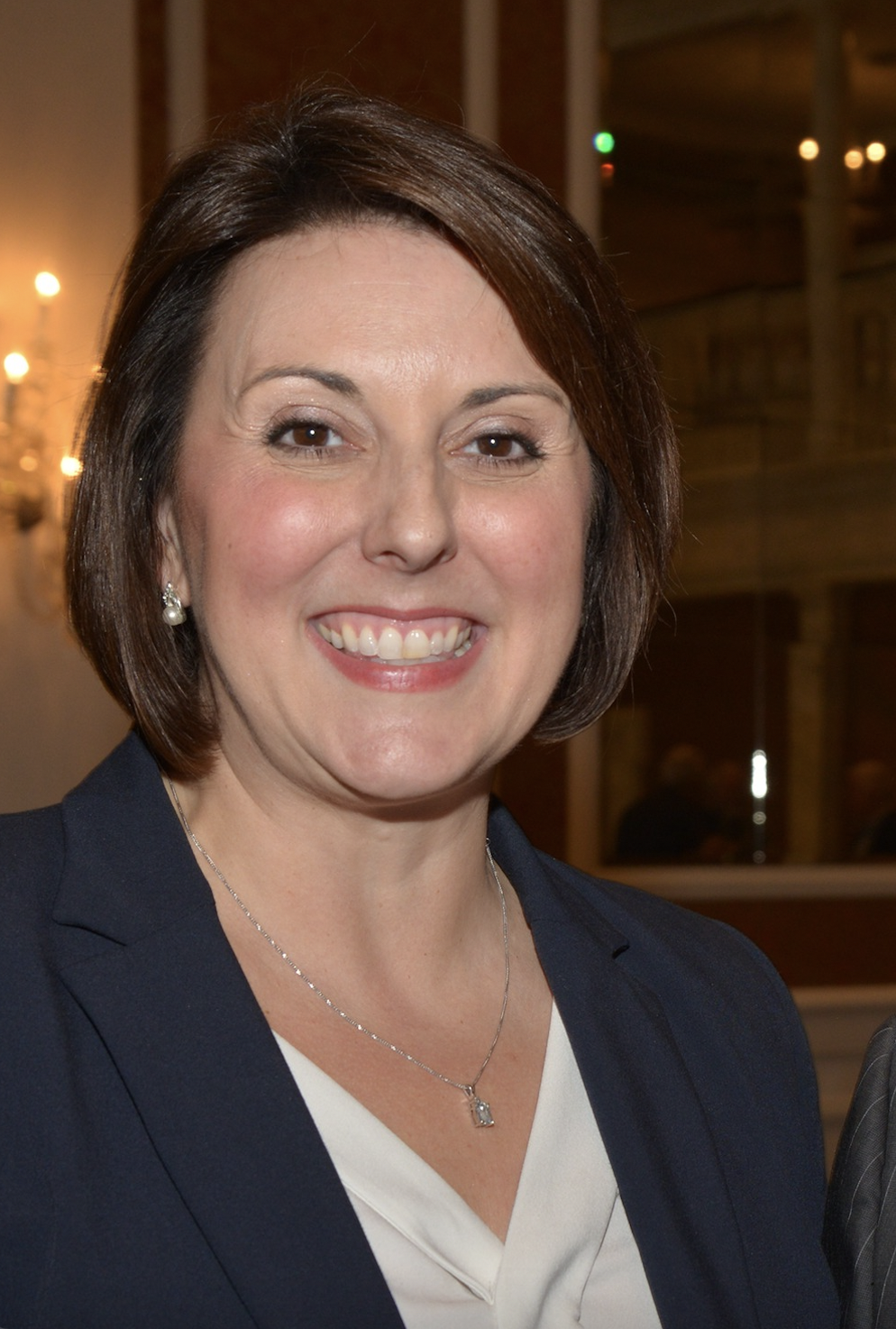
- Incumbent; Ellen Weaver since January 11, 2023
- Seat: Columbia
- Appointer: Elected at-large
- Term length: Four years, no term limit
- Constituting instrument: Constitution of South Carolina
- Inaugural holder: Justus K. Jillson
- Formation: June 7, 1868 (158 years ago)
- Salary: $214,000

The South Carolina superintendent of education is the executive of the South Carolina Department of Education. The superintendent is responsible for overseeing the 1.5 billion dollar budget of the department and ensuring that schools and schools districts are abiding by federal and state laws as well as the requirements established by the department. The superintendent is elected at-large and serves a term of four years. The position has no term limits. The current superintendent of education is Ellen Weaver, a Republican, who was elected in 2022 upon the retirement of Molly Spearman.

== History ==
=== 19th and 20th centuries ===
The position of South Carolina superintendent of education was created after the ratification of the Constitution of 1868 established the first public school system in the state. Justus K. Jillson was the first superintendent, serving from 1868 until 1876. Jillson issued the first Annual Report of the State Superintendent of Education of the State of South Carolina, which was continued by many of his successors. In 1868, the term of superintendent of education was two years, but beginning with the election of 1926, it was expanded to four years.

In 1876, John Tolbert, a Republican, was elected to be Jillson's successor. However, as Democrats regained power in South Carolina through extensive voter fraud, the results of the election of 1876 were contested. Ultimately, Democrats seized power and installed Hugh Smith Thompson as superintendent instead. While Jillson advocated for school integration, Thompson ensured that schools remained segregated, though he did institute reforms regarding teacher training and attempted to equally fund black and white schools.

In 1900, superintendent John J. McMahan argued that each county supports its schools with "practically no help from the state." Thus, he argued, it was a misnomer to argue that South Carolina had a system of public education. He advocated to drastically increase the state funding of schools and that schools must be forced to meet a minimum requirement of state standards. In the following two decades, the South Carolina General Assembly increased funding for public schools, such as the High School Act passed in 1907. Also in the 1900s, superintendents Swearanger and Hope advocated for increased taxes to fund education, especially regarding teacher professional development and certification. Hope commented, "Why are so many incompetent teachers employed?" Both Swearanger and Hope reshaped the methods by which teachers gained certification, implementing a uniform examination system across the state.

In the 1950s, the General Assembly's Educational Finance Commission consolidated school districts, built new schools, and established a statewide transportation system for schools, thus increasing the state government's and superintendent of education's oversight of public schools. Superintendent Jesse T. Anderson managed the "equalization" schools by granting more money to black schools through a tax advocated by Governor James F. Byrnes, though the state refused to integrate until forced by the Brown v. Board of Education decision; it wasn't until nine years after the decision that black students first entered a formerly-white school. Some schools remained segregated into the 1970s. In the late 1950s and 1960s, Anderson advocated for an increase in funding for math and science programs after the Space Race spawned fears regarding the American academic competition with the Soviet Union.

By 1970s, public schools had become the largest budget item for the South Carolina government, consuming nearly 50% of the tax dollar. In 1977, Superintendent Cyril Busbee argued that modern schools required so much money was because they no longer are limited to only teaching factual information.

Busbee argued:

Schools are required to operate recreation and cultural centers in the form of athletic contests, movies, dances, drama, band concerts, and art exhibits. Our schools are challenged with the duty of providing moral guidance, since many patrons insist that the school is responsible for the morality of the younger generation; our schools are expected to serve as health centers; our schools are restaurants; our schools are job-training centers.

In the 1970s, the budget of the State Board of Education had risen to $100,000,000 annually, and as a stipulation of receiving greater funding, the state superintendent and department of education were tasked with requiring "defined minimum standards" for courses.

=== 21st century ===
Into the modern era and the 21st century, superintendents have managed greater funding than ever before, and have fought against issues like teacher shortages, low pay, large class sizes, and curriculum disagreements (e.g., Critical race theory).

In 2018, voters decided on a proposed constitutional amendment that would allow the governor to select the superintendent of education instead of being popularly elected. The measure failed, with 60.1% of people voting "no." That year the General Assembly passed a law requiring all candidates for the office of superintendent to hold a master's degree in education or financial management.

In 2021, Governor Henry McMaster requested that Superintendent Molly Spearman investigate accusations of a school in Fort Mill accused of distributing pornographic materials in the form of a book titled Gender Queer. After investigation, Spearman stated that it is the responsibility of schools and districts to pay for and select books they stock on library shelves, though the book was still removed.

In 2022, Spearman announced that local school districts in Florence, South Carolina would be consolidated after concerns over financial instability. Also in 2022, Spearman ordered the investigation and penalties against Lexington School District Two, which was in major violation of state law.

=== Last election ===
In the most recent election in 2022, Republican Ellen Weaver defeated Democrat Lisa Ellis in the general election.

South Carolina Superintendent of Education election, 2022
| Party | Candidate | Votes | % |
|---|---|---|---|
| Republican | Ellen Weaver | 934,802 | 55.5% |
| Democratic | Lisa Ellis (Note: Ellis ran as both a candidate for the Democratic and Alliance parties. Her vote total is a combination of votes cast for both parties.) | 719,918 | 42.7% |
| Green | Patricia Mickle | 27,355 | 1.6% |
| Total votes | | 1,683,812 | 100% |
| Republican hold | | | |

== Duties ==
In addition to managing the 1.5 billion dollar budget of the South Carolina Department of Education, the superintendent has the authority to investigate and penalize and school, school district, or school board in violation of state or federal law or of mandates from the department. According to the South Carolina code of laws, The State Superintendent of Education:

1. Is the administrative officer to the State Board of Education.
2. Manages all public school funds provided by the State and Federal Governments.
3. Organizes, staffs and administers the State Department of Education
4. Keeps the public informed as to the problems and needs of the public schools
5. Must have printed and distributed such bulletins, manuals, and circulars as he may deem necessary for the professional improvement of teachers
6. Administers all policies and procedures adopted by the State Board of Education.
7. Assumes such other responsibilities assigned by the State Board of Education.

=== Qualifications and terms of office ===
In addition to being 18 years old and a registered voter, the superintendent of education must possess one of the following:

1. a master's degree "and substantive and broad-based experience in the field of public education"
2. a master's degree "and substantive and broad-based experience in operational and financial management in any field of expertise."

The superintendent is elected at-large by the voters of South Carolina and serves a four-year term, coterminous with the governor. There are no term limits. If a vacancy occurs in the office of superintendent, the governor will appoint a superintendent, with the advice and consent of the senate, who will serve the remainder of the term.

== List of superintendents ==
Superintendents of education of the State of South Carolina
| No. | Superintendent | Party | Term | Time in office |
|---|---|---|---|---|
| 1 | Justus K. Jillson | Republican | 1868 - 1876 | 8 years |
| 2 | Hugh Smith Thompson | Democratic | 1876 - 1884 | 8 years |
| 3 | Asbury Coward | Democratic | 1882 - 1885 | 4 years |
| 4 | James H. Rice | Democratic | 1886 - 1890 | 4 years |
| 5 | W. D. Mayfield | Democratic | 1890 - 1898 | 8 years |
| 6 | John J. McMahan | Democratic | 1898 - 1902 | 4 years |
| 7 | Oscar B. Martin | Democratic | 1902 - 1908 | 6 years |
| 8 | John E. Swearingen | Democratic | 1908 - 1922 | 14 years |
| 9 | James H. Hope | Democratic | 1922 - 1947 | 25 years |
| 10 | Jesse T. Anderson | Democratic | 1947 - 1967 | 20 years |
| 11 | Cyril B. Busbee | Democratic | 1967 - 1979 | 12 years |
| 12 | Charlie G. Williams | Democratic | 1979 - 1991 | 12 years |
| 13 | Barbara S. Nielsen | Republican | 1991 - 1999 | 8 years |
| 14 | Inez Tenenbaum | Democratic | 1999 - 2007 | 8 years |
| 15 | Jim Rex | Democratic | 2007 - 2011 | 4 years |
| 16 | Mick Zais | Republican | 2011 - 2015 | 4 years |
| 17 | Molly Spearman | Republican | 2015 - 2023 | 8 years |
| 18 | Ellen Weaver | Republican | 2023 - Incumbent | 3 years, 240 days (Note: As of September 8, 2026) |
