= J. Hendrix McLane =

American politician (1848–1893)

J. Hendrix McLane (born March 23, 1848, in Jackson County, Georgia – died 1893) was an American politician. He ran for governor of South Carolina in the 1882 South Carolina gubernatorial election as a Greenback Labor Party candidate. He belonged to several political parties during his career, and was a reformer for a time in the Republican Party. He advocated for the rights of African Americans. He also campaigned for white agrarian poor of the Southeastern United States.

Yale University has a collection of his papers.
