= Barry Wynn =

American businessman (born 1945)

Chairman of the South Carolina Republican Party
- In office May 1990 – May 1993
- Preceded by: Van Hipp Jr.
- Succeeded by: Henry McMaster

Personal details
- Born: June 1, 1945 (age 81) Spartanburg, South Carolina, U.S.
- Party: Republican
- Occupation: Financial advisor

Barry Wynn (born June 1, 1945) is a former chairman of the South Carolina Republican Party.

Wynn is the CEO of South Colonial Group, Inc, which markets private trusts and investment advice to companies and executives in the Southeast's shrinking textile industry. He was the state finance chair of the first President Bush's failed 1992 reelection campaign; then-Senator John Ashcroft consulted Wynn about whether or not he should seek the GOP's presidential nomination in 2000. Wynn also has been finance chair of the campaigns of Senator Jim DeMint.
