= Mick Zais =

American educator and politician (born 1946)

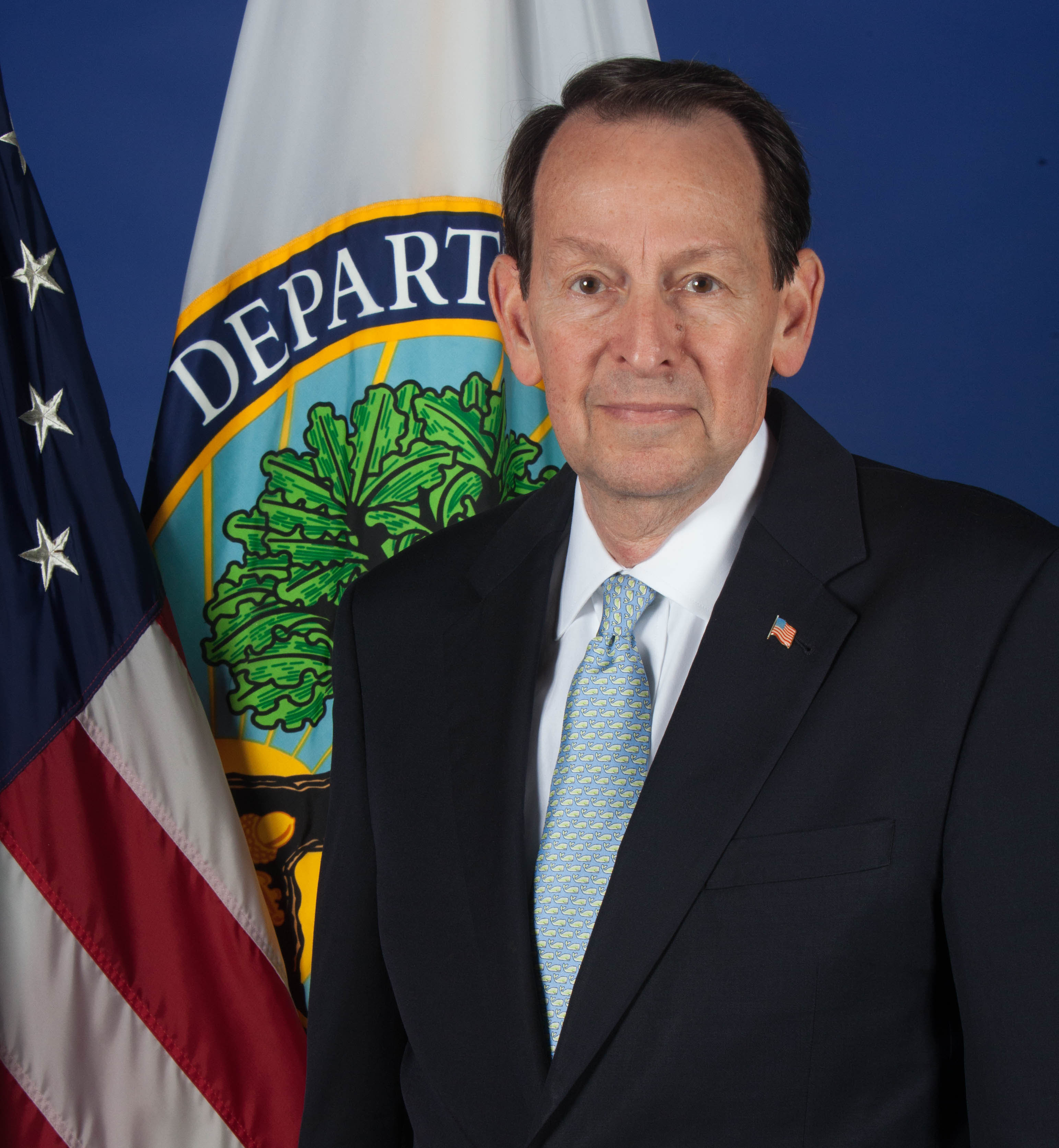
- Official portrait, 2018

Acting United States Secretary of Education
- In office January 8, 2021 – January 20, 2021
- President: Donald Trump
- Preceded by: Betsy DeVos
- Succeeded by: Phil Rosenfelt (acting)

United States Deputy Secretary of Education
- In office May 17, 2018 – January 20, 2021
- President: Donald Trump
- Preceded by: Jim Shelton
- Succeeded by: Cindy Marten

South Carolina Superintendent of Education
- In office January 12, 2011 – January 13, 2015
- Governor: Nikki Haley
- Preceded by: Jim Rex
- Succeeded by: Molly Spearman

President of Newberry College
- In office 2000–2010
- Preceded by: John Hudgens
- Succeeded by: Scott Koerwer

Personal details
- Born: Mitchell McGeever Zais; December 10, 1946 (age 79) Fort Bragg, North Carolina, U.S.
- Party: Republican
- Education: United States Military Academy (BS); University of Washington (MS, PhD); United States Army Command and General Staff College (MA)

Military service
- Allegiance: United States
- Branch/service: United States Army
- Rank: Brigadier General

Mitchell McGeever "Mick" Zais (born December 10, 1946) is an American education official and former general who served as the acting United States secretary of education. He previously served as the 17th South Carolina Superintendent of Education from 2011 to 2015. Before winning the election as superintendent, he served as President of Newberry College for ten years. Prior to that he reached the rank of Brigadier General in the United States Army.

On January 7, 2021, Education Secretary Betsy DeVos submitted her resignation to the President of the United States because of the 2021 storming of the United States Capitol. As deputy secretary, Zais succeeded DeVos as acting secretary.

== Early life and education ==
Zais was born in Fort Bragg, North Carolina. He earned a Bachelor of Science degree in engineering from West Point, a Master of Science and a doctorate in social psychology and organizational behavior both from the University of Washington and a Master of Arts in military history from the School of Advanced Military Studies at the United States Army Command and General Staff College.

== Career ==
=== Military ===
During his military career, Zais served in a wide variety of infantry units in Vietnam, the United States, and Korea. He commanded two rifle companies, an infantry battalion, a light infantry brigade, and served as deputy commanding general at Fort Riley, Kansas. Zais was also the Pentagon's Chief of War Plans. As an assistant professor at West Point for three years, he taught organizational behavior, leadership, and management consulting.

Zais served as a White House aide and in Panama as executive assistant to the four-star commander of all U.S. forces in Central and South America. In Kuwait, he was commanding general of U.S. and Allied forces. He also served as commanding general of Operation Provide Refuge, the task force that cared for 4,000 Kosovo refugees who entered the United States. Zais's last military assignment was as Chief of Staff of the U.S. Army Reserve Command, the headquarters that administers the 184,000 part-time Reservists, 9,000 civilian employees, and 11,000 full-time military members of the Army Reserve. At the time of his retirement from the military Zais held the rank of Brigadier General.

Zais's military awards and decorations include the Distinguished Service Medal; the Defense Superior Service Medal; the Legion of Merit; the Bronze Star; the Meritorious Service Medal; the Air Medal; the Republic of Vietnam Campaign Medal; the Humanitarian Service Medal; the Ranger, Airborne, and Combat Infantryman's Badges; and the South Carolina Meritorious Service Medal.

=== Newberry College ===
Zais became the president of Newberry College in August 2000. During his time at Newberry, both enrollment and endowment nearly doubled. During the last three years of his tenure, Newberry College was named by U.S. News & World Report as one of America's best colleges. He retired in June 2010, just prior to running for state Superintendent of Education.

=== South Carolina Superintendent of Education ===
==== 2010 election ====
Zais ran in a crowded field for the Republican nomination. Zais was the top vote getter in the primary but did not clear the necessary 50% threshold. Zais defeated Elizabeth Moffly in the run-off. He faced Democrat Frank Holleman, Libertarian Tim Moultrie and two minor party candidates in the November general election. Zais won with 51% of the vote.

==== Tenure and retirement ====
Zais opposed implementation of the Common Core State Standards Initiative in South Carolina and withdrew from the state's participation in the federal Race to the Top grant competition. Zais supported the state's Governor to have the power to appoint the State Superintendent of Education, a position shared by a former Democratic Superintendent as well as his successor in the position. By the end of Zais's tenure, South Carolina's on-time high school graduation rates hit an all-time high of over 80% of students finishing within four-years. Zais decided not to run for re-election and endorsed Sally Atwater, widow of Lee Atwater, as his replacement. In the 2014 election, Republican educator and former legislator, Molly Mitchell Spearman, won by a wide margin and replaced Zais as South Carolina's State Superintendent of Education.

=== U.S. Department of Education ===
On October 5, 2017, President Donald Trump announced his intention to nominate Zais to serve as the United States Deputy Secretary of Education. He was confirmed by the United States Senate by a vote of 50–48 on May 16, 2018.

After Betsy DeVos resigned as Secretary of Education on January 7, 2021, after the storming of the United States Capitol, Zais assumed the office of secretary on January 8. He remained in the position until January 20, 2021, when President Joe Biden nominated Phil Rosenfelt, the former Acting General Counsel of the United States Department of Education, to serve in an acting capacity as Secretary of Education until Miguel Cardona, the President's nominee, was confirmed by the Senate.

In June 2023, Zais endorsed Tim Scott in the 2024 United States presidential election.In September 2025, Zais was named the government relations chair for the Boston 2026 World Expo.

== Personal life ==
Zais has a daughter, Ashley, who was Miss South Carolina USA in 2007. His father, Melvin Zais, was a four-star general in the United States Army.

He served as president of the American Philatelic Society a non-profit organization focused on philately or stamp collecting, from August 2016 until his appointment as deputy secretary of education in May 2018. At the time he noted that with his role at the Department of Education he would "have to resign from all boards and all other employment."

Academic offices
Preceded by Peter L. French	President of Newberry College; 2000–2010	Succeeded by Scott Koerwer
Party political offices
Preceded by Karen Floyd	Republican nominee for South Carolina Superintendent of Education; 2010	Succeeded by Molly Spearman
Political offices
Preceded by Jim Rex	South Carolina Superintendent of Education; 2011–2015	Succeeded by Molly Spearman
Preceded by Jim Shelton	United States Deputy Secretary of Education; 2018–2021	Succeeded by Denise L. Carter; Acting
Preceded by Betsy DeVos	United States Secretary of Education; Acting; 2021	Succeeded by Phil Rosenfelt; Acting
