= 2026 South Carolina elections =

- November 3, 2026

Elections were held in the state of South Carolina on November 3, 2026, alongside the nationwide midterm elections. Elections were held for a U.S. Senate seat, governor, as well as other statewide executive offices, all 7 of the state's U.S. House of Representatives seats and all seats in the State House. Primary elections were held on June 9, 2026, with runoff elections held on June 23.

A solidly red state, South Carolina has consistently supported Republicans in recent decades. Democrats have not won South Carolina on the presidential level since 1976, when Jimmy Carter won most of the Deep South. Democrats have not won any statewide office in South Carolina since 2006, when Jim Rex was elected as Superintendent of Education. Democrats fielded candidates for all open federal and state offices for the first time in decades.

== United States Senate ==
Incumbent Republican senator Lindsey Graham, who was re-elected in 2020 with 54.4% of the vote, ran for re-election to a fifth term in office. He won the Republican primary with 56.8% of the vote, thereby avoiding a runoff. After Graham's death on July 11, 2026, his sister, incumbent Darline Graham, became the Republican nominee after winning an August special Republican primary runoff. The Democratic nominee is Annie Andrews, who won the nomination with 61.5% of the vote. The Libertarian nominee is Kasie Whitener and the Constitution Party nominee is Mark Hackett. Catherine Fleming Bruce is running as a write-in candidate.

== United States House of Representatives ==
All of South Carolina's 7 seats in the United States House of Representatives are up for election in 2026.

6 seats are currently held by Republicans, and 1 is currently held by a Democrat.

== State executive ==
=== Governor ===
Incumbent Republican governor Henry McMaster, who was re-elected with 58.04% of the vote in 2022, is term-limited and cannot seek re-election a third full term in office.

Attorney general Alan Wilson won the Republican nomination with 68.6% of the vote in a runoff election over lieutenant governor Pamela Evette. Evette won the initial primary election with 29% of the vote to Wilson's 26%; congressman Ralph Norman (17%), businessman Rom Reddy (14%), and congresswoman Nancy Mace (11%) were all eliminated in the primary. State senator Josh Kimbrell dropped out of the race six days before the primary and endorsed Wilson. The Democratic primary was won by state representative Jermaine Johnson with just under 60% of the vote. Walid Hakim is the Green Party nominee and Micheal Addison is the United Citizens Party nominee.

=== Attorney General ===
Incumbent Republican attorney general Alan Wilson, who was re-elected unopposed in 2022, declined to seek re-election to a fifth term in order to run for governor.

Eighth Judicial Circuit solicitor David Stumbo won the nomination with 55.75% of the vote in a runoff over state senator Stephen Goldfinch. First Judicial Circuit solicitor David Pascoe was eliminated in the initial primary election. The general election will match Stumbo against Richard Hricik, a lawyer who won the Democratic primary unopposed.

=== Secretary of State ===
Incumbent Republican secretary of state Mark Hammond, who was re-elected in 2022 with 63.3% of the vote, is running for a seventh term in office; he won the Republican primary unopposed. The Democratic nominee is Jason Belton, vice president of the Greater Columbia Central Labor Council. He narrowly defeated real estate agent Edwina Winter in the primary with 50.6% of the vote.

=== Treasurer ===
Incumbent Republican treasurer Curtis Loftis, who was re-elected in 2022 with 79.7% of the vote, is running for re-election to a fifth term in office. The South Carolina Senate voted to remove Loftis from office in a 33–8 vote in April 2025 following his involvement in a $1.8 billion accounting error, but the House did not vote on his removal before the end of their legislative session.

Loftis won the Republican primary unopposed. The Democratic primary was won by banker Vincent Coe, who carried 55.8% of the vote against former deputy state treasurer and former South Carolina Democratic Party chair Trav Robertson Jr.

=== Comptroller General ===
Republican Comptroller Richard Eckstrom, who was re-elected unopposed in 2022, left office on April 30, 2023, following the discovery of a $3.5 billion accounting error. Governor Henry McMaster appointed Democrat Brian J. Gaines to serve the remainder of Eckstrom's term. He is not running for a full term.

=== Superintendent of Education ===
Republican Superintendent Ellen Weaver was first elected in 2022 with 55.5% of the vote. She is running for re-election to a second term in office.

Lisa Ellis, the Democratic nominee for Superintendent of Education in 2022, ran in 2026. She was defeated in the Democratic primary by Sylvia Wright.

=== Commissioner of Agriculture ===
Incumbent Republican commissioner Hugh Weathers was re-elected in 2022 with 77.6% of the vote. He is retiring.

Cody Simpson, a fifth generation farmer – endorsed by President Donald Trump and Governor Henry McMaster – is the Republican candidate for South Carolina Commissioner of Agriculture. Simpson recently completed service as the South Carolina State Executive Director of the USDA Farm Service Agency.

Simpson will face DeShawn Blanding, former policy analyst for the U.S. House Committee on Agriculture[10], in the November 3 general election.

== State House of Representatives ==
All 124 seats in the South Carolina House of Representatives are up for election in 2026.

Republicans currently hold 88 seats in the State House, and Democrats hold 36.

== See also ==
- Elections in South Carolina
- Politics of South Carolina
- Political party strength in South Carolina
