= 2022 South Carolina elections =

- November 8, 2022

South Carolina state elections in 2022 were held on Tuesday, November 8, 2022. All of South Carolina's executive officers were up for election, as well as all of South Carolina's seven seats in the United States House of Representatives.

== United States Congress: US House and Senate races ==
=== House of Representatives ===
District results: Republican: 50–60%; 60–70%; >90%; Democratic: 60–70%

All of South Carolina's seven seats in the United States House of Representatives were up for election in 2022.

=== Results ===
District	Republican		Democratic		Others		Total		Result
District	Votes	%	Votes	%	Votes	%	Votes	%	Result
District 1	153,757	56.39%	115,796	42.47%	3,128	1.15%	272,681	100.0%	Republican hold
District 2	147,699	60.01%	98,081	39.85%	346	0.14%	246,126	100.0%	Republican hold
District 3	189,971	97.64%	0	0.0%	4,598	2.36%	194,569	100.0%	Republican hold
District 4	165,607	90.81%	0	0.0%	16,758	9.19%	182,365	100.0%	Republican hold
District 5	154,725	64.01%	83,299	34.46%	3,683	1.53%	241,707	100.0%	Republican hold
District 6	79,879	37.85%	130,923	62.04%	226	0.11%	211,028	100.0%	Democratic hold
District 7	164,440	64.77%	89,030	35.07%	395	0.16%	253,865	100.0%	Republican hold
Total	1,056,078	65.91%	517,129	32.27%	29,134	1.82%	1,602,341	100.0%	

Popular vote
Republican	65.91%
Democratic	32.27%
Other	1.82%

House seats
Republican	85.71%
Democratic	14.29%

=== Senate ===
Democratic primary candidates included Krystle Matthews, Catherine Fleming Bruce and Angela Geter. Fleming Bruce received the highest number of votes, landing her in a runoff with Matthews, which Matthews won.

Final results by county: Scott: 50–60%; 60–70%; 70–80%; Matthews: 50–60%; 60–70%

2022 United States Senate election in South Carolina
Party	Candidate	Votes	%	±%
Republican	Tim Scott (incumbent)	1,066,274	62.88%	+2.31%
Democratic	Krystle Matthews	627,616	37.01%	+0.08%
Write-in		1,812	0.11%	+0.02%
Total votes		1,695,702	100.00%	N/A
Republican hold				

== Governor and lieutenant governor ==
Final results by county: McMaster: 50–60%; 60–70%; 70–80%; Cunningham: 40–50%; 50–60%; 60–70%

2022 South Carolina gubernatorial election
Party	Candidate	Votes	%	±%
Republican	Henry McMaster (incumbent); Pamela Evette (incumbent)	988,501	58.04%	+4.08%
Democratic	Joe Cunningham; Tally Parham Casey	692,691	40.67%	−5.25%
Libertarian	Morgan Bruce Reeves; Jessica Ethridge	20,826	1.22%	N/A
Write-in		1,174	0.07%	
Total votes		1,703,192	100.00%	N/A
Turnout		1,718,626	50.86%	
Registered electors		3,379,089		
Republican hold				

== Attorney General ==
Final results by county: Wilson: >90%

Incumbent Alan Wilson ran unopposed in the general.

2022 South Carolina Attorney General election
Party	Candidate	Votes	%
Republican	Alan Wilson (incumbent)	1,223,080	97.32%
Write-ins	Write-in	33,709	2.68%
Total votes		1,256,789	100.00%
Republican hold			

== Secretary of State ==
Final results by county: Hammond: 50–60%; 60–70%; 70–80%; Butler: 50–60%; 60–70%

2022 South Carolina Secretary of State election
Party	Candidate	Votes	%
Republican	Mark Hammond (incumbent)	1,071,451	63.33%
Democratic	Rosemounda Peggy Butler	619,341	36.61%
Write-in		1,109	0.07%
Total votes		1,691,901	100.00%
Republican hold			

== Treasurer ==
Final results by county: Loftis: 50–60%; 60–70%; 70–80%; 80–90%; >90%

2022 South Carolina Treasurer election
Party	Candidate	Votes	%	±%
Republican	Curtis Loftis (incumbent)	1,129,961	79.67%	+23.72%
Alliance	Sarah E. Work	281,695	19.86%	+18.33%
	Write-in	6,630	0.47%	+0.43%
Total votes		1,418,286	100.00%	
Republican hold				

== Comptroller General ==
2022 South Carolina Comptroller General election
- November 8, 2022
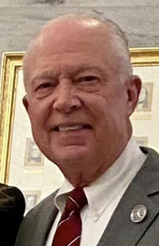

Candidate	Richard Eckstrom
Party	Republican	Write-ins
popular vote	1,229,879	22,407
Percentage	98.21%	1.79%
- County results Eckstrom: >90%

2022 South Carolina Comptroller General election
Party	Candidate	Votes	%
Republican	Richard Eckstrom (incumbent)	1,229,879	98.21%
Write-ins	Write-in	22,407	1.79%
Total votes		1,252,286	100.00%
Republican hold			

== Superintendent of Education ==
=== Primary elections ===
Republican primary results
Party	Candidate	Votes	%
Republican	Kathy Maness	103,608	30.6
Republican	Ellen Weaver	79,077	23.3
Republican	Travis Bedson	47,241	13.9
Republican	Bryan Chapman	42,498	12.5
Republican	Kizzi Gibson	37,743	11.1
Republican	Lynda Leventis-Wells	28,755	8.5
Total votes		338,922	100.0

Republican primary runoff
Party	Candidate	Votes	%
Republican	Ellen Weaver	111,643	63.9
Republican	Kathy Maness	63,080	36.1
Total votes		174,723	100

Superintendent of Education Democratic Primary 2022
Party	Candidate	Votes	%
Democratic	Lisa Ellis	87,229	50.1%
Democratic	Gary Burgess	54,317	31.2%
Democratic	Jerry Govan Jr.	32,473	18.7%
Total votes		174,019	100%

=== General election ===
2022 South Carolina Superintendent of Education election
- November 8, 2022
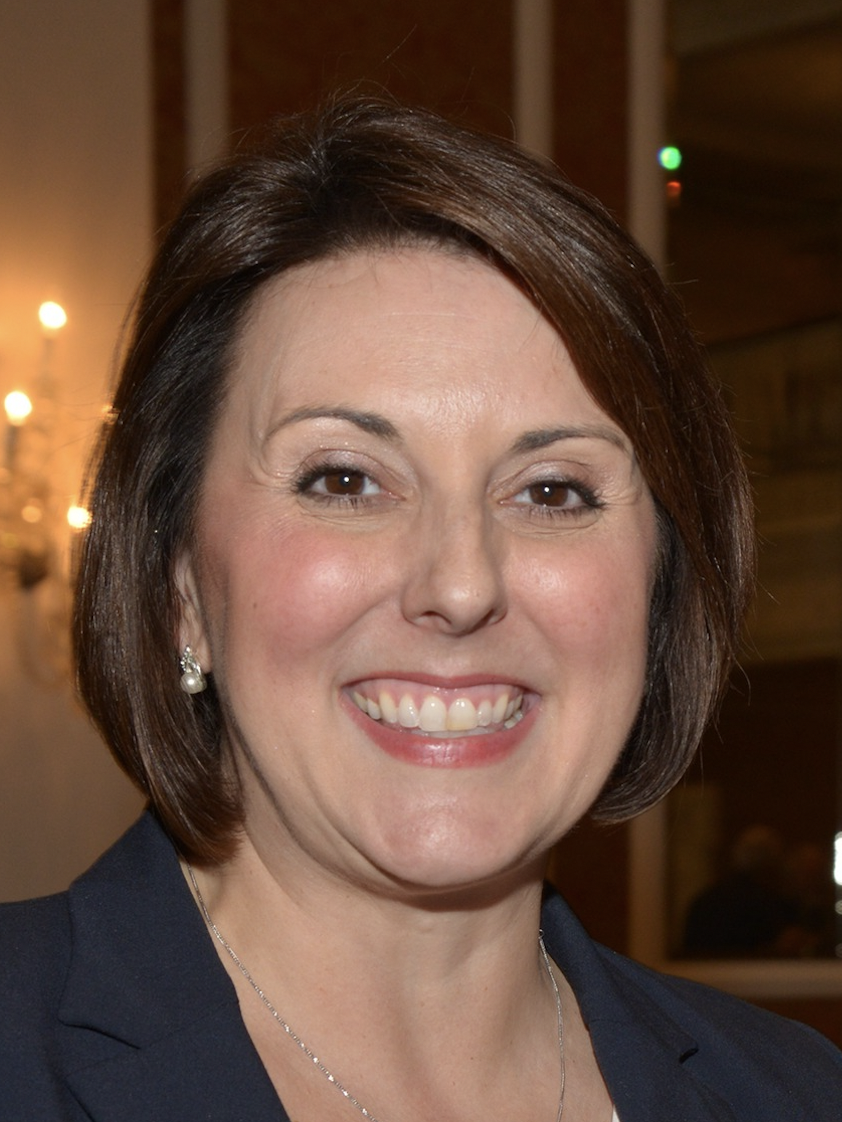

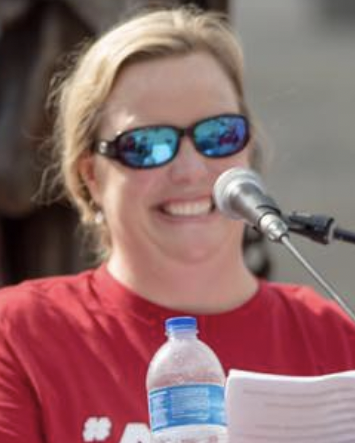
Candidate	Ellen Weaver	Lisa Ellis
Party	Republican	Democratic
Alliance		Alliance
popular vote	937,493	722,013
Percentage	55.52%	42.76%
- County results Weaver: 50–60% 60–70% 70–80% Ellis: 50–60% 60–70%

2022 South Carolina Superintendent of Education election
Party	Candidate	Votes	%
Republican	Ellen Weaver	937,493	55.52%
Democratic	Lisa Ellis (Note: Ellis ran as both a candidate for the Democratic and Alliance parties. Her vote total is a combination of votes cast for both parties.)	722,013	42.76%
Green	Patricia M. Mickel	27,468	1.63%
Write-in		1,744	0.10%
Total votes		1,688,718	100.00%
Republican hold			

== Commissioner of Agriculture ==
2022 South Carolina Commissioner of Agriculture election
- November 8, 2022
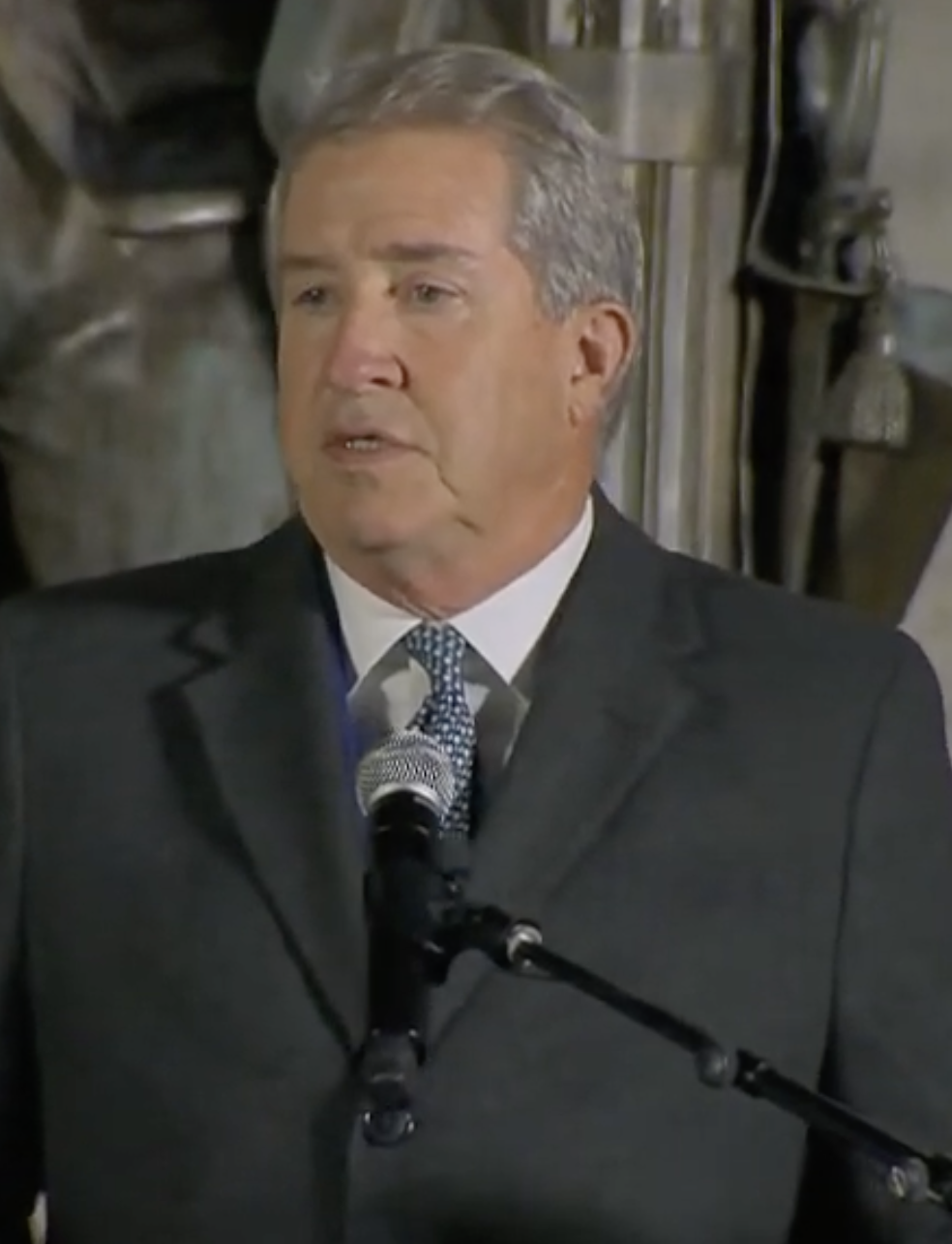

Candidate	Hugh Weathers	David Edmond	Chris Nelums
Party	Republican	Green	United Citizens
popular vote	1,085,139	213,219	95,625
Percentage	77.60%	15.25%	6.84%
- Weathers 30-40% 40–50% 50–60% 60–70% 70–80% 80–90% >90% Edmond: 30-40% 40–50% 50–60% Nelums: 30-40% 40–50% 50–60% 60–70% No Votes

2022 South Carolina Commissioner of Agriculture election
Party	Candidate	Votes	%
Republican	Hugh Weathers (incumbent)	1,085,139	77.60%
Green	David Edmond	213,219	15.25%
United Citizens	Chris Nelums	95,625	6.84%
Write-in		4,409	0.32%
Total votes		1,398,392	100.00%
Republican hold			

== State legislature ==

Results by State House districts

Winners:

Republican hold
Democratic hold
Republican gain
Democratic gain

All 124 seats in the South Carolina House of Representatives were up for election in 2022.

Parties	Popular vote			Seats			
Parties	Vote	%	Change	2020	2022	+/−	Strength
South Carolina Republican Party	1,027,276	68.96%	+6.34%	81	88	▲7	70.97%
South Carolina Democratic Party	436,566	29.31%	−5.49%	43	36	▼7	29.03%
Write-in	18,402	1.24%	−0.05%	—	—	—	—
Libertarian Party of South Carolina	5,375	0.36%	−0.42%	—	—	—	—
Independent	1,080	0.07%	+0.04%	—	—	—	—
American Party of South Carolina	564	0.04%	−0.28%	—	—	—	—
South Carolina Green Party	456	0.03%	+0.02%	—	—	—	—
Totals	1,489,719	100.0%	—	124	124	Steady	100.0%
Source: South Carolina Election Commission

Popular vote
Republican	68.96%
Democratic	29.31%
Other	1.74%

House seats
Republican	70.97%
Democratic	29.03%

== Ballot measures ==
=== Amendment 1 ===
The amendment increased the General Reserve Fund from 5% to 7% of state general fund revenues from the previous fiscal year. The increase was set to be phased in incrementally by one-half of one percent each year.

Amendment 1
- Must Section 36(A), Article III of the Constitution of this State, relating to the General Reserve Fund, be amended so as to provide that the General Reserve Fund of five percent of general fund revenue of the latest completed fiscal year must be increased each year by one-half of one percent of the general fund revenue of the latest completed fiscal year until it equals seven percent of such revenues?

Results
Choice	Votes	%
Yes	947,610	61.89%
No	583,583	38.11%
Valid votes	1,531,193	100.00%
Invalid or blank votes	0	0.00%
Total votes	1,531,193	100.00%
- County results Yes 60–70% 50–60%

=== Amendment 2 ===
The amendment increased the Capital Reserve Fund annual funding requirement from 2% to 3% of state general fund revenue.

Amendment 2
- Must Section 36(B), Article III of the Constitution of this State be amended so as to provide that the Capital Reserve Fund of two percent of the general fund revenue of the latest completed fiscal year be increased to three percent of the general fund revenue of the latest completed fiscal year and to provide that the first use of the Capital Reserve Fund must be to offset midyear budget reductions?

Results
Choice	Votes	%
Yes	973,178	62.46%
No	584,911	37.54%
Valid votes	1,558,089	100.00%
Invalid or blank votes	0	0.00%
Total votes	1,558,089	100.00%
- County results Yes 60–70% 50–60%

== See also ==
- Elections in South Carolina
- 2022 United States elections
