= 2026 South Carolina State Treasurer election =

- November 3, 2026
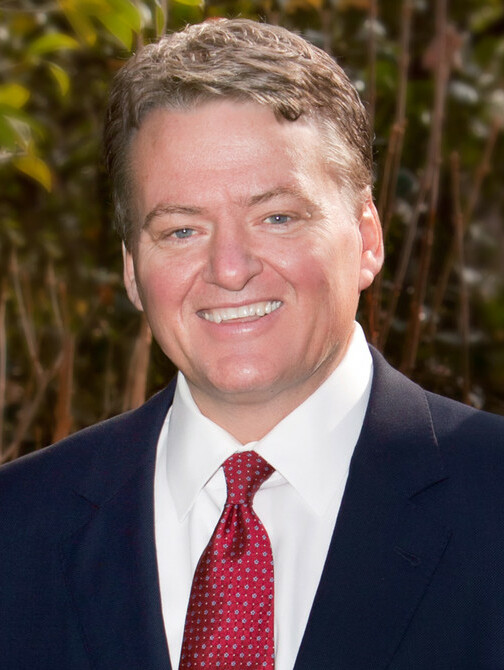

Nominee	Curtis Loftis	Vincent Coe
Party	Republican	Democratic
Popular vote	1,061,819	958,278
Percentage	52.5%	47.4%
- County results Hammond: 50–60% 60–70% 70–80% Belton: 50–60% 60–70% 70–80%
State Treasurer before election
Curtis Loftis
Republican
Elected State Treasurer
Curtis Loftis
Republican

The 2026 South Carolina State Treasurer election took place on November 3, 2026, to elect the South Carolina State Treasurer. Incumbent Republican State Treasurer Curtis Loftis ran for re-election to a fourth term in office, defeating Democrat Vincent Coe in the general election.

== Republican primary ==
=== Candidates ===
==== Nominee ====
- Curtis Loftis, incumbent state treasurer

== Democratic primary ==
=== Candidates ===
==== Nominee ====
- Vincent Coe, banker and nominee for state representative in 2022

==== Eliminated in primary ====
- Trav Robertson, former chair of the South Carolina Democratic Party (2017–2023)

=== Results ===
Primary results by county: Coe: 50–60%; 60–70%; Robertson: 50–60%

Democratic primary results
Party	Candidate	Votes	%
Democratic	Vincent Coe	195,498	55.8
Democratic	Trav Robertson	155,080	44.2
Total votes		350,578	100.0

== General election ==
=== Results ===
2026 South Carolina State Treasurer election
Party	Candidate	Votes	%	±%
Republican	Curtis Loftis (incumbent)	1,062,666	52.52%	
Democratic	Vincent Coe	959,539	47.42%	
Write-in		1,107	0.05%	
Total votes		2,023,312	100.0	

== See also ==
- 2026 United States state treasurer elections
- 2026 South Carolina elections
