= SC for Ed =

Political advocacy group

- Formation: 2018
- Founder: Lisa Ellis
- Founded at: Columbia, South Carolina
- Dissolved: 2023
- Type: Non-profit
- Location: South Carolina
- Website: scfored.org

SC for Ed, founded in 2018 by Lisa Ellis, is a 501(c)(4) nonprofit political advocacy group in South Carolina, United States.

== Overview ==
Lisa Ellis, founder of the organization, ran for the office of state superintendent of education in the 2022 election, as a fusion candidate on the Democratic and Alliance Party tickets. Ellis won the Democratic nomination in the June primary and announced she would take a leave of absence from the group to focus on her campaign. Since 2019, the group has gained notoriety and political strength in South Carolina, garnering the support of a number of state legislators, mostly Democratic {{Citation needed}}. However, Republicans have compromised with SC for Ed's leaders on issues including teacher pay raises. As a 501(c)(4), the group has considered taking steps such as running targeted advertisements.

== History ==
=== All Out Teacher Rally ===
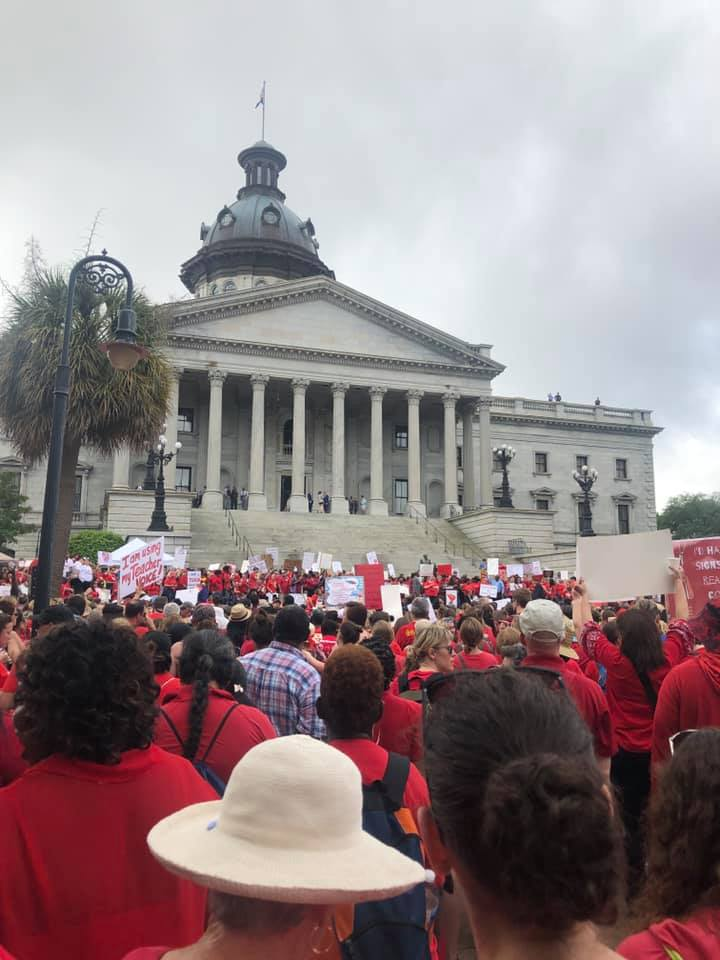
Teacher protest at South Carolina statehouse, estimated 10,000 people

On May 1, 2019, over 10,000 educators met at the South Carolina Statehouse to protest various issues related to education, including low teacher pay, high student-to-teacher ratio, and the teacher shortage. Many school districts around the state closed during the protest, with some citing a high number of leave requests, such as personal days, and low numbers of substitutes as reasons for the closures. Some school districts, such as Richland School District 2 later voted to forgive the day missed due to the event.

Organizers of the protest hailed it as a success. The state legislature soon voted to increase teacher pay by 4%, though no legislation directly altered the state of high classroom occupancy and the teacher shortage.

=== COVID-19 ===
Throughout the COVID-19 pandemic in 2020 and 2021, SC for Ed frequently advocated for the institution of mask mandates in schools, which governor Henry McMaster refused to initiate. Further, the group demanded that schools remain closed more than a year after the outset of the pandemic, at a time during which there was some controversy over the effects of early strains of the virus on children. For example, according to Anthony Fauci, in November 2021, "The spread among children and from children is not really very big at all." Fauci later amended his statement, saying, in reference to Florida's anti-mask mandate law, "I cannot understand how one can say I'm going to mandate that you don't allow a person to mandate a mask – in other words the anti-mandate mandate. It just doesn't make any sense to me why you would want to not protect the children." An SC for Ed board member stated, "If we do not have mitigation efforts that are effective in place to help with the spread of COVID, such as masks, we are going to see more and more children become ill,” The group based its position on then-current medical guidance from the American Academy of Pediatrics and Centers for Disease Control and Prevention.

== Criticism and Reactions ==
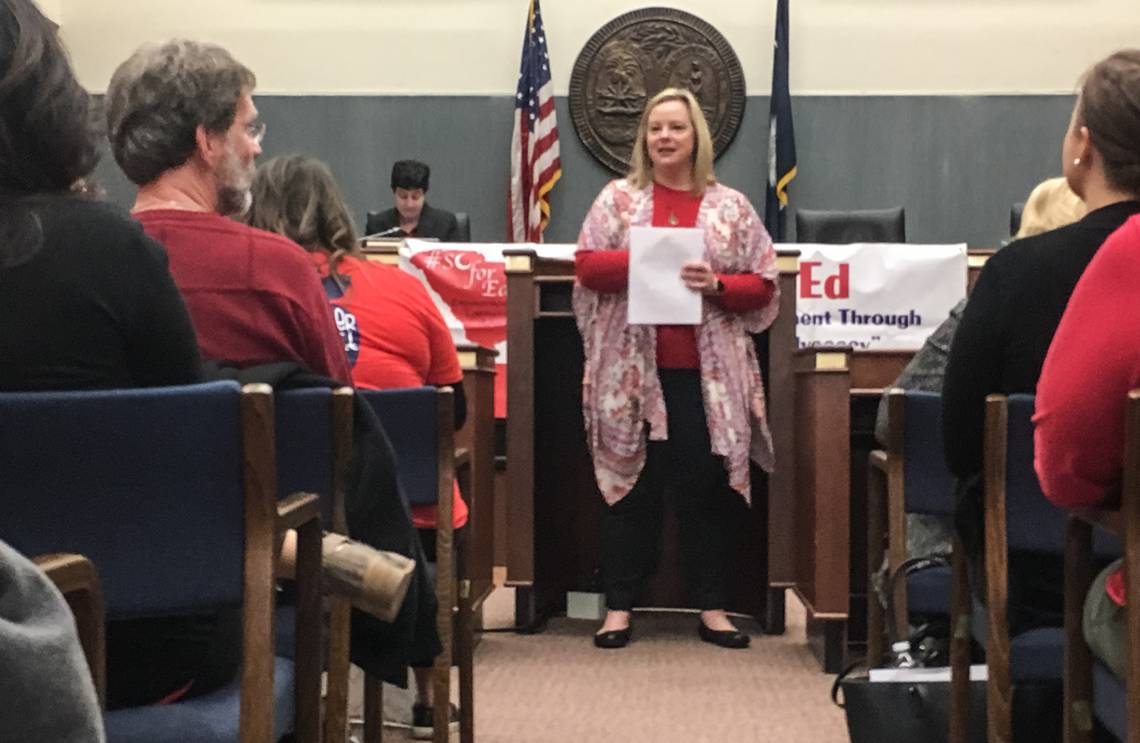
Lisa Ellis speaking at the South Carolina Statehouse.

The group has gained criticism for encouraging teachers to take accrued personal leave days to protest. Although the group itself is politically nonpartisan, online media outlet FITSNews, which has a history of anti-labor positions, has labeled the group as "liberal" or "mob" or "union." Local news outlets such as The State (newspaper) and WIS (TV) have cited data and opinions from the group in explaining issues like the state teacher shortage.

In May 2021, the group stated that they were forced to meet in secret because of death threats made online, including one from an organization that stormed the U.S. Capitol on January 6, 2021. Law enforcement informed the group of some of the threats. SC for ED filed police reports against the people and groups that threatened violence. The group had planned to march at the South Carolina Statehouse and the governor's mansion, but decided to cancel "for the safety of all involved." SC for Ed has opposed legislation by state legislators prohibiting the implementation of what some legislators have called Critical race theory, and has opposed the banning of books related to race-related concepts, including information on its website about the legislation from the NAACP Legal Defense and Educational Fund and others. Others have agreed with SC for Ed that the laws "might further drive teachers out of the classroom and lead to an incomplete education of topics, such as the American Civil War and the Civil Rights Movement." The NAACP Legal Defense and Educational Fund included the South Carolina "anti-CRT" bills among a list of "Bans on Truth, History and Racial Discourse" and the South Carolina chapters of the NAACP, American Civil Liberties Union, E3 Foundation, and Lowcountry Black Parents Association all partnered with SC for Ed in opposing the bills, as well.

In the 2022 debate for South Carolina state superintendent of education, Ellen Weaver accused the group for pushing progressive legislation and "pronoun politics," and also said that she believes that the group believes parents are "domestic terrorists." Ellis, on the other hand, "mostly avoided partisan talking points," according to The State. Weaver defeated Ellis in the general election. In her concession statement, Ellis said, "We will continue to stay persistent and continue to fight for every student to have a high-quality education in our state," she said in the statement. "We have mobilized voters across our state who previously did not feel their voice mattered; we have given teachers and families a choice in who represents them and empowered them to use their voice." She continues to work as a full-time teacher and student activities director.

== Current status ==
In June 2023, five years after its founding, SC for Ed said that the organization will "indefinitely pause" some aspects of its advocacy work. The group still maintains active social media pages, and has released press releases and statements since that announcement. Local news media continues to cite the group on issues of public interest related to education.

== See also ==
- Palmetto State Teachers Association
- South Carolina Education Association
