= Nancy Mace =

American politician (born 1977)

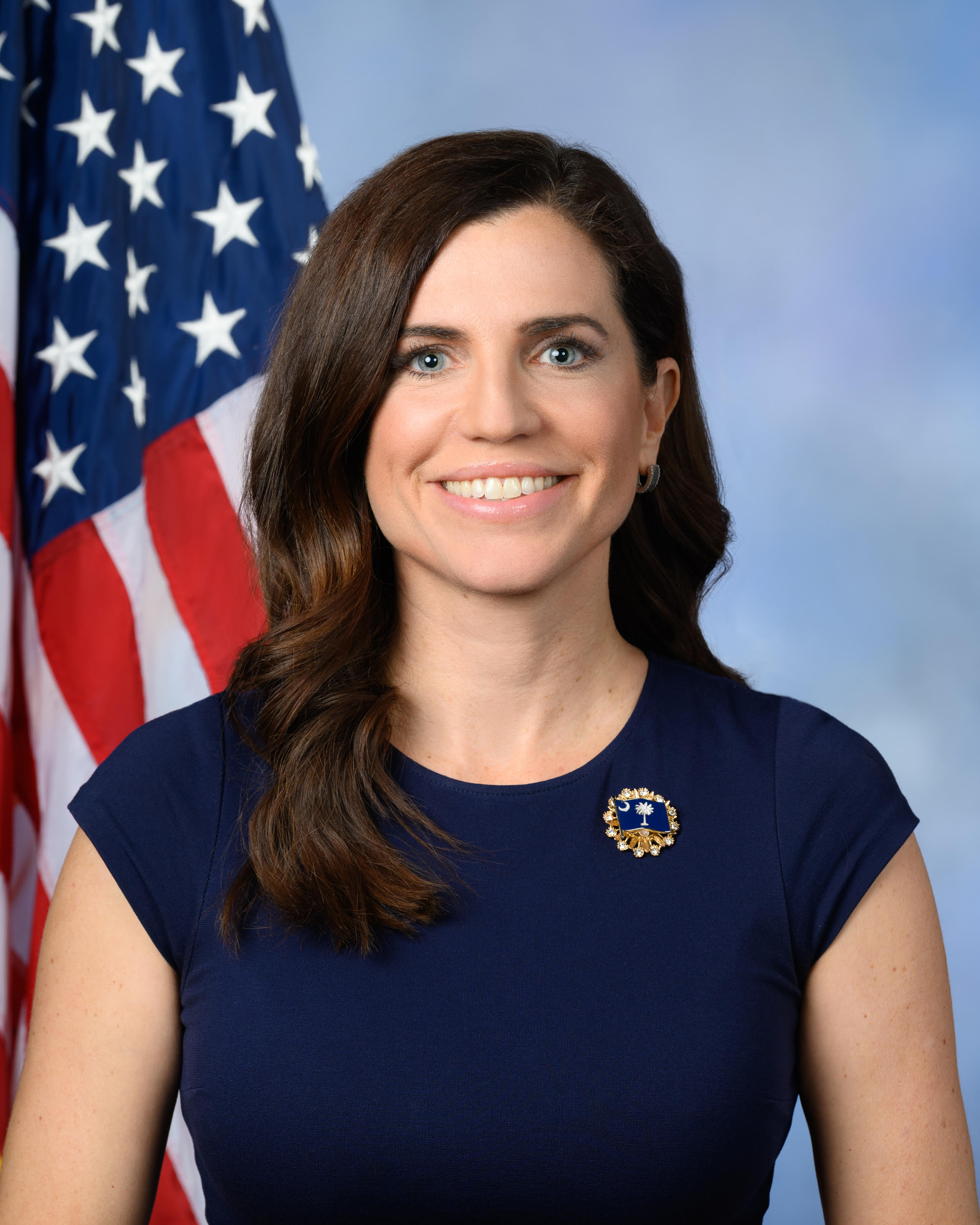
- Official portrait, 2020

Member of the U.S. House of Representatives from South Carolina's 1st district
- Incumbent
- Assumed office January 3, 2021
- Preceded by: Joe Cunningham

Member of the South Carolina House of Representatives from the 99th district
- In office January 23, 2018 – November 8, 2020
- Preceded by: James Merrill
- Succeeded by: Mark Smith

Personal details
- Born: Nancy Ruth Mace; December 4, 1977 (age 48) Fayetteville, North Carolina, U.S.
- Party: Republican
- Spouse(s): Chris Niemiec (m. 1999; div. 2002) Curtis Jackson (m. 2004; div. 2019)
- Children: 2
- Education: The Citadel (BA); University of Georgia (MA)
- Website: House website Campaign website

Nancy Ruth Mace (born December 4, 1977) is an American politician who is the U.S. representative for South Carolina's 1st congressional district since 2021. A member of the Republican Party, she previously was in the South Carolina General Assembly from 2018 to 2020.

In 1999, Mace became the first woman to graduate from the Corps of Cadets program at the Citadel Military College of South Carolina, which was led at the time by her father, Emory Mace, the commandant of cadets. From 2018 to 2020, she represented the 99th district in the South Carolina House of Representatives, covering Hanahan, northeast Mount Pleasant, and Daniel Island.

Mace was elected to Congress in 2020, defeating incumbent Democrat Joe Cunningham. She was re-elected in 2022 and 2024. She is the first Republican woman elected to Congress from South Carolina. She was a candidate for governor of South Carolina in 2026, but was eliminated in the primary election.

== Early life and education ==
Mace was born on December 4, 1977, in Fayetteville, North Carolina, to United States Army brigadier general James Emory Mace and schoolteacher Anne Mace. Her father was commandant of cadets at The Citadel from 1997 to 2005.

In 1999, she became the first woman to graduate from the Citadel's Corps of Cadets program, earning a degree in business administration magna cum laude. She wrote the book In the Company of Men: A Woman at The Citadel (2001) about the experience.

In 2004, she earned a master's degree in journalism and mass communication from the Henry W. Grady College of Journalism and Mass Communication at the University of Georgia.

== Early career ==
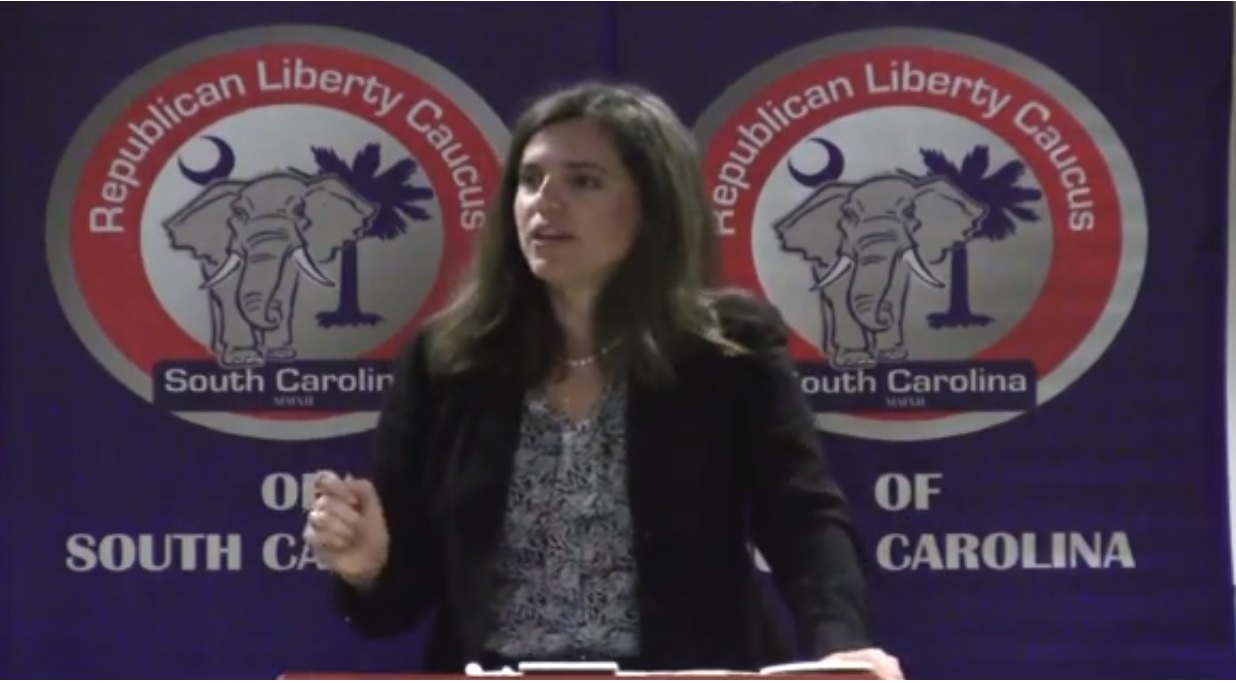
Mace during her campaign for the U.S. Senate for South Carolina in 2013

In 2008, Mace founded the Mace Group, a public relations and consulting firm.

She became co-owner of the website FITSNews, which she had begun working for in 2007, and then sold her stake in 2013. The site covers South Carolina politics and current events.

In 2012, Mace volunteered for the campaign of presidential candidate Ron Paul.

In August 2013, she announced her candidacy in the 2014 election for the Republican nomination for U.S. Senate in South Carolina. She received 19,560 votes (6.2% of the vote) in the primary election on June 10, 2014, behind Lindsey Graham (56.4%), Lee Bright (15.4%), Richard Cash (8.3%), and Det Bowers (7.3%).

She supported Donald Trump for president in 2016 as a coalitions director and field director for the campaign.

== South Carolina House of Representatives ==
=== State House elections ===
==== 2017 special ====
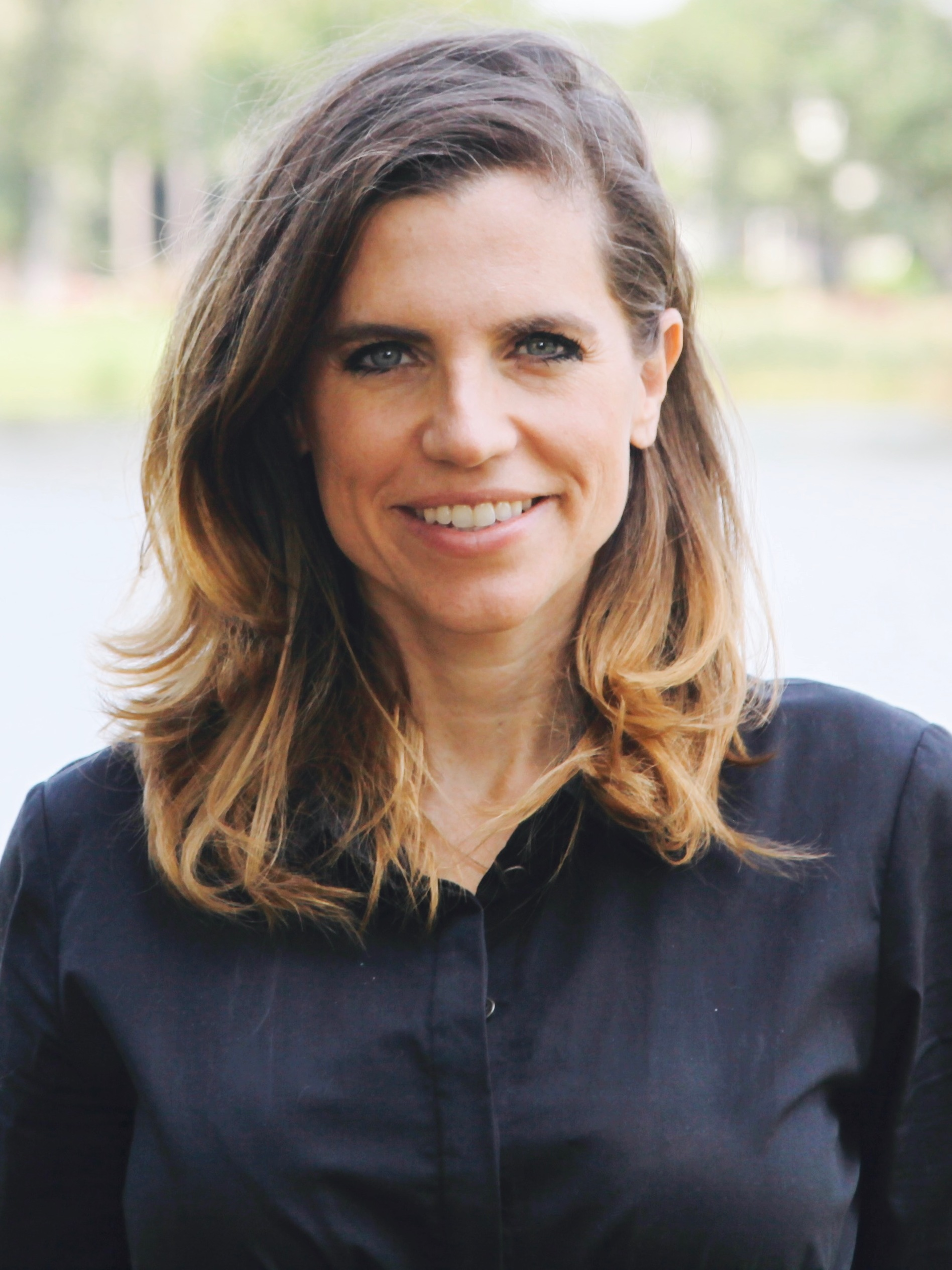
Mace in 2017

On September 18, 2017, Mace filed as a Republican to run in a special election for the South Carolina State House District 99 seat being vacated by Jimmy Merrill, who resigned earlier that month after an indictment and plea deal for several ethics violations. She received 49.4% of the vote in the November 14 Republican primary, 13 votes short of winning the nomination outright. She defeated the second-place finisher, Mount Pleasant town councilman Mark Smith, in the November 28 runoff, 63–37%.

Mace defeated Democrat Cindy Boatwright in the January 16, 2018, general election, with 2,071 votes to 1,587 (57–43%). She took office on January 23, 2018.

==== 2018 ====
Mace defeated the Democratic nominee, Mount Pleasant resident Jen Gibson, in the November 6, 2018, general election.

=== State House tenure ===
In 2019, Mace successfully advocated for the inclusion of exceptions for rape and incest in a bill for a six-week abortion ban that passed the South Carolina state house. In a speech on the state house floor, Mace revealed that she had been raped at age 16. She has said she opposes abortion but does not believe the government has the right to deny the procedure to a victim of rape or incest.

Mace co-sponsored a bill to oppose offshore drilling off South Carolina's coast. She opposed President Donald Trump's plan to offer oil drilling leases off South Carolina beaches.

The Conservation Voters of South Carolina gave Mace a 100% Lifetime rating for her voting record against offshore drilling and seismic testing. The South Carolina Club for Growth gave Mace its 2019 Tax Payer Hero Award.

In May 2020, Governor Henry McMaster signed into law Mace's prison reform bill, which ends the shackling of pregnant women in prison.

== U.S. House of Representatives ==
=== House elections ===
==== 2020 ====
In June 2019, Mace announced that she would seek the Republican nomination for South Carolina's 1st congressional district, centered in Charleston, and at the time represented by Democrat Joe Cunningham. Cunningham won the seat in 2018 in a surprise victory, winning a district Trump had carried by 13 percentage points two years earlier. Mace faced Mount Pleasant city councilwoman Kathy Landing and Bikers for Trump founder Chris Cox in the June 9 Republican primary. During her primary campaign, she ran an advertisement stating she would "help President Trump take care of our veterans", and in which Vice President Mike Pence called her "an extraordinary American with an extraordinary lifetime of accomplishments—past, present and future." She won the primary with 57.5% of the vote.

Mace focused her campaign on banning offshore drilling off South Carolina's coast and restoring South Carolina's low country's economy.

Mace claimed Joe Cunningham was seeking trans equality in the Marine Corps which she claimed would shut down Marine Corps Recruit Depot Parris Island.

In the November general election, Mace defeated Cunningham. She assumed office on January 3, 2021.

==== 2022 ====
Mace did not vote to impeach President Trump, but she criticized him for his role in the January 6, 2021, attack on the U.S. Capitol. As a consequence, Trump endorsed former South Carolina representative Katie Arrington in the 2022 Republican primary for Mace's congressional seat. Mace defeated Arrington.

In the November general election, Mace defeated Democratic nominee and future U.S. Senator Annie Andrews by 14 percentage points.

==== 2024 ====
Mace ran for a third term and defeated Democratic candidate Michael B. Moore in the general election.

=== House tenure ===
==== Relationship to Donald Trump ====
Mace was one of seven Republicans who publicly refused to support their colleagues' efforts to challenge the results of the 2020 presidential election on January 6, 2021. These seven signed a letter that, while giving credence to Trump's allegations of electoral fraud, said Congress did not have the authority to influence the election's outcome. Mace was so concerned by the hostile atmosphere Trump was generating in the District of Columbia that she sent her children home to South Carolina before the congressional vote to accept the Electoral College votes.

After the 2021 United States Capitol attack, Mace pleaded with Trump to condemn it. While locked down in her Capitol office she told CBS News' Red & Blue host Elaine Quijano, "I'm begging the president to get off Twitter." Ultimately Mace voted against impeaching Trump, however, stating that due process had not been properly followed. She would later come to Trump's defense after he was indicted for mishandling classified documents.

In 2024, Mace endorsed Trump in the 2024 Republican primaries over Nikki Haley, who supported Mace in the 2022 primary.

==== Relationship to other lawmakers ====
In November 2021, Mace criticized fellow Republican congresswoman Lauren Boebert for her anti-Muslim comments about Democrat Ilhan Omar.

On October 3, 2023, Mace voted in favor of removing Kevin McCarthy, a fellow Republican, from his position as speaker of the House. According to Mace, "McCarthy did not follow through on pushing her legislation to address the country's rape-kit backlog, expand access to birth control, adopt a balanced budget amendment and create an alert system that would notify people when there is a mass shooting". McCarthy, who had been a strong ally of Mace's, denied her claims. Following his ouster, Mace took to media, describing him as "a loser" who was "bored and doesn't know what to do with himself." Mace stated that she had never liked McCarthy since she joined Congress, baffling district Republicans who questioned why she had turned on her ally. Berkeley County Republican Party chair Victoria Cowart said "one of the sentiments I get the most is that she's talking out of both sides of her mouth."

On October 30, 2025, Mace was involved in an incident with law enforcement at Charleston International Airport in South Carolina, after the Charleston County Aviation Authority were late to meet her to escort her to her flight. She commented "Fucking incompetent" repeatedly and "this is no way to treat a fucking U.S. Representative". Mace's team claimed this was due to a concern for lax security and the representative's safety. Mace continued to accuse the airport security of "lies" after the incident. During the outburst, Mace commented that they "would never treat Tim Scott like this", which prompted senator Tim Scott and senator Lindsey Graham to publicly denounce Mace for her behavior. Mace claimed in an interview with CNN's Kaitlan Collins that the police report about the incident was "falsified", though an internal investigation had confirmed the testimony of the officers involved.

==== Legislation ====
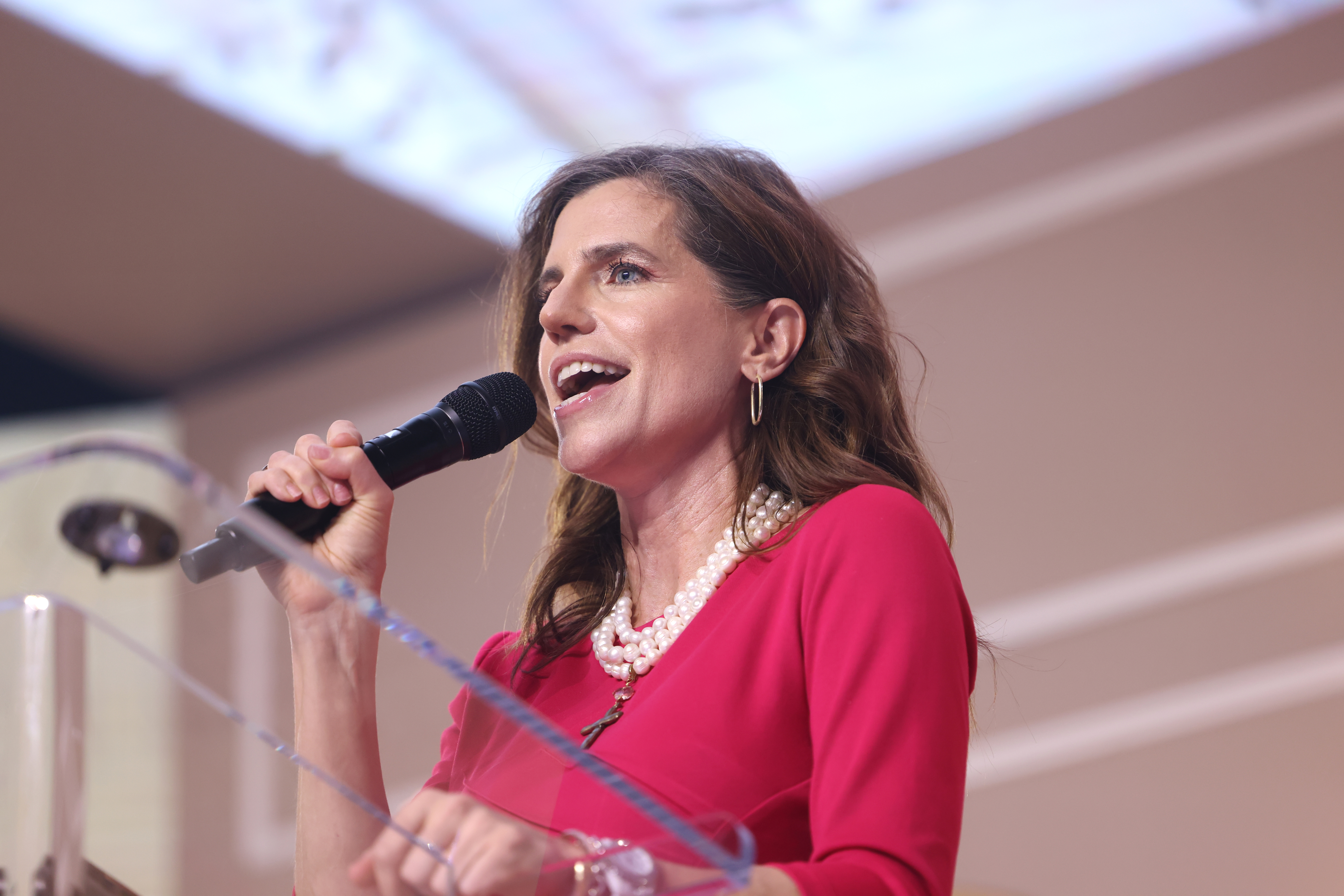
U.S. Congresswoman Nancy Mace speaking with attendees at the 2025 Young Women's Leadership Summit

On May 18, 2021, Mace joined 61 other House Republicans to vote against the COVID-19 Hate Crimes Act, which condemned acts of hate against Asian Americans and streamlined data collection and reporting about such occurrences. The bill previously passed the U.S. Senate on a 94–1 vote. Mace said she opposed the bill because it did not address discrimination against Asian-Americans in higher education.

On October 2, 2023, the House of Representatives passed a cybersecurity bill titled the Modernizing the Acquisition of Cybersecurity Experts Act (the MACE Act), intended to modernize federal cybersecurity job requirements. The bill was introduced by Mace and would be the last bill passed under Speaker Kevin McCarthy. Mace's legislative staff named the bill after her as a joke about Mace's ego.

In April 2024, Mace introduced the Preventing Animal Abuse and Waste Act (i.e. the PAAW Act). The bill "prevents the National Institute of Health (NIH) from conducting or supporting any research that causes significant pain and distress to dogs and cats." It also "requires reports to Congress by the NIH and Government Accountability Office detailing NIH-funded dog and cat experiments, their cost and assessments of NIH efforts to phase them out."

In 2025, Mace was among a handful of Republican lawmakers to sign a petition calling for a vote on the release of the Epstein files. Mace, a survivor of rape and sexual abuse, wrote on social media that "the Epstein petition is deeply personal."

==== Former staff and focus on media attention ====
Many former congressional staffers for Mace have described her approach to her office as focused on gaining media attention. Her staffers have attributed many of her political actions, such as her vote against McCarthy, to a desire to make headlines and appear on TV programs. Staffers recalled her attempting to attract attention to herself during the January 6 Capitol attack by risking her own safety and seeking to be assaulted by rioters. Mace's former communications director described a resolution introduced by Mace to limit usage of House of Representatives bathrooms to those designated for one's biological sex, in response to the election of a transgender member, as a ploy for media attention. Legislative staffers for Mace described her efforts to attract media attention as hampering her legislative agenda and working relationships with other members of Congress.

An internal staff handbook written by Mace showcased a strong focus on public image and media attention, with strenuous expectations for communications staff. Mace's handbook required communications staffers to book her on national TV outlets at least 1–3 times a day, and on local TV channels at least 6 times per week. The handbook was more detailed in its descriptions of communications staff compared to legislative and constituent-focused staff positions. Mace's office experienced high levels of turnover, including a complete turnover of all staff between November 2023 and February 2024. Her office turnover was among the highest in Congress between 2021 and 2024.

In May 2025, former staffers told Wired magazine that Mace would get them to set up burner social media accounts in order to monitor and bolster her public image. In February 2026, former staffers told New York magazine that she ordered a staffer to boost her in rankings of "hottest women in Congress" on Reddit. According to one former aide, "We were scared of her. She would make staffers cry. She would threaten to fire them, take their money away, not give them raises, not to give them days off, religious days."

==== Foster care advocacy event incident ====
In December 2024, Mace said that a foster youth activist and children's advocate threatened and physically assaulted her during a handshake at an event celebrating the Foster Care Independence Act. The advocate was arrested by U.S. Capitol Police on charges of assaulting a government official and jailed overnight. In court documents, Mace stated that the individual "began to aggressively and in an exaggerated manner shake her arm up and down in a hand shaking motion," while stating that "Trans youth deserve advocacy," leaving her feeling intimidated and injured. At least three witnesses disputed Mace's description of the handshake, saying they saw nothing but a "routine handshake". Another witness stated that the individual "took her hand with both of his hands and shook her arm up and down in an exaggerated, aggressive handshaking motion". Mace refused paramedics' assistance, but stated in court documents that she felt "pain in her wrists, arm and armpit/shoulder due to the incident". On April 1, 2025, the United States attorney for the District of Columbia announced he would drop the misdemeanor charge against the individual. Shortly after, Mace withdrew from the Congressional Caucus on Foster Youth. Mace was replaced as co-chair by Rep. Erin Houchin.

=== Redistricting ===
South Carolina redrew its congressional map after the 2020 census showed significant population changes between districts. The NAACP challenged the map and a panel of three federal judges ruled in 2023 that Mace's congressional District 1 was redrawn in a "stark racial gerrymander" intended to suppress the power of Black voters. The redistricting moved 62% of Black Charleston County voters (a total of 30,000) from Mace's District 1 to District 6 — represented by Jim Clyburn, a Black Democrat who has held the seat for 30 years — and moved inland white voters into Mace's District 1.

The state appealed and, after hearing oral arguments in October 2023, the Supreme Court reversed the lower court's ruling in a 6–3 decision in May 2024, finding that the legislature's redistricting decisions were driven by partisan goals, specifically to increase District 1's Republican vote share, rather than by race. The Court emphasized that while race and partisan preference are highly correlated in South Carolina, the use of political data for partisan aims is not constitutionally prohibited even if it results in racial disparities. The Court also noted that the plaintiff's decision not to provide an alternative map was an "implicit concession" that it could not draw one that would prove racial discrimination while achieving the same partisan outcome. The dissenting justices argued that the majority's approach would make it significantly harder to challenge racial gerrymandering in the future. In response to the ruling, Mace stated, "It reaffirms everything everyone in South Carolina already knows, which is that the line wasn't based on race."

=== Congressional oversight ===
==== Unidentified anomalous phenomena (UAP) ====
As chairwoman of the House Subcommittee on Cybersecurity, Information Technology, and Government Innovation, Mace has led congressional hearings on UAPs (also known as UFOs) and government transparency. In a July 2023 hearing, Mace questioned David Grusch, a former senior intelligence official and lead UAP analyst for the National Geospatial-Intelligence Agency, about claims of recovered extraterrestrial spacecraft and biological remains.

In a November 2024 hearing, Mace criticized the Pentagon's All-domain Anomaly Resolution Office (AARO) for being "unable, or perhaps unwilling, to bring forward the truth about the government's activities concerning UAPs" and questioned why the government maintains such secrecy if there is "no big deal and there's nothing there."

=== Committee assignments ===
- Committee on Armed Services
- Committee on Oversight and Accountability
- Committee on Veterans' Affairs

=== Caucus memberships ===
- Congressional Blockchain Caucus
- Climate Solutions Caucus
- Congressional Caucus on Turkey and Turkish Americans
- Congressional Wildlife Refuge Caucus
- Problem Solvers Caucus
- Rare Disease Caucus
- Unidentified Anomalous Phenomena Caucus

== 2026 South Carolina gubernatorial campaign ==
On August 4, 2025, Mace officially announced her bid for Governor of South Carolina in the 2026 election. She lost in the primary election and in choosing to run for governor, she vacated her seat in the 2026 United States House of Representatives elections. Without having won any county in the state, and being left on fifth place in her home county of Charleston, she stated that she will go "back to the private sector" after the end of her third term in Congress. She endorsed Alan Wilson against Pamela Evette in the subsequent runoff.

Mace became the third among the four Republican representatives who helped force the House to vote on the release of the Epstein files who will no longer hold an elected office after 2026. Mace pointed towards this vote as the primary reason Trump declined to endorse her gubernatorial campaign, endorsing her opponent Pamela Evette instead.

== Political positions ==
=== Abortion and contraception ===
Mace has supported efforts to limit access to abortion. In 2021, she cosponsored the Life at Conception Act, which would recognize a fertilized egg as a person with equal protections under the 14th Amendment and establish a nationwide abortion ban. Describing herself as "staunchly pro-life", she has also criticized abortion bans enacted in some states and called for Republicans to be more moderate on the issue, and said she would only support legislation that "has exceptions of rape or incest and the life of the mother". Expounding on her views, she stated: "The vast majority of people want some sort of gestational limits, ... not at nine months, but somewhere in the middle. They want exceptions for rape and incest. They want women to have access to birth control. These are all very common-sense positions that we can take and still be pro-life." Mace has voiced support for gestational limits of 15 to 20 weeks.

In 2021, Mace was among a handful of Republican representatives who did not sign onto an amicus brief to overturn Roe v. Wade. She criticized states enacting abortion bans without exceptions in the wake of the Supreme Court overturning Roe v. Wade in 2022. In an interview on Face the Nation, she said she disagreed with the recently passed abortion ban in Florida, which was signed into law by Governor Ron DeSantis: "Signing a six-week ban that puts women who are victims of rape and girls who are victims of incest and in a hard spot isn't the way to change hearts and minds. It's not compassionate. The requirements [DeSantis] has for rape victims are too much, not something that I support. It's a non-starter. I am a victim of rape. I was raped by a classmate at the age of 16. I am very wary, and the devil is always in the details, but we've got to show more care and concern and compassion for women who've been raped. I don't like that this bill was signed in the dead of night".

In June 2021, Mace was one of 26 Republicans to vote for the Equal Access to Contraception for Veterans Act. In January 2023, Mace introduced the Standing with Moms Act, which would create a website, life.gov, that would link women to crisis pregnancy centers (non-profits established by anti-abortion groups primarily to persuade pregnant women not to have an abortion).

=== Agriculture ===
In March 2022, Mace and Representative Veronica Escobar introduced legislation to prohibit the confinement of pregnant pigs in gestation crates. In October 2023, Mace led a letter to the House Agriculture Committee by 16 House Republicans opposing the inclusion of language in the 2023 farm bill that would have overturned state farm animal welfare laws banning gestation crates and battery cages, including California's Proposition 12. The letter argued that the legislation would infringe on states' rights and disproportionately benefit foreign-owned agribusinesses like the Chinese-owned pork producer WH Group.

In recognition of her opposition to federal preemption of state agricultural laws and support for reforms to federal commodity checkoff programs, Mace received a leadership award from the Organization for Competitive Markets and Competitive Markets Action in February 2024. However, such checkoff program reforms have been a subject of disagreement among beef producers. In March 2024, Mace joined another House Republican letter opposing preemption of state agricultural laws, citing concerns about national security and foreign influence over the U.S. agricultural sector.

=== Animal welfare ===
Mace has been critical of scientific experimentation on animals, which she describes as "taxpayer funded animal cruelty". In April 2024, she introduced legislation to prohibit federal funding for experiments on dogs and cats. In May 2024, in response to South Dakota Governor Kristi Noem admitting to shooting her pet dog, Mace co-founded the Congressional Dog Lovers Caucus alongside Representatives Jared Moskowitz and Susan Wild. In May 2025, Mace authored legislation to require that animals used in federal research laboratories be relocated or put up for adoption rather than killed.

In May 2021, Mace and Representative Rosa DeLauro introduced legislation to ban the farming of mink for fur, citing evidence that mink farming promotes the spread of zoonotic disease. Mace described the practice of mink farming as "inhumane". The legislation was passed by the House of Representatives as an amendment to the America COMPETES Act of 2022 but was not included in the Senate version of the bill and did not become law.

In 2024, Mace was the lead author of the "Snowmobiles Aren't Weapons Act" which would prohibit running over and killing wildlife in some federal land. According to a statement released by the representatives' office, "Our federal lands are not battlegrounds for reckless and belligerent behavior. This bill will preserve the safety and beauty of our natural spaces and ensure wildlife can thrive without the threat of harm from motor vehicles."

In 2025, Mace was one of 14 representatives who signed a Republican letter against the "Save Our Bacon Act". In the letter, it was stated that legislation like the "Save Our Bacon Act" would "erode states' rights, undermine family farmers, and expand foreign influence over U.S. food production."

=== Washington, D.C., statehood ===
In April 2021, Mace voiced her opposition to a Democratic proposal to grant the District of Columbia statehood. She argued that Washington, D.C., was too small to qualify as a state, saying, "D.C. wouldn't even qualify as a singular congressional district."

=== Debt ceiling ===
On May 31, 2023, Mace was among 71 House Republicans who voted against the final passage of the Fiscal Responsibility Act of 2023 to raise the debt ceiling. Mace was one of three Republican members of the Problem Solvers Caucus who voted against raising the debt ceiling that day. Two days later she appeared on Steve Bannon's podcast to claim, "the American people were spoon-fed a bed of lies" regarding the measure.

=== Extraterrestrial life ===
Mace has stated she believes space aliens have "been interacting with humanity".

In an interview with OutKick, Mace cited the cases of Bob Lazar and David Grusch to conclude that explanations of UFO sightings that did not involve space aliens "didn't add up".

During the 2024 United States drone sightings Mace said she would not rule out the purported drones were from "outer space" or "outside the universe". A joint investigation by civilian and military agencies of the U.S. government failed to find "anything anomalous" and said that sightings included mistaken aircraft and other objects. State and local law enforcement as well as numerous independent experts reported similar conclusions.

=== Foreign policy ===
During the prelude to the Russian invasion of Ukraine, Mace wrote an article opposing military intervention in the conflict.

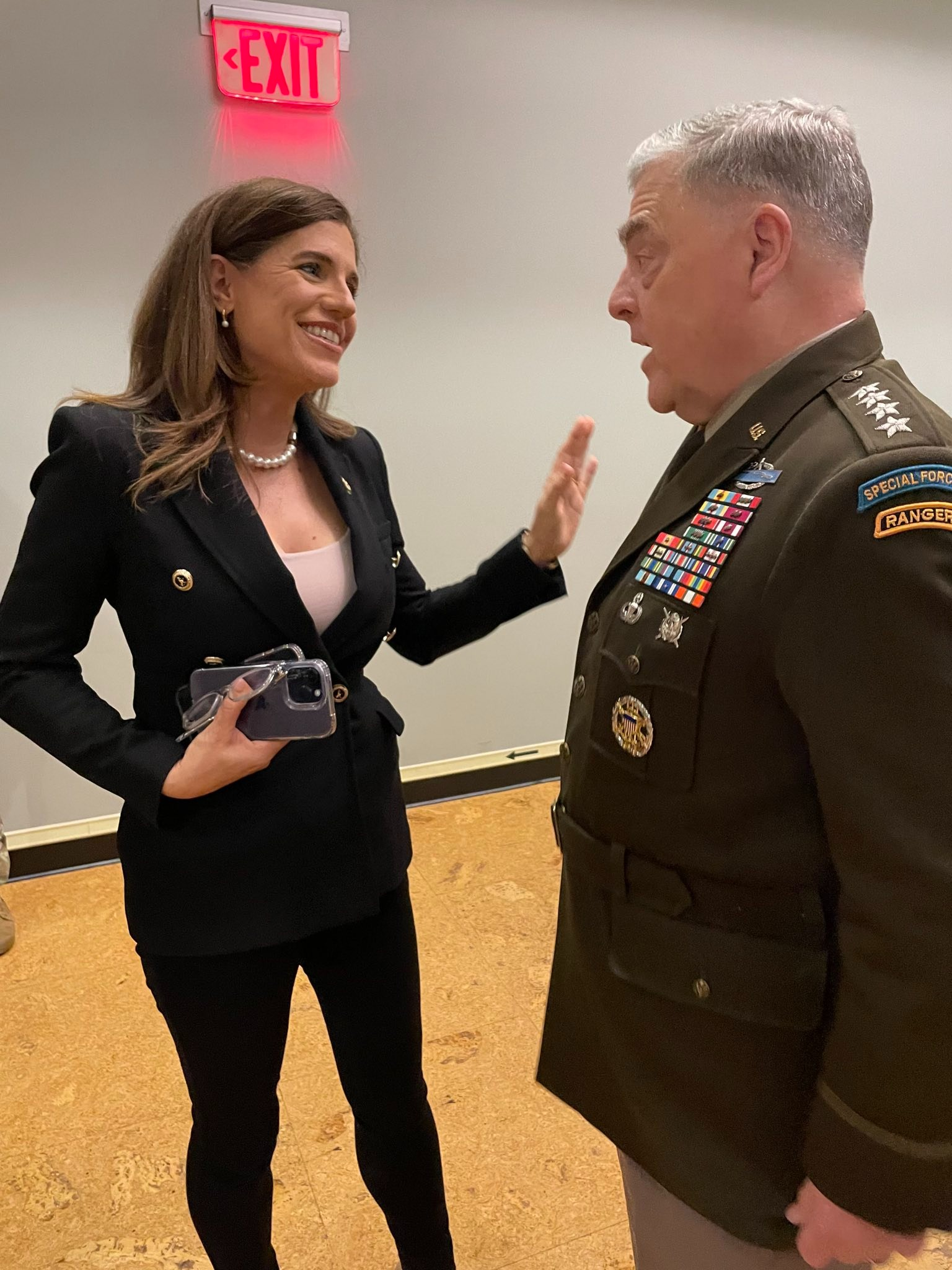
Mace speaks with Mark Milley in 2023.

In 2025, Mace supported President Trump's proposal to send U.S. troops to take control of the Gaza Strip.

=== Healthcare ===
During her 2014 U.S. Senate campaign, Mace said "We must use any means possible to repeal, defund, and ultimately stop Obamacare" because it will "suffocate individual liberty and further stifle economic growth".

=== Islam ===
In June 2026, Mace tweeted in support of Dasha Kilpatrick, a Texas woman who verbally abused two Muslim women in a supermarket and told them to leave the U.S. because it is "not their country." Mace stated on August 9, 2026 that she was a "total Islamaphobe [sic]", in response to a tweet from Representative Pramilla Jayapal criticizing Mace's belief that Muslims holding political office in the United States are all a "trojan horse".

In a September 2026 appearance on Piers Morgan Uncensored, Mace said in reference to Muslims, "I've seen what they've done in foreign countries when a woman shows her hair being stoned to death, being put to death. That's not the kind of ideology that I want to see here grow in the United States." She also asserted that British-American journalist Mehdi Hasan is "jihad adjacent".

=== LGBTQ rights ===
HuffPost wrote that Mace, while initially supportive of LGBTQ rights when first elected to the House, took on significantly more right-wing positions.

==== Gay rights ====
In 2021, the Washington Examiner wrote that Mace "is a supporter of both religious liberty and gay marriage." Later that year, she told the Examiner, "I strongly support LGBTQ rights and equality. No one should be discriminated against." She opposed the Equality Act, instead co-sponsoring a Republican alternative called the Fairness for All Act. Mace was one of 31 Republicans to vote for the LGBTQ Business Equal Credit Enforcement and Investment Act in 2021, and sponsored H.R.5776 – Serving Our LGBTQ Veterans Act, legislation establishing a Center for Lesbian, Gay, Bisexual, Transgender, and Queer (LGBTQ) Veterans within the Department of Veterans Affairs, also in 2021.

In July 2022, Mace was among 47 Republican representatives who voted in favor of the Respect for Marriage Act, which protects existing same-sex and interracial marriages under federal law. She later said, "If gay couples want to be as happily or miserably married as straight couples, more power to them. Trust me, I've tried it more than once."

Starting in 2025, Mace began making more statements critical of gays and lesbians in public life, calling for books with LGBTQ themes to be banned from schools and libraries. Mace frequently accuses gay and lesbian couples of grooming children, and has repeatedly referred to the Charleston County Public Library as a "grooming center".

In March 2025, Mace criticized U.S. Senator Elissa Slotkin for reading aloud from a children's book about LGBT tolerance, saying "The Left gets mad when we call them groomers but then continue to do this."

==== Transgender rights ====
On November 18, 2024, Mace introduced a resolution to prohibit "Members, officers, and employees of the House of Representatives" from using single-sex facilities (like restrooms, locker rooms, and changing rooms) in the Capitol or House Office Buildings that do not correspond to their biological sex. She specified in her press release that the bill was intended for transgender women, and said in an interview that newly elected Delaware representative Sarah McBride, the first openly transgender member of the United States Congress, was "absolutely" the target of her bathroom resolution. Mace described McBride as a "biological man trying to force himself into women's spaces" and as a "guy in a skirt", later following this up by saying "It's offensive that a man in a skirt thinks that he is my equal".

On November 20, Mace introduced the Protecting Women's Private Spaces Act, which goes beyond her prior resolution to prohibit anyone from accessing or using single-sex facilities on any federal property unless that facility corresponds to the person's "biological sex", except for emergency medical personnel during an emergency or law enforcement officers during active pursuit or investigation. As some trans activists were protesting her bill, Mace referred to them using the anti-transgender slur "tranny", resulting in her posts on some social media being flagged for hateful content.

At a House Oversight Committee hearing on February 5, 2025, Mace again used "tranny" to refer to trans people; when confronted, she repeated the word three times saying, "I don't really care." She used the same slur during a confrontation with a transgender student at University of South Carolina, as well as within the first few seconds of a hearing for an amendment that would prevent funding trans-related care for members of military families.

At a DOGE subcommittee hearing in May 2025, Mace accused Fatima Goss Graves, CEO of the National Women's Law Center, of sexual grooming, saying "I didn't come here to play with an ideology hell-bent on erasing women and grooming children. That's what you all are, you're groomers."

On September 12, 2025, in the aftermath of the assassination of Charlie Kirk, Mace said without basis that "it sounds like the shooter was a tranny or pro-tranny" before a suspect had been arrested. On September 16, Mace said in a street interview that suspect Tyler Robinson had been "radicalized" by the transgender community to kill Kirk. She also said that transgender people were "mentally ill and should be in a straight jacket with a hard steel lock on it", and used "tranny" several more times.

On May 22, 2026, Mace made a post from her X account, writing the word "tranny" three times followed by "We're still not afraid to say it." The post was later deleted.

=== Marijuana legalization ===
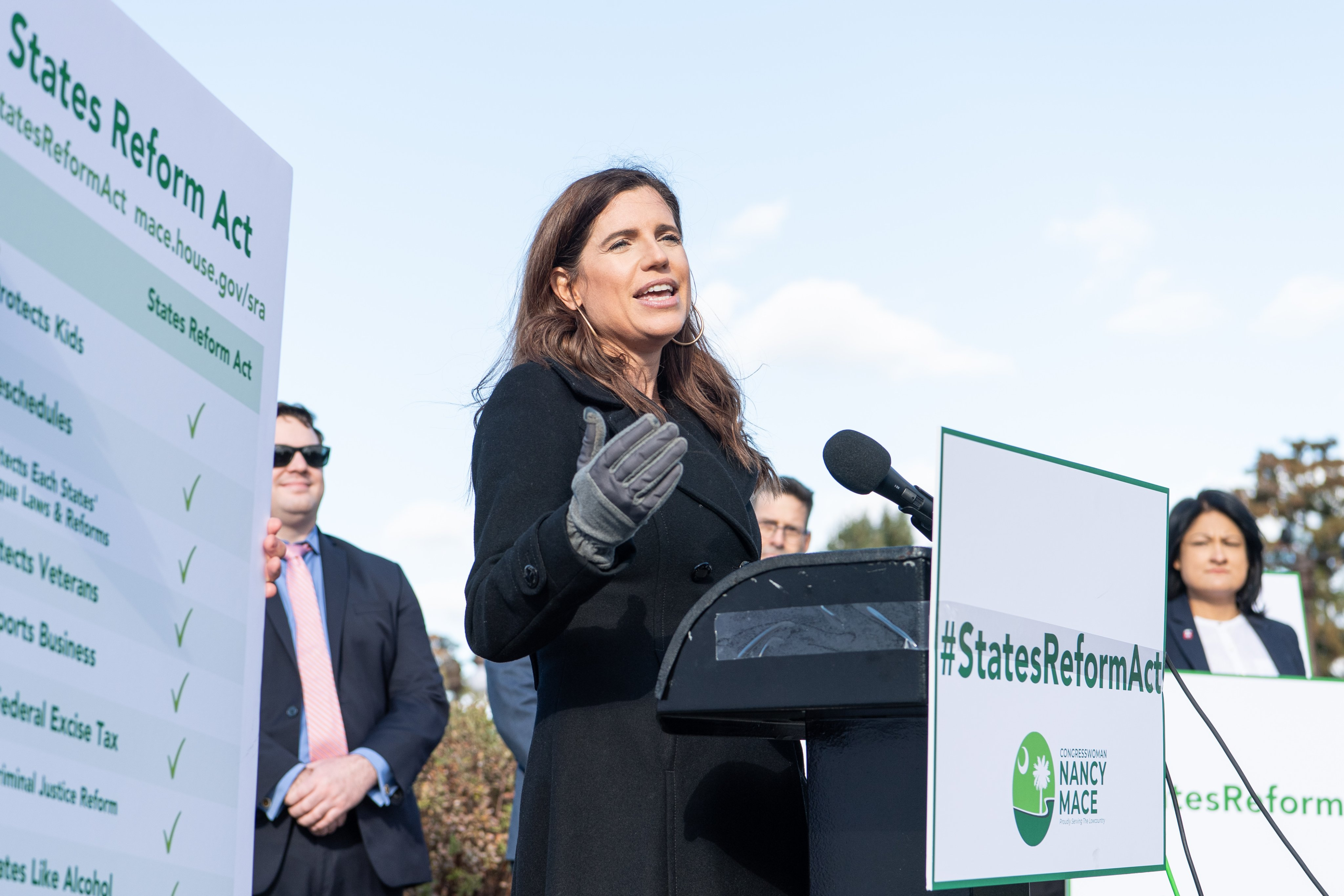
Mace speaking in support of the States Reform Act to legalize cannabis at the federal level in 2021

In 2021, Mace introduced the States Reform Act to remove cannabis from the Controlled Substances Act and regulate it similarly to alcohol. She said: "This bill supports veterans, law enforcement, farmers, businesses, those with serious illnesses, and it is good for criminal justice reform. ... The States Reform Act takes special care to keep Americans and their children safe while ending federal interference with state cannabis laws."

=== Towards other political figures ===
==== Steve Bannon ====
On October 21, 2021, Mace was one of nine House Republicans who voted to hold Steve Bannon in contempt of Congress for defying a subpoena to appear before the United States House Select Committee on the January 6 Attack. Explaining her vote, Mace said she was being "consistent" and wanted to retain the exercise of "the power to subpoena" in the event that Republicans regained control of the House of Representatives in 2022.

==== Liz Cheney ====
Mace opposed the first attempt to remove Liz Cheney as chair of the House Republican Conference, saying, "We should not be silencing voices of dissent. That is one of the reasons we are in this today, is that we have allowed QAnon conspiracy theorists to lead us." In early May, Mace appeared at fundraiser events with Cheney. During the second attempt to remove Cheney as chair, however, Mace voted to remove her.

==== Kamala Harris ====
On August 15, 2024, Mace received nationally circulated criticism for repeatedly mispronouncing Vice President and Democratic presidential candidate Kamala Harris' name after initially pronouncing her name correctly. After saying "Kamala" correctly, Mace began to mispronounce the name and, when corrected by other CNN panelists, Mace said "I will say Kamala's name any way that I want to."

==== Zohran Mamdani ====
Following the victory of Zohran Mamdani in the 2025 New York City Democratic mayoral primary, Mace wrote "After 9/11 we said 'Never Forget.' I think we sadly have forgotten." After Mamdani was elected mayor, Mace falsely said in a fundraising email that he was "bringing Sharia law to America".

==== Kevin McCarthy ====
Mace was one of eight Republicans who voted for the removal of Kevin McCarthy as Speaker of the House and the only one of those eight not considered a far-right politician by a 538 analysis of the 118th Congress. She fell in the "Compromise Conservatives" cluster instead, which the analysis noted tended to vote against hard-right messaging amendments but oppose bipartisan spending bills. Mace said she voted to vacate McCarthy out of distrust.

==== Donald Trump ====
Mace worked for Donald Trump's 2016 presidential campaign, but strongly condemned his actions surrounding the January 6 U.S. Capitol attack. She asserted that Trump's legacy had been "wiped out" and that he should be held "accountable" for his actions. She later voted against impeaching him, and, in 2024, endorsed him in the Republican presidential primary.

==== Sara Jacobs ====
In December 2025, Mace told Rep. Sara Jacobs (D-CA), who is Jewish, "I have a good surgeon if you ever want to get your nose done." Jacobs immediately criticized Mace for using an antisemitic stereotype.

== Personal life ==
Mace resides on Daniel Island in Charleston, South Carolina. On June 1, 2021, the Charleston Police Department opened an investigation after Mace's home was vandalized with profanity, three anarchy symbols, and graffiti in support of the PRO Act.

Mace is a non-denominational Christian. She has attended Seacoast Church, a South Carolina-based megachurch.

In February 2026, New York magazine interviewed several former staffers who worked for Mace. The staffers said she would drink alcohol and consume marijuana excessively, and make them bring her alcohol late at night for her parties and clean out the properties she rented out on Airbnb, including her home in Isle of Palms, South Carolina and her Washington townhouse. Following the article's publication, Mace claimed she is unable to drink alcohol due to hemochromatosis.

=== Relationships ===
Mace's first marriage was to Chris Niemiec, a lawyer and JAG Corps officer in the United States Air Force Reserve. After they divorced, Mace married Curtis Jackson, with whom she had two children. They divorced in 2019.

Mace became engaged to Patrick Bryant in 2022, but the couple broke up in 2023. She said that she broke off the engagement after finding Bryant on a dating app, a claim he denied.

In a February 2025 speech in the House of Representatives, Rep. Mace accused Bryant and three other men of physical abuse, rape, and sexual misconduct against her and other women. All three men denied her accusations. Her ex-fiancé claimed she had voiced the accusations only in Congress in order to shield herself from the legal liability to which she would be exposed had she made the accusations anywhere else. The following month, one of the men Mace accused sued her for defamation. That November, her former fiancé also sued her for defamation. As of October 14, 2026, one of the men has been charged with first-degree assault and battery and two counts of third-degree criminal sexual conduct, while two others have been charged with voyeurism.

== Electoral history ==
2014 United States Senate Republican primary election in South Carolina
Party	Candidate	Votes	%
Republican	Lindsey Graham (incumbent)	178,833	56.42%
Republican	Lee Bright	48,904	15.53%
Republican	Richard Cash	26,325	8.30%
Republican	Det Bowers	23,172	7.31%
Republican	Nancy Mace	19,634	6.19%
Republican	Bill Connor	16,912	5.34%
Republican	Benjamin Dunn	3,209	1.01%
Total votes		316,989	100.00%

South Carolina State House District 99 Republican primary, 2017 (special)
Party	Candidate	Votes	%
Republican	Nancy Mace	1,290	49.5%
Republican	Mark Smith	714	27.4%
Republican	Shawn Pinkston	373	14.3%
Republican	Jarrod Brooks	228	8.8%
Total votes		2,605	100.%

South Carolina State House District 99 Republican primary runoff, 2017 (special)
Party	Candidate	Votes	%
Republican	Nancy Mace	1,695	62.6%
Republican	Mark Smith	1,012	37.4%
Total votes		2,707	100.0%

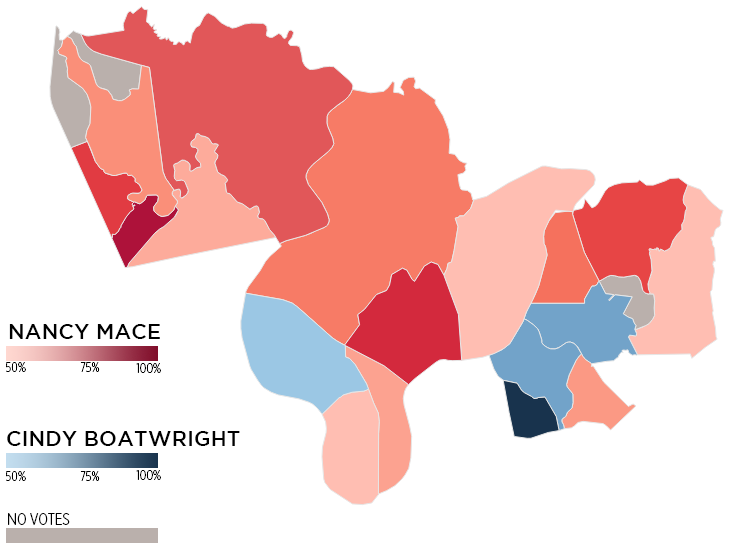
South Carolina House District 99 special election, 2018

2018 South Carolina House of Representatives District 99 special election
Party	Candidate	Votes	%
Republican	Nancy Mace (incumbent)	2,071	56.5%
Democratic	Cindy Boatwright	1,587	43.3%
Write-in		8	0.2%
Total votes		3,666	100.0%

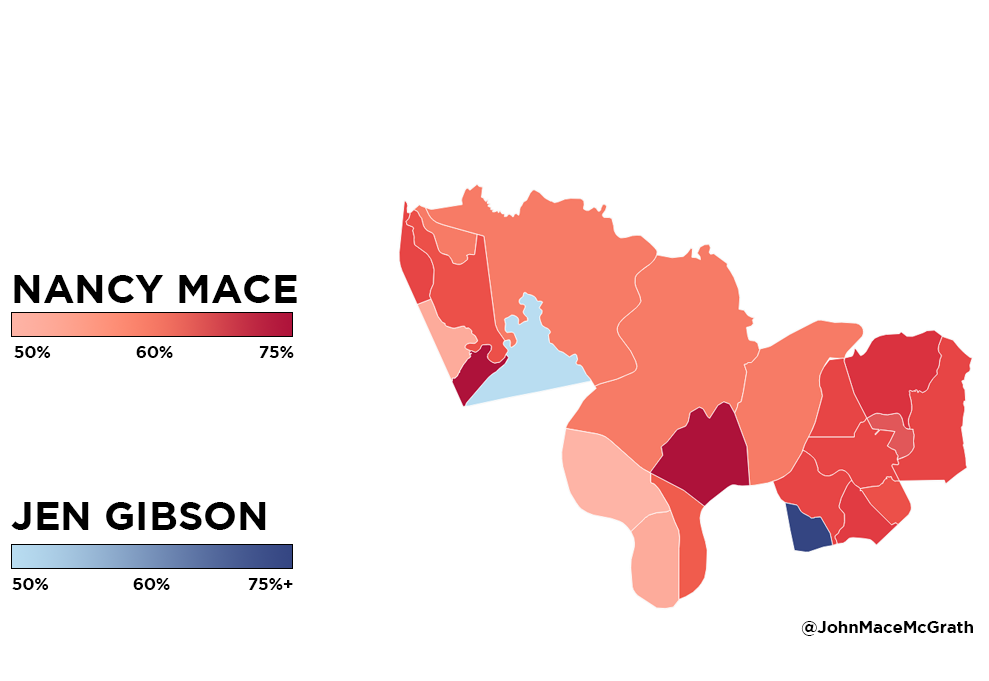
Nancy Mace vs. Jen Gibson, general election in South Carolina 99th House District on November 6, 2018

South Carolina State House District 99 general election, 2018
Party	Candidate	Votes	%
Republican	Nancy Mace	10,836	61.0%
Democratic	Jen Gibson	6,590	37.1%
Working Families	Jen Gibson	337	1.9%
Write-in		9	<0.1%
Total votes		17,772	100.0%
Republican hold			

South Carolina's 1st congressional district, Republican primary 2020
Party	Candidate	Votes	%
Republican	Nancy Mace	48,411	57.48%
Republican	Katherine D. Landing	21,835	25.92%
Republican	Chris Cox	8,179	9.71%
Republican	Brad Mole	5,800	6.89%

South Carolina's 1st congressional district, 2020
Party	Candidate	Votes	%
Republican	Nancy Mace	216,042	50.6%
Democratic	Joe Cunningham (incumbent)	210,627	49.3%
Write-in		442	0.1%
Total votes		427,111	100.0%
Republican gain from Democratic			

South Carolina's 1st congressional district, Republican primary results, 2022
Party	Candidate	Votes	%
Republican	Nancy Mace (incumbent)	39,470	53.14%
Republican	Katie Arrington	33,589	45.22%
Republican	Lynz Piper-Loomis	1,221	1.64%
Total votes		74,280	100%

2022 South Carolina's 1st congressional district election
Party	Candidate	Votes	%
Republican	Nancy Mace (incumbent)	153,757	56.39%
Democratic	Annie Andrews	115,796	42.47%
Alliance	Joseph Oddo	2,634	0.97%
Write-in		494	0.18%
Total votes		272,681	100.00%

2024 South Carolina's 1st congressional district Republican primary
Party	Candidate	Votes	%
Republican	Nancy Mace (incumbent)	28,300	56.8%
Republican	Catherine Templeton	14,849	29.8%
Republican	Bill Young	6,691	13.4%
Total votes		49,840	100.0%

2024 South Carolina's 1st congressional district election
Party	Candidate	Votes	%
Republican	Nancy Mace (incumbent)	227,502	58.2%
Democratic	Michael B Moore	162,582	41.6%
Write-in		693	0.2%
Total votes		390,777	100.0%

2026 South Carolina gubernatorial election Republican primary
Party	Candidate	Votes	%
Republican	Pamela Evette	136,480	28.9
Republican	Alan Wilson	123,643	26.2
Republican	Ralph Norman	80,790	17.1
Republican	Rom Reddy	66,992	14.2
Republican	Nancy Mace	57,380	12.1
Republican	Josh Kimbrell (withdrawn)	3,957	0.8
Republican	Jacqueline DuBose (decertified)	3,714	0.8
Total votes		472,956	100.0

U.S. House of Representatives
Preceded by Joe Cunningham	Member of the U.S. House of Representatives from South Carolina's 1st congressional district 2021–present	Incumbent
U.S. order of precedence (ceremonial)
Preceded by Teresa Leger Fernandez	United States representatives by seniority 260th	Succeeded by Nicole Malliotakis
