= Mark Smith (South Carolina politician) =

American politician

Member of the South Carolina House of Representatives from the 99th district
- In office November 9, 2020 – November 9, 2026
- Preceded by: Nancy Mace
- Succeeded by: Jarrod Brooks

Personal details
- Born: Marvin Smith; June 18, 1970 (age 56) Bamberg, South Carolina, U.S.
- Party: Republican
- Spouse: Elayne Forastiere (m. 1993)
- Children: 3 sons
- Education: Fayetteville Technical Community College (AS)

Marvin M. "Mark" Smith is an American businessman and politician who is a member of the South Carolina House of Representatives from the 99th District (parts of Berkeley County). He has served since 2020.

== Early life, education and career ==
Smith is a native of Bamberg, South Carolina. He earned an associate degree from Fayetteville Technical Community College.

A businessman, he is the owner and president of McAlister-Smith Funeral Homes, the Avinger Funeral Home, and the Palmetto Cremation Society.

== Political career ==
=== Town Council ===
Smith served on Mount Pleasant, South Carolina Town Council from 2013 until 2017.

=== South Carolina House of Representatives ===
In 2017, Smith became a Republican candidate for the 99th district South Carolina House of Representatives, losing to Nancy Mace.

In October 2019, Smith again announced his candidacy for the 99th district after Mace opted to run for the United States House of Representatives. Smith defeated David Herndon in the Republican primary and Democratic nominee Jen Gibson in the November general election.

=== 2026 US House of Representatives election ===
On August 14, 2025, Smith launched his bid to run for South Carolina 1st Congressional District, as incumbent Nancy Mace had announced her decision to run for governor of South Carolina.

== Personal life ==
Smith and his wife, Elayne (née Forastiere), have three children.
