= Jarrod Brooks =

American politician

Member of the South Carolina House of Representatives from the 99th district
- Incumbent
- Assumed office November 9, 2026
- Preceded by: Mark Smith

Personal details
- Party: Republican

Jarrod Brooks is an American politician. A member of the Republican Party, he is the member for the 99th district of the South Carolina House of Representatives. He was elected at the 2026 election. He was a Berkeley County Councilman.
