= Lisa Ellis (American politician) =

American politician and educator

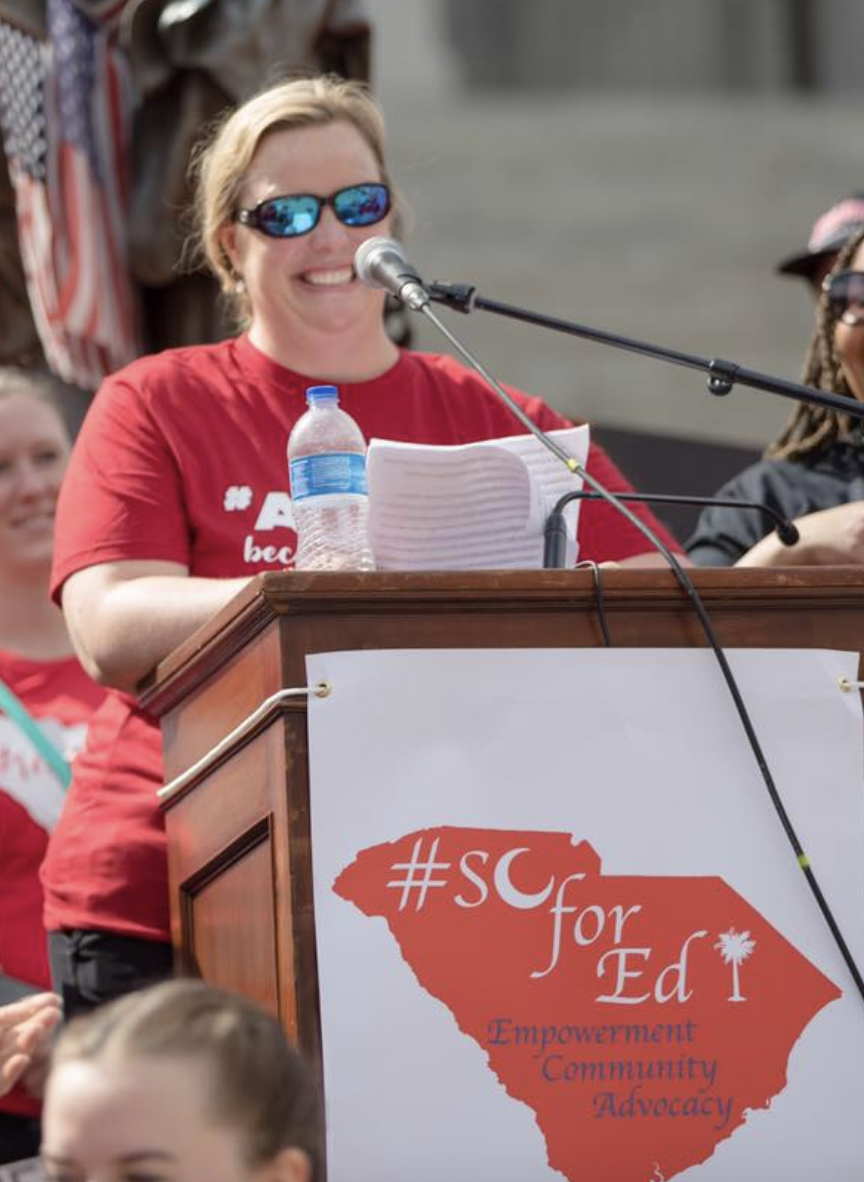

Personal details
- Born: August 28, 1975 (age 51) Columbia, South Carolina, U.S.
- Party: Democratic
- Education: College of Charleston (BA); Clemson University (MS); Columbia College (MA)

Lisa Ellis (born August 28, 1975) is an American educator who was the 2022 fusion candidate, Democratic, and Alliance Party nominee for South Carolina's superintendent of education and is the founder of the education advocacy group SC for Ed. She was defeated by Republican Ellen Weaver in the November 2022 general election. In September 2025, Ellis announced her 2026 candidacy for South Carolina's superintendent of education. She was defeated in the June 2026 Democratic primary by Sylvia Wright.

== Personal life and career ==
Ellis is an educator in Richland School District Two in Columbia, South Carolina. She is the student activities director at Blythewood High School. Additionally, she has taught at Ridge View High School, Hand Middle School, and Fairfield Middle School in Columbia. According to WLTX News, “Over her career, Ellis has earned the accolades of Honors Student Teacher of Excellence, Student Council Advisor of the Year, Staff of the Month, Columbia Business League Phenom, and more. She is also a CERRA Mentor and member of the Junior League of South Carolina.”.

In 2019, Ellis founded an educational advocacy group, SC for Ed, with the purposes of improving teacher retention, increasing teacher pay, and decreasing class sizes. In May 2019, SC for Ed led a march at the South Carolina Statehouse, in which over 10,000 people marched. In the years since the organizations founding, Ellis has led various marches and protests and advocated for stricter COVID-19 measures, including mask mandates and virtual learning, a reduction of gun violence in schools and higher teacher pay. After winning the June 2022 Democratic primary for state superintendent, Ellis stepped down from her position as executive director of SC for Ed to focus on her campaign. She is the only candidate to ever run for state superintendent of education while simultaneously remaining a classroom teacher.

== Politics ==
On June 14, 2022, Ellis won the Democratic primary against Gary Burgess, former Anderson County School District 4 Superintendent and Jerry Govan, South Carolina House representative. She secured 50.1% of the vote, avoiding a runoff election by 199 votes. In the debate for superintendent of education, Ellis advocated in favor of social and emotional learning (SEL), drawing criticism from Ellen Weaver and Kathy Maness, who accused the idea of being associated with Critical race theory and "theory-laden." Ellis and her opponent, Ellen Weaver, have garnered more news coverage and attention to the race for superintendent of education than most races in the past. Political experts have cited this as the most partisan election in recent history because of the current national spotlight on educational issues. Weaver has made claims that "woke indoctrination" has been taking place in schools. In a September 2022 interview, Ellis said that the General Assembly's attempt to outlaw the teaching of critical race theory was "unnecessary," and that the legislature has "created a ghost to get away from what is actually happening in schools" in an effort to redirect funding for public education to private schools.

Critics of Ellis, especially online media outlet FITSNews, which has a history of anti-labor positions, have labeled Ellis and her advocacy group as "liberal" or "mob" or "union." Local news outlets such as The State newspaper and WIS (TV) as well as members of the South Carolina General Assembly have cited data and opinions from Ellis in explaining issues like the state teacher shortage.

After winning the primary election, Ellis announced she would step down as executive director of SC for Ed, though she intends on remaining a classroom teacher throughout her campaign. Ellis was the first Democrat to run for superintendent since 2014; Molly Spearman ran unopposed in 2018. Ellis received the endorsement of the Majority Whip of the United States House of Representatives, Jim Clyburn, and of Jim Rex, the last Democrat to hold the office since 2011. Ellis was also the nominee for state superintendent of education for the Alliance Party.

In the 2022 debate for South Carolina state superintendent of education, Ellen Weaver accused the group of pushing progressive legislation and "pronoun politics," and also said that she believes that the group believes parents are "domestic terrorists." Ellis, on the other hand, "mostly avoided partisan talking points," according to The State.

Receiving 43% of the popular vote, Ellis lost the general election to Weaver. She conceded the election following day. In her concession statement, Ellis said, "We will continue to stay persistent and continue to fight for every student to have a high-quality education in our state," she said in the statement. "We have mobilized voters across our state who previously did not feel their voice mattered; we have given teachers and families a choice in who represents them and empowered them to use their voice." She continues to work as a full-time teacher and student activities director.

On September 5, 2025, Ellis announced her 2026 candidacy for South Carolina's superintendent of education. She was defeated in the June 2026 Democratic primary by Sylvia Wright.

=== Electoral history ===
Superintendent of Education Democratic Primary 2022
Party	Candidate	Votes	%
Democratic	Lisa Ellis	87,229	50.1%
Democratic	Gary Burgess	54,317	31.2%
Democratic	Jerry Govan Jr.	32,473	18.7%
Total votes		174,019	100%

2022 South Carolina Superintendent of Education election
Party	Candidate	Votes	%	±%
Republican	Ellen Weaver	937,493	55.52%	
Democratic	Lisa Ellis	722,013	42.76%	
Green	Patricia M. Mickel	27,468	1.63%	
Write-in		1,744	0.10%	
Total votes		1,688,718	100.00%	N/A
Republican hold				

Superintendent of Education Democratic Primary 2026
Party	Candidate	Votes	%
Democratic	Sylvia Wright	218,208	61.02%
Democratic	Lisa Ellis	139,391	38.98%

Party political offices
Preceded by Tom Thompson	Democratic nominee for South Carolina Superintendent of Education; 2022	Most recent
