= Jerry Govan Jr. =

American politician

Member, South Carolina House of Representatives District 93

Member of the South Carolina House of Representatives from the 95th district
- In office 1992–2022
- Succeeded by: Gilda-Cobb Hunter

Personal details
- Born: March 17, 1958 (age 68) Orangeburg, South Carolina, United States
- Party: Democratic

Jerry N. Govan Jr. (born March 17, 1958) is an American politician. He was member of South Carolina House of Representatives District 93.

== Political career ==
=== South Carolina House of Representatives ===
Govan served as a member of the South Carolina House of Representatives from the 95th District from 1992 to 2022. He is a member of the Democratic party. He chaired the South Carolina Legislative Black Caucus.

=== 2022 Secretary of Education race ===
In 2022, after redistricting impacted his district, Govan announced his candidacy for state secretary of education rather than run for re-election. He faced Lisa Ellis and Gary Burgess in the Democratic primary. Govan did not advance to the general election. South Carolina House of Representatives District 95 is represented by Gilda Cobb-Hunter.

Superintendent of Education Democratic Primary 2022
Party	Candidate	Votes	%
Democratic	Lisa Ellis	87,229	50.1%
Democratic	Gary Burgess	54,317	31.2%
Democratic	Jerry Govan Jr.	32,473	18.7%
Total votes		174,019	100%

Govan attended the 2024 Democratic National Convention as an At-Large delegate.

=== 2024 South Carolina House race ===
In March 2024, Govan filed to run in the Democratic Primary for State House of Representatives, District 93, the seat held by incumbent Russell Ott, who was running for State Senate Seat 26.

Govan was opposed in the Democratic Primary by attorney Johnny Felder, whose father, John Felder, previously held the seat. Govan and Felder bested two other Democratic candidates, Phillip Ford and Chris Roland, to face each other in a Primary runoff. Govan defeated Felder to become the Democratic Nominee.

Govan went on to defeat Republican candidate Krista Hassell and South Carolina Workers Party candidate Harold Geddings in the general election.
