= 2022 South Carolina State Treasurer election =

- November 8, 2022
- Turnout: 50.86%
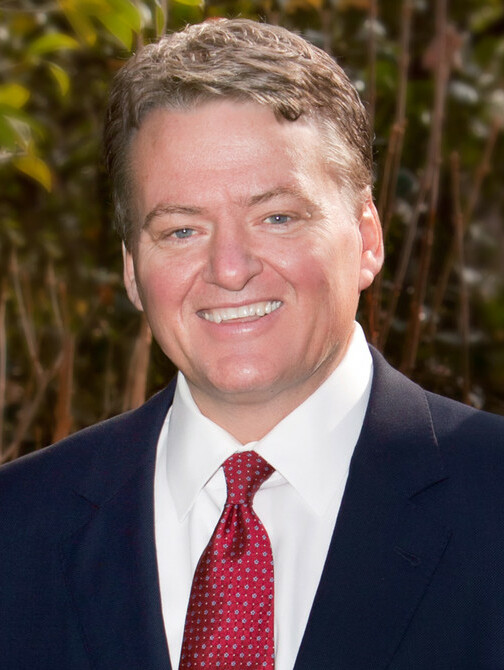

Candidate	Curtis Loftis	Sarah E. Work
Party	Republican	Alliance
Popular vote	1,129,961	281,695
Percentage	79.67%	19.86%
- Loftis: 40–50% 50–60% 60–70% 70–80% 80–90% >90% Work: 40–50% 50–60% 60–70% 70–80% 80–90% >90% Tie: 40–50% 50% No votes
Treasurer before election
Curtis Loftis
Republican
Elected Treasurer
Curtis Loftis
Republican

The 2022 South Carolina State Treasurer election took place on November 8, 2022, to elect the next South Carolina Treasurer. Incumbent Republican Party Treasurer Curtis Loftis was re-elected to a fourth term in office.

== Republican primary ==
=== Candidates ===
==== Nominee ====
- Curtis Loftis, incumbent South Carolina Treasurer

== Alliance party ==
=== Candidates ===
==== Nominee ====
- Sarah E. Work, accountant

== General election ==
=== Results ===
2022 South Carolina Treasurer election
Party	Candidate	Votes	%	±%
Republican	Curtis Loftis (incumbent)	1,129,961	79.67%	+23.72%
Alliance	Sarah E. Work	281.695	19.86%	+18.33%
	Write-in	6,630	0.47%	+0.43%
Total votes		1,418,286	100.00%	
Republican hold				

==== By county ====
County	Curtis Loftis Republican		All Others Other parties	
County	#	%	#	%
Abbeville	6,446	89.59%	749	10.41%
Aiken	38,893	83.10%	7,912	16.91%
Allendale	632	66.18%	323	33.82%
Anderson	50,263	87.37%	7,267	12.63%
Bamberg	1,902	75.21%	627	24.80%
Barnwell	3,908	83.95%	747	16.05%
Beaufort	47,430	80.09%	11,793	19.91%
Berkeley	46,562	78.17%	13,006	21.83%
Calhoun	3,659	82.54%	774	17.46%
Charleston	87,046	70.34%	36,710	29.66%
Cherokee	12,978	90.41%	1,376	9.59%
Chester	6,225	80.70%	1,489	19.30%
Chesterfield	8,580	84.36%	1,591	15.65%
Clarendon	6,945	83.19%	1,403	16.81%
Colleton	8,056	81.10%	1,877	18.89%
Darlington	12,631	84.17%	2,376	15.83%
Dillon	4,557	81.96%	1,003	18.04%
Dorchester	32,173	76.21%	1,042	23.79%
Edgefield	6,240	86.74%	954	13.27%
Fairfield	4,365	68.04%	2,050	31.96%
Florence	25,716	79.40%	6,671	20.60%
Georgetown	18,320	83.96%	3,500	16.04%
Greenville	125,118	81.11%	29,131	18.88%
Greenwood	15,659	84.58%	2,855	15.42%
Hampton	2,903	75.56%	939	24.44%
Horry	100,836	86.90%	15,202	13.11%
Jasper	6,821	77.78%	1,949	22.23%
Kershaw	15,904	83.30%	3,189	16.70%
Lancaster	24,315	82.07%	5,310	17.93%
Laurens	15,060	87.82%	2,089	12.18%
Lee	2,353	78.54%	643	21.46%
Lexington	74,407	82.91%	15,337	17.09%
Marion	4,293	74.86%	1,442	25.15%
Marlboro	3,499	75.56%	1,132	24.45%
McCormick	2,901	83.51%	573	16.50%
Newberry	9,405	86.55%	1,461	13.45%
Oconee	23,658	88.53%	3,066	11.47%
Orangeburg	11,124	69.19%	4,954	30.81%
Pickens	32,928	87.97%	4,503	12.03%
Richland	57,400	59.60%	38,904	40.40%
Saluda	5,096	89.00%	630	11.00%
Spartanburg	71,043	84.82%	12,717	15.18%
Sumter	16,491	72.98%	6,107	27.02%
Union	6,196	84.41%	1,144	15.58%
Williamsburg	4,460	70.78%	1,841	29.22%
York	64,564	77.30%	18,965	22.71%
Totals	1,129,961	79.67%	288,325	20.34%

Counties that flipped from Democratic to Republican

- Allendale (largest municipality: Allendale)
- Fairfield (largest municipality: Winnsboro)
- Lee (largest municipality: Bishopville)
- Marion (largest municipality: Marion)
- Orangeburg (largest municipality: Orangeburg)
- Richland (largest municipality: Columbia)
- Sumter (largest municipality: Sumter)
- Williamsburg (largest municipality: Kingstree)
- Bamberg (largest municipality: Bamberg)
- Calhoun (largest municipality: St. Matthews)
- Charleston (largest municipality: Charleston)
- Hampton (largest municipality: Hampton)
- Jasper (largest municipality: Hardeeville)
- Clarendon (largest municipality: Manning)
- Marlboro (largest municipality: Bennettsville)
