= Curtis Loftis =

American politician (born 1958)

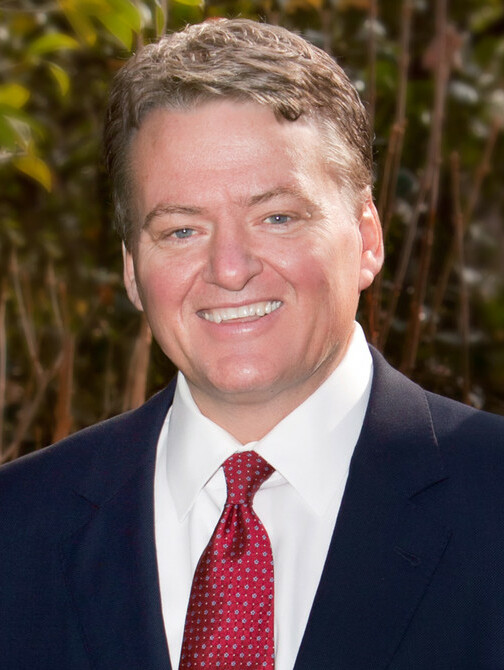

Treasurer of South Carolina
- Incumbent
- Assumed office January 12, 2011
- Governor: Nikki Haley; Henry McMaster; Alan Wilson (elect)
- Preceded by: Converse Chellis

Personal details
- Born: September 8, 1958 (age 68) Columbia, South Carolina, U.S.
- Party: Republican
- Education: University of South Carolina, Columbia (AA)

Curtis M. Loftis Jr. (born September 8, 1958) is an American politician. He currently serves as the Treasurer of South Carolina. A member of the Republican Party, Loftis has held elective office since 2010.

== Early life, education and career ==
Loftis was born in Columbia, South Carolina. He attended Brookland-Cayce High School and graduated with an associate's from the University of South Carolina in 1981. Loftis was elected president of the Student Senate and served as president of the Pi Kappa Alpha fraternity.

=== Business and philanthropy ===
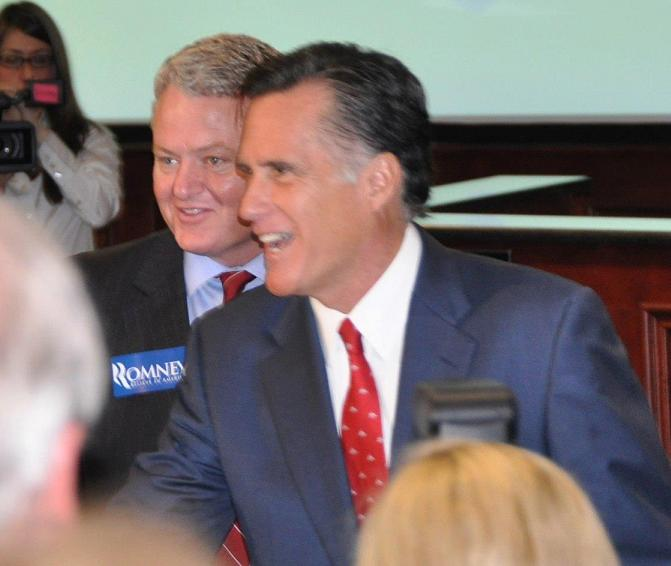
Loftis with Mitt Romney in North Charleston, South Carolina in September 2011

Loftis owns Home Pest Control, headquartered in Cayce, South Carolina, though he no longer runs the day-to-day operations. He also invests in and develops real estate.

In 1999, Loftis established Saluda Charitable Foundation (SCF) and remains the principal benefactor. The foundation's activities are faith-based and provide nutritional and housing services to orphans and the elderly. After the 2010 Haiti earthquake, SCF paid to send two doctors to Haiti to provide medical aid.

== Political career ==
=== State Treasurer of South Carolina 2010 election ===
In March 2010, Loftis announced his candidacy for Treasurer of South Carolina in the Republican primary. Loftis characterized himself as a conservative reform candidate.

Loftis was endorsed by former Massachusetts Governor Mitt Romney, former Arkansas Governor Mike Huckabee, former Pennsylvania Senator Rick Santorum, and former US Speaker of the House Newt Gingrich. Loftis received many state Tea Party movement endorsements including many in the business community and several newspaper endorsements.

On June 8, 2010, Loftis defeated the incumbent State Treasurer, Converse Chellis in the Republican Primary with 62% of the vote, carrying all of the state's 46 counties. He became the first Republican to defeat a sitting incumbent in a statewide GOP primary.

Loftis is the Vice Chairman of the State Fiscal Accountability Authority, and chairs the Board of Financial Institutions which supervises state chartered financial institutions and supervises mortgage originators and lenders, finance companies, pay day lenders, and title lenders. He appoints members to the South Carolina Retirement System Investment Commission.

Loftis served as State Chairman of Mitt Romney's 2012 campaign in South Carolina. Treasurer Loftis served as the Chairman of South Carolina's delegation to the 2012 Republican National Convention in Tampa, Fl.

=== 2014 election ===
Treasurer Loftis won the Primary with 62% of the vote and was unopposed in the general election to remain the State Treasurer.

=== 2018 election ===
Treasurer Curtis Loftis defeated Rosalyn Glenn (D) and Sarah Work (American Party) in the general election on November 6, 2018.

=== 2022 election ===
Treasurer Curtis Loftis had no primary opponent and as such was automatically the Republican nominee. No Democratic candidate filed to challenge Treasure Loftis, and he defeated Sarah Work (Alliance Party of South Carolina) in the general election on November 8, 2022. The election results were 1,129,961 (79.67%) for Loftis vs. 281,695 (19.86%) for Work.

=== 2026 election ===
Loftis filed to run for re-election in 2026. On June 9, 2026, Vincent Coe received 195,498 votes (55.8%) to Trav Robertson Jr.'s 155,080 votes (44.2%) in the Democratic primary; as a result, Coe will face Loftis in the general election.

== Controversies ==
=== COVID-19 Pandemic Facebook post ===
In June 2020, during the 2020 Black Lives Matter protests and immediately following the COVID-19 quarantine, Loftis posted about being tired of "looters, curfews, lockdowns, and weaponized pandemics" on Facebook. He would later delete the post.

=== State budget discrepancy ===
In 2024, Loftis became embroiled in a battle over who was responsible for $1.8 billion that was left sitting in state accounts for several years, unbeknownst to legislators, some of whom wanted to remove him from office. The money never had been properly distributed to state agencies because, Loftis said, it did not have the required codes when it was put into a special account during a software transition. Legislators were alerted to the $1.8 billion by the state's new comptroller general.

State law requires the treasurer to publish quarterly reports showing which banks hold state funds. But when Loftis, under intense questioning from legislators, threatened to publish a report online that contained state bank account numbers, the attorney general prepared to go to the state Supreme Court to block that. Loftis backed down after calls from the chief of the State Law Enforcement Division and Gov. Henry McMaster.

On January 16, 2025, State Representative Heather Bauer filed legislation that begins impeachment proceedings against Treasurer Loftis. Senator Larry Grooms also called for his resignation due to the enormous accounting error inflicted on the state.

== Electoral history ==
2010 South Carolina Treasurer Republican primary
Party	Candidate	Votes	%
Republican	Curtis Loftis	239,296	61.6%
Republican	Converse Chellis (incumbent)	149,191	38.4%
Total votes		388,487	100.0%

2010 South Carolina Treasurer general election
Party	Candidate	Votes	%
Republican	Curtis Loftis	907,755	98.9%
Write-in		9,748	1.1%
Total votes		917,503	100.0%
Republican hold			

2014 South Carolina Treasurer Republican primary
Party	Candidate	Votes	%
Republican	Curtis Loftis (incumbent)	177,854	62.0%
Republican	Brian Adams	108,934	38.0%
Total votes		286,788	100.0%

2014 South Carolina Treasurer general election
Party	Candidate	Votes	%
Republican	Curtis Loftis (incumbent)	857,526	98.8%
Write-in		10,819	1.2%
Total votes		868,345	100.0%
Republican hold			

2018 South Carolina Treasurer general election
Party	Candidate	Votes	%
Republican	Curtis Loftis (incumbent)	952,233	56.0%
Democratic	Rosalyn Glenn	694,200	40.8%
Working Families	Rosalyn Glenn	28,777	1.7%
American	Sarah Work	25,979	1.5%
Write-in		711	0.0%
Total votes		1,701,900	100.0%
Republican hold			

2022 South Carolina Treasurer general election
Party	Candidate	Votes	%
Republican	Curtis Loftis (incumbent)	1,129,961	79.7%
Alliance Party of South Carolina	Sarah Work	281,695	19.9%
Write-in		6,630	0.5%
Total votes		1,418,286	100.0%
Republican hold			

Party political offices
Preceded by Thomas Ravenel	Republican nominee for Treasurer of South Carolina; 2010, 2014, 2018, 2022, 2026	Most recent
Political offices
Preceded by Converse Chellis	Treasurer of South Carolina; 2011–present	Incumbent
