= FITSNews =

News website in South Carolina, United States

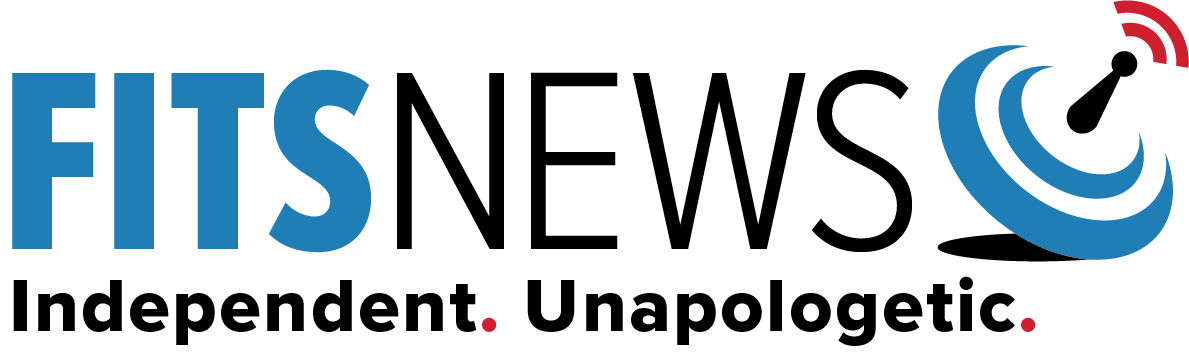
- Screenshot
- Website type: News
- Available in: English
- Founded: 2006
- Area served: South Carolina, United States
- Founder: Will Folks (Founding Editor)
- Key people: Dylan Nolan (Director of Special Projects); Jenn Wood (Director of Research)
- Website: fitsnews.com
- Commercial: Yes
- Registration: Optional
- Current status: Active

FITSNews is a United States–based news website that covers politics and current events in South Carolina.

== History ==
FITSNews founder Will Folks worked as a campaign staffer and spokesman for Republican Gov. Mark Sanford until 2005, when Folks resigned and pleaded guilty to a domestic violence charge. Folks has been called by The State the "bad boy of South Carolina journalism", and a "Palmetto State politico with a reputation as a hell raiser" by The Guardian.

Folks announced he was reviving his political consulting company Viewpolitik in 2005 and founded FITSNews in 2006. FITSNews covers news and events in South Carolina.

Columbia Journalism Review has described FITSNews a "conservative-libertarian website covering politics", and as "a must-read for Palmetto State politicos". The New York Times said it is a "jarring mix of political scoops ... and photos of scantily clad women accompanied by off-color remarks."

Nancy Mace, who has served in both the South Carolina and United States House of Representatives, was a onetime co-owner of the site. She began working for Folks in 2007 by providing marketing and technical support for the site. Mace sold her stake in 2013.

FITSNews was named to The Washington Post's list of the "best state political blogs" in the country in 2010.

Later that year, as South Carolina state Rep. Nikki Haley campaigned in a Republican primary for governor, Folks published a series of blog posts claiming that Haley had engaged in an extramarital affair with him. Haley denied the allegations. Politico magazine compared the episode to the Bill Clinton sex scandal of the 1990s.

In 2017 FITSNews was sued for libel by former South Carolina legislator Kenny Bingham over a story it published which cited anonymous sources alleging ethics violations by Bingham. After Folks refused to reveal the site's sources for the story, Bingham's attorney sought to have him held in contempt of court. The South Carolina Press Association supported FITSNews' defense against the potential contempt citation, which judge William P. Keesley declined to impose. A jury ultimately ruled in favor of Bingham, and imposed nominal damages of $1 on FITSNews.

"FITS" stands for "Faith in the Sound", referencing a George Michael lyric.
