= Alliance Party (United States) =

American political party

- Chairperson: Michelle Griffith
- Founded: October 14, 2018; 8 years ago
- Registered: January 4, 2019; 7 years ago
- Headquarters: Ludington, Michigan
- Ideology: Anti-corruption; Electoral reform; Gun control; Universal health care; Universal basic income
- Political position: Center-left
- Colors: Cyan
- Seats in the Senate: 0 / 100
- Seats in the House of Representatives: 0 / 435
- State governorships: 0 / 50
- Seats in state upper chambers: 0 / 1,972
- Seats in state lower chambers: 0 / 5,411
- Territorial governorships: 0 / 5
- Seats in territorial upper chambers: 0 / 97
- Seats in territorial lower chambers: 0 / 91
- Other elected offices: 0

Website
- theallianceparty.com

The Alliance Party is a center-left American political party formed in 2019. It is affiliated with the Alliance Party of South Carolina, the Independent Party of Connecticut, and the Reform Party of Florida. In 2020, the Independence Party of New York affiliated with the Alliance Party, but disaffiliated in 2021. In 2025, the Independence-Alliance Party of Minnesota disaffiliated with the Alliance Party after a reverse merger with the Forward Party of Minnesota to form the Forward-Independence Party of Minnesota.

== History ==
=== Formation ===
On May 10, 2016, the Independence Party of Minnesota and the Independent Party of Oregon announced that they would seek to unite fourteen centrist minor political parties and possibly run a presidential candidate. Bernie Sanders won the Independent Party of Oregon's presidential primary, but could not run due to sore-loser legislation and the Independent Party of Oregon chose to not nominate a presidential candidate. The Independence Party of Minnesota gave its presidential nomination to Evan McMullin.

The Alliance Party was formed on October 14, 2018. On December 17, 2018, the American Party of South Carolina successfully asked the South Carolina Election Commission to record that the party had changed its name to the Alliance Party. On May 4, 2019, the Independence Party of Minnesota voted to affiliate with the Alliance Party at its state convention. The Independent Party of Connecticut also affiliated with the Alliance Party and the Alliance Party became ballot qualified in Mississippi.

=== 2020 presidential election ===
On April 25, 2020, the party nominated businessman Rocky De La Fuente for president and historian Darcy Richardson for vice president. The ticket was approved by a vote of twenty-four to two. The convention was conducted through Zoom, chaired by Jim Rex, and attended by delegates including Greg Orman, Brian Moore, and Michael Steinberg.

On June 20, the Reform Party nominated De La Fuente and Richardson. De la Fuente defeated three other recognized candidates, Max Abramson, Souraya Faas, and Ben Zion. On June 23, the Natural Law Party of Michigan nominated De La Fuente and Richardson. On August 15, the American Independent Party nominated De La Fuente, but chose Kanye West rather than Richardson as their vice-presidential nominee.

De La Fuente and Richardson received 88,238 votes in the presidential election, around 0.06% of the national total. Following the presidential election, the American Delta Party and the Independence Party of New York joined the Alliance Party.

== Policy positions ==
In the Alliance Party's manifesto, they value addressing incidences of violence, the individual carbon footprint, social and economic mobility, children's education, and the transformation of the current American political system.

=== Healthcare ===
The Alliance Party's healthcare policy composes providing universal access to medically necessary care for primary, specialty, psychiatric, and emergency medical care. Additionally, the Alliance Party values universal healthcare access for all stages of pregnancy and postpartum care. Protection of public health, via the creation of a fully funded "Pandemic Task Force", and caring for elderly patients, are also valued in their healthcare policy.

=== Gun control ===
The Alliance Party values reducing easy and immediate access to firearms by instituting universal background checks, closing loopholes in firearm regulation, requiring state and federal agencies to relay information swiftly in a national background system, establishing a culture of gun safety, banning large-capacity magazines, banning modifications to weaponry, creation of a national red-flag law, and strengthening of mental health infrastructure.

=== Environment ===
The Alliance Party's environmental policy consists of a gradual transition from a fossil-fuel ran economy, establishing regulations on greenhouse gas emissions, protection of natural resources, strengthening and reinforcing community environmental sustainability, and investing into national lead pipe replacement.

=== Income inequality ===
The Alliance Party advocates for setting corporate tax rates to globally competitive levels, instituting a flat individual income tax and a progressive tax on wealth and estates, simplifying the tax code, raising the federal minimum wage, providing a universal basic income, and eliminating the cap on taxable earnings to reform Social Security.

=== Electoral reform ===
The Alliance Party values the institution of same-day voter registration for all unregistered voters, institution of Ranked Choice Voting, overturning Citizens United v. FEC, ensuring election integrity, mandating disclosure of tax returns, imposition of term limits on politicians, and introduction of a recall process.

== Elections ==
=== 2024 presidential election ===
On May 31, 2024, the Alliance Party of South Carolina nominated Robert F. Kennedy, Jr. for president in the 2024 presidential election, granting him ballot access in that state. However, on August 23 Kennedy suspended his campaign and endorsed Donald Trump for the office. On August 27, Kennedy was named on Trump's transition team. In a September fundraising email, the Kennedy campaign asked his supporters to vote Trump regardless of where they live. Despite this, he asked for the Supreme Court to keep his name on the New York ballot.

=== Party leadership ===
- Michelle Griffith – National Chair
- Philip Fuehrer – National Vice Chair
- Ethan Michelle Gantz – National Vice Chair
- Connie Tewes – National Treasurer

== Electoral history ==
=== President and vice president ===
Year	Nominees		Performance				
Year	President	Vice President	Votes	Percentage	±%	Electoral votes	Ballot access
2024	Robert F. Kennedy Jr.	Nicole Shanahan	619,232	0.4%	+0.36%	0	124 / 538
2020	Rocky De La Fuente	Darcy Richardson	88,238	0.06%	N/A	0	180 / 538

=== Best results in major races ===
Office	Percent	Result	State / District	Year	Candidate
President	0.34%	5th	California	2020	Rocky De La Fuente
President	0.18%	5th	Rhode Island	2020	Rocky De La Fuente
President	0.17%	7th	Idaho	2020	Rocky De La Fuente
U.S. House	0.97%	3rd	South Carolina's 1st congressional district	2022	Joseph Oddo
Governor	0.72%	5th	Minnesota	2022	Hugh McTavish
Treasurer	19.86%	2nd	South Carolina Treasurer	2022	Sarah E. Work
State legislature	24.36%	2nd	Minnesota State House District 5B	2022	Gregg Hendrickson
State legislature	20.57%	2nd	Washington State House District 8	2020	Larry Stanley
State legislature	18.75%	2nd	South Carolina State House District 8	2020	Jackie Todd
City Council	26.97%	Won	Shorewood, Minnesota City Council	2022	Guy Sanschagrin
