= 2014 United States House of Representatives elections in South Carolina =

- November 4, 2014

All 7 South Carolina seats to the United States House of Representatives
| | Majority party | Minority party |
|---|---|---|
| Party | Republican | Democratic |
| Last election | 6 | 1 |
| Seats won | 6 | 1 |
| Seat change | Steady | Steady |
| Popular vote | 734,456 | 382,208 |
| Percentage | 63.55% | 33.07% |
| Swing | ▲6.63% | ▼8.13% |

Republican
40–50%
50–60%
60–70%
70–80%
80–90%
90–100%
Democratic
40–50%
50–60%
60–70%
70–80%
Winners
Republican Hold
Democratic Hold

The 2014 United States House of Representatives elections in South Carolina were held on Tuesday, November 4, 2014, to elect the 7 U.S. representatives from the state of South Carolina, one from each of the state's 7 congressional districts. The elections coincided with the elections of other federal and state offices, including Governor of South Carolina.

== Overview ==
United States House of Representatives elections in South Carolina, 2014
| Party | Votes | Percentage | Seats | +/– |
|---|---|---|---|---|
| Republican | 734,456 | 63.55% | 6 | - |
| Democratic | 382,208 | 33.07% | 1 | — |
| Libertarian | 25,145 | 2.18% | 0 | — |
| Labor | 4,158 | 0.36% | 0 | — |
| Others | 9,815 | 0.85% | 0 | — |
| Totals | 1,155,782 | 100.00% | 7 | - |

=== By district ===
Results of the 2014 United States House of Representatives elections in South Carolina by district:

| District | Republican | | Democratic | | Others | | Total | | Result |
| District | Votes | % | Votes | % | Votes | % | Votes | % | Result |
|---|---|---|---|---|---|---|---|---|---|
| District 1 | 119,392 | 93.41% | 0 | 0.00% | 8,423 | 6.59% | 127,815 | 100.00% | Republican hold |
| District 2 | 121,649 | 62.45% | 68,719 | 35.27% | 4,440 | 2.28% | 194,808 | 100.00% | Republican hold |
| District 3 | 116,741 | 71.18% | 47,181 | 28.77% | 87 | 0.05% | 164,009 | 100.00% | Republican hold |
| District 4 | 126,452 | 84.84% | 0 | 0.00% | 22,597 | 15.16% | 149,049 | 100.00% | Republican hold |
| District 5 | 103,078 | 58.85% | 66,802 | 38.14% | 5,265 | 3.01% | 175,145 | 100.00% | Republican hold |
| District 6 | 44,311 | 25.55% | 125,747 | 72.50% | 3,374 | 1.95% | 173,432 | 100.00% | Democratic hold |
| District 7 | 102,833 | 59.95% | 68,576 | 39.98% | 115 | 0.07% | 171,524 | 100.00% | Republican hold |
| Total | 734,456 | 63.55% | 377,025 | 32.62% | 44,301 | 3.83% | 1,155,782 | 100.00% | . |

== District 1 ==
2014 South Carolina's 1st congressional district election
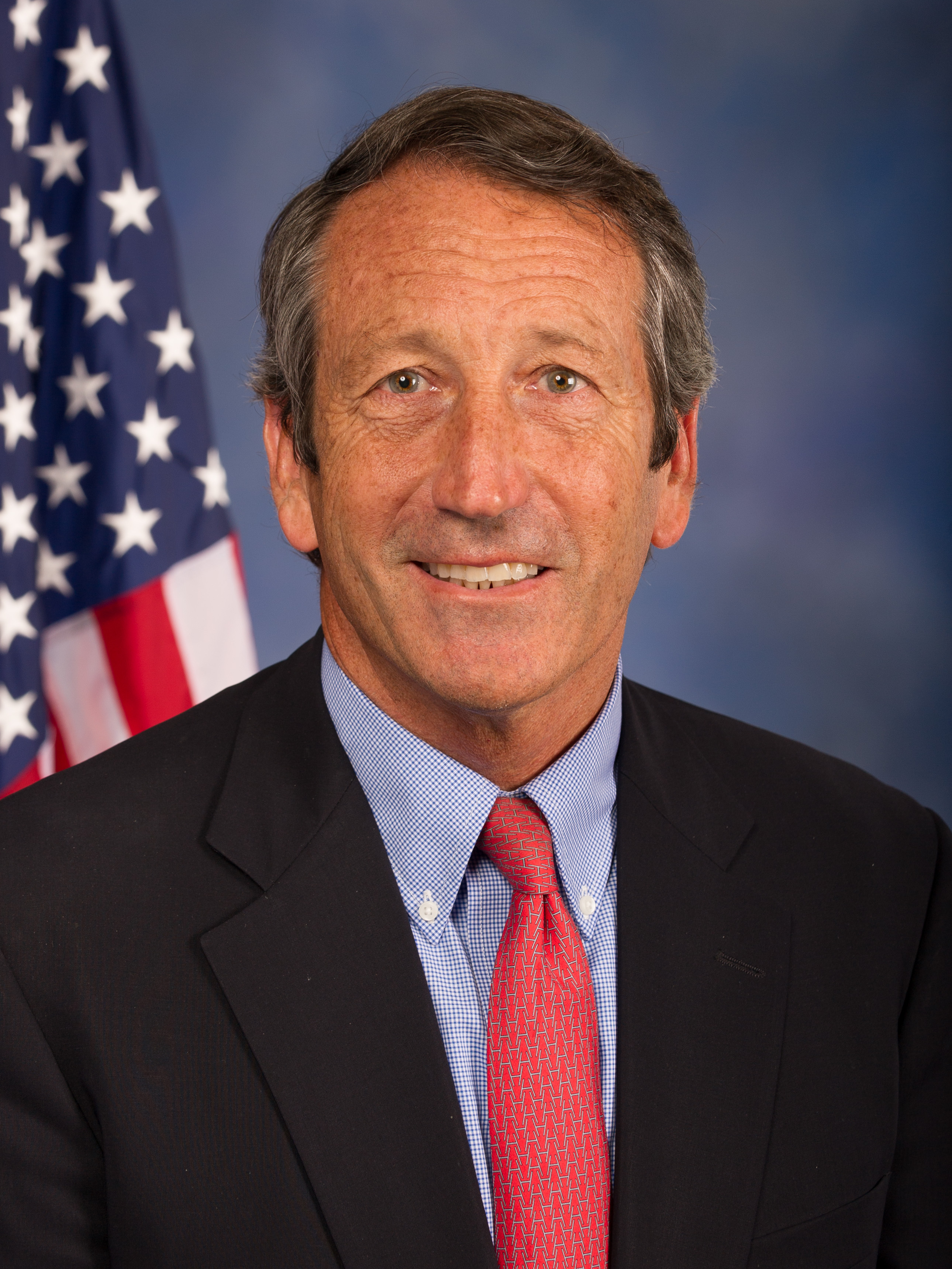
| Nominee | Mark Sanford |
| Party | Republican |
| Popular vote | 119,392 |
| Percentage | 93.4% |
U.S. Representative before election
Mark Sanford
Republican
Elected U.S. Representative
Mark Sanford
Republican

The 1st district is located on the Atlantic coastal plain, from Seabrook Island to the border with North Carolina and includes most of Charleston and Myrtle Beach. The incumbent was Republican Mark Sanford, who had represented the district since 2013, and previously from 1995 to 2001. He was elected with 54% of the vote in a special election in 2013, and the district has a PVI of R+11.

=== Republican primary ===
==== Candidates ====
===== Nominee =====
- Mark Sanford, incumbent U.S. Representative

===== Declined =====
- Ajay Bruno, conservative radio host

=== Democratic primary ===
==== Candidates ====
===== Declined =====
- Robert Burton, pilot and retired Air Force Colonel
- Elizabeth Colbert Busch, director of business development at Clemson University’s Restoration Institute and nominee for this seat 2013
- Wendell Gilliard, state representative
- Blaine Lotz, Chairman of the Beaufort County Democratic Party
- Bobbie Rose, former teacher and nominee for this seat 2012
- Martin Skelly, businessman
- Leon Stavrinakis, state representative

=== General election ===
==== Campaign ====
Sanford ran for re-election unopposed.

==== Predictions ====
| Source | Ranking | As of |
|---|---|---|
| The Cook Political Report | Safe R | November 3, 2014 |
| Rothenberg | Safe R | October 24, 2014 |
| Sabato's Crystal Ball | Safe R | October 30, 2014 |
| RCP | Safe R | November 2, 2014 |
| Daily Kos Elections | Safe R | November 4, 2014 |

==== Results ====
South Carolina's 1st congressional district, 2014
| Party | Candidate | Votes | % |
|---|---|---|---|
| Republican | Mark Sanford (incumbent) | 119,392 | 93.4 |
| n/a | Write-ins | 8,423 | 6.6 |
| Total votes | | 127,815 | 100.0 |
| Republican hold | | | |

== District 2 ==
2014 South Carolina's 2nd congressional district election
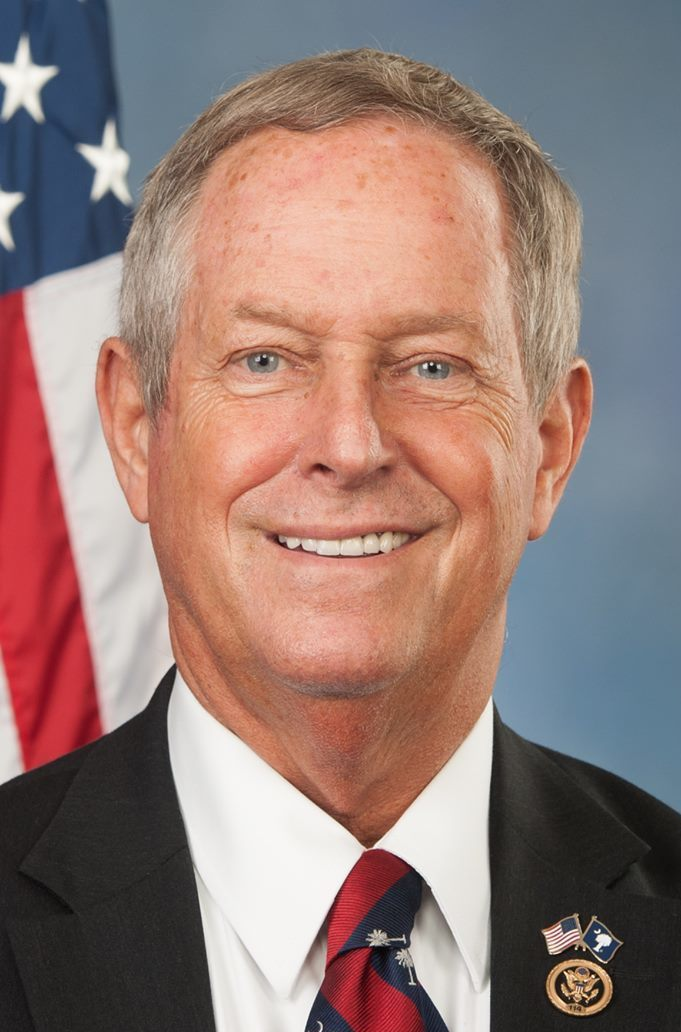

| Nominee | Joe Wilson | Phil Black |
| Party | Republican | Democratic |
| Popular vote | 121,649 | 68,719 |
| Percentage | 62.5% | 35.3% |
- County results Wilson: 40–50% 50–60% 60–70% 70–80% Black: 50–60%
U.S. Representative before election
Joe Wilson
Republican
Elected U.S. Representative
Joe Wilson
Republican

The 2nd district is located in central South Carolina. The incumbent was Republican Joe Wilson, who had represented the district since 2001. He was re-elected with 96% of the vote in 2012, and the district has a PVI of R+16.

=== Republican primary ===
==== Candidates ====
===== Nominee =====
- Joe Wilson, incumbent U.S. Representative

===== Eliminated in primary =====
- Eddie McCain, Libertarian nominee for the seat in 2010

==== Results ====
Republican primary results
| Party | Candidate | Votes | % |
|---|---|---|---|
| Republican | Joe Wilson (incumbent) | 43,687 | 81.6 |
| Republican | Eddie McCain | 9,842 | 18.4 |
| Total votes | | 53,529 | 100.0 |

==== Candidates ====
===== Nominee =====
- Phil Black

===== Eliminated in primary =====
- Ed Greenleaf

==== Results ====
Democratic primary results
| Party | Candidate | Votes | % |
|---|---|---|---|
| Democratic | Phil Black | 6,699 | 54.2 |
| Democratic | Ed Greenleaf | 5,663 | 45.8 |
| Total votes | | 12,362 | 100.0 |

=== General election ===
Harold Geddings III of the Labor Party also ran.

==== Predictions ====
| Source | Ranking | As of |
|---|---|---|
| The Cook Political Report | Safe R | November 3, 2014 |
| Rothenberg | Safe R | October 24, 2014 |
| Sabato's Crystal Ball | Safe R | October 30, 2014 |
| RCP | Safe R | November 2, 2014 |
| Daily Kos Elections | Safe R | November 4, 2014 |

==== Results ====
South Carolina's 2nd congressional district, 2014
| Party | Candidate | Votes | % |
|---|---|---|---|
| Republican | Joe Wilson (incumbent) | 121,649 | 62.5 |
| Democratic | Phil Black | 68,719 | 35.3 |
| Labor | Harold Geddings III | 4,158 | 2.1 |
| n/a | Write-ins | 282 | 0.1 |
| Total votes | | 194,808 | 100.0 |
| Republican hold | | | |

== District 3 ==
2014 South Carolina's 3rd congressional district election
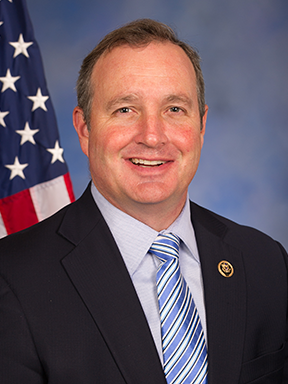

| Nominee | Jeff Duncan | Barbara Jo Mullis |
| Party | Republican | Democratic |
| Popular vote | 116,741 | 47,181 |
| Percentage | 71.2% | 28.8% |
- County results Duncan: 50–60% 60–70% 70–80%
U.S. Representative before election
Jeff Duncan
Republican
Elected U.S. Representative
Jeff Duncan
Republican

The 3rd district is located in western South Carolina. The incumbent was Republican Jeff Duncan, who had represented the district since 2011. He was re-elected with 67% of the vote in 2012, and the district has a PVI of R+18.

=== Republican primary ===
==== Candidates ====
===== Nominee =====
- Jeff Duncan, incumbent U.S. Representative

=== Democratic primary ===
==== Candidates ====
===== Nominee =====
- Barbara Jo Mullis

===== Eliminated in primary =====
- Hosea Cleveland

==== Results ====
Democratic primary results
| Party | Candidate | Votes | % |
|---|---|---|---|
| Democratic | Barbara Jo Mullis | 4,989 | 66.6 |
| Democratic | Hosea Cleveland | 2,501 | 33.4 |
| Total votes | | 7,490 | 100.0 |

=== General election ===
==== Predictions ====
| Source | Ranking | As of |
|---|---|---|
| The Cook Political Report | Safe R | November 3, 2014 |
| Rothenberg | Safe R | October 24, 2014 |
| Sabato's Crystal Ball | Safe R | October 30, 2014 |
| RCP | Safe R | November 2, 2014 |
| Daily Kos Elections | Safe R | November 4, 2014 |

==== Results ====
South Carolina's 3rd congressional district, 2014
| Party | Candidate | Votes | % |
|---|---|---|---|
| Republican | Jeff Duncan (incumbent) | 116,741 | 71.2 |
| Democratic | Barbara Jo Mullis | 47,181 | 28.8 |
| n/a | Write-ins | 87 | 0.0 |
| Total votes | | 164,009 | 100.0 |
| Republican hold | | | |

== District 4 ==
2014 South Carolina's 4th congressional district election
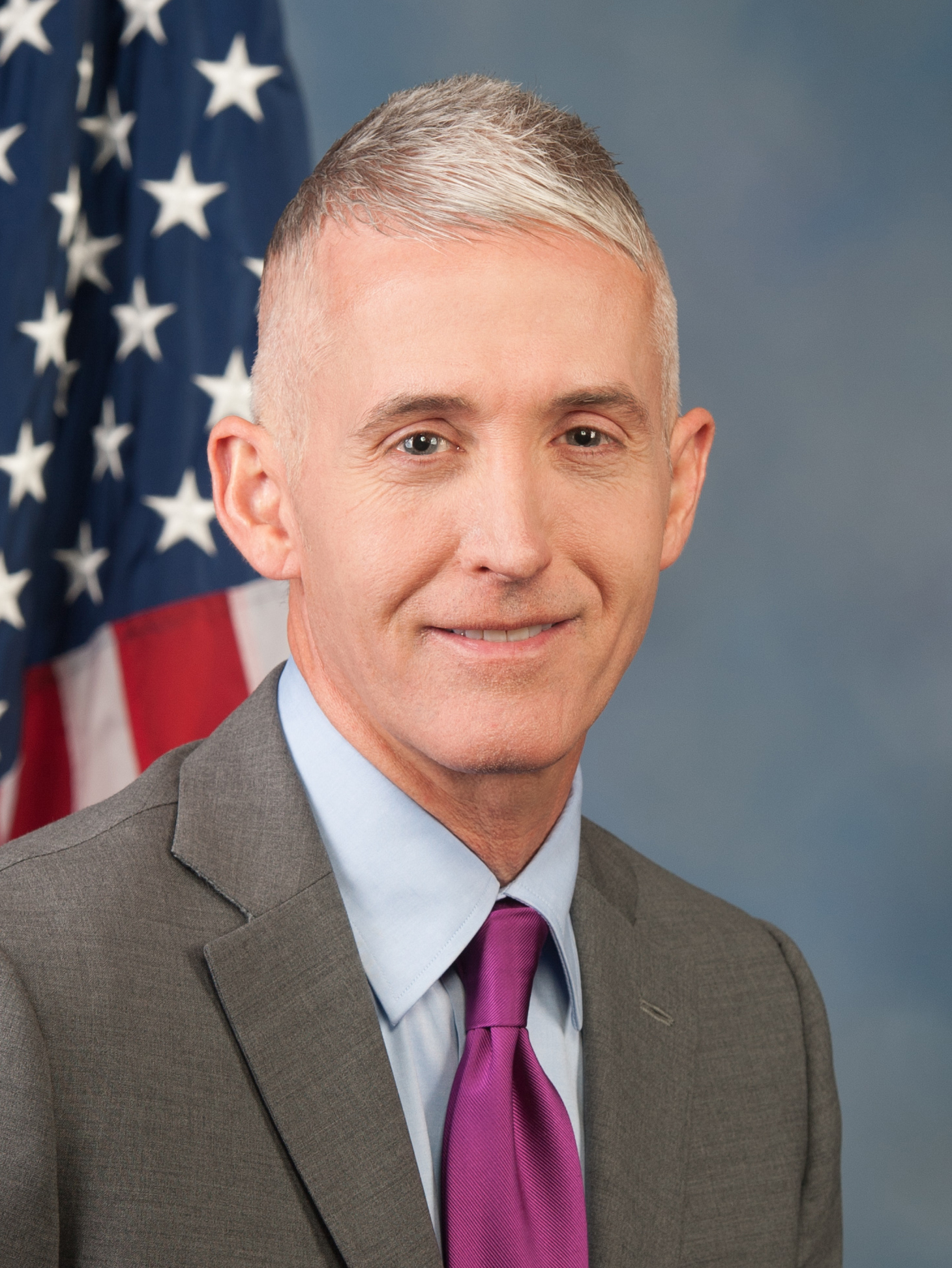

| Nominee | Trey Gowdy | Curtis E. McLaughlin, Jr. |
| Party | Republican | Libertarian |
| Popular vote | 126,452 | 21,969 |
| Percentage | 84.8% | 14.8% |
- County results Gowdy: 80–90%
U.S. Representative before election
Trey Gowdy
Republican
Elected U.S. Representative
Trey Gowdy
Republican

The 4th district is located in Upstate South Carolina. The incumbent was Republican Trey Gowdy, who had represented the district since 2011. He was re-elected with 65% of the vote in 2012, and the district has a PVI of R+15.

=== Republican primary ===
==== Candidates ====
===== Nominee =====
- Trey Gowdy, incumbent U.S. Representative

=== Democratic primary ===
==== Candidates ====
No Democrats filed.

=== Libertarian primary ===
==== Candidates ====
===== Nominee =====
- Curtis E. McLaughlin

=== General election ===
==== Predictions ====
| Source | Ranking | As of |
|---|---|---|
| The Cook Political Report | Safe R | November 3, 2014 |
| Rothenberg | Safe R | October 24, 2014 |
| Sabato's Crystal Ball | Safe R | October 30, 2014 |
| RCP | Safe R | November 2, 2014 |
| Daily Kos Elections | Safe R | November 4, 2014 |

==== Results ====
South Carolina's 4th congressional district, 2014
| Party | Candidate | Votes | % |
|---|---|---|---|
| Republican | Trey Gowdy (incumbent) | 126,452 | 84.8 |
| Libertarian | Curtis E. McLaughlin, Jr. | 21,969 | 14.8 |
| n/a | Write-ins | 628 | 0.4 |
| Total votes | | 149,049 | 100.0 |
| Republican hold | | | |

== District 5 ==
2014 South Carolina's 5th congressional district election
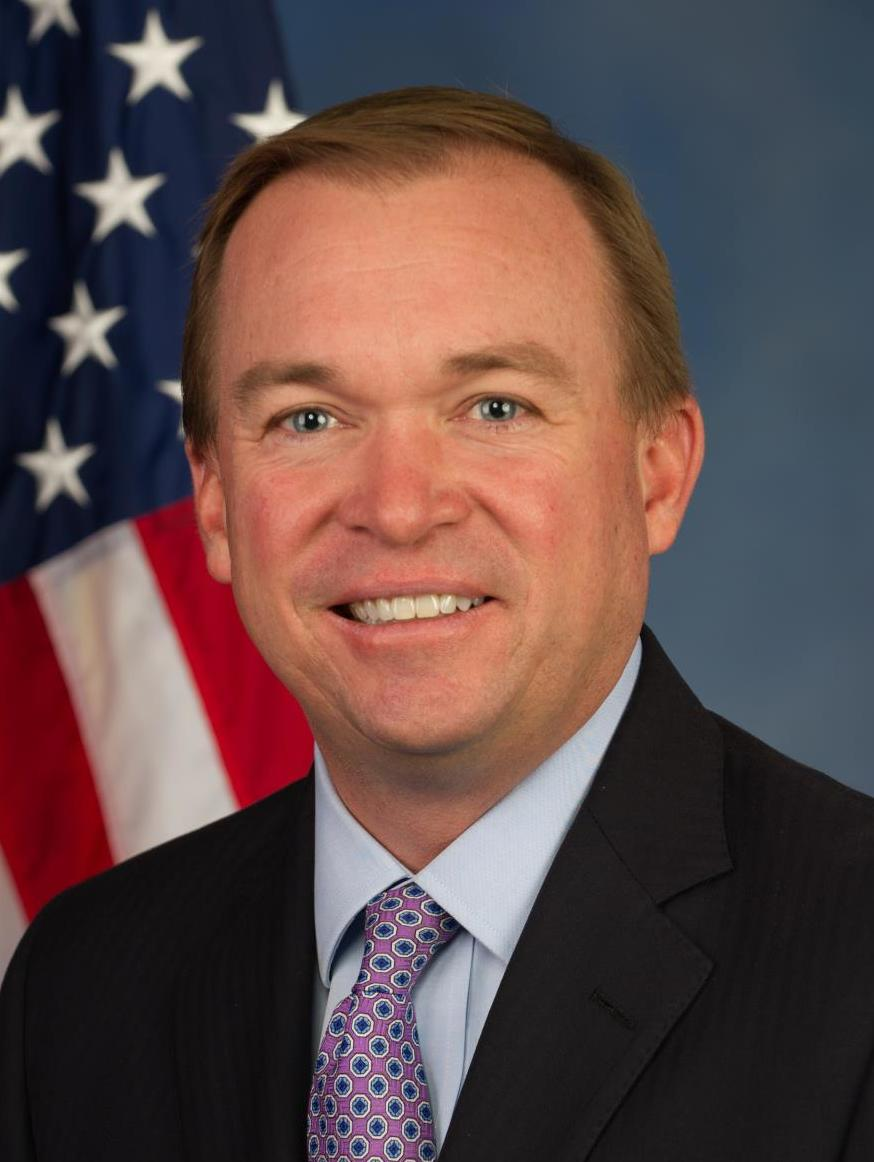

| Nominee | Mick Mulvaney | Tom Adams |
| Party | Republican | Democratic |
| Popular vote | 103,078 | 71,985 |
| Percentage | 58.9% | 41.1% |
- County results Mulvaney: 50–60% 60–70% 70–80% Adams: 60–70%
U.S. Representative before election
Mick Mulvaney
Republican
Elected U.S. Representative
Mick Mulvaney
Republican

The 5th district is located in northern South Carolina. The incumbent was Republican Mick Mulvaney, who had represented the district since 2011. He was re-elected with 56% of the vote in 2012, and the district has a PVI of R+9.

=== Republican primary ===
==== Candidates ====
===== Nominee =====
- Mick Mulvaney, incumbent U.S. Representative

=== Democratic primary ===
==== Candidates ====
===== Nominee =====
- Tom Adams, Fort Mill Town Council member

=== General election ===
==== Predictions ====
| Source | Ranking | As of |
|---|---|---|
| The Cook Political Report | Safe R | November 3, 2014 |
| Rothenberg | Safe R | October 24, 2014 |
| Sabato's Crystal Ball | Safe R | October 30, 2014 |
| RCP | Safe R | November 2, 2014 |
| Daily Kos Elections | Safe R | November 4, 2014 |

==== Results ====
South Carolina's 5th congressional district, 2014
| Party | Candidate | Votes | % |
|---|---|---|---|
| Republican | Mick Mulvaney (incumbent) | 103,078 | 58.9 |
| Democratic | Tom Adams | 71,985 | 41.1 |
| n/a | Write-ins | 82 | 0.0 |
| Total votes | | 175,145 | 100.0 |
| Republican hold | | | |

== District 6 ==
2014 South Carolina's 6th congressional district election
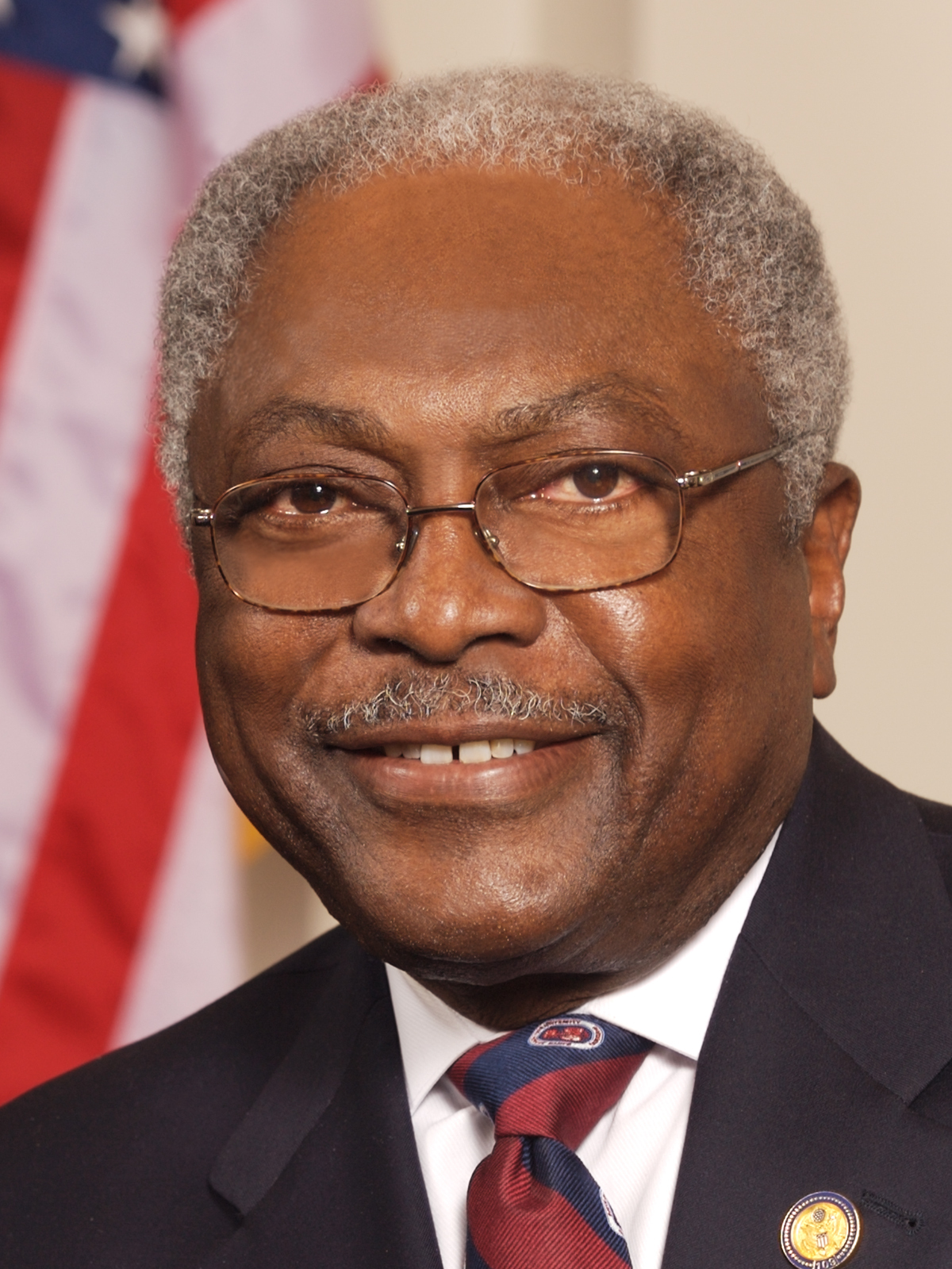

| Nominee | Jim Clyburn | Anthony Culler |
| Party | Democratic | Republican |
| Popular vote | 125,747 | 44,311 |
| Percentage | 72.5% | 25.6% |
- County results Clyburn: 50–60% 60–70% 70–80% 80–90%
U.S. Representative before election
Jim Clyburn
Democratic
Elected U.S. Representative
Jim Clyburn
Democratic

The 6th district is located in central and southwestern South Carolina. The incumbent was Democrat Jim Clyburn, who had represented the district since 1993. He was re-elected with 94% of the vote in 2012, and the district has a PVI of D+21.

=== Democratic primary ===
==== Candidates ====
===== Nominee =====
- Jim Clyburn, incumbent U.S. Representative

===== Eliminated in primary =====
- Karen Smith

==== Results ====
Democratic primary results
| Party | Candidate | Votes | % |
|---|---|---|---|
| Democratic | Jim Clyburn (incumbent) | 37,429 | 86.0 |
| Democratic | Karen Smith | 6,101 | 14.0 |
| Total votes | | 43,530 | 100.0 |

=== Republican primary ===
==== Candidates ====
===== Nominee =====
- Anthony Culler

===== Eliminated in primary =====
- Leon Winn

==== Results ====
Republican primary results
| Party | Candidate | Votes | % |
|---|---|---|---|
| Republican | Anthony Culler | 10,377 | 66.5 |
| Republican | Leon Winn | 5,231 | 33.5 |
| Total votes | | 15,608 | 100.0 |

=== Libertarian primary ===
==== Candidates ====
===== Nominee =====
- Kevin R. Umbaugh

=== General election ===
==== Predictions ====
| Source | Ranking | As of |
|---|---|---|
| The Cook Political Report | Safe D | November 3, 2014 |
| Rothenberg | Safe D | October 24, 2014 |
| Sabato's Crystal Ball | Safe D | October 30, 2014 |
| RCP | Safe D | November 2, 2014 |
| Daily Kos Elections | Safe D | November 4, 2014 |

==== Results ====
South Carolina's 6th congressional district, 2014
| Party | Candidate | Votes | % |
|---|---|---|---|
| Democratic | Jim Clyburn (incumbent) | 125,747 | 72.5 |
| Republican | Anthony Culler | 44,311 | 25.6 |
| Libertarian | Kevin Umbaugh | 3,176 | 1.8 |
| n/a | Write-ins | 198 | 0.1 |
| Total votes | | 173,432 | 100.0 |
| Democratic hold | | | |

== District 7 ==
2014 South Carolina's 7th congressional district election
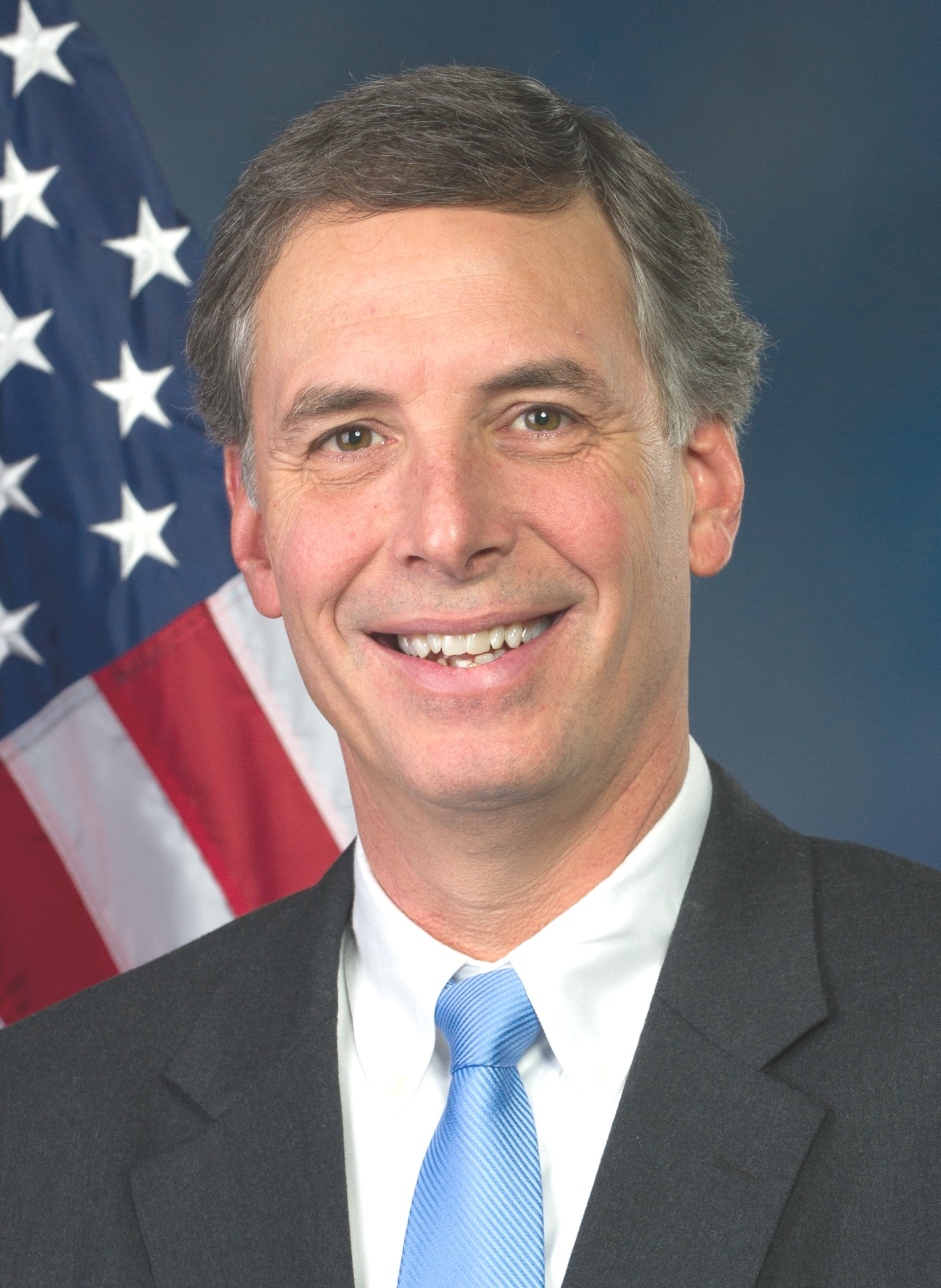

| Nominee | Tom Rice | Gloria Bromell Tinubu |
| Party | Republican | Democratic |
| Popular vote | 102,833 | 68,576 |
| Percentage | 59.9% | 40.0% |
- County results Rice: 50–60% 70–80% Bromell-tinubu: 50–60% 60–70%
U.S. Representative before election
Tom Rice
Republican
Elected U.S. Representative
Tom Rice
Republican

The 7th district is located in northeastern South Carolina. The incumbent was Republican Tom Rice, who had represented this newly created district since 2013. He was elected with 56% of the vote in 2012, and the district has a PVI of R+7.

=== Republican primary ===
==== Candidates ====
===== Nominee =====
- Tom Rice, incumbent U.S. Representative

=== Democratic primary ===
==== Candidates ====
===== Nominee =====
- Gloria Bromell Tinubu, professor at Coastal Carolina University, former Georgia state representative and nominee for this seat in 2012

=== General election ===
==== Predictions ====
| Source | Ranking | As of |
|---|---|---|
| The Cook Political Report | Safe R | November 3, 2014 |
| Rothenberg | Safe R | October 24, 2014 |
| Sabato's Crystal Ball | Safe R | October 30, 2014 |
| RCP | Safe R | November 2, 2014 |
| Daily Kos Elections | Safe R | November 4, 2014 |

==== Results ====
South Carolina's 7th congressional district, 2014
| Party | Candidate | Votes | % |
|---|---|---|---|
| Republican | Tom Rice (Incumbent) | 102,833 | 59.9 |
| Democratic | Gloria Bromell Tinubu | 68,576 | 40.0 |
| n/a | Write-ins | 115 | 0.1 |
| Total votes | | 171,524 | 100.0 |
| Republican hold | | | |

== See also ==
- 2014 United States House of Representatives elections
- 2014 United States elections
