= Andy Patrick =

American politician

Member of the South Carolina House of Representatives from the 123 district
- In office November 2010 – November 2014
- Preceded by: Richard Chalk
- Succeeded by: Jeff Bradley

Personal details
- Party: Republican

Andy Patrick (born August 5, 1969) is an American politician from the state of South Carolina. A member of the Republican Party, Patrick was a member of the South Carolina House of Representatives, representing the 123rd district.

== Early years ==
Patrick experienced childhood in Perry, New York City. He moved on from Perry County High School in 1987. Patrick graduated from the State University of New York Brockport with a Bachelor of Science in Criminal Justice in 1995.

== Career ==
Patrick was an active duty member of the US Air Force, former New York State Trooper and special agent in the United States Secret Service. He moved from Virginia to South Carolina in 2004, where he headed a risk management consulting firm. In 2010, Patrick was elected to the South Carolina House of Representatives in District 123, defeating incumbent Richard Chalk. He evoked a support from the Conservation Voters of South Carolina, who stated that Patrick comprehends the estimation of South Carolina's points of interest of Conservation Bank. Patrick won toward the South Carolina House of Representatives in 2012.

Patrick ran for the United States House of Representatives in the 2013 special election to represent South Carolina's 1st congressional district.

== Personal ==
Patrick lives in Hilton Head Island, South Carolina with his wife and five children.

== See also ==
- South Carolina State Legislature
- South Carolina House of Representatives
- South Carolina House of Representatives Committees
- South Carolina Joint Committees
- South Carolina state legislative districts
- South Carolina down ballot state executive elections, 2014
- South Carolina Superintendent of Education

== Footnotes ==
- Jump up↑ WISTV, "Rep. Patrick running for state superintendent," January 22, 2014
- ↑ Jump up to:2.0 2.1 The Post and Courier, "Rep. Patrick ends his race for S.C. education superintendent," January 28, 2014
- ↑ Jump up to:3.0 3.1 3.2 SC Votes, "March 19 Special Primary Election" accessed March 19, 2013
- Jump up↑ Washington Post, "Scott's departure for Senate will trigger third special House election in 2013," December 17, 2012
- Jump up↑ South Carolina Republican Party Website, "1st Congressional Special Election details set," accessed January 3, 2013
- Jump up↑ Roll Call, "Sanford Likely Front-Runner in S.C. Special Election," January 3, 2013
- Jump up↑ Salon.com, "Ted Turner’s son vying in SC congressional primary," January 23, 2013
- Jump up↑ Biographical Directory of the United States Congress, "Davis, Medel Jackson, (1942-2007)," accessed January 28, 2013
- Jump up↑ AP.org, "South Carolina State Senate and State House Election Results," accessed November 7, 2012
- Jump up↑ South Carolina State Election Commission, "2012 Candidates," accessed April 25, 2012
- Jump up↑ www.enr-scvotes.org, "2010 General Election Results," accessed May 1, 2014
- Jump up↑ The finance data shown here comes from the disclosures required of candidates and parties, likely representing only a portion of all the funds spent on their behalf. See this page for more details.
- Jump up↑ Race 4 2012 "Perry Unveils Endorsements From 21 SC State Legislators," September 21, 2011
- Jump up↑ Rick Santorum for President, "SENATOR SANTORUM ANNOUNCES ADDITIONAL SOUTH CAROLINA ENDORSEMENTS - THIS TIME IN BLUFFTON AND HILTON HEAD," October 14, 2011
- Jump up↑ The State, "Haley tells court she has right to call special session," 6 June 2011
- Jump up↑ Wltx.com, "SC Supreme Court Rules Against Nikki Haley's Extra Session," June 6, 2011
- Jump up↑ TheSunNews.com, "S.C. House to have special session in June," 6 May 2011
- Jump up↑ The Island Packet, "S.C. Senate OKs new congressional districted anchored in Beaufort County," June 29, 2011
- [1]Jump up↑ The Palmetto Liberty Political Action Committee, "Voting Records," accessed April 11, 2014
- [2][1]Jump up↑ Palmetto Liberty Political Action Committee, "South Carolina Senate Score Card 2012," accessed April 11, 2014
- [1][3][2][2]Jump up↑ Palmetto Liberty Political Action Committee, "South Carolina Senate Score Card 2012," accessed May 15, 2014
