= Ben Frasier =

American political activist (born 1942)

Benjamin Frasier Jr. (born c. 1942) is a perennial candidate for political office in South Carolina, having run for Congress over fifteen times since 1972. He became the Democratic Party nominee for the November 2010 election, "surpris[ing] observers" by beating retired Air Force Reserve Colonel Robert Burton in South Carolina's 1st congressional district Democratic Party primary, with 56 percent of the vote to Burton's 44 percent.

== Political career ==
Frasier was an aide to Congressman L. Mendel Rivers, who died in office in December 1970.

An incomplete list of Frasier's political campaigns include:

- 1972: Applied to run as a Democrat for South Carolina's 1st congressional district for the first time, against incumbent Mendel Jackson Davis, who had succeeded Rivers after winning a special election in April 1971. In the primary election, Frasier did no campaigning, and lost the primary to Davis. Frasier claimed he had been "kidnapped" by the "Davis machine" shortly before the primary, but later admitted the story was a hoax.
- 1974: Ran in general election against Davis, as a candidate for the United Citizens Party, and lost, getting 0.6% of the vote.
- 1976: Applied to be a Democratic primary candidate against Davis again, but was excluded for failure to pay the filing fee on time.
- 1978: Davis defeated Frasier in Democratic primary.
- 1980: Davis decided not to run for another term, and Frasier again sought the Democratic nomination to the 1st District. He lost the primary to Charles D. Ravenel, and placed fourth with 6.8% of the vote.
- 1982: Easily defeated in Democratic primary by W. Mullins McLeod.
- 1984: Did not run for office.
- 1986: Lost Democratic primary for 1st district seat, coming in third place with 10% of the vote.
- 1994: Lost Democratic primary election to incumbent Jim Clyburn in 6th district. Clyburn got 86% of the vote.
- 1996: Again lost Democratic primary election to incumbent Jim Clyburn in 6th district.
- 2002: Again lost Democratic primary election to incumbent Jim Clyburn in 6th district.
- 2004: Lost Democratic primary election for U.S. Senate seat to Inez Tenenbaum.
- 2006: Led Democratic primary field for the 1st congressional district seat with 47% of the vote, but lost in the subsequent primary runoff election to Randy Maatta.
- 2008: Lost Democratic primary for South Carolina's 1st congressional district to Linda Ketner
- 2010: Won first-ever nomination, defeating retired Air Force Reserve Colonel Robert Burton in the Democratic 1st congressional district primary, but was defeated by Republican nominee Tim Scott in the general election.
- 2013: Lost Democratic primary for South Carolina's 1st congressional district special election, 2013, necessitated by Scott's appointment to the U.S. Senate, to Elizabeth Colbert Busch, obtaining only 4.1% of the vote (to 95.86% for the winner). Shortly thereafter, Mr. Frasier endorsed Mark Sanford, the Republican candidate in the race.

== Political positions ==
In a 2008 election contest against Linda Ketner, Frasier said education and energy are his highest priorities. He supported expanded use of nuclear energy, ethanol and offshore drilling. He said the Federal Government could spend more on education, "but most of the responsibility is the state's." He lost to Ketner in the Democratic primary.

Frasier appears to hold many views more common to Republicans than Democrats. In his 2004 Senate campaign, his advertising stated that his positions included: pro-life except if mother's life was in danger, "pro keeping God in the Pledge," for prayer in public schools, and supported "the Right for Citizens to Own Guns NRA-Member."

== Election disputes ==
During the 2008 election his eligibility for office was questioned as he was accused of being a resident of Maryland. The Charleston County Board of Elections upheld his legitimacy in a unanimous decision.

His frequent candidacies have been criticized as having "forced more serious and more electable candidates to face him in primaries" and for having "forced the party to pay for those primaries, yet he has never campaigned seriously, let alone been victorious in one of those primaries," a statement which was true at the time it was made.

In 2010, James Clyburn accused Frasier and South Carolina U.S Senate candidate Alvin Greene of being Republican plants. The group Citizens for Responsibility and Ethics in Washington (CREW) filed a complaint with the Federal Election Commission (FEC) alleging that primary-winner Frasier, Greene, and two other candidates in the June 8, 2010 Democratic primary in South Carolina (Gregory Brown and Brian Doyle) violated the Federal Election Campaign Act (FECA) and FEC regulations by failing to file mandatory disclosure reports prior to the 2010 South Carolina primary election.
