= Elizabeth Colbert Busch =

American economist and politician (born 1954)

- Born: Elizabeth Colbert; December 10, 1954 (age 71); St. Louis, Missouri, U.S.
- Education: College of Charleston (BA)
- Political party: Democratic
- Spouses: Robert Legare (div.); Claus Wyman Busch III
- Children: 3
- Father: James William Colbert Jr.
- Relatives: Stephen Colbert (brother)

Elizabeth Colbert Busch (born December 10, 1954) is an American economist and politician who is the Director of Business Development at Clemson University's Restoration Institute, and was the Democratic Party nominee for the 2013 special election for South Carolina's 1st congressional district, losing to Mark Sanford. She is the sister of comedian Stephen Colbert.

== Early life and education ==
Born in St. Louis, Missouri, Colbert Busch is the eighth of the eleven children of James William Colbert Jr., who served as the first Vice President of Academic Affairs at the Medical University of South Carolina, and homemaker Lorna (née Tuck) Colbert.

The Colbert family is 15/16ths Irish ancestry; one of her paternal great-great-grandmothers was of German and English descent. Many of her ancestors emigrated from Ireland to North America in the 19th century before and during the Great Famine.

Colbert Busch briefly attended the University of South Carolina, but returned to Charleston after her father and two brothers Peter and Paul were among the 71 passengers who died on Eastern Air Lines Flight 212, in 1974. She then enrolled in the College of Charleston, receiving her B.A. in intermodal transportation and logistics management, and was named to the National Dean's List in 1988.

== Career ==
After graduating, she completed a South Carolina State Ports Authority business development internship, and worked for Associated Maritime Industries Inc, as a liaison between the AMI and the U.S. Federal and State Governments. She then worked as the Regional Director for Sales and Marketing and the Director of Business Development at Orient Overseas Container Line (OOCL), where she was responsible for international maritime relations and South Atlantic and North American sales. She left OOCL in 2008, when she was hired as Director of Business Development at Clemson University's Restoration Institute, described by the Charleston Post and Courier as "the school's corporate matchmaker" for the university's development projects for wind turbine testing, water studies, and renewable energy. Colbert Busch also works as the Director of Sales and Marketing for Clemson's Wind Turbine Drivetrain Testing Facility.

Colbert Busch is a founder and former member of the Executive Board of Directors of Charleston Women in International Trade, and former member of the College of Charleston's Business College Alumni Advisory Board. She has served as chairwoman of the 2006 S.C. International Trade Conference, the chairwoman of the Maritime Association Port of Charleston and is board member of the Charleston Metro Chamber of Commerce.

== 2013 congressional campaign ==
On January 18, 2013, Colbert Busch announced that she would run as a Democrat in the 2013 special election for South Carolina's 1st congressional district to fill the vacancy created when Tim Scott was appointed to the United States Senate after incumbent Senator Jim DeMint resigned to head conservative think tank The Heritage Foundation. In the March 19 Democratic primary, she was to face Charleston businessman Martin Skelly, the founder of the Russian-based private equity firm UFG Asset Management.

On February 11, 2013, Martin Skelly dropped out of the race, endorsing Colbert Busch.

On March 19, 2013, Colbert Busch handily won the Democratic primary with over 95% of the vote compared to perennial candidate Ben Frasier's 4%. In the special election she was defeated by former South Carolina Governor Mark Sanford. Colbert Busch garnered 45.3% of the vote compared to Sanford's 54.2%.

Colbert Busch supported background checks as part of a gun control bill that was defeated by the U.S. Senate.

== Personal life ==
Elizabeth Colbert Busch is married to Claus Wyman Busch III. She has three children with her ex-husband Robert Legare: Mary Legare Middleton (grandchildren Elizabeth Ann and Thomas Bradley Middleton Jr.); Robert Walker Legare Jr; and Catherine Ann Legare.

She was arrested in 1988 for contempt of court during her divorce from her previous husband.
