= Western Airlines Flight 2605 =

1979 aviation accident in Mexico

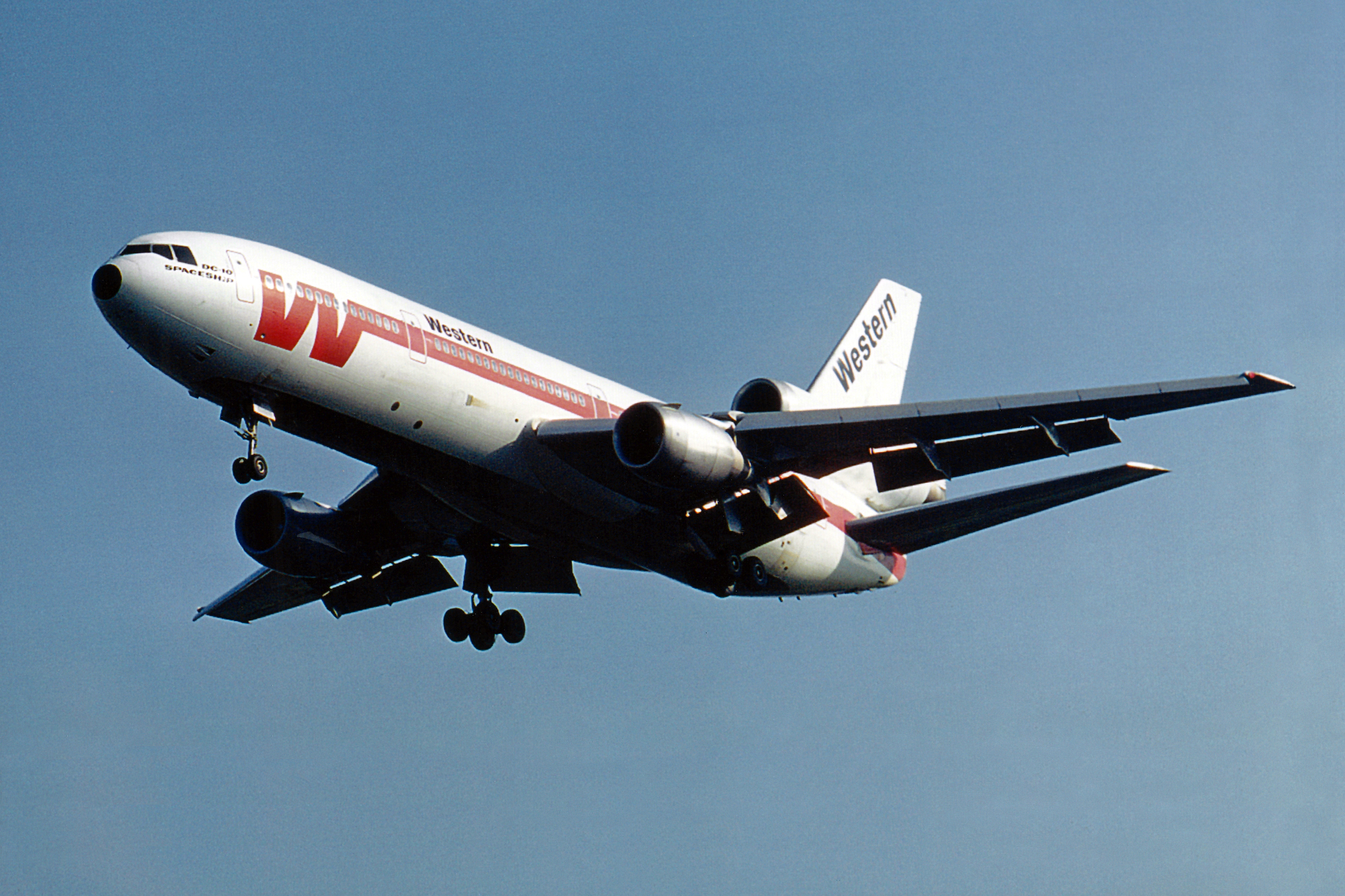
- N903WA, the aircraft involved in the accident, seen in 1976

Accident
- Date: October 31, 1979
- Summary: Runway incursion while landing on a closed runway due to pilot error and low visibility
- Site: Mexico City Int'l Airport, Mexico City, Mexico; 19°26′11″N 99°04′20″W
- Total fatalities: 73

Aircraft
- Aircraft type: McDonnell Douglas DC-10-10
- Aircraft name: Night Owl
- Operator: Western Airlines
- IATA flight No.: WA2605
- ICAO flight No.: WAL2605
- Call sign: WESTERN 2605
- Registration: N903WA
- Flight origin: Los Angeles International Airport; Los Angeles, California, United States
- Destination: Mexico City International Airport; Mexico City, Mexico
- Occupants: 88
- Passengers: 75
- Crew: 13
- Fatalities: 72
- Injuries: 16
- Survivors: 16

Ground casualties
- Ground fatalities: 1

Western Airlines Flight 2605, nicknamed the "Night Owl", was an international scheduled passenger flight from Los Angeles, California, to Mexico City, Mexico. On October 31, 1979, at 5:42 a.m. CST (UTC−06:00), the McDonnell Douglas DC-10 crashed at Mexico City International Airport in fog after landing on a runway that was closed for maintenance. Of the 88 occupants on board, 72 were killed, in addition to a maintenance worker who died when the plane struck his vehicle.

Flight 2605 is Mexico City's deadliest aviation accident and the third-deadliest on Mexican soil after the crashes of two Boeing 727s: the 1969 crash of Mexicana de Aviación Flight 704 and that of Mexicana de Aviación Flight 940 in 1986. The crash was one of three fatal DC-10 accidents in 1979, following the May crash of American Airlines Flight 191 at Chicago's O'Hare International Airport and preceding the November crash of Air New Zealand Flight 901 into Antarctica's Mount Erebus.

== Background ==
=== Aircraft ===
The aircraft involved was a wide-body McDonnell Douglas DC-10-10, registered as N903WA. The aircraft first flew in 1973 and in six years had logged a total of 24,614 flight hours.

=== Crew ===
On the accident flight, the aircraft carried 75 passengers and 13 crew including captain Charles Gilbert (53), first officer Ernst Reichel (44) and flight engineer Daniel Walsh (39).

== Accident ==
Mexico City International Airport has two runways, Runway 23 Left (23L), and Runway 23 Right (23R). At the time of the accident, Runway 23L had full instrument approach equipment, including an instrument landing system (ILS), while Runway 23R did not. On October 19, 1979, a notice to airmen was issued stating that Runway 23L would be closed until further notice for resurfacing work.

On October 31, 1979, the flight departed Los Angeles International Airport at 1:40 a.m. PST (UTC−08:00), and was scheduled to land well before sunrise in Mexico City. The sky was quite dark, as twilight had only started five minutes before the crash, and ground fog obscured the runway.

As Flight 2605 approached Mexico City International Airport, air-traffic controllers cleared it for an instrument approach using the ILS of Runway 23L, with an expected landing runway of 23R. With Runway 23L closed for maintenance, the controllers expected Flight 2605 to perform a sidestep maneuver to the open runway, 23R. To accomplish this, the crew would follow the ILS glide path toward Runway 23L, and as soon as they sighted the runway, they would reorient the aircraft to land on 23R. During the approach, the crew was advised four times by approach control or the tower that the intended landing runway was 23R. However, the controllers did not use any phrases indicative of a sidestep maneuver that would have been familiar to American pilots. There was no published visual representation of the sidestep approach available to the pilots, and the airport's approach chart for 23R showed only ceiling and visibility minimums. Both pilots knew that 23L was closed, as they had previously landed on 23R without incident while 23L was out of service.

Weather conditions were deteriorating during Flight 2605's instrument approach. A 5:00 a.m. weather report indicated visibility of 2 to 3 nautical miles (2.3 to 3.5 mi; 3,700 to 5,600 m) depending on direction. By 6:00 a.m. (shortly after the accident), visibility was described as "zero". Flight 2605 was on short final to the closed runway at 5:42 a.m. The cockpit voice recording of the last seconds of the flight indicates that the first officer and captain agreed that they were cleared for 23R, though they were still on approach to 23L. The captain realized this, saying "No, this is the approach to the god-damned left". With the aircraft at a speed of 130 knots (150 mph; 240 km/h), the main landing gear touched the ground, with the left gear on the grass left of Runway 23L and the right gear on the runway shoulder, producing a force greater than 2 g_{0}. One second later, the crew tried to abort the landing and applied go-around power. The first officer began to describe the ILS approach's missed-approach procedure, a climb to 8,500 feet (2,600 m), in a "nonurgent, perfunctory manner" as the DC-10 once again became airborne. Approximately three seconds after the touchdown and in a 10-11-degree nose-up attitude, the right main gear collided with a dump truck loaded with 10 tons of earth. Most of the right main gear separated from the aircraft and struck the right horizontal stabilizer. The impact of the landing gear shattered the truck, killing its driver, and created a 1,300-by-330-foot (400 by 100 m) debris field.

The damaged aircraft, still airborne with takeoff thrust engaged, began to roll to the right. The bank angle increased until the right wing flap struck the cab of an excavator 4,921 feet (1,500 m) from the runway threshold. Panic ensued in the cockpit, and Gilbert was heard screaming while Reichel urged him to "get it up". The bank angle continued to increase to the point that the right wing began to cut into the ground and taxiways next to the closed runway. The end of the right wing eventually struck the corner of an aircraft-repair hangar, causing damage to the hangar and also fracturing the DC-10's right wing. The plane then impacted an Eastern Air Lines service building north of both runways, 26 seconds after it had initially touched the ground. This final impact caused the structural breakup of the aircraft, heavily damaged the two-story reinforced concrete building and caused a fire that consumed most of the aircraft structure. Part of the DC-10's left wing traveled well off airport grounds, impacting a residential building on Matamoros Street in the Peñón de los Baños colonia, starting a major fire in that area as well.

Most survivors were found in a 20-foot-long (6 m) section of fuselage that did not burn. Survivors reported that large pieces of the building continued to fall onto the wreckage of the aircraft several minutes after the crash as rescuers arrived on the scene.

=== Aircraft ===
On the day of the accident, the status of the persons on board Flight 2605 was reported as:

- 63 bodies recovered
- 8 missing and assumed dead
- 3 passengers in intensive care at American British Cowdray Hospital
- 9 passengers in satisfactory condition at American British Cowdray Hospital
- 5 passengers already released from other hospitals after first-aid treatment

One more passenger died of his injuries at American British Cowdray Hospital on November 18, bringing the total fatality count of passengers and crew to 72. Of the 17 surviving passengers, 15 were injured.

As of November 6, three bodies had not been identified or claimed, and the coroner's office created face models to assist in identification. The rest were identified by nationality.

Nationality	On board fatalities
Japan	1
Mexico	37
Nicaragua	1
United Kingdom	2
United States	28
Spain	3
Total	72

=== Ground ===
Differing totals of ground injuries and fatalities were reported. Ground fatalities were reported as being just one (the driver of the truck parked on Runway 23L) to as many as three (the driver and two people in the Eastern Airlines building). As many as 30 people were injured, including those on the ground injured by flying debris.

=== Airport closure ===
Mexico City International Airport was forced to close to flights temporarily, and 2,000 people were reported to have traveled to the airport to view the crash site and wreckage on Friday, November 2.

== Investigation ==
As Flight 2605 crashed on Mexican soil, the accident investigation was performed by the Directorate General of Civil Aeronautics (DGCA). Details of its findings were republished in International Civil Aviation Organization (ICAO) circular 173-AN/109. The probable cause of the accident was determined as: "Non-compliance with the meteorological minima for the approach procedure, as cleared; failure to comply with the aircraft's operating procedures during the approach phase, and landing on a runway closed to traffic."

A further investigation was executed by the Air Line Pilots Association, and its results were summarized in the December 1983 issue of Flying magazine. While the ALPA report conceded that the pilots had landed on the wrong runway in the face of published minimums, it criticized the Mexican accident report as being of "inadequate depth and detail" and containing "significant errors".

=== Sidestep approach ===
A primary point of disagreement between the official ICAO report and the ALPA study was the wording and description of the failed sidestep approach to Runway 23R. The official report reads:

"As shown by the flight recorder trace, the aircraft stayed on the correct flight path to Runway 23 Right for most of the time between the outer marker "Metro Eco" and Mexico City International Airport, and only deviated to the runway closed to traffic (23 Left) when at a height of (600 feet) above the ground during its final approach."

The decision height at which the sidestep approach required Runway 23R to be in sight (and to perform the sidestep maneuver) was 600 feet AGL. In continuing toward 23L below that height, by definition the crew was deviating from their cleared approach. The ALPA study surmised that the crew was confused as to what was required for the sidestep approach. Further, it indicated that landing on the closed 23L required only that the crew continue their current flight path, which was a straight-in ILS approach to 23L.

== Safety recommendations ==
The accident and subsequent investigation prompted the release of NTSB Safety Recommendations A-80-59 and A-80-60. The recommendations required explicit published runway-approach procedures for airport approaches involving sidesteps and distribution of documentation of sidestep-approach procedures in general.

== See also ==
- Singapore Airlines Flight 006, which also crashed on a runway closed for construction because of confusion between runways during takeoff roll in 2000, exactly 21 years later.
- Aeroflot Flight 3352, a Tupolev Tu-154, struck vehicles on the runway while landing in 1984.
- Comair Flight 5191 mistakenly attempted takeoff from the wrong runway in 2006, killing all aboard except one pilot.
- China Airlines Flight 204, a wrong-runway takeoff.
- Emirates SkyCargo Flight 9788, collided with a ground vehicle on landing in 2025.
