= 1996 United States House of Representatives elections in South Carolina =

- November 5, 1996

All 6 South Carolina seats to the United States House of Representatives
	Majority party	Minority party
Party	Republican	Democratic
Last election	4	2
Seats won	4	2
Seat change	Steady	Steady
Popular vote	682,913	345,358
Percentage	64.54%	32.64%
Swing	▲0.91%	▼3.44%

Republican
40–50%
50–60%
60–70%
70–80%
80–90%
>90%
Democratic
50–60%
60–70%
70–80%
Winners
Republican Hold
Democratic Hold

The 1996 United States House of Representatives elections in South Carolina were held on November 5, 1996, to select six Representatives for two-year terms from the state of South Carolina. The primary elections for the Democrats and the Republicans were held on June 11. All six incumbents were re-elected and the composition of the state delegation remained four Republicans and two Democrats.

== 1st congressional district ==
Incumbent Republican Congressman Mark Sanford of the 1st congressional district, in office since 1995, defeated Natural Law candidate Joseph F. Innella.

=== General election results ===
South Carolina's 1st congressional district election results, 1996
Party	Candidate	Votes	%	±%
Republican	Mark Sanford (incumbent)	138,467	96.4	+30.1
Natural Law	Joseph F. Innella	5,105	3.5	+3.5
No party	Write-Ins	121	0.1	+0.1
Majority		133,362	92.9	+59.0
Turnout		143,693		
Republican hold				

== 2nd congressional district ==
Incumbent Republican Congressman Floyd Spence of the 2nd congressional district, in office since 1971, defeated Natural Law candidate Maurice T. Raiford.

=== General election results ===
South Carolina's 2nd congressional district election results, 1996
Party	Candidate	Votes	%	±%
Republican	Floyd Spence (incumbent)	158,229	89.8	−10.0
Natural Law	Maurice T. Raiford	17,713	10.0	+10.0
No party	Write-Ins	347	0.2	0.0
Majority		140,516	79.8	−19.8
Turnout		176,289		
Republican hold				

== 3rd congressional district ==
Incumbent Republican Congressman Lindsey Graham of the 3rd congressional district, in office since 1995, defeated Democratic challenger Debbie Dorn.

=== General election results ===
South Carolina's 3rd congressional district election results, 1996
Party	Candidate	Votes	%	±%
Republican	Lindsey Graham (incumbent)	114,273	60.3	+0.2
Democratic	Debbie Dorn	73,417	38.7	−1.2
Natural Law	Lindal Pennington	1,835	1.0	+1.0
No party	Write-Ins	5	0.0	0.0
Majority		40,856	21.6	+1.4
Turnout		189,530		
Republican hold				

== 4th congressional district ==
Incumbent Republican Congresswoman Bob Inglis of the 4th congressional district, in office since 1993, defeated Democratic challenger Darrell E. Curry.

=== General election results ===
South Carolina's 4th congressional district election results, 1996
Party	Candidate	Votes	%	±%
Republican	Bob Inglis (incumbent)	138,165	70.9	−2.6
Democratic	Darrell E. Curry	54,126	27.8	+1.4
Natural Law	C. Faye Walters	2,501	1.3	+1.3
No party	Write-Ins	20	0.0	−0.1
Majority		84,039	43.1	−4.0
Turnout		194,812		
Republican hold				

== 5th congressional district ==
Incumbent Democratic Congressman John M. Spratt, Jr. of the 5th congressional district, in office since 1983, defeated Republican challenger Larry Bigham.

=== General election results ===
South Carolina's 5th congressional district election results, 1996
Party	Candidate	Votes	%	±%
Democratic	John M. Spratt, Jr. (incumbent)	97,335	54.1	+2.0
Republican	Larry Bigham	81,455	45.3	−2.5
Natural Law	P.G. Joshi	1,159	0.6	+0.6
No party	Write-Ins	22	0.0	−0.1
Majority		15,880	8.8	+4.5
Turnout		179,971		
Democratic hold				

== 6th congressional district ==
Incumbent Democratic Congressman Jim Clyburn of the 6th congressional district, in office since 1993, defeated Republican challenger Gary McLeod.

=== Democratic primary ===
Democratic primary
Candidate	Votes	%
Jim Clyburn	50,933	87.8
Ben Frasier	7,107	12.2

=== Republican primary ===
Republican primary
Candidate	Votes	%
Gary McLeod	12,382	77.8
Delores Porcher-DeCosta	3,530	22.2

=== General election results ===
South Carolina's 6th congressional district election results, 1996
Party	Candidate	Votes	%	±%
Democratic	Jim Clyburn (incumbent)	120,480	69.3	+5.5
Republican	Gary McLeod	52,324	30.1	−6.1
Natural Law	Savitap Joshi	948	0.6	+0.6
No party	Write-Ins	26	0.0	0.0
Majority		68,156	39.2	+11.6
Turnout		173,778		
Democratic hold				

== See also ==
- United States House elections, 1996
- United States Senate election in South Carolina, 1996
- South Carolina's congressional districts
