= China Airlines Flight 204 =

1989 aviation accident

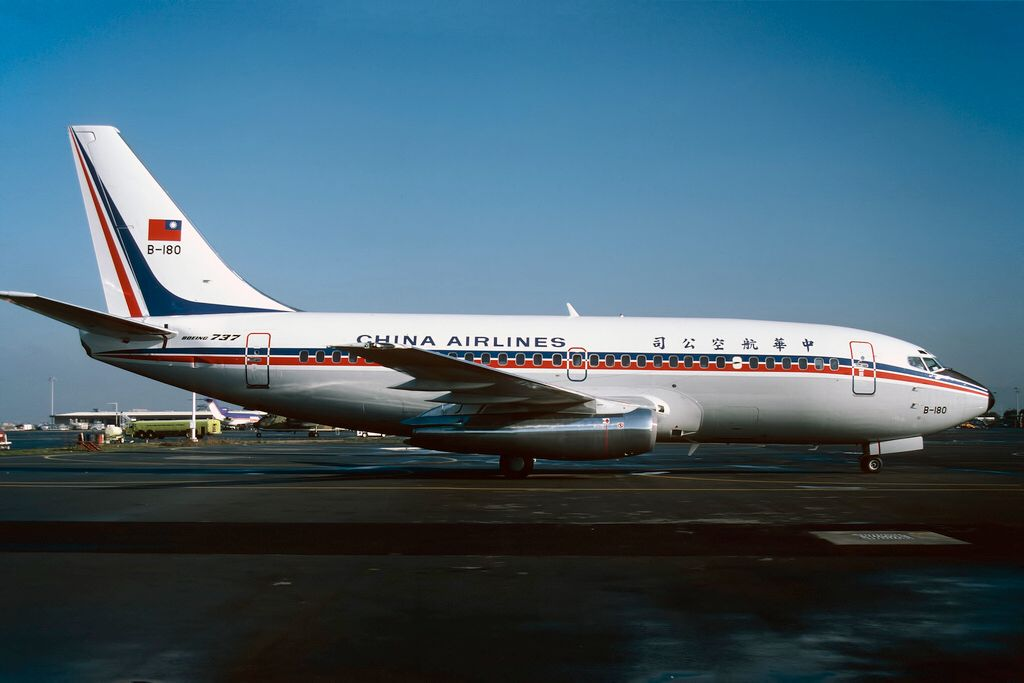
- B-180, the aircraft involved, during delivery flight in 1986

Accident
- Date: 26 October 1989
- Summary: CFIT following takeoff from wrong runway due to pilot and ATC error
- Site: Chiashan mountain range, 5.5 km (3.4 mi) north off Hualien Airport, Taiwan; 24°4′12″N 121°29′28″E

Aircraft
- Aircraft type: Boeing 737-209
- Operator: China Airlines
- IATA flight No.: CI204
- ICAO flight No.: CAL204
- Call sign: DYNASTY 204
- Registration: B-180
- Flight origin: Hualien Airport, Taiwan
- Destination: Taoyuan International Airport, Taiwan
- Occupants: 54
- Passengers: 47
- Crew: 7
- Fatalities: 54
- Survivors: 0

China Airlines Flight 204 (CI204/CAL204) was a Boeing 737-200 that crashed into a mountain after takeoff from Hualien Airport, Taiwan, on 26 October 1989. The crash killed all 54 passengers and crew on board the aircraft.

== Aircraft ==
The aircraft was a Boeing 737-209, MSN 23795, registered as B-180, that was manufactured by Boeing Commercial Airplanes in 1986. It was equipped with two Pratt & Whitney JT8D-9A engines.

== Accident ==
Flight 204 departed Hualien Airport on a short-haul domestic flight to Sungshan Airport on the island of Taiwan with 47 passengers and 7 crew members aboard. Ten minutes after takeoff, the plane collided with a mountain in the Chiashan range at an altitude of approximately 2,100 metres (6,900 ft), 5.5 km (3.4 mi) north of the airport. All 54 passengers and crew members were killed.

== Cause ==
The major cause of the crash was determined to be pilot error, as the experienced pilot (15 years with China Airlines) and a novice copilot departed from the wrong runway, a mistake compounded by ground-control personnel who failed to spot the error. The aircraft then flew the climb-out procedure for the correct runway, and as a result, the aircraft made a left turn toward the mountains rather than a right turn toward the sea.

== See also ==
- Singapore Airlines Flight 006, which also happened in Taiwan
- Comair Flight 5191
- Western Airlines Flight 2605
