= Sterile flight deck rule =

Requirement limiting activity during key flight phases

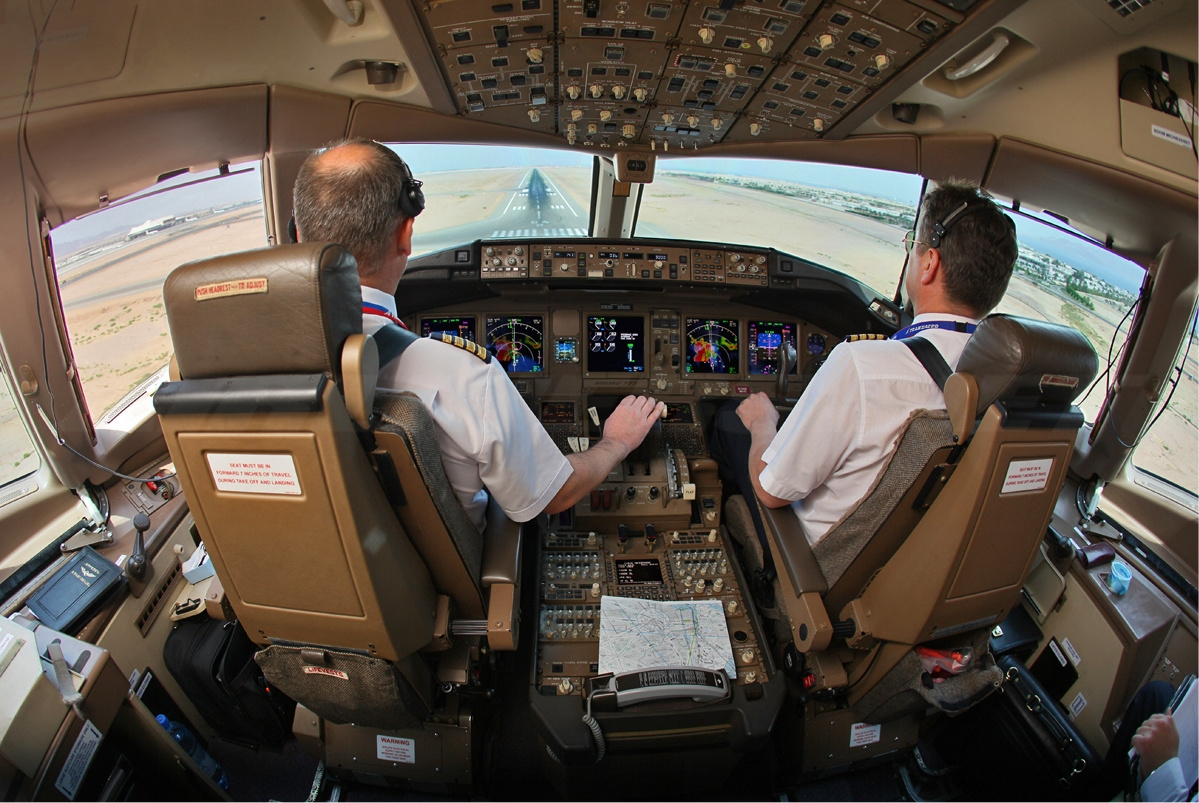
Pilots landing a Boeing 777

In aviation, the sterile flight deck rule or sterile cockpit rule is a procedural requirement that during critical phases of flight (normally below 10,000 ft or 3,000 m), only activities required for the safe operation of the aircraft may be carried out by the flight crew, and all non-essential activities in the cockpit are forbidden. In the United States, the Federal Aviation Administration (FAA) imposed the rule in 1981, after reviewing a series of accidents that were caused by flight crews who were distracted from their flying duties by engaging in non-essential conversations and activities during critical parts of the flight.

One such accident was Eastern Air Lines Flight 212, which crashed several miles short of the runway at Charlotte/Douglas International Airport in 1974 while conducting an instrument approach in dense fog. The National Transportation Safety Board (NTSB) concluded that a probable cause of the accident was lack of altitude awareness due to distraction from idle chatter among the flight crew during the approach phase of the flight. The importance of the rule was further demonstrated by the January 13, 1982 crash of Air Florida Flight 90. The NTSB determined that the probable cause of the crash included the flight crew's failure to enforce a sterile cockpit during the final preflight checklist procedure.

== Historical background ==
In the early days of aviation, pilots had little chance to contemplate non-essential activities. Flying demanded constant attention, and the wind and engine noise in a slipstream-blasted open cockpit all but drowned out normal conversations. In the early years of instrument flying, the effort involved in "flying the beam" (navigating a course determined by the intersection of ground-based radio signals by straining to listen through a headset to a scratchy audio stream of "dits and dahs") also forced pilots to concentrate on flying duties during instrument meteorological conditions.

As aviation technology developed through the postwar period, increased comfort and sound reduction gradually created a more office-like environment in the cockpit, which is more conducive to distractions. Multi-person flight and cabin crews, autopilots, in-flight meals, newspaper service and other comforts further increased the availability and convenience of non-flight-related activities for crews during flight time. The introduction of the Cockpit Voice Recorder as an objective onboard observer played an important role in the assessment of the problem during accident investigation by the NTSB, and eventual implementation of the rules by the FAA.

== Operating requirements ==
=== United States ===
According to the US Federal Aviation Regulations (FAR), the rule is legally applicable only to Part 121 (Scheduled Air Carriers) and Part 135 (Commercial Operators), and not to Part 91 (non-commercial general aviation). It is specified in U.S. FAR 121.542/135.100, "Flight Crewmember Duties":

1. No certificate holder shall require, nor may any flight crewmember perform, any duties during a critical phase of flight except those duties required for the safe operation of the aircraft. Duties such as company required calls made for such nonsafety related purposes as ordering galley supplies and confirming passenger connections, announcements made to passengers promoting the air carrier or pointing out sights of interest, and filling out company payroll and related records are not required for the safe operation of the aircraft.
2. No flight crewmember may engage in, nor may any pilot in command permit, any activity during a critical phase of flight which could distract any flight crewmember from the performance of his or her duties or which could interfere in any way with the proper conduct of those duties. Activities such as eating meals, engaging in nonessential conversations within the cockpit and nonessential communications between the cabin and cockpit crews, and reading publications not related to the proper conduct of the flight are not required for the safe operation of the aircraft.
3. For the purposes of this section, critical phases of flight includes all ground operations involving taxi, takeoff and landing, and all other flight operations conducted below 10,000 feet [3,000 m], except cruise flight.

Note: 'Taxi' is defined as "movement of an airplane under its own power on the surface of an airport".

== Flight attendant and pilot communication ==
Research has shown that flight attendants, who must also observe the sterile flight deck rule, may be reluctant to call the flight deck while the rule is in effect, even during emergencies. For example:

On July 9, 1995, an ATR aft passenger door separated after take-off at an altitude of 600 feet (180 meters) (NTSB, 1995b). The flight attendant at the door stated that she did not think of calling the cockpit when she heard the sound of the door leak before it separated, because the aircraft was under sterile cockpit conditions (Code of Federal Regulations, 1994). When queried as to what conditions she would call the cockpit when sterile, she responded that she would call in case of fire or a problem passenger. Confusion over, and rigid interpretation of, the sterile cockpit rule is not unusual as our studies have shown.

The FAA also noted that:

Many flight attendants do not have a clear understanding of what "sterile cockpit" means. Flight attendants need to be given specific information about what type of information merits contacting flight crewmembers during the sterile period. Hesitancy or reluctance on the part of a flight attendant to contact the flight crewmembers with important safety information because of a misconception of the sterile cockpit rule is potentially even more serious than the unnecessary distraction caused by needless violations of the sterile cockpit

Japan Airlines (JAL) took this a step further, describing in a flight attendant training manual several situations that would warrant flight-attendant-to-pilot communication during take-off and landing. Such situations included:

- Any outbreak of fire;
- The presence of smoke in the cabin;
- Any abnormality in the attitude of the aircraft during take-off and landing;
- The existence of any abnormal noise or vibration; and
- The observance of any fuel or other leakages.

JAL also included guidance on when to make the calls to the pilots ("upon discovery of any abnormality"), what to call ("even [when] not absolutely sure, make the call") and how to call ("use the pilot call for emergency communication").

== See also ==
- Aviation safety
- Controlled flight into terrain
- Crew resource management
- Distracted driving
- Crashes attributed to violation of the rule:
  - Air Florida Flight 90, 1982
  - Continental Airlines Flight 1713, 1987
  - Widerøe Flight 710, 1988
  - Delta Air Lines Flight 1141, 1988
  - LAPA Flight 3142, 1999
  - Air Algérie Flight 6289, 2003
  - Corporate Airlines Flight 5966, 2004
  - Comair Flight 5191, 2006
  - Colgan Air Flight 3407, 2009
  - Polish Air Force Flight 101 (Smolensk air disaster), 2010
  - Sukhoi Civil Aircraft Flight 36801 (Mount Salak Sukhoi Superjet crash), 2012
  - US-Bangla Airlines Flight 211, 2018
