= James William Colbert Jr. =

American physician-scientist and immunologist (1920–1974)

- Colbert, c. 1950
- Born: December 15, 1920; The Bronx, New York City, U.S.
- Died: September 11, 1974 (aged 53); Charlotte, North Carolina, U.S.
- Education: College of the Holy Cross (BA); Columbia University (MD)
- Occupations: Physician; professor; academic administrator
- Spouse: Lorna Elizabeth Tuck (m. 1944)
- Children: 11, including Stephen and Elizabeth
- Medical career
- Profession: Immunologist
- Field: Infectious diseases
- Institutions: Yale School of Medicine; Saint Louis University School of Medicine; National Institute of Allergy and Infectious Diseases; Medical University of South Carolina

James William Colbert Jr. (December 15, 1920 – September 11, 1974) was an American physician-scientist and immunologist. He was a professor of medicine at Yale University from 1951 to 1953, the dean of the Saint Louis University School of Medicine from 1953 to 1961, then a director and academic at the National Institute of Allergy and Infectious Diseases and the Medical University of South Carolina.

After graduating from the College of the Holy Cross, Colbert earned his medical degree from Columbia University with a research specialty in infectious diseases. During the late 1940s and early 1950s, he conducted research on viral hepatitis with the United States Army Medical Corps before becoming a professor at the Yale School of Medicine. In 1953, at age 32, he was named dean of the Saint Louis University School of Medicine, becoming the youngest dean of a medical school in the country.

Colbert had eleven children, including comedian Stephen Colbert and politician Elizabeth Colbert Busch. He was killed, along with two of his sons, in the crash of Eastern Air Lines Flight 212 near Charlotte, North Carolina, in 1974. At the time of his death, he was the vice president of medical affairs at the Medical University of South Carolina.

== Early life and education ==
James William Colbert Jr. was born with his twin sister, Margaret, on December 15, 1920, in the Bronx, New York City, to James William Colbert Sr. and Mary Tormey Colbert. His father was a sales manager who sold glass bottles for Owens Illinois Glassworks. The senior Colbert was born in Chesterfield, Illinois, in 1894 to an Irish immigrant family which claimed descent from Hugh O'Neill, Earl of Tyrone.

The Colbert family initially lived on Jerome Avenue in the Bronx. In the mid-1920s, they moved from Jerome Avenue to a larger apartment at 2877 Grand Concourse. They were Roman Catholics, and, in the early 1930s, moved from the Bronx to Monroe Avenue in Larchmont, New York. Colbert attended St. Augustine's School in Larchmont for junior high school, where he also served as an altar boy, and subsequently attended Iona Preparatory School in nearby New Rochelle, New York.

Colbert met his future wife, Lorna Elizabeth Tuck, in 1932, when they both were twelve years old. She was also of Irish descent, with lineage from County Laois, Ireland. During high school, Colbert was a straight-A student whom Tuck later remembered as "always bookish". In high school, he won honors in a local art competition. After graduating from Iona Preparatory in 1938, he enrolled at the College of the Holy Cross in Worcester, Massachusetts.

As an undergraduate at Holy Cross, Colbert was voted the "best informed" member of his class and the "best debator." He studied philosophy, a subject in which he maintained a deep interest, and graduated from Holy Cross with his Bachelor of Arts, magna cum laude, in 1942 as the valedictorian of his class. He initially considered pursuing philosophy after graduation, but ultimately chose to study medicine instead, entering the College of Physicians and Surgeons at Columbia University in the fall of 1942. At Columbia, he concentrated on immunology and infectious diseases. He earned his Doctor of Medicine (M.D.) in 1945 and then completed his internship at Bellevue Hospital in New York City before entering the United States Army Medical Corps in 1946.

== Academic career ==
=== Yale professor and deanships (1949–1961) ===
After serving in the U.S. Army Medical Corps in postwar Europe, Colbert returned to the United States and completed his residency at the Yale School of Medicine. In 1949, he returned to the Army Medical Corps, serving as a representative of the Armed Forces Epidemiological Board, where he became the director of its Hepatitis Research Team, and the technical director of the Hepatitis Laboratory in Munich, Germany. His early research centered particularly on viral hepatitis and was conducted in association with both the Army and Yale. In 1949, the Yale Journal of Biology and Medicine published his review of animal experimentation in infectious and serum hepatitis.

During this period, Colbert became an instructor and then assistant professor of medicine at the Yale School of Medicine. In 1950, he co-authored, with Maurice J. Strauss and Robert H. Green, a preliminary report on the use of propamidine in the treatment of cutaneous blastomycosis, published in the Journal of Investigative Dermatology. In 1951, Colbert and his collaborators published a study examining the use of adrenocorticotropic hormone (ACTH) in acute viral hepatitis. In 1952, Colbert, Luitgard Bungards, and Marjorie Knowlton published a study of aureomycin, chloromycetin, and terramycin as treatments for acute viral hepatitis.

In 1951, Colbert was named the assistant dean of the Yale School of Medicine. In 1953, he left the university to become the dean of the Saint Louis University School of Medicine, where, at age 32, he became the youngest dean of an American medical school. During 1960, he served as chair of the St. Louis chapter of Doctors for Kennedy, an organization supporting John F. Kennedy's 1960 presidential campaign. He remained dean at Saint Louis University until 1961. In late 1961, Colbert was dismissed as dean following administrative issues at the medical school. He then became the associate director for extramural programs at the National Institute of Allergy and Infectious Diseases (NIAID), part of the National Institutes of Health in Bethesda, Maryland.

=== NIAID director and Medical University of South Carolina (1961–1974) ===
At the NIAID, Colbert was involved in the administration of the institute's extramural research programs. As associate director for extramural research, he was responsible for planning and directing NIAID's research-grant, training-grant, and fellowship programs. He also spent a period away from NIAID as the director of the Advanced Planning Staff for the Surgeon General of the United States, before returning to the institute in 1968.

On February 1, 1969, Colbert joined what was then the Medical College of South Carolina (now the Medical University of South Carolina) as its first vice president for academic affairs. He arrived shortly before the beginning of the Charleston hospital strike of 1969 and helped bring the dispute to a settlement. During his five years at the institution, Colbert oversaw the university during a period of extensive expansion. He was especially involved in developing South Carolina's statewide system of health education, the Area Health Education Consortium (AHEC). He was also instrumental in developing the Medical University's family practice program and overseeing the university's development into a nationally prominent medical center.

In 1974, Colbert recruited virologist Albert Sabin, developer of the oral polio vaccine, to MUSC as distinguished research professor of biomedicine. Sabin, who had known Colbert for more than 25 years, later described him as "my very good friend".

Colbert also served on the NIH Medical Education Review Committee, the National Advisory Board for the Selective Service System for Physicians and Surgeons, the Veterans Administration Institutional Research Review Committee, and the board of directors of the Health Education Media Association. He was the chairman of the Regional Advisory Group to the South Carolina Regional Medical Program and lectured at the Brookings Institution. Colbert remained vice president for academic affairs at MUSC until his death in 1974.

== Awards and honors ==
Colbert was a member of Alpha Omega Alpha, the medical honor society, and Sigma Xi, the scientific honor society. He was also a member of the American Association for the Advancement of Science.

In 2009, the Medical University of South Carolina renamed its Library-Administration Building the James W. Colbert Education Center and Library in his honor. In 2017, MUSC inaugurated the Dr. James W. Colbert Jr. Endowed Lectureship in his memory, with physician BJ Miller delivering the inaugural lecture.

== Personal life and death ==
Aerial view of Flight 212's crash site, 1974

Colbert married Tuck on August 26, 1944, while he was still a medical student. They soon started a family, and had eleven children together: Jim, Ed, William, Mary, Margo, Tom, Jay, Paul, Peter, politician and businesswoman Elizabeth Colbert Busch, and comedian Stephen Colbert.

=== Eastern Air Lines Flight 212 crash ===
On the morning of September 11, 1974, Colbert left his family's home on James Island, South Carolina with his sons Paul, 18, and Peter, 15, and traveled to Charleston International Airport. Colbert was accompanying his sons to New Milford, Connecticut, where they were to enroll at the Canterbury School. The three boarded Eastern Air Lines Flight 212, which departed Charleston at about 7:00 a.m. for a scheduled flight to Charlotte, North Carolina.

At approximately 7:34 a.m., the plane, a Douglas DC-9-31, crashed 3.3 miles (5.3 km) short of runway 36 at Douglas Municipal Airport while approaching in visibility restricted by dense ground fog. The aircraft was destroyed by the impact and ensuing fire; of the 82 people aboard, 11 initially survived the accident, and one of those survivors died from injuries 29 days later. Colbert and both of his sons were killed in the crash. He was 53 years old. The National Transportation Safety Board determined that the probable cause of the crash was the flight crew's lack of altitude awareness at critical points during the approach, which it attributed to poor cockpit discipline and the crew's failure to follow prescribed procedures.
