= Comair Flight 5191 =

2006 aviation accident in Kentucky

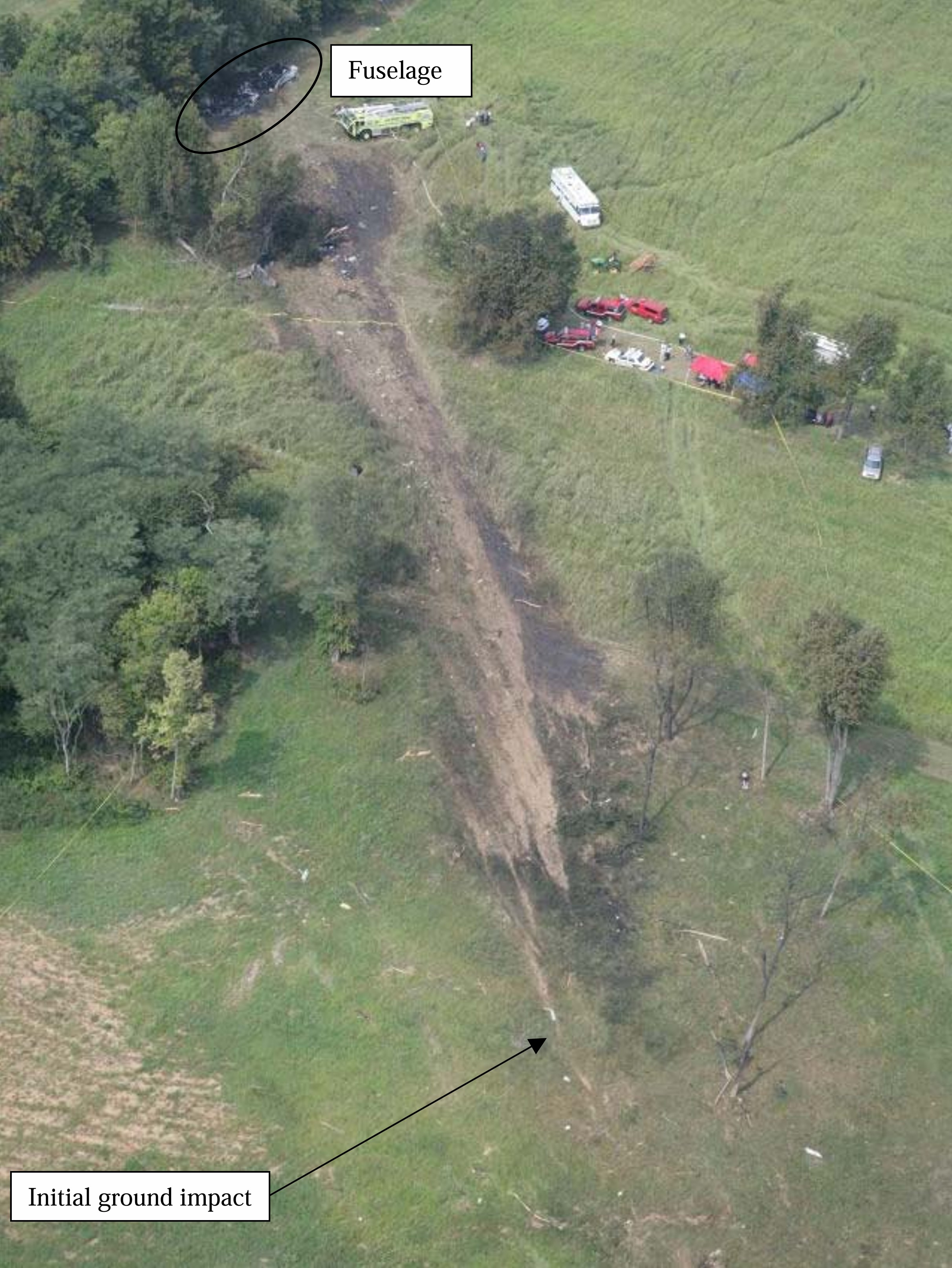
- Wreckage path of the aircraft

Accident
- Date: August 27, 2006
- Summary: Runway excursion following takeoff from wrong runway due to pilot error
- Site: Blue Grass Airport, Lexington, Kentucky, US; 38.0379°N 84.6154°W

Aircraft
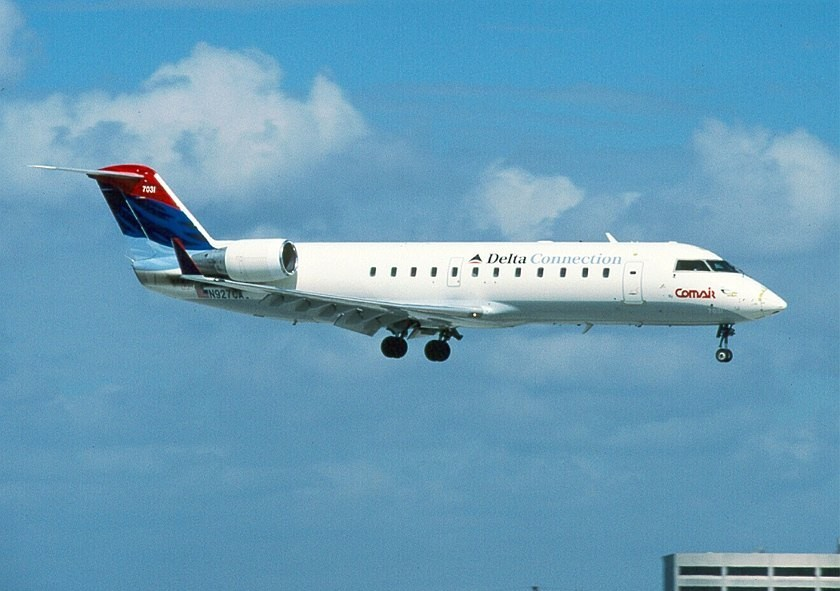
- A Bombardier CRJ100 in Delta Connection livery, similar to the one involved
- Aircraft type: Bombardier CRJ100
- Operator: Comair on behalf of Delta Connection
- IATA flight No.: OH5191
- ICAO flight No.: COM5191
- Call sign: COMAIR 191
- Registration: N431CA
- Flight origin: Blue Grass Airport, Lexington, Kentucky
- Destination: Hartsfield–Jackson Atlanta International Airport, Atlanta
- Occupants: 50
- Passengers: 47
- Crew: 3
- Fatalities: 49
- Injuries: 1
- Survivors: 1

Comair Flight 5191 was a scheduled U.S. domestic passenger flight from Lexington, Kentucky, to Atlanta, Georgia. On the morning of August 27, 2006, at around 06:07 EDT (10:07 UTC), the Bombardier CRJ100 crashed while attempting to take off from Blue Grass Airport in Fayette County, Kentucky, four miles (six kilometers; three nautical miles) west of the central business district of the city of Lexington.

The aircraft was assigned the airport's Runway 22 for the takeoff but used Runway 26 instead. Runway 26 was too short for a safe takeoff, causing the aircraft to overrun the end of the runway before it could become airborne. It crashed just past the end of the runway, killing all 47 passengers and 2 of the 3 crew members. It was the second-deadliest accident involving the CRJ100/200 after China Eastern Airlines Flight 5210, which had crashed two years earlier and claimed 55 lives.

The first officer, James Polehinke, was the pilot flying at the time of the accident and was the sole survivor. Captain Jeffrey Clay was the one who had primary responsibility for taxiing to the wrong runway. In the National Transportation Safety Board's report on the crash, investigators concluded that the likely cause of the crash was pilot error.

== Flight details ==
The aircraft was a 50-seat Bombardier Canadair Regional Jet CRJ100ER, serial number 7472. It was manufactured in January 2001 and was delivered new to the airline.

The captain was 35-year old Jeffrey Clay. He had 4,710 flight hours, including 3,082 hours on the CRJ100.

The first officer was 44-year-old James Polehinke. Prior to his employment by Comair, Polehinke worked for Gulfstream International Airlines as a captain on the Beechcraft 1900. He had 6,564 flight hours, including 940 hours as a pilot in command and 3,564 hours on the CRJ100.

== Accident ==
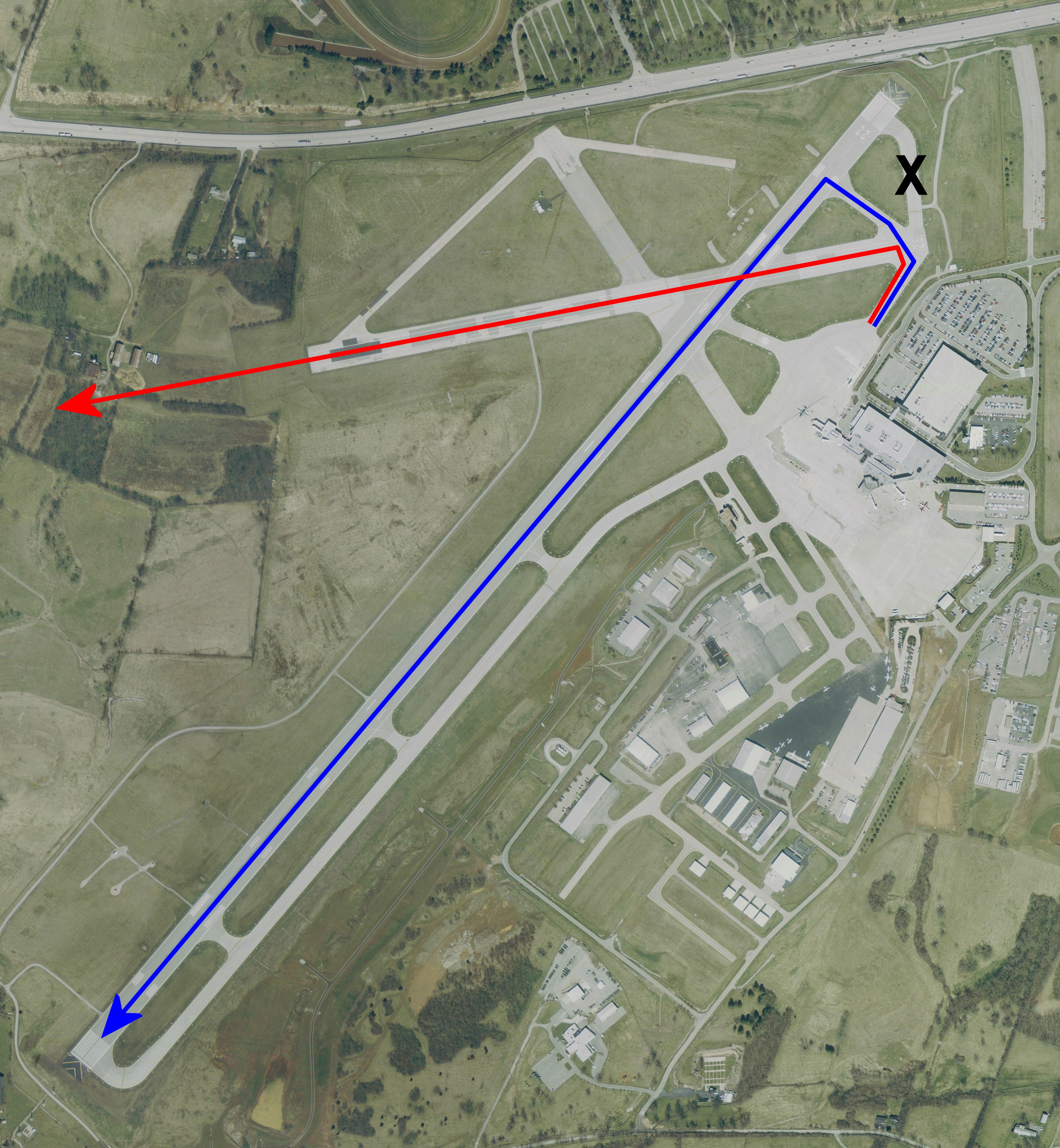
Approximate paths at Blue Grass Airport (pictured before airport construction had completed weeks before the crash) Proper path via Runway 22 Actual path via Runway 26, ending at approximate crash site. X marks the closed taxiway

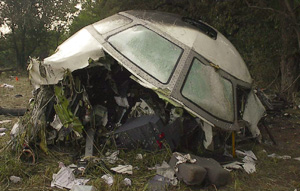
Wreckage of the cockpit

ATC traffic of the plane at the moment of the crash

Analysis of the cockpit voice recorder (CVR) indicated that the aircraft was cleared for takeoff from Runway 22, a 7,003-foot (2,135 m) runway used by most airline traffic at Lexington. However, after confirming the takeoff clearance for Runway 22, Clay taxied onto Runway 26, which was only 3,501 feet (1,067 m) long, unlit and unauthorized for commercial use. Clay then relinquished flight control to Polehinke for takeoff. Based upon an estimated takeoff weight of 49,087 pounds (22,265 kg), the aircraft's manufacturer calculated that a speed of 138 knots (159 mph; 256 km/h) and a distance of 3,744 feet (1,141 m) would have been needed for rotation (increasing nose-up pitch), with more runway needed to achieve liftoff. At about an hour before daybreak and at a speed approaching 100 knots (120 mph; 190 km/h), Polehinke remarked, "That is weird with no lights," referring to the lack of lighting on Runway 26. Clay replied in agreement, but the flight data recorder offered no indication that either pilot had tried to abort the takeoff as the aircraft accelerated to 137 knots (158 mph; 254 km/h).

Clay called for rotation, but the aircraft reached the end of the runway before it could become airborne. It then struck a low earthen wall adjacent to a ditch, briefly leaving the ground, clipped the airport perimeter fence with its landing gear and smashed into trees, separating the fuselage and flight deck from the tail. The aircraft crashed about 1,800 feet (550 m) from the end of the runway, and it was destroyed in the resulting fire.

== CVR transcript ==
Transcript of Comair flight 5191's CVR (Times are expressed in CST)
* = Unintelligible word; () = Questionable text; (()) = Commentary; — = Break in continuity; Shading = Radio communication; ## = Expletive
Time	Source	Content
06:04:38	First Officer (Over PA)	And folks one * time from the flight deck, we'd like to welcome you aboard. We're going to be underway momentarily.... sit back, relax and enjoy the flight. Kelly, when you have a chance, please prepare the cabin.
06:04:48	((Sound of hi-lo chime of cabin/cockpit intercom))	
06:04:49	First Officer	Pre-takeoff * complete cabin report received CAS.
06:04:53	Captain	Checked and clear.
06:04:54	*Unclear*	**, Six or seven ** (Whispered)
06:04:49	Captain	Oh.
06:04:58	First Officer	Oh Yeah.
06:04:59	First Officer	I'm looking at it 'cause like, okay I see seven but it's
06:05:01	Captain	Yeah there's a green extra one there but...
06:05:06	First Officer	Uuuh, cabin report's received, CAS clear ** before takeoff check's complete, ready.
06:05:12	Captain	All set
06:05:15	Captain 5191 (to LEX Tower)	At your leisure Comair one-twenty-one ready to go.
06:05:17	LEX (to 5191)	Comair one-ninety-one, Lexington, uh, Tower, fly runway heading, cleared for takeoff.
06:05:19	*Unclear*	**
06:05:21	Captain 5191 (to LEX Tower)	Runway heading, cleared for takeoff one-ninety-one.
06:05:23	Captain	And line-up check
06:05:34	Captain	Throw that bad boy on
06:05:41	First Officer	Transponder's on, packs on, bleeds closed, cleared for take-off, runway heading. Six grand.
06:05:45	Captain	All right
06:05:46	First Officer	Anti-ice off, lights set, takeoff config's okay, line-up check's complete.
06:05:51	((Sound of clicks similar to pilot adjusting his seat))	
06:05:57	Captain	All yours, Jim
06:05:58	First Officer	My brakes, my controls
06:06:05	((Sound of increasing RPM))	
06:06:07	First Officer	Set thrust, please
06:06:11	Captain	Thrust set
06:06:16	First Officer	That is weird with no lights.
06:06:18	Captain	Yeah
06:06:24	Captain	One hundred knots.
06:06:25	First Officer	Checks.
06:06:31	Captain	V-one, rotate-
06:06:31	Captain	Whoa!
06:06:32	((Unknown ambient noise))	
06:06:32	Captain	Fuck.
06:06:33.0	((Sound of impact))	
06:06:33.3	Voice unidentified	((Unintelligible exclamation))
06:06:33.8	((Sound similar to stick shaker))	
06:06:34.7	((Sound of chime))	
06:06:34.7	((Sound similar to stall warning starts and continues to end of recording))	
06:06:35.1	Voice unidentified	#
06:06:35.7	Captain	((Unintelligible exclamation))
End of recording

== Passengers ==
Nationality	Passengers		Crew		Total	
Nationality	Total	Died	Total	Died	Total	Died
United States	42	42	3	2	45	44
Canada	3	3	-	-	3	3
Japan (Note: Both Japanese passengers resided in Lexington.)	2	2	-	-	2	2
Total	47	47	3	2	50	49

Of the 50 people on board, 49 were killed (all 47 passengers and 2 of the 3 crew members). The victims died from thermal injuries, smoke inhalation, and traumatic injuries caused by the impact and subsequent fire. Comair released the passenger manifest on August 29, 2006.

Most of the passengers were American citizens from the Lexington area, ranging in age from 16 to 72. They included a young couple who had been married the previous day and were traveling to California on their honeymoon.

=== Sole survivor ===
James Polehinke, the first officer, suffered serious injuries, including multiple broken bones, a collapsed lung and severe bleeding. Lexington-Fayette and airport police officers extracted him from the wreckage. He underwent surgery for his injuries, including an amputation of his left leg. Doctors later determined that Polehinke had suffered brain damage and had no memory of the crash or of the events preceding it.

== Investigation ==
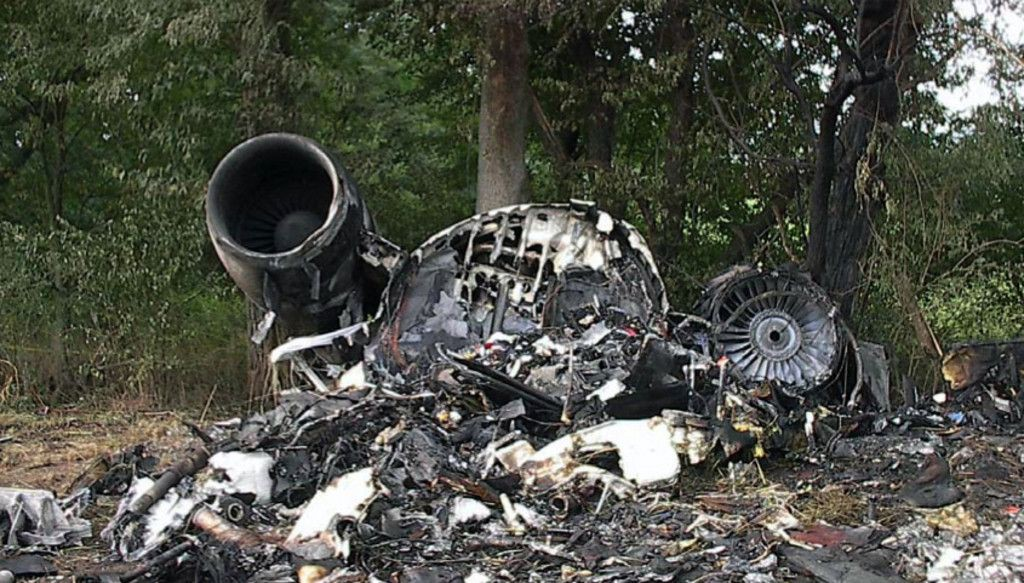
The aft section of the fuselage

During the investigation, the Federal Aviation Administration (FAA) discovered that tower-staffing levels at Blue Grass Airport violated an internal policy as reflected in August 2005 verbal guidance requiring two controllers on duty in facilities that have combined radar approach control and tower with radar functions, with one controller monitoring air traffic on radar, and the other performing other tower functions including communications with taxiing aircraft. At the time of the accident, the single controller in the tower was performing both tower and radar duties. On August 30, 2006, the FAA announced that Blue Grass Airport, as well as additional airports that were understaffing their overnight shifts, would use two controllers on duty, or shift radar responsibilities to Indianapolis Center when only one was available. The FAA stated that a second controller would not have prevented the accident.

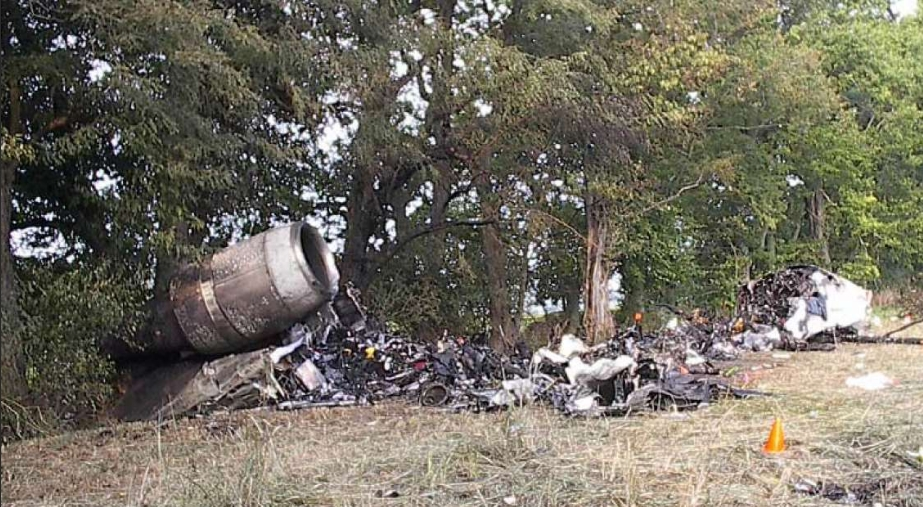
The engine and debris

Comair discovered after the accident that all of its pilots had been using an airport map that did not accurately reflect changes made to the airport layout during ongoing construction work. The National Transportation Safety Board (NTSB) later determined that this did not contribute to the accident. Construction work was halted after the accident to preserve evidence needed for the investigation.

The NTSB released several reports on January 17, 2007, including transcripts of the CVR and an engineering report.

In April 2007, acting on a recommendation issued by the NTSB during its investigation of the Comair 5191 accident, the FAA issued a safety notice that reiterated advice to pilots to positively confirm their position before crossing the hold-short line onto the takeoff runway, (Note: The hold-short line is the demarcation between the runway and taxiway.) and again when initiating takeoff. The NTSB offered four further recommendations: three measures to avoid fatigue affecting the performance of air traffic controllers and one to prevent controllers from carrying out non-essential administrative tasks while aircraft are taxiing under their control. The recommendations were partly prompted by four earlier accidents; the board was unable to determine whether fatigue contributed to the Comair accident. In May, acting on another NTSB recommendation, the FAA advised that pilot training should include specific guidance on runway-lighting requirements for take-off at night.

In July 2007, a Comair flying instructor testified that he would have failed both pilots for violating sterile flight deck rules. Later that month, the NTSB released its final report, citing the pilots' "non-pertinent conversation" as a contributing factor in the accident.

=== Probable cause ===
During a public meeting on July 26, 2007, the NTSB announced the probable cause of the accident:

The National Transportation Safety Board determines that the probable cause of this accident was the flight crew members' failure to use available cues and aids to identify the airplane's location on the airport surface during taxi and their failure to cross-check and verify that the airplane was on the correct runway before takeoff. Contributing to the accident were the flight crew's nonpertinent conversations during taxi, which resulted in a loss of positional awareness and the Federal Aviation Administration's failure to require that all runway crossings be authorized only by specific air traffic control clearances.

NTSB investigators concluded that the likely cause was that Clay and Polehinke ignored clues that indicated that they were on the wrong runway, failed to confirm their position on the runway and violated sterile flight deck rules.

Clay's widow strongly opposes the NTSB's assessment blaming the pilots, stating that other factors contributed, "including an understaffed control tower and an inaccurate runway map."

== Aftermath ==
A memorial service for the victims was held on August 31, 2006, at the Lexington Opera House. A second public memorial service was held on September 10, 2006, at Rupp Arena in Lexington. The Lexington Herald-Leader published a list of the victims with short biographies.

The Flight 5191 Memorial Commission was established shortly after the crash to create an appropriate memorial for the victims, first responders and community. The commission selected the University of Kentucky Arboretum as its memorial site.

The Flight 5191 Memorial, created by Douwe Blumberg, consists of a sculpture of 49 stainless-steel birds in flight over a base of black granite.

In July 2008, US district judge Karl Forester ruled that Delta Air Lines could not be held liable for the crash, because although Comair is a wholly owned subsidiary of Delta, Comair maintains its own management and policies and employs its own pilots. In December 2009, Forester granted a passenger family's motion for "partial summary judgment" determining, as a matter of law, that Comair's flight crew was negligent, and that this negligence was a substantial factor causing the crash of Flight 5191.

Runway 8/26 at Blue Grass Airport was closed in March 2009, and the new 4,000-foot (1,200 m) Runway 9/27 opened on August 4, 2010. The new runway has been built on a separate location not connected to Runway 22 and has completely enveloped the site of the crash.

=== Lawsuits ===
Families of 45 of the 47 passengers sued Comair for negligence; families of the other 2 victims settled with the airline before filing litigation. Three sample cases were to be heard on August 4, 2008, but the trial was indefinitely postponed after Comair reached a settlement with the majority of the families. Comair sued the airport authority over its runway signs and markings as well as the FAA, which had only one air traffic controller on duty, contrary to a memo that it had previously issued requiring two workers on overnight shifts. The case against the airport authority was dismissed on sovereign immunity grounds, and this ruling was upheld by the Kentucky Supreme Court on October 1, 2009. In Comair's case against the United States, a settlement was reached with the government agreeing to pay 22% of the liability for the crash while Comair agreed to pay the remaining 78%.

All but one of the passengers' families settled their cases. After a four-day jury trial in Lexington that ended on December 7, 2009, the estate and daughters of 39‑year‑old victim Bryan Woodward were awarded compensatory damages in the amount of $7.1 million. Though Comair challenged this verdict as excessive, on April 2, 2010, Judge Forester overruled Comair's objections and upheld the verdict. The case, formally known as Hebert v. Comair, was set for a punitive damages jury trial on July 19, 2010. In that trial, a different jury was to decide whether Comair was guilty of gross negligence that was a substantial factor causing the crash and, if so, the punitive damages to assess. The decision to allow a jury trial was reversed in a later hearing, with the judge ruling that the company could not be punished for the "reprehensible conduct" of its pilots.

In May 2012, Polehinke filed a lawsuit against the airport and the company that designed the runway and taxi lights. The estates or families of 21 of the 47 passengers filed lawsuits against Polehinke. In response, Polehinke's attorney, William E. Johnson, raised the possibility of contributory negligence on the part of the passengers. When asked by the plaintiffs' attorney David Royse, who criticized the statements, to explain what that meant, Johnson replied that the passengers "should have been aware of the dangerous conditions that existed in that there had been considerable media coverage about the necessity of improving runway conditions at the airport."

== In popular culture ==
The crash was featured in the third episode of Season 21 of Mayday, also known as Air Crash Investigation. The episode is titled "Tragic Takeoff". The flight's first officer, the crash's only survivor, was later featured in a film about sole survivors of plane crashes.

== See also ==
- Aviation safety – State in which risks associated with aviation are at an acceptable level
- China Airlines Flight 204 – 1989 aviation accident
- List of accidents and incidents involving commercial aircraft
- List of aviation accidents and incidents with a sole survivor
- Singapore Airlines Flight 006 – 2000 aviation accident in Taiwan
- Western Airlines Flight 2605 – 1979 aviation accident in Mexico
