= Eastern Air Lines Flight 212 =

1974 aviation accident

- An aerial view of the crash site of N8984E.

Accident
- Date: September 11, 1974
- Summary: Controlled flight into terrain
- Site: Near Douglas Municipal Airport, Charlotte, North Carolina, United States; 35°09′14″N 80°55′34″W

Aircraft
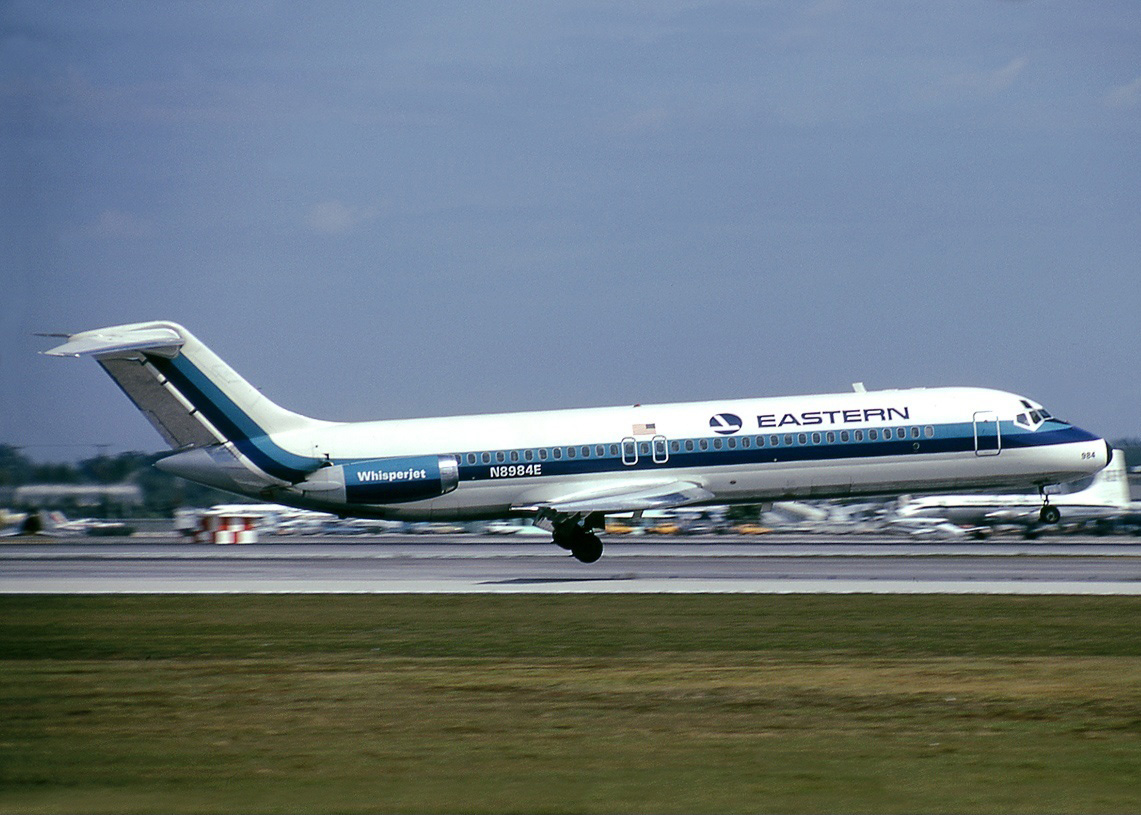
- N8984E, the aircraft involved in the accident, pictured in February 1974
- Aircraft type: McDonnell Douglas DC-9-31
- Operator: Eastern Air Lines
- IATA flight No.: EA212
- ICAO flight No.: EAL212
- Call sign: EASTERN 212
- Registration: N8984E
- Flight origin: Charleston Municipal Airport, Charleston, South Carolina
- Stopover: Douglas Municipal Airport, Charlotte, North Carolina
- Destination: Chicago O'Hare, Chicago, Illinois
- Occupants: 82
- Passengers: 78
- Crew: 4
- Fatalities: 72
- Injuries: 9
- Survivors: 10

Eastern Air Lines Flight 212 was a scheduled domestic passenger flight from Charleston Municipal Airport, South Carolina to Chicago O'Hare, Illinois, with an intermediate stop in Charlotte, North Carolina. On September 11, 1974, the aircraft operating the flight, a McDonnell Douglas DC-9, crashed during approach to Charlotte Douglas International Airport in North Carolina, killing 72 of the 82 people on board.

The National Transportation Safety Board conducted an investigation and determined that pilot error was the primary cause of the crash. During the approach, the flight crew was engrossed in idle conversation instead of monitoring their flight instruments and altitude, allowing the aircraft to descend far past the safe altitude. The aircraft crashed several miles before the runway. The investigation resulted in the issuance of the sterile cockpit rule, which prohibited pilots from interactions irrelevant to the flight during critical phases, such as landing and takeoff.

== Background ==
=== Aircraft ===
The aircraft was a five-year-old McDonnell Douglas DC-9-31 registered as N8984E with serial number 47400. It was delivered to Eastern Air Lines on January 30, 1969. In its five years of service, it had logged a total of 16,860.6 hours of flying time.

=== Passengers and crew ===
The aircraft was carrying 78 passengers and four crew members. There were four children on board. Most of the passengers were residents of Charlotte and many were members of the U.S. Navy.

Among the passengers was the vice president for academic affairs of the Medical University of South Carolina, James William Colbert Jr., and two of his sons—the father and two brothers, respectively, of future television personality Stephen Colbert.

The flight-deck crew was led by Captain James E. Reeves (age 49). He had been with the airline since 1956 and had accrued 8,876 flight hours, including 3,856 hours on the DC-9. He was regarded as one of the airline's veteran pilots. First Officer James M. Daniels Jr. (age 36) had been with the airline since 1966 and had accrued 3,016 flight hours, including 2,693 hours on the DC-9.

== Accident ==
Eastern Air Lines Flight 212 was a regularly scheduled flight from Charleston to Chicago with an intermediate stop in Charlotte. The scheduled duration of the flight to Charlotte was less than one hour. First Officer Daniels was the pilot flying as the aircraft departed Charleston at 07:00 local time. The takeoff and cruise were uneventful. While en route, the crew sought information from the automatic terminal information service, which stated that the weather in Charlotte would be partially obscured with broken clouds and visibility of about 1.5 nautical miles because of ground fog. The flight proceeded normally until the approach.

=== Approach ===
At 07:25., Atlanta ATC requested the plane's altitude, and the crew responded, "We're slowing at ten." Atlanta ATC transferred the flight to the approach controller in Charlotte, who directed them to fly toward the airport's very high frequency omnidirectional range (VOR) and descend and maintain 6,000 feet. Captain Reeves acknowledged the message and then completed the in-range checklist, and the first officer responded "OK". Instead of focusing on the approach, which was familiar to both pilots, they began discussing the Watergate scandal.

The approach to Charlotte required the crew to execute a double bend. The first bend would direct the flight toward the southwest, followed by the second toward the northwest. After aligning with the airport, the flight would continue to the airport's final approach fix (FAF), located 5.5 nautical miles from the runway, known as Ross Intersection, and then descend to and maintain the minimum descent altitude of 1,120 feet until the runway came into view.

As the aircraft descended to 6,000 feet, the Charlotte controller asked the crew to turn to heading 240, toward the southwest. Reeves responded by reporting an altitude of 6,000 feet. The crew received another clearance to descend and maintain at 4,000 feet. They were traveling through the first bend and began to slow their approach. The flaps were extended to 15 degrees and the airspeed slowed to 220 knots. The flight was eventually handed to Charlotte's final approach controller on another frequency, who asked them to descend to 3,000 feet.

After ending the conversation, the pilot and first officer became engrossed in conversation unrelated to the flight operation, ranging from politics to used cars, particularly focusing on the 1973 oil crisis.

07:29:46	Daniels	One thing that kills me, is the goddamned mess and all crap that's going on now. We should be taking some definite direction to save this goddamn country.
07:29:54	Daniels	Arabs are taking over every damn thing, they bought, hell they got so much real estate, so much land, they bought an island for seventeen million dollars off Carolina, they...
07:30:01	Daniels	the [expletive] stock market, and the Swiss are going to [expletive] sink our money gold over there.
07:30:23	ATC	Eastern two twelve, reduce to 160 knots.
07:30:26	Reeves	Okay
07:30:32	Reeves	Yes, sir. Boy, they got the money, don't they? They got so much [expletive] money
07:30:35	Daniels	That stuff is coming in at such a fantastic rate.

The crew continued the idle conversation until 07:31:09, when the final-approach controller asked them to turn toward heading 350 degrees and cleared them for a VOR approach. The plane was now on the second bend of the route, heading toward Runway 36. The controller had cleared them to descend to the minimum height, but the aircraft continued descending well beyond 3,000 feet. The crew intended to fly at the airport's minimum descent altitude (MDA).

The altitude alert signal sounded as the aircraft continued to descend. At 07:31, Reeves noticed the Carolina Skytower, a 262-foot-high amusement-park landmark at Carowinds used by many pilots for landing. ATC asked the crew to switch to another frequency and told the men that they were second in line for landing. The crew then discussed the Skytower.

07:32:13	Reeves	Carowinds
07:32:17	Daniels	Ah! That tower. Would that tower be it or not?
07:32:20	Reeves	No I ... Carowinds, I don't think it is.
07:32:26	Reeves	We're too far in. Too far in. Carowinds is in back of us.
07:32:27	Daniels	I believe it is [Carowinds]
07:32:29	Reeves	By God, that looks like it! You know, it's Carowinds.
07:32:33	Reeves	Yes, that's the tower!

Daniels asked Reeves to extend the landing gear. A few seconds later, the terrain warning sounded, indicating that the aircraft was below 1,000 feet, but the men silenced the alarm. The crew eventually diverted their attention to the landing checklist.

The nose was raised slightly to reduce speed, which was still above the limit for landing. The aircraft neared Ross Intersection, the airport's FAF, where they would decide whether to continue the descent or go around. They intended to reach the airport's MDA of 394 feet.

07:33:17	Reeves	There's, ah, Ross ... Now we can go, uh, down
07:33:22	Daniels	How about [flaps] fifty degrees, please
07:33:34	Reeves	Fifty

The aircraft eventually crossed Ross Intersection and the crew increased the rate of descent. Reeves reported their position to the ATC, and the controller cleared them to land at Runway 36. After completing the landing checklist, he said, "Yeah, we're all ready".

=== Crash and immediate aftermath ===
External videos
- CVR recording
- Partial CVR recording of the flight on YouTube

As the aircraft continued its descent, flight attendant Colette Watson had just taken her seat after switching positions with a coworker. The passengers grew visibly alarmed as rows of trees loomed closer outside the windows. Reeves remarked, "All we have to do is find the airport." Moments later, as the aircraft broke through ground fog, the crew suddenly saw the terrain rushing toward them at extreme speed. Reeves and Daniels shouted and pulled the yoke in a final attempt to raise the nose, but the aircraft was already too low to recover.

07:33:52	Reeves	Yeah, we're all ready
07:33:55	Reeves	All we have to do is find the airport
07:33:57	Daniels	Yeah
07:33:57.3		(Sounds of shouting)
07:33:58		(Sounds of initial impact)
07:33:58		End of recording

The right wingtip impacted a tree, followed by another impact on the left wing, shearing a cluster of pine trees. The aircraft continued for more than 550 feet before it slammed into a cornfield with a slight angle to the left. The left wing broke, causing fuel to spill and creating large trailing flames. The right wing and stabilizer separated from the plane. The aircraft broke into three sections: the cockpit and a part of the forward cabin, the main fuselage and the tailplane, which contained several rows of seats.

The sections of the aircraft continued in motion. The cockpit section traveled in one direction, while the fuselage and empennage lurched forward separately into a wooded area, striking more trees and ejecting many passengers as it further broke apart. The tailplane spun several times in loops before finally coming to a rest. The aircraft finally stopped approximately 995 feet from initial impact.

A total of 32 people were killed upon impact, including Reeves, and another 50 initially survived. Daniels survived with both legs severely injured. Flight attendant Colette Watson woke, uninjured, to find the majority of the cabin missing. Only a few rows of seats of the first-class cabin remained intact alongside the cockpit. Frank Mihalek was the only passenger who survived in that cabin. He and Watson entered the cockpit and evacuated with Daniels through the cockpit window by the pilot's seat. Many in the main fuselage were burned by the ensuing fires. Several survivors exited through breaks in the walls while others succumbed to the smoke.

After Charlotte ATC lost contact with Flight 212, a plume of smoke appeared south of the airport, ascending beyond the ground fog. ATC immediately notified the airport's firefighting unit, and the first vehicle arrived at 07:40 but faced difficulty accessing the crash site because of its location. Within 45 minutes of the first arrival, all survivors were evacuated to Charlotte Memorial Hospital for treatment. The smoldering wreckage was doused and rescue efforts completed by 10:30.

A total of 14 survivors were found alive by rescuers. One was uninjured, while nine were discharged with varying injuries. Another four were admitted to intensive care for extensive burns. Among them were two 17-year-old teenagers who later died. One other burn victim survived, and the fourth died approximately 29 days after the crash, bringing the death toll to 72. Among the dead were the three members of the Colbert family.

== Investigation ==
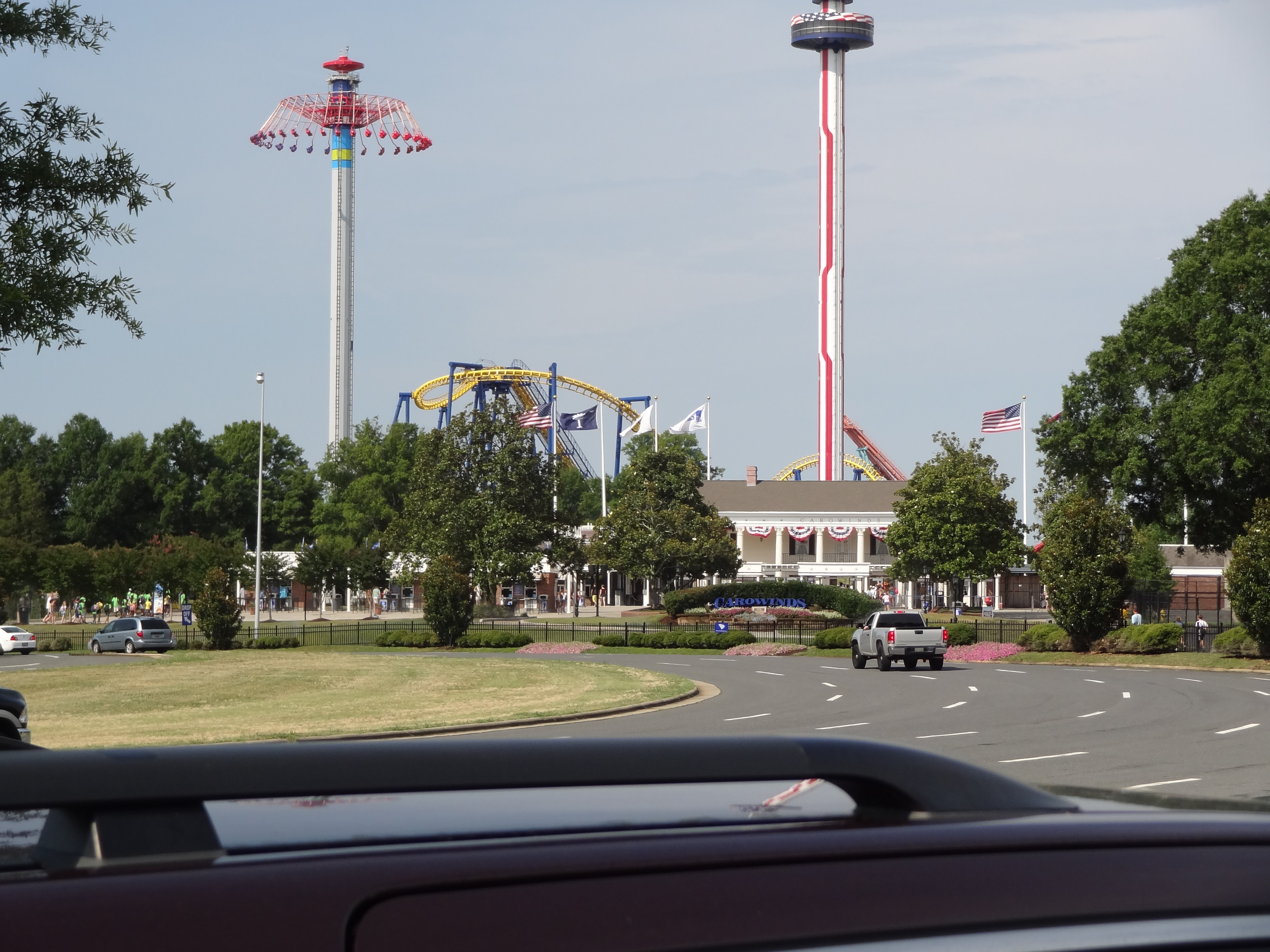
The Carolina SkyTower (right), also known as the Carowinds Tower, contributed to the crash of Flight 212

=== Pilot error ===
The investigation noted that the extraneous discussions that took place after the second bend directly contributed to the crash. When the aircraft descended beyond the prescribed minimum altitude, the crew should have arrested their descent until they reached the airport's FAF, where they would be cleared to land after receiving visual contact with Runway 36. The sequence started when Reeves first noticed the Carolina Skytower and involved Daniels in a discussion about it. With both men's attention diverted outside the cockpit, they failed to monitor their instruments and did not realize that the aircraft had descended past the minimum altitude of 1,800 feet while 1.5 nautical miles short of the runway. As the non-flying pilot, Reeves should have monitored the instruments and issued callouts to Daniels, but he failed to do so and Daniels was unaware of their low altitude.

Investigators theorized that the pilots may have misread the aircraft's altimeters. A post-crash interview with Daniels revealed that he had believed that he was flying higher than the actual altitude and thought that there were still several thousand feet available between the aircraft and the ground. This might have been caused by the setting and design of the altimeter itself. The altimeters had been set by Eastern Air Lines according to the aircraft's height above the runway. Therefore, the indicated altitude should have been 1,074 feet. However, Daniels thought that the aircraft was flying at an altitude near 1,800 feet. The design of the altimeter's drum-type pointers may have caused the pilots to misread the altitude, as the indicators for thousands and hundreds of feet were separate. As Daniels was distracted by the idle conversation, he failed to cross-reference the altitude indicated on his instrument. His altimeter showed 670 feet, but he likely believed that he was flying at an altitude of 1,670 ft.

Although the aircraft had descended past the minimum altitude, the terrain warning alarm sounded in the cockpit at 1,000 feet. However, as such alarms routinely sounded during all descents, the pilots did not interpret the alarm as a danger signal and silenced it.

=== Conclusion ===
The NTSB released its final report on May 23, 1975, concluding that the accident was caused by the flight crew's lack of altitude awareness and poor cockpit discipline. The NTSB issued the following official probable cause:

The flight crew's lack of altitude awareness at critical points during the approach due to poor cockpit discipline in that the crew did not follow prescribed procedure.

The NTSB concluded that nonessential discussion during critical phases of flight can distract pilots from their flying duties, such as instrument approach to landing, and recommended that the Federal Aviation Administration (FAA) establish rules and educate pilots to focus exclusively on flying tasks while operating at low altitudes.

The NTSB also found that the crew's persistent attempt to visually identify the Carolina Skytower, which rose to an elevation of 1,314 feet (401 m), or 340 feet (105 m) above ground level (AGL), may have further distracted and confused them. The captain's failure to announce the required altitude callouts compounded the crew's nearly total lack of altitude awareness.

== Aftermath ==
Following the crash, it was later realized that the sterile cockpit environment should also apply to takeoffs; for example, the lack of a sterile cockpit environment was a contributing factor to the crash of Air Florida Flight 90 on January 13, 1982. The FAA, after more than six years of consideration, finally published the sterile cockpit rule in 1981. The rule was to be enforced during important phases of the flight, particularly during takeoff and landing, as well as during phases when aircraft are flying below 3,000 feet.

Several family members filed lawsuits against Eastern Air Lines, demanding compensation of up to $22 million. Jurors awarded them $5 million, and the verdict was appealed by the airline, which considered the amount excessive. The airline eventually settled the lawsuits outside of court for an undisclosed amount.

The FAA revoked Daniels' pilot license. He filed an appeal in 1975, but the FAA's decision was upheld by an Atlanta judge. When he filed a second appeal in 1976, he was reinstated in 1977. Daniels never again flew for Eastern Air Lines, instead piloting chartered flights and cargo aircraft. He died in 2021 at the age of 83.

Following the crash, family members of the surviving passengers and crew members created a website to honor the disaster. On September 11, 2025, the 51st anniversary of the crash, an official memorial monument was erected in the Airport Overlook area of Charlotte Douglas International Airport.

== In popular culture ==
In September 2024, for the 50th anniversary of the crash, The Charlotte Observer produced a five-part documentary series titled 9/11/74: The Untold Story of Charlotte's Deadliest Plane Crash.

== See also ==
- 2000 Marsa Brega Short 360 crash, a similar crash in Libya in which the pilot discussed another plane system instead of focusing on the flight
- Eastern Air Lines Flight 401, another Eastern Air Lines accident caused by pilot distraction
- Avianca Flight 410, a similar crash in Colombia in which a non-crew pilot distracted the flight crew during approach
