= 2013 South Carolina's 1st congressional district special election =

- May 7, 2013

South Carolina's 1st congressional district
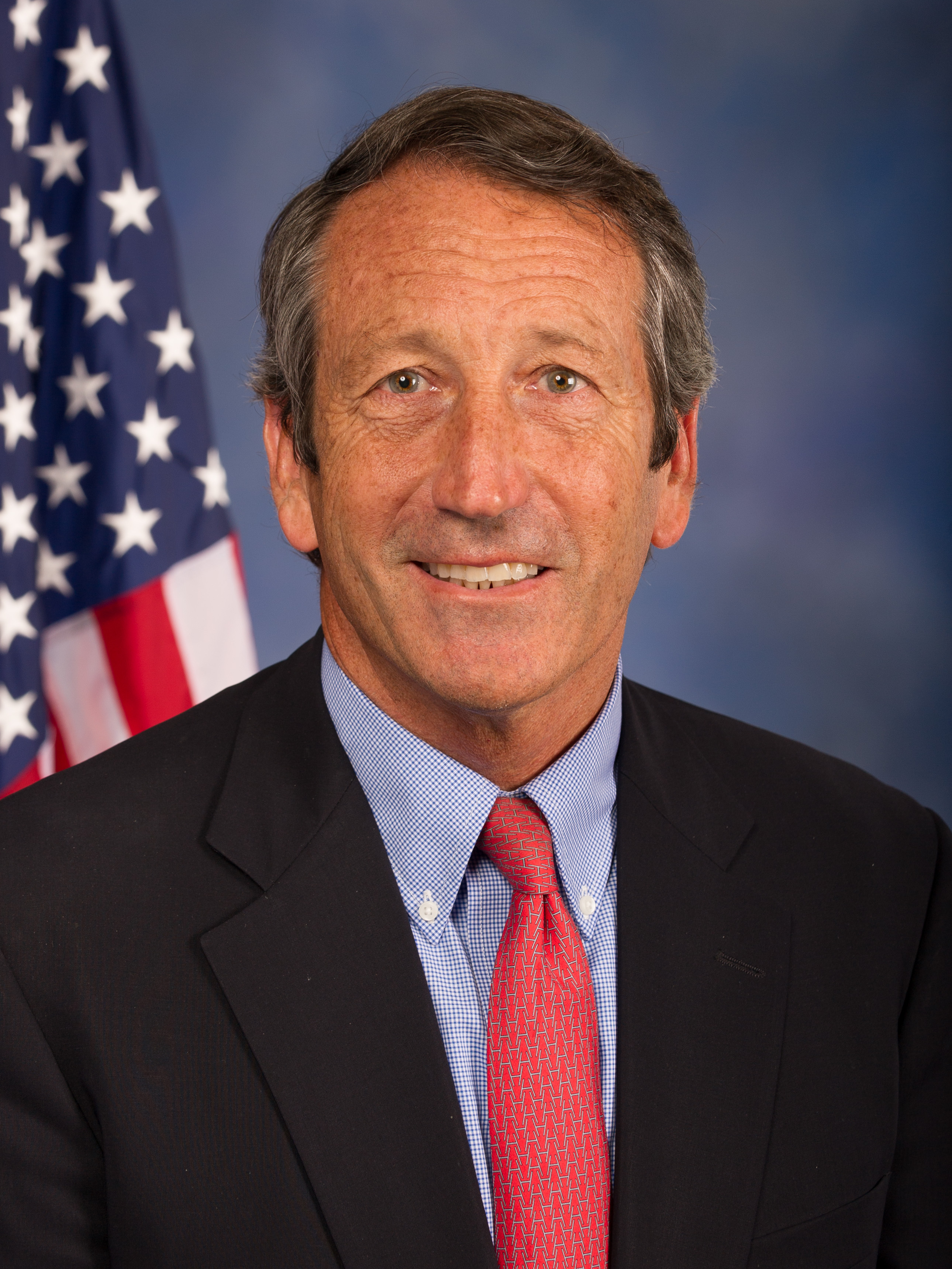

Nominee	Mark Sanford	Elizabeth Busch
Party	Republican	Democratic
Popular vote	77,600	64,961
Percentage	54.0%	45.2%
- County results Sanford: 50–60% 60–70%
U.S. Representative before election
Tim Scott
Republican
Elected U.S. Representative
Mark Sanford
Republican

A special election for South Carolina's 1st congressional district was held on May 7, 2013, to fill the seat following the resignation of U.S. Representative Tim Scott, who was appointed to the United States Senate by Governor Nikki Haley to fill the seat previously held by Jim DeMint. DeMint resigned from the Senate on January 2, 2013, to accept a position as president of The Heritage Foundation.

The filing period for candidates lasted between January 18 and January 28, 2013. The special primary elections took place on March 19, 2013. Businesswoman Elizabeth Colbert Busch won the Democratic Party primary and Mark Sanford, the former governor of South Carolina who held the seat from 1995 to 2001, advanced to a runoff with former Charleston County Councilman Curtis Bostic for the Republican Party nomination. Prior to the runoff, 14 Republicans and one Democrat signed the "Reject the Debt" pledge put out by the nonpartisan Coalition to Reduce Spending. In the runoff election on April 2, Sanford defeated Bostic. Eugene Platt, a James Island Public Service Commissioner, was nominated by the South Carolina Green Party. In the general election on May 7, Sanford received 54% of the vote, beating Colbert Busch (45%) and Platt (1%).

== Republican primary ==
=== Candidates ===
==== Declared ====
- Keith Blandford, businessman and Libertarian nominee for this district in 2012
- Curtis Bostic, former Charleston County Councilman (defeated in runoff)
- Ric Bryant, engineer
- Larry Grooms, state senator
- Jonathan Rath Hoffman, former Deputy Assistant Secretary of Homeland Security, former director of border security at the White House
- Jeff King, engineer for a military contractor
- John R. Kuhn, former state senator
- Tim Larkin, defense engineer and member of the South Carolina Army National Guard
- Chip Limehouse, state representative
- Peter M. McCoy Jr., state representative
- Elizabeth Moffly, member of the Charleston County School Board
- Ray Nash, former Dorchester County Sheriff
- Andy Patrick, state representative
- Shawn Pinkston, attorney
- Mark Sanford, former Governor of South Carolina and former U.S. Representative (won primary)
- Teddy Turner, high school teacher and son of Ted Turner

==== Declined ====
- Carroll Campbell III, businessperson and son of former governor Carroll A. Campbell, Jr.
- George E. Campsen III, state senator
- Tom Davis, state senator
- Larry Kobrovsky, former Charleston County School Board member
- Joe McKeown, chief of staff for Tim Scott and former Charleston County Councilman
- James H. Merrill, state representative
- Thomas Ravenel, former state treasurer
- Jenny Sanford, former First Lady of South Carolina
- Duffie Stone, Judicial Circuit Solicitor
- Elliott Summey, Charleston County Councilman
- Paul Thurmond, state senator

=== Primary ===
==== Results ====
2013 Republican Primary – South Carolina's 1st Congressional District Special Election
Party	Candidate	Votes	%
Republican	Mark Sanford	19,854	36.91%
Republican	Curtis Bostic	7,168	13.33%
Republican	Larry Grooms	6,673	12.40%
Republican	Teddy Turner	4,252	7.90%
Republican	Andy Patrick	3,783	7.03%
Republican	John Kuhn	3,479	6.47%
Republican	Chip Limehouse	3,279	6.10%
Republican	Ray Nash	2,508	4.66%
Republican	Peter McCoy	867	1.61%
Republican	Elizabeth Moffly	530	0.99%
Republican	Tim Larkin	393	0.73%
Republican	Jonathan Hoffman	360	0.67%
Republican	Jeff King	211	0.39%
Republican	Keith Blandford	195	0.36%
Republican	Shawn Pinkston	154	0.29%
Republican	Ric Bryant	87	0.16%
Total votes		53,793	100%

=== Runoff ===
==== Polling ====
Poll source	Date(s) administered	Sample size	Margin of error	Curtis Bostic	Mark Sanford	Other	Undecided
Public Policy Polling	March 22–24, 2013	648	± 3.9%	40%	53%	—	7%

==== Results ====
2013 Republican Primary Runoff – South Carolina's 1st Congressional District Special Election
Party	Candidate	Votes	%
Republican	Mark Sanford	26,127	56.59%
Republican	Curtis Bostic	20,044	43.41%
Total votes		46,171	100%

== Democratic primary ==
=== Candidates ===
==== Declared ====
- Elizabeth Colbert Busch, director of business development at Clemson University’s Restoration Institute, (won primary; also nominated by the South Carolina Working Families Party)
- Ben Frasier, perennial candidate, former aide to Congressman L. Mendel Rivers

==== Withdrawn ====
- Bobbie Rose, former teacher and nominee for the 1st district in 2012
- Martin Skelly, businessperson

==== Declined ====
- Robert Burton, pilot and retired Air Force Colonel
- Wendell Gilliard, state representative
- Blaine Lotz, Chairman of the Beaufort County Democratic Party
- Leon Stavrinakis, state representative

=== Primary ===
==== Results ====
2013 Democratic Primary – South Carolina's 1st Congressional District Special Election
Party	Candidate	Votes	%	±%
Democratic	Elizabeth Colbert Busch	15,802	95.86%	N/A
Democratic	Ben Frasier	682	4.14%	N/A

== Green Party ==
=== On the Ballot ===
- Eugene Platt, James Island Public Service Commissioner and 1990 Democratic Party candidate for the 1st district (won primary)

=== Declared ===
- Larry Carter Center, political activist

== General election ==
On May 7, 2013, Mark Sanford won the election and took the seat vacated by U.S. Representative Tim Scott.

=== Polling ===
Poll source	Date(s) administered	Sample size	Margin of error	Mark Sanford (R)	Elizabeth Colbert Busch (D)	Eugene Platt (G)	Undecided
Public Policy Polling	May 4–5, 2013	1,239	± 2.8%	47%	46%	4%	4%
RRH/PMI Polling	April 29 – May 1, 2013	650	± 5%	46%	46%	—	8%
Public Policy Polling	April 19–21, 2013	796	± 3.5%	41%	50%	3%	5%
Lake Research Partners (D–Colbert–Busch)	March 25–27, 2013	500	± 4.4%	44%	47%	—	7%
Public Policy Polling	March 22–24, 2013	1,175	± 2.9%	45%	47%	—	8%

Hypothetical polling

Poll source	Date(s) administered	Sample size	Margin of error	Curtis Bostic (R)	Elizabeth Colbert Busch (D)	Eugene Platt (G)	Other	Undecided
Lake Research Partners^	March 25–27, 2013	500	± 4.4%	39%	48%	—	—	10%
Public Policy Polling	March 22–24, 2013	1,175	± 2.9%	43%	43%	—	—	14%

=== Results ===
South Carolina's 1st congressional district, 2013 (special)
Party	Candidate	Votes	%	±%
Republican	Mark Sanford	77,600	54.03%	−8.00%
Democratic	Elizabeth Colbert Busch	64,961	45.22%	+9.51%
Green	Eugene Platt	690	0.48%	N/A
Write-in		384	0.27%	+0.20%
Total votes		143,635	100.00%	N/A
Republican hold				

=== County results ===
Vote breakdown by county
	Mark Sanford Republican		Elizabeth Colbert Busch Democrat		Total
County	Votes	%	Votes	%	Votes
Beaufort	17,896	52.60%	14,871	43.71%	34,020
Berkeley	15,137	60.90%	8,670	34.88%	24,856
Charleston	32,019	50.18%	29,056	45.54%	63,809
Colleton	272	69.21%	109	27.74%	393
Dorchester	12,276	59.72%	7,440	36.19%	20,557
