= Phil P. Leventis =

American politician

Member of the South Carolina Senate from the 35th district
- In office 1980-2012
- Preceded by: Edward Eli Saleeby
- Succeeded by: Thomas McElveen

Personal details
- Born: November 3, 1945 (age 80) Lexington County, South Carolina, U.S.
- Party: Democratic
- Spouse: Ellen
- Profession: President and General Manager, Dixie Beverage Company

Military service
- Branch/service: United States Air Force, South Carolina Air National Guard
- Years of service: 1969-1999
- Rank: Brigadier General
- Battles/wars: Gulf War

Phil P. Leventis is a former member of the South Carolina Senate who represented the 35th District from 1980 to 2012. He is a member of the Democratic Party.

== Early life, education and career ==
Born in Lexington County, South Carolina, Leventis graduated from the University of Virginia in 1969. He then received his commission as second lieutenant from the United States Air Force. He then became an air force pilot. Leventis retired from the South Carolina Air National Guard as Assistant Adjutant General for Air in 1999 after 30 years of service. During his service he amassed more than 3,600 hours of flying time, mostly in the F-102, A-7, and F-16, and flew 21 combat missions over Kuwait and Iraq during Operation Desert Storm. His grade upon retirement, Brigadier General, was federally recognized in March 1998.

== Political career ==
=== South Carolina Senate ===
Leventis was elected to Senate District 35, a new district created during the 1980 redistricting process. It included portions of Lee County previously represented by Senator Edward Eli Saleeby. He remained Senator until 2012, when he opted not to run for re-election.

=== 2002 Lieutenant Governor race ===
Leventis won the Democratic nomination for Lieutenant Governor and ran in the 2002 South Carolina gubernatorial election with incumbent Governor Jim Hodges. Hodges and Leventis were defeated in the general election by Republican gubernatorial nominee Mark Sanford and lieutenant governor nominee Andre Bauer.

=== 2022 School board race ===
In 2022, Leventis was among thirteen candidates to file for a new Sumter School District seat. He was defeated in a runoff by Jeff Zell.

=== 2025 School board race ===
In 2025, Leventis again filed for Sumter School District seat 8, after the seat held by Jeff Zell was vacated when Zell defeated incumbent Kevin L. Johnson in the State Senate 2024 race. Leventis faced Keith Schultz in a runoff, and defeated him to win the seat on February 25, 2025.

Party political offices
Preceded by Nick Theodore	Democratic nominee for Lieutenant Governor of South Carolina; 2002	Succeeded by Robert A. Barber Jr.
