= Harvin =

Harvin is a surname. Notable people with the surname include:

- Alex Harvin (1950–2005), American attorney and politician
- Allen Harvin (born 1959), American football player
- Cathy Harvin (1953–2010), American politician
- Earl Harvin, American drummer, percussionist and multi-instrumentalist
- Percy Harvin (born 1988), American football player
- Pressley Harvin III (born 1998), American football player
