= Augusta Law School =

Former American institution of legal education

Augusta Law School was two law schools in Augusta, Georgia which operated from 1833 to 1854 and from 1947 into the 1980s.

== History ==
Augusta Law School was first established in Augusta, Georgia in 1833. It was the first law school in Georgia and in the Deep South. It was modeled after the influential Litchfield Law School, and was founded by William Tracy Gould, a graduate of Litchfield and the son of its director, James Gould. The law school closed in 1854.

A second Augusta Law School opened in Augusta, Georgia on December 7, 1947. W. K. Miller was its dean. It operated into the 1980s. It had a chapter of Sigma Delta Kappa law fraternity.

== Notable alumni ==
- Clement A. Evans, senior officer of the Confederate States Army, minister, and soldier
- Bull Fulcher, head football coach of the Georgia Institute of Technology
- Alex Harvin, member of the South Carolina House of Representatives
- David J. Swann, member of the Georgia House of Representatives

== See also ==
- List of defunct law schools in the United States
