= Edward Gould =

Edward Gould may refer to:

- Edward Gould (golfer) (1874-1937), American golfer
- Edward Wyatt Gould (1879–1960), Welsh rugby union player and Olympic athlete
- Edward Blencowe Gould (1847–1916), British Consul in Bangkok, Thailand
- Edward Sherman Gould (1808–1885), United States author and critic
- Edd Gould (1988–2012), British animator

== See also ==
- Eddie Gould, character in Underbelly: The Golden Mile
