= Glenn F. McConnell =

American politician (born 1947)

Glenn McConnell
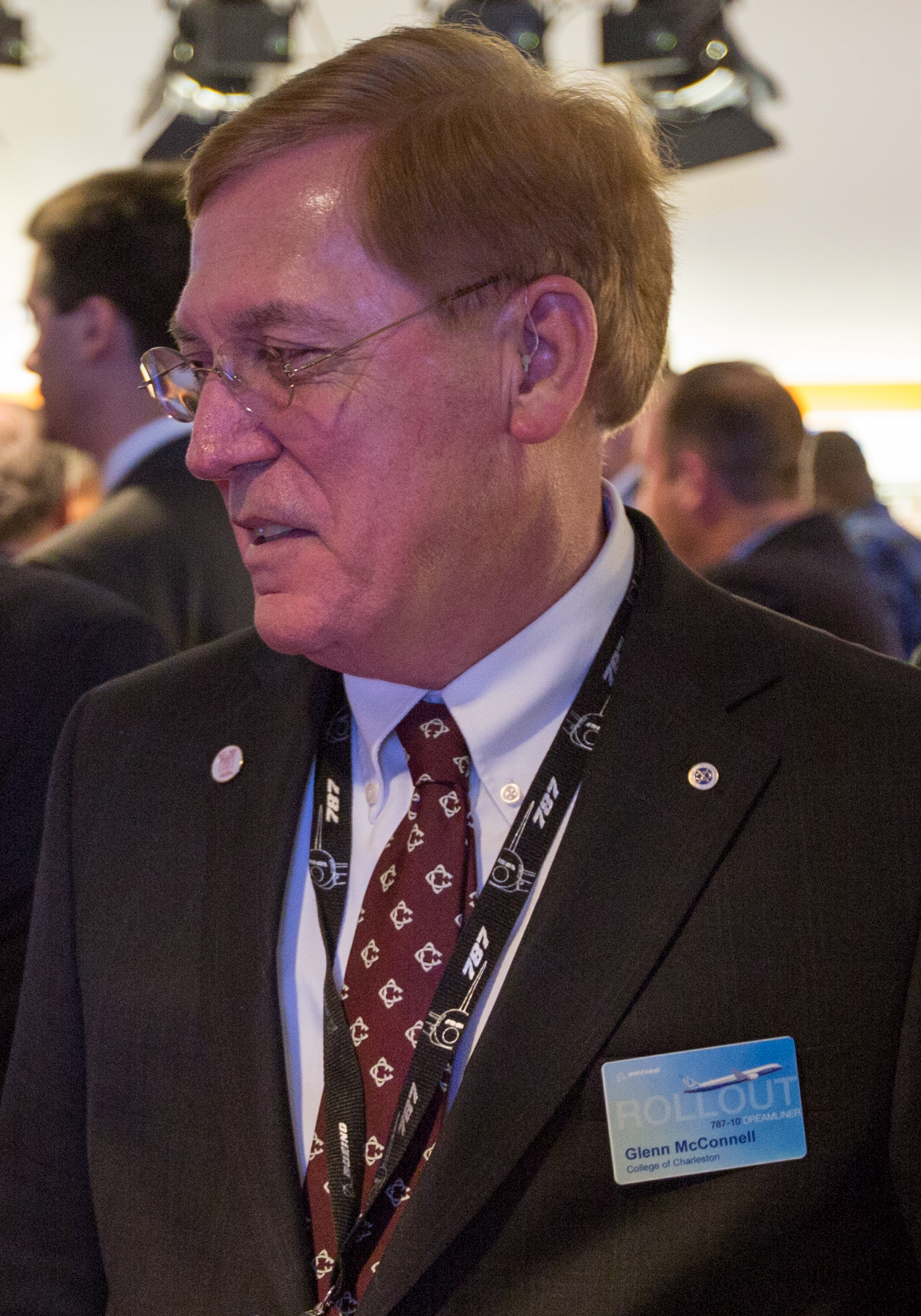

22nd President of the College of Charleston
- In office July 1, 2014 – July 2, 2018
- Preceded by: P. George Benson
- Succeeded by: Andrew Hsu

89th Lieutenant Governor of South Carolina
- In office March 13, 2012 – June 18, 2014
- Governor: Nikki Haley
- Preceded by: Ken Ard
- Succeeded by: Yancey McGill

President pro tempore of the South Carolina Senate
- In office January 3, 2001 – March 13, 2012
- Preceded by: John W. Drummond
- Succeeded by: John E. Courson

Member of the South Carolina Senate from the 41st district
- In office January 3, 1981 – March 13, 2012
- Succeeded by: Walter Hundley

Personal details
- Born: December 11, 1947 (age 78) Charleston, South Carolina, U.S.
- Party: Republican
- Education: College of Charleston (BA); University of South Carolina School of Law (JD)

Glenn Fant McConnell (born December 11, 1947) is an American politician from South Carolina. He was a member of the South Carolina Senate, representing the 41st District from 1981 to March 13, 2012. He ascended to the office of lieutenant governor on March 13, 2012 because he was the Senate President Pro Tempore. He served as the 89th lieutenant governor of South Carolina from 2012 until June 18, 2014. The office of lieutenant governor had become vacant because of the resignation of Ken Ard on March 9, 2012 due to his indictment by a state Grand Jury for ethics violations.

On March 22, 2014, he was chosen as the 22nd president of the College of Charleston, a selection which was criticized by some of the students, faculty, and community due to his support for the Confederate flag and a widely circulated photo of him dressed as a Confederate general. He served as the president of the College of Charleston from 2014 to 2018.

== Early life, education, and early career ==
McConnell was born in 1947 in Charleston, South Carolina, to the late Samuel W. McConnell and the late Evelyn McDaniel McConnell. He is a lifelong resident of the city and graduated from St Paul's High School in 1965. He attended the College of Charleston. While there, he was active in the Alpha chapter of the Pi Kappa Phi fraternity, served in student government, and was elected president of the student body. He graduated with a B.S. in 1969 and a J.D. from University of South Carolina School of Law in 1972.

He first served as a staff attorney with the Charleston City Legal Assistance Program. He became a Labor Management Relations Specialist with the Charleston Naval Shipyard and afterwards went into private practice. He retired from law to manage his family business, CSA Galleries. This business operated for over 20 years and was known to specialize in Civil War memorabilia. He is also a Co-Owner of The Wild House LTD.

He is a member of the Episcopal Church of the Holy Communion in Charleston.

== Early political career ==
McConnell served as chairman for the county Republican Party from 1978 to 1982. He was a delegate at the Republican National Convention in 1980, 1984, and 1988.

== South Carolina Senate (1981-2012) ==
=== Elections ===
He was first elected to South Carolina's 41st Senate District in 1980, and was re-elected every four years until his last re-election in 2008. He was rarely challenged by a Democrat.

=== Tenure ===
McConnell was the Senate President Pro Tempore from 2001 to 2012. During Mark Sanford's administration, McConnell, alongside Hugh Leatherman and Bobby Harrell effectively controlled state policy. In 2007, he sponsored the Base Load Review Act, which ultimately resulted in the Nukegate scandal a decade later. McConnell was one of several South Carolina politicians credited with playing a key role in getting Boeing to announce plans to build a Boeing 787 assembly plant in North Charleston in October 2009. The incentives package offered to Boeing was valued at $470 million.

Confederate flag

McConnell is a member of the Sons of Confederate Veterans, Secession Camp #4. The Sons of Confederate Veterans were charged in 1906 by Lt. General Stephen Dill Lee, Commander General of the United Confederate Veterans, with "the vindication of the cause for which we fought."

During a 1999 appearance on ABC News' Nightline, then-Senator McConnell made the following statements about the flag:

- I see honor, courage, valor. I see the red, white and blue and the blood of sacrifice that ran through that battle and the people that carried that flag. I don't see black and white. I don't see racism.
- It hurts us to see groups like the Klan holding that flag. You want to talk about a sick feeling? Our group, our historical groups, we are disgusted when we see it. But we're equally disgusted and sickened by the political rhetoric and people say it's an emblem of racism, it's an emblem of hate, it's shameful and all of this. How do they think we feel when it's the emblem of our ancestors? They hurt our feelings.
- We will teach generations to come about the honor of these people and if they are going to choose the road of trying to stereotype us as racists and as hate mongers, then we are forever divided.

In 2000, when the Confederate flag was brought down from atop the dome of the State House, Senator McConnell successfully advocated for flying another Confederate flag from a flagpole in the front of the Statehouse, on the grounds, near the Confederate Soldier Monument. He rejected the suggestion that the Confederate flag be placed in a glass case by saying, "Encasement represents entombment," and by saying that he wanted "no part in symbolically burying the Confederate banner." The resulting bill that was passed in 2000 was called a compromise.

After the 2015 shooting at a historically black church, McConnell condemned the shooter's motives, in which he said that he does not represent the Confederate flag or the South. He also supported the decision of Governor Nikki Haley to remove the Confederate flag from the South Carolina State House.

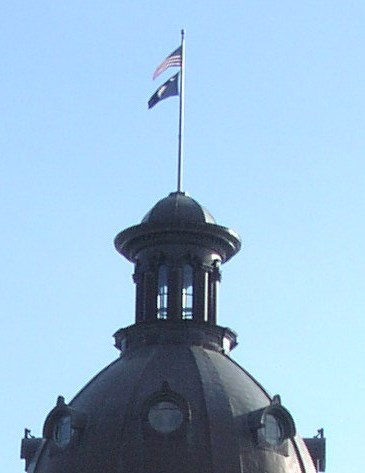
Flags Atop the Dome, 2008

Confederate Flag Behind Confederate Soldier Monument, 2008

=== Committee assignments ===
- Senate Rules Committee (previous chairman)
- Senate Judiciary Committee (chairman)
- Senate Banking and Insurance Committee
- Senate Ethics Committee
- Senate Interstate Cooperation Committee
- Senate Labor, Commerce, and Industry Committee

== Lieutenant governor (2012–14) ==
Incumbent Republican Lieutenant Governor Ken Ard resigned his position in March 2012 because of ethics violations. At that time, the State Senate President Pro Tempore, became the lieutenant governor when the position became vacant, leading to McConnell resigning his senate seat to become the lieutenant governor.

== Presidency of the College of Charleston ==
On June 18, 2014, McConnell resigned his position as lieutenant governor to become president of the College of Charleston on July 1, 2014. McConnell assumed the presidency of his alma mater in July 2014. He is a former student body president at the College of Charleston, where he earned his undergraduate B.S. degree in political science in 1969. He has an Honorary Doctorate of Humane Letters from the College of Charleston as well as other honorary degrees.

In 2016, following reports of sexual assault, McConnell temporarily banned alcohol from Greek activities. He also oversaw the implementation of the Collegiate Recovery Program, an initiative that supported students in recovery from addiction. In the Summer of 2016, the College of Charleston stopped considering race a factor in student enrollment.

On January 29, 2018, McConnell announced his retirement from the College of Charleston citing health issues.

Political offices
| Preceded by John Drummond | President pro tempore of the South Carolina Senate; 2001–2012 | Succeeded by John Courson |
| Preceded by Ken Ard | Lieutenant Governor of South Carolina; 2012–2014 | Succeeded by J. Yancey McGill |
