= Bob Peeler =

American politician

86th Lieutenant Governor of South Carolina
- In office January 11, 1995 – January 15, 2003
- Governor: David Beasley; Jim Hodges
- Preceded by: Nick Theodore
- Succeeded by: André Bauer

Personal details
- Born: January 4, 1952 (age 74) Gaffney, South Carolina, U.S.
- Party: Republican
- Spouse: Donna Hoefer Peeler
- Children: Caroline, Robert and Hunter
- Occupation: Businessman

Robert Lee Peeler (born January 4, 1952) is an American former politician from the state of South Carolina. He served as the 86th lieutenant governor of South Carolina from January 1995 to January 2003. He was the first Republican lieutenant governor of South Carolina since Richard Howell Gleaves served during the Reconstruction era.

== Career ==
Peeler was educated at Limestone College.

In 2002, Peeler ran for governor and was beaten in the primary race runoff by Mark Sanford.

He currently serves on the Clemson University Board of Trustees. Peeler, a 1991 graduate of the school, was elected to the board in 2003. Peeler is currently a manager of Community and Municipal Relations for Waste Management Inc. in Lexington, South Carolina. His family runs a milk industry in Gaffney, South Carolina, and his older brother, Harvey S. Peeler Jr., is a state senator.

Party political offices
| Preceded by Henry McMaster | Republican nominee for Lieutenant Governor of South Carolina; 1994, 1998 | Succeeded by André Bauer |
Political offices
| Preceded by Nick Theodore | Lieutenant Governor of South Carolina; 1995–2003 | Succeeded by André Bauer |
