= TSA Office of Inspection Accountability Act of 2014 =

- Long title: To require the Transportation Security Administration to conform to existing Federal law and regulations regarding criminal investigator positions, and for other purposes.
- Announced in: the 113th United States Congress
- Sponsored by: Rep. Mark Sanford (R-SC)
- Number of co-sponsors: 1

Codification
- U.S.C. sections affected: 5 U.S.C. § 5545a, 5 U.S.C. § 8331, 5 U.S.C. § 8401
- Agencies affected: Transportation Security Administration, Department of Homeland Security Office of Inspector General, United States Congress, Department of Homeland Security

Legislative history
- Introduced in the House as H.R. 4803 by Rep. Mark Sanford (R-SC) on June 5, 2014; Committee consideration by United States House Committee on Homeland Security, United States House Homeland Security Subcommittee on Transportation Security

The TSA Office of Inspection Accountability Act of 2014 (H.R. 4803) is a bill that would direct the Inspector General of the Department of Homeland Security (DHS) to review the data and methods that the Transportation Security Administration (TSA) uses to classify personnel as law enforcement officers and to reclassify, as necessary, any staff of the Office of Inspection that are currently misclassified according to the results of that review. The TSA would be required to adhere to existing federal law about what positions are classified as criminal investigators, a fact that determines pay and benefits.

The bill was introduced into the United States House of Representatives during the 113th United States Congress.

== Background ==
Government employees who are classified as law enforcement personnel qualify for Law Enforcement Availability Pay (LEAP) as well as extra retirement benefits. Employees receiving LEAP pay are compensated "at 25 percent above their base pay for two extra hours per day" and are "also eligible to retire sooner and receive more generous annuities from their pensions."

== Provisions of the bill ==
This summary is based largely on the summary provided by the Congressional Research Service, a public domain source.

The TSA Office of Inspection Accountability Act of 2014 would, in section four, direct the Inspector General of the Department of Homeland Security (DHS) to: (1) analyze the data and methods that the Assistant Secretary of Homeland Security (Transportation Security) uses to identify Transportation Security Administration (TSA) law enforcement officer and criminal investigators; and (2) provide relevant findings to the Assistant Secretary, including regarding whether the data and methods are adequate and valid.

The bill would prohibit the TSA from hiring any new employee to work in its Office of Inspection if the Inspector General finds that such data and methods are inadequate or invalid, until: (1) the Assistant Secretary makes a certification to the House Committee on Homeland Security and the Senate Committee on Commerce, Science, and Transportation that only TSA employees who meet such requirements are classified as criminal investigators and are receiving premium pay and other benefits associated with such classification; and (2) the Inspector General submits a finding that the Assistant Secretary utilized adequate and valid data and methods to make such certification.

Section five would direct the Assistant Secretary to: (1) reclassify criminal investigator positions in the Office of Inspection as noncriminal investigator positions or non-law enforcement positions if the individuals in those positions do not, or are not expected to, spend an average of at least 50% of their time performing criminal investigative duties; and (2) estimate the total long-term cost savings to the federal government resulting from such reclassification and provide such estimate to such committees. Requires such estimate to identify savings associated with the positions reclassified, including savings from: law enforcement training, early retirement benefits, law enforcement availability pay, weapons, vehicles, and communications devices.

Section six would direct the Assistant Secretary to submit to such committees: (1) any materials in the possession or control of DHS associated with the Office of Inspection's review of the use of a federal firearms license by Federal Air Marshal Service officials to obtain discounted or free firearms for personal use; and (2) information on specific actions that will be taken to prevent Service officials from using a federal firearms license, or exploiting the Service's relationships with private vendors, to obtain discounted or free firearms for personal use.

== Congressional Budget Office report ==
This summary is based largely on the summary provided by the Congressional Budget Office, as ordered reported by the House Committee on Homeland Security on June 11, 2014. This is a public domain source.

The Office of Inspection in the Transportation Security Administration (TSA) is responsible for ensuring the effectiveness and efficiency of TSA’s operations and identifying vulnerabilities in the agency’s security systems. In carrying out its mission, the office conducts internal inspections, investigations, and covert tests to assess the integrity of the agency’s activities and its staff. Under current law, roughly half of the office’s employees are classified as criminal investigators and are eligible for certain statutory employment benefits because they are considered law enforcement officers. In particular, such individuals qualify for additional compensation (known as Law Enforcement Availability Pay) and enhanced retirement benefits.

H.R. 4803 would direct the Inspector General of the Department of Homeland Security (DHS) to review the data and methods that the TSA uses to classify personnel as law enforcement officers and to reclassify, as necessary, any staff of the Office of Inspection that are currently misclassified according to the results of that review. The bill would require DHS to provide various security-related updates and reports to the Congress.

Based on information from DHS, the Congressional Budget Office (CBO) estimates that implementing H.R. 4803 would have no significant effect on federal spending. According to DHS, TSA is already undertaking an analysis of the agency’s workforce that will serve as the basis for potential reclassifications of personnel who do not meet criteria to be considered law enforcement officers, and CBO does not expect that enacting H.R. 4803 would significantly affect the timing or outcome of that process. We estimate that complying with the bill’s reporting requirements would cost less than $500,000, assuming the availability of appropriated funds. H.R. 4803 would not affect direct spending or revenues; therefore, pay-as-you-go procedures do not apply.

H.R. 4803 contains no intergovernmental or private-sector mandates as defined in the Unfunded Mandates Reform Act and would impose no costs on state, local, or tribal governments.

== Procedural history ==
The TSA Office of Inspection Accountability Act of 2014 was introduced into the United States House of Representatives on June 5, 2014 by Rep. Mark Sanford (R-SC). It was referred to the United States House Committee on Homeland Security and the United States House Homeland Security Subcommittee on Transportation Security. The bill was reported (amended) alongside House Report 113-513 on July 3, 2014. On July 22, 2014, the House voted to pass the bill in a voice vote.

== Debate and discussion ==
Rep. Michael McCaul (R-TX) supported the bill, saying "the Department of Homeland Security Inspector General has also found that TSA’s misclassification of some employees is wasting taxpayers' dollars and the TSA Office of Inspection Accountability Act ensures employee workload matches position and pay within the Office of Inspection."

Bill sponsor Rep. Sanford said that "even though there are federal standards in place that lay out how employees qualify for higher wages, the Transportation Security Administration pays some of their employees more for jobs they're not doing. That wouldn't make sense anywhere outside of government and our bill would help fix that problem by clarifying those employees' responsibilities." According to Sanford, accurately reclassifying employees who do not spent at least 50 percent of the time on law enforcement activities and putting them on an accurate pay scale would save the government $17 million a year.

== See also ==
- List of bills in the 113th United States Congress
