= Ken Ard (politician) =

American convicted state politician

Lieutenant Governor of South Carolina
- In office January 12, 2011 – March 9, 2012
- Governor: Nikki Haley
- Preceded by: André Bauer
- Succeeded by: Glenn F. McConnell

Personal details
- Born: December 18, 1963 (age 62) Pamplico, South Carolina, U.S.
- Party: Republican
- Spouse: Tammy Ard
- Children: 3
- Education: Wofford College (attended)

James Kenneth Ard (born December 18, 1963) is an American politician who served as the 88th lieutenant governor of South Carolina from January 12, 2011 to March 9, 2012.

== Early life and education ==
Ard was born in Pamplico, South Carolina. The son of Jimmy and Margie Ard, he graduated from Hannah Pamplico High School. He attended Wofford College, but did not earn a degree.

== Career ==
He began working for the family business, Double A Body Builders, while still in high school. The company designs, manufactures and installs custom-built truck bodies. Ard sold his interest in the company to his brother in 2008, in order to more fully dedicate his time to public service.

Ard was elected to the Florence County Council in 2004. He was elected chairman of the Florence County Republican Party in 2009.

=== Lieutenant governor of South Carolina ===
South Carolina's previous lieutenant governor, Andre Bauer, ran for governor in 2010, leaving an open race for lieutenant governor. Ard finished first against three other candidates in the Republican primary and ultimately emerged victorious as the Republican nominee for lieutenant governor.

In the general election, Ard faced Democrat Ashley Cooper. Ard won the election, with 55% to Cooper's 45%, and was sworn in as the 88th Lieutenant Governor of South Carolina on January 12, 2011.

As Lieutenant Governor, he served as President of the South Carolina Senate and oversaw South Carolina's Office on Aging.

==== Campaign finance conviction and resignation from office ====
Ard was a rising star within the South Carolina Republican Party before ethics investigations caused his political career to collapse. In 2012, the State Ethics Commission charged him with 69 counts of using campaign money for personal use and 23 counts of failing to disclose campaign expenses during the 2010 election for lieutenant governor. In June 2012, Ard settled the civil ethics charges relating to the 2010 campaign by paying a $48,400 civil penalty for 106 ethics violations and reimbursing his campaign slightly over $12,000.

Following the Ethics Commission investigation, a state grand jury indicted Ard on "seven counts of ethics violations over his mishandling of money during that 2010 race, including converting campaign funds for tickets to the SEC championship football game in Atlanta, buying clothes and a flat-screen TV and having a confidant dole out $100 bills from a paper bag." On March 10, 2012, Ard was indicted, pleaded guilty, resigned from office, and sentenced all on the same day, an arrangement worked out by the Attorney General's Office, South Carolina State Law Enforcement Division, and Ard's team of five criminal defense lawyers. Circuit Court Judge G. Thomas Cooper Jr. sentenced Ard to five years of probation, a $5,000 fine and 300 hours of community service.

=== Later clear ===
Five months after pleading guilty and resigning as lieutenant governor, Ard became a talk radio show host on WFRK (95.3 FM) in Florence, South Carolina. The Post & Courier described Ard as "a libertarian-leaning conservative with a mix of other strains of thought who's not afraid to say whatever comes to his mind" and that his show gained local popularity.

== Personal life ==
Ken is married to his wife, Tammy. They have three children. They are members of Southside Baptist Church in Florence, South Carolina.

Party political offices
Preceded by André Bauer	Republican nominee for Lieutenant Governor of South Carolina; 2010	Succeeded by Henry McMaster
Political offices
Preceded by André Bauer	Lieutenant Governor of South Carolina; 2011–2012	Succeeded by Glenn F. McConnell
