= Clement A. Evans =

American minister, soldier, and author

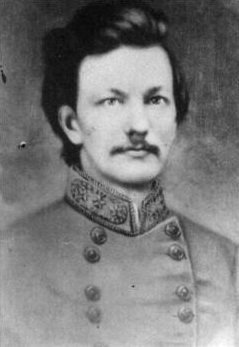
- Evans, c. 1864
- Born: Clement Anselm Evans; February 25, 1833; Stewart County, Georgia, U.S.
- Died: July 2, 1911 (aged 78); Atlanta, Georgia, U.S.
- Burial place: Oakland Cemetery, Atlanta, Georgia, U.S.
- Education: Augusta Law School
- Spouse: Mary Allen Walton (m. 1854)
- Children: 8
- Military career
- Allegiance: United States; Confederate States
- Service: Confederate States Army
- Service years: 1861–1865
- Rank: Brigadier general
- Commands: Gordon's Division, Second Corps, Army of Northern Virginia
- Conflicts: See list: American Civil War; Seven Days Battle; Second Battle of Bull Run; Battle of Antietam; Battle of Fredericksburg; Battle of Gettysburg; Battle of the Wilderness; Battle of Monocacy (WIA); Siege of Petersburg; Appomattox Campaign

Brigadier-General Clement Anselm Evans (February 25, 1833 – July 2, 1911) was a senior officer of the Confederate States Army who commanded infantry in the Eastern Theater of the American Civil War. Afterwards, he edited a 12-volume work on Confederate military history, so named, in 1899.

== Early life and education ==
Clement Anselm Evans was born in Stewart County, Georgia. In 1854 Evans married Mary Allen "Allie" Walton whose marriage brought eight children, three of whom died in infancy. He studied at the Augusta Law School in Augusta, Georgia, and was admitted to the bar at the age of 18. By the age of 21, he was a county judge, and a state senator at the age of 25. With the election of U.S. President Abraham Lincoln in 1860, Evans organized a company of militia.

== American Civil War ==
Evans was commissioned as major of the 31st Georgia Infantry on November 19, 1861, and was promoted to colonel on May 13, 1862, fighting in the Seven Days Battles, Second Manassas, and Antietam. He had temporary command of Alexander Lawton's Georgia brigade from September until November 1862, seeing additional action at Fredericksburg. During the Gettysburg campaign and the 1864 fighting at the Wilderness and Spotsylvania, Evans again commanded the 31st Georgia while John Brown Gordon commanded the brigade.

Evans was promoted to brigadier general in May 1864 (replacing Gordon who ascended to division command) and was wounded at Monocacy. He commanded Gordon's Division, Second Corps, Army of Northern Virginia, from Petersburg to Appomattox. Evans survived five wounds during the war.

== Later life and legacy ==
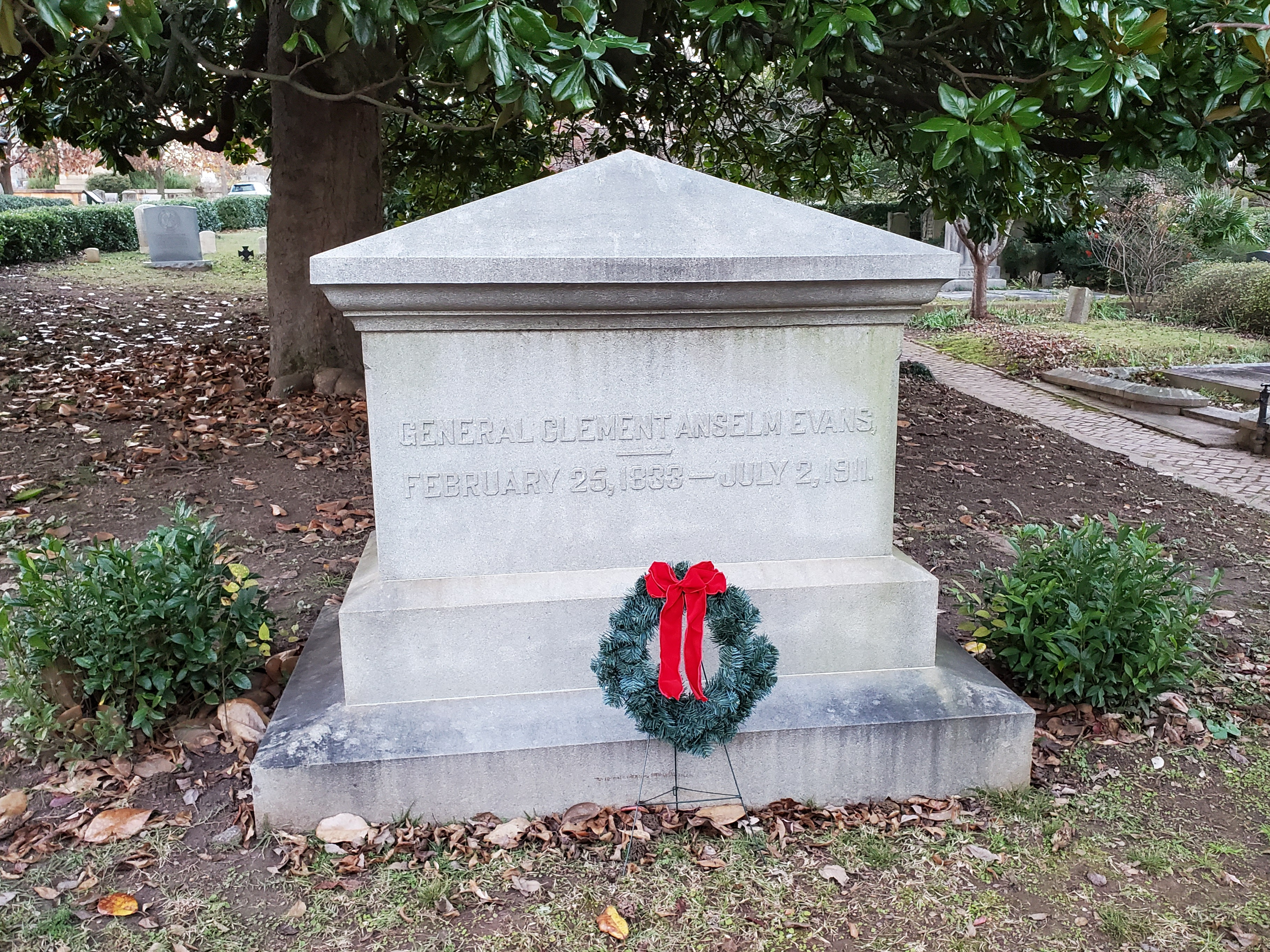
Evans's grave at Oakland Cemetery

After the war ended, he became an influential Methodist minister, advancing the “holiness movement,” a controversial doctrine that eventually split the denomination. He pastored churches in the Atlanta area, some with memberships as large as 1,000, until his retirement in 1892. Three years later, Evans authored the Military History of Georgia, heavily based upon his Civil War memoirs. He then edited and co-wrote the Confederate Military History, a 12-volume compendium, first published in 1899. Finally, he co-authored the four-volume Cyclopedia of Georgia. Regarding the war, Evans said:

If we cannot justify the South in the act of Secession, we will go down in History solely as a brave, impulsive but rash people who attempted in an illegal manner to overthrow the Union of our Country.

Evans was very active in establishing and administering fraternal veterans organizations following the war. He helped organize the Confederate Survivors Association (a regional group based in Augusta, Georgia) in 1878 and served as its first president. He was a founder of the first national Confederate veterans group, the United Confederate Veterans, in 1889 and commander of the UCV's Georgia division for 12 years.

Evans died in Atlanta on July 2, 1911: his body lay in state in the central rotunda of the capitol building while the state legislature adjourned for a day to attend his funeral. He was buried in Atlanta's Oakland Cemetery, just a few feet away from the grave of John Gordon. Evans County, Georgia (established November 3, 1914) is named after him.

== See also ==
- List of commanders-in-chief of the United Confederate Veterans
- List of Confederate States Army generals
