= Sigma Delta Kappa =

American professional law fraternity

- ΣΔΚ
- Founded: August 14, 1914; 112 years ago University of Michigan
- Type: Professional
- Former affiliation: PFA; PIC
- Status: Defunct
- Defunct date: After 2009
- Emphasis: Law
- Scope: National
- Colors: Red and Black
- Flower: Red rose
- Publication: Si-De-Ka
- Chapters: 49+
- Members: 18,350 (1977) lifetime
- Headquarters: Arlington, Virginia 22201; United States

Sigma Delta Kappa (ΣΔΚ) was an American professional fraternity in the field of law. It was founded in 1914 at the University of Michigan Law School.

== History ==
Sigma Delta Kappa was founded as a men's professional fraternity for law at the University of Michigan on August 14, 1914. It purpose was bring together members of the legal profession, to create a network of students of various law schools, friendship, and to provide professional and social aid to its members. Membership was open to men only.

Its founders were:

- Francis S. Rosenthal
- James T. Sloan
- John G. Gutekunst
- Walter E. Morris
- Russell D. Calkins
- Arthur A. Morrow

It was admitted to the Conference of Law Fraternities in 1925. The fraternity joined the Professional Interfraternity Conference in 1933. In 1950, it had sixteen active college chapters, ten alumni chapters, and 14,500 members. It was a charter member of the Professional Fraternity Association in 1978.

The fraternity had initiated 18,350 members and had 18 active chapters in 1977, with 31 inactive chapters. Its headquarters was located in Arlington, Virginia. At least one chapter was still active in 2009, but later went inactive along with the fraternity.

== Symbols ==
The Sigma Delta Kappa badge was a shield, shaped like a coffin, with the Greek letters ΣΔΚ in gold on a black background. Its coat of arms included a checkered shield with six stars arranged diagonally. Over the shield was an owl holding balance scales in its beak, surrounded by a folded weath.

The colors of Sigma Delta Kappa were red and black. Its flower was the red rose. The fraternity's publications included the quarterly Si-De-Ka, established in 1918, and a Newsletter.

== Chapters ==
The chapters of Sigma Delta Kappa as of 1977. Inactive chapters and institutions are in italics.

Chapter	Charter date and range	Institution	Location	Status	Ref.
Alpha	August 14, 1914	University of Michigan	Ann Arbor, Michigan	Inactive	
Beta	1914–1922	Chicago Law School	Chicago, Illinois	Inactive	(Note: Chicago Law School closed around 1922.)
Gamma	1915–c. 1936	Benjamin Harrison Law School	Indianapolis, Indiana	Inactive	(Note: In 1936, the Benjamin Harrison Law School and the Indiana Law School merged, taking the latter's name.)
Delta	1915–1922	Hamilton College of Law	Chicago, Illinois	Inactive	
Epsilon	1915–1922	Benton College of Law	St. Louis, Missouri	Inactive	
Zeta	1916	Valparaiso University	Valparaiso, Indiana	Inactive	
Eta	1917	University of Indianapolis	Indianapolis, Indiana	Inactive	
Theta	1917–c. 1942	Chattanooga College of Law	Chattanooga, Tennessee	Inactive	(Note: Chattanooga College of Law closed in 1942.)
Iota	1920–1926	Washington and Lee University	Lexington, Virginia	Inactive	
Kappa	1921–c. 1994	Atlanta Law School	Atlanta, Georgia	Inactive	(Note: Atlanta Law School closed in 1994.)
Lambda	1921	Detroit College of Law	Detroit, Michigan	Inactive	(Note: Detroit College of Law affiliated with Michigan State University in 1995.)
Mu	1921–c. 1954	National University School of Law	Washington, D.C.	Inactive	(Note: National University School of Law merged with George Washington University Law School in 1954.)
Nu	1921	Northwestern University	Evanston, Illinois	Inactive	
Xi	1922	University of Georgia	Athens, Georgia	Inactive	
Omicron	1922	Ohio Northern University	Ada, Ohio	Inactive	
Pi (First)	1922–1962	Cumberland University	Lebanon, Tennessee	Moved	(Note: In 1962, the assets of the Cumberland University School of Law were transferred to Howard College, now known as Samford University, in Birmingham, Alabama. The law school is now known as the Cumberland School of Law.)
Rho	1925	San Francisco Law School	San Francisco, California	Inactive	
Sigma	1925	University of Southern California	Los Angeles, California	Inactive	
Tau	1926	DePaul University	Chicago, Illinois	Inactive	
Upsilon	1926	University of Minnesota Law School	Minneapolis, Minnesota	Inactive	
Phi	1926	University of California, Hastings College of the Law	San Francisco, California	Inactive	
Chi	1926	University of Alabama	Tuscaloosa, Alabama	Inactive	
Psi	1927	St. Joseph Law	Missouri	Inactive	
Omega	1927	Chicago-Kent College of Law	Chicago, Illinois	Inactive	
Alpha Alpha	1927	University of Illinois College of Law	Champaign, Illinois	Inactive	
Alpha Beta	1927	Westminster College of Law	Denver, Colorado	Inactive	(Note: Westminster College of Law merged with the University of Denver College of Law in 1957.)
Alpha Gamma	1927	University of Mississippi School of Law	Oxford, Mississippi	Inactive	
Alpha Delta	1928	St. John's University School of Law	Jamaica, Queens, New York	Inactive	
Alpha Epsilon	1928	University of Louisville School of Law	Louisville, Kentucky	Inactive	
Alpha Zeta	1928–c. 1943	John Randolph Neal School of Law	Knoxville, Tennessee	Inactive	(Note: The John Randolph Neal School of Law closed in 1943.)
Alpha Eta	1928	Knoxville Law	Knoxville, Tennessee	Inactive	
Alpha Theta	1928	University of Tennessee	Knoxville, Tennessee	Inactive	
Alpha Iota	1929	University of Baltimore School of Law	Baltimore, Maryland	Inactive	
Alpha Kappa	1929–c. 1933	Lake Erie Law School	Cleveland, Ohio	Inactive	(Note: Lake Erie School of Law closed in 1933.)
Alpha Lambda	1929	Wake Forest University	Winston-Salem, North Carolina	Inactive	
Alpha Mu	1929	Columbus School of Law	Washington, D.C.	Inactive	
Alpha Nu	1929	Des Moines		Inactive	
Alpha Xi (First)	1930	Los Angeles Law School	Los Angeles, California	Inactive, Reassigned	
Alpha Omicron	1931	Jefferson Law School	Dallas, Texas	Inactive	(Note: The school closed in 1938.)
Alpha Pi	1932	Indiana University Maurer School of Law	Bloomington, Indiana	Inactive	
Alpha Rho	1933	Washington College of Law	Washington, D.C.	Inactive	
Alpha Sigma	1933	Thomas Goode Jones School of Law	Montgomery, Alabama	Inactive	
Alpha Tau	1933	Woodrow Wilson College of Law	Atlanta, Georgia	Inactive	
Alpha Phi	1936	Birmingham School of Law	Birmingham, Alabama	Inactive	
Alpha Chi	1938	Atlanta's John Marshall Law School	Atlanta, Georgia	Inactive	
Alpha Psi	1937	Philadelphia		Inactive	
Alpha Omega	1951	Mississippi College School of Law	Jackson, Mississippi	Inactive	(Note: The chapter was chartered at the Jackson School of Law, which was acquired by Mississippi College in 1975.)
Beta Alpha	1953	Augusta Law School	Augusta, Georgia	Inactive	
Beta Beta	1960	University of Baltimore School of Law	Baltimore, Maryland	Inactive	
Pi (Second)	1963	Cumberland School of Law	Homewood, Alabama	Inactive	
	1966	Massey Law School	Atlanta, Georgia	Inactive	
Beta Chi		University of Memphis	Memphis, Tennessee	Inactive	
Alpha Xi (Second)		Pacific Coast University School of Law	Long Beach, California	Inactive	

== See also ==
- Professional fraternities and sororities
