= Larry Blanding =

American politician

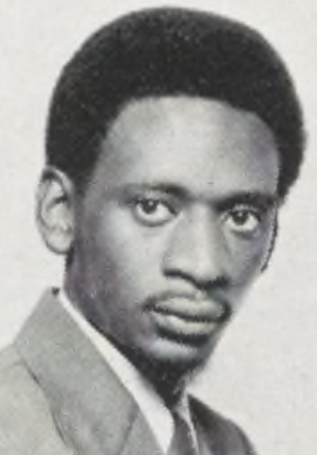
- Blanding in 1977

Member of the South Carolina House of Representatives from the 71st district
- In office 1977–1983
- Preceded by: Ernest A. Finney Jr.
- Succeeded by: Julius Murray

Member of the South Carolina House of Representatives from the 66th district
- In office 1983–1990
- Preceded by: Alex Harvin
- Succeeded by: Ralph W. Cantry

Personal details
- Born: August 29, 1953 (age 73) Sumter County, South Carolina, U.S.
- Party: Democratic
- Education: Claflin College; South Carolina State College

Larry Blanding (born August 29, 1953) is an American politician. A member of the Democratic Party, he served in the South Carolina House of Representatives from 1977 to 1990.

== Life and career ==
Blanding was born in Sumter County, South Carolina, the son of Julius Blanding and Rosa Williams. He attended Sumter High School, graduating in 1971. After graduating, he attended Claflin College, earning his BA degree in 1975. He also attended South Carolina State College, earning his MEd degree in 1977.

Blanding served in the South Carolina House of Representatives from 1977 to 1990. He lost his seat in the House, in 1990, as a result of Operation Lost Trust, after pleading guilty to conspiracy and extortion.
