= Leo Higdon =

American academic

10th President of Connecticut College
- In office July 1, 2006 – December 31, 2013
- Preceded by: Norman Fainstein
- Succeeded by: Katherine Bergeron

20th President of the College of Charleston
- In office October 2001 – June 2006
- Preceded by: Alex Sanders
- Succeeded by: P. George Benson

10th President of Babson College
- In office July 1, 1997 – June 2001
- Preceded by: William Glavin
- Succeeded by: Brian Barefoot

Personal details
- Education: Georgetown University (BA); University of Chicago (MBA)

Leo Ignatius Higdon Jr. is an academic administrator and former Wall Street executive. He was previously president of Connecticut College (July 1, 2006, until his retirement on Dec. 31, 2013), the College of Charleston (from October 2001 to June 2006) and Babson College.

From 1968 until 1970, he and his wife served for two years as Peace Corps volunteers in Malawi. In 1972, he received an M.B.A. in finance from the University of Chicago.

Beginning in 1973, Higdon worked for the investment banking company Salomon Brothers. He eventually became vice chairman and head of the firm's global investment banking division.

He is a member of the board of directors of:

- Association of American Colleges and Universities
- Eaton Vance Corporation
- HealthSouth Corporation
