= William Tracy Gould =

American lawyer and educator (1799–1882)

- Born: October 25, 1799; Litchfield, Connecticut, U.S.
- Died: July 18, 1882 (aged 82)
- Occupations: Lawyer, judge, law professor

William Tracy Gould (October 25, 1799 – July 18, 1882) was an American lawyer and founder of the Augusta Law School, the first law school in the part of the United States known as the Deep South.

== Early life and education ==
Gould, son of Judge James Gould and Sally McCurdy Tracy Gould, was born in Litchfield, Connecticut on October 25, 1799. He entered Yale College at the age of thirteen. Immediately upon graduation he began to read law in his father's school, Litchfield Law School, and was admitted to the bar on arriving at the age of 21.

== Career ==
In 1821 Gould settled in Clinton, in the central part of Georgia, and in 1823, he moved to the city of Augusta, where the rest of his life was spent. He practiced law in Augusta for forty years. He opened the Augusta Law School and maintained it with good success until it was interrupted by the affliction caused by the death of his eldest son in 1854. In 1851 he was elected to the judgeship of the city court of Augusta, and discharged the duties of that office for fifteen years.

== Personal life ==
Gould was married, October 7, 1824, to Anna McKinne Gardner, the widowed daughter of James Gardner, of Augusta. She died October 6, 1860, having borne him two sons (the elder a graduate of Yale in the Class of 1845) and one daughter. He married again on September 20, 1864, to Virginia H., daughter of Wimberly J. Hunter, of Savannah, who survived him with several children. A severe fall several months before his death fractured a hip bone and confined him to bed, until he died on July 18, 1882, when he was 82 years old.
