= Robert A. Barber Jr. =

American politician

Member of the South Carolina House of Representatives from the 115th district
- In office 1989–1995
- Preceded by: Derwood Lorraine Aydlette, Jr.
- Succeeded by: Lynn Seithel

Member of the Charleston County School Board
- In office 1984–1989

Personal details
- Born: July 29, 1949 (age 77) Charleston, South Carolina, U.S.
- Party: Democratic
- Spouse: LaNelle Barber
- Education: Wofford College (BA); Duke University (M.Div.); South Texas College of Law (JD)
- Profession: Restaurateur; Minister; Lawyer

Robert A. Barber Jr. of Charleston was the 2006 Democratic Party's Nominee for Lieutenant Governor of South Carolina. In November 2006, Barber faced off against incumbent Republican Lieutenant Governor Andre Bauer, who sought a second term in office, defeating Barber in the General Election.

== Early life and career ==
Robert Barber was born in Charleston, South Carolina on July 29, 1949. Having spent his earliest years on Folly Beach and nearby Bowen's Island, Barber moved to Columbia with his parents at the age of 10. After graduating from Columbia High School in 1967, he attended Wofford College and graduated in 1971. Barber later received a Masters of Divinity from Duke University in 1976. He then returned to his native state and served as a minister in two Laurens County churches before entering law school. Receiving his J.D. degree in 1982 from the South Texas College of Law, Barber engaged in a general practice of law in Charleston before being elected to the Charleston County School Board in 1984.

== S.C. House of Representatives ==
Barber served for four years on the Charleston County School Board and from 1986 to 1988 served as its chairman. In 1988, he was elected into the South Carolina House of Representatives. Serving in the House from 1989 to 1994, Barber spent time on the Judiciary, Ways and Means, and Operations and Management Committees. In 1993 and 1994, he chaired the Joint Legislative Committee on Energy. In 1994, rather than run for re-election, Barber ran for the U.S. House of Representatives as the Democratic candidate for the First Congressional District, but lost to a political newcomer named Mark Sanford.

== Later career ==
After leaving the SC House, Barber split his time between running Bowen's Island Seafood Restaurant, which his grandparents founded in the 1940s, and serving as a consultant for a range of predominantly not-for-profit public interest groups. A conservationist, health care advisor, and advocate for the state's elderly population, Barber has attempted to improve the lives of many South Carolinians through his work for organizations such as the South Carolina Wildlife Federation, American Heart Association, American Cancer Society, the College of Charleston, the Palmetto Conservation Foundation, the Sierra Club and the Association of Council on Aging Directors.

In 2010, Barber ran for Comptroller General of South Carolina. He lost to Richard Eckstrom, the incumbent.

== The Barber Family ==
Barber met LaNelle Dominick in the 5th grade in Columbia. They dated throughout their high school years at Columbia High, as well as through college. They later married after Barber's graduation from Wofford. LaNelle, a graduate of Queens College, in Charlotte is now a public school teacher in Charleston, at Buist Academy.

Robert and LaNelle have two children, Hope and Matt. Hope and her husband, Bill McIntosh, live in Summerville with their two daughters, Mary Lesesne and Frances. Matt and his wife Danielle, live in Summerville with their daughter, Madelyn.

Barber's father, Bob Barber, worked for 35 years with the C&S National Bank in Charleston and Columbia. His mother, Cile, was a career homemaker who, with Bob's help, raised six children. After the children were grown, Cile opened antique shops in Columbia and Newberry. His parents have resided in Newberry since 1987.

Robert has four brothers and a sister who live and work in Charleston, Columbia and Irmo.

== See also ==
- 2006 South Carolina state elections

Party political offices
Preceded by Phil P. Leventis	Democratic Party nominee for Lieutenant Governor of South Carolina; 2006	Succeeded by Ashley Cooper
Preceded by Drew Theodore	Democratic Party nominee for Comptroller General of South Carolina; 2010	Succeeded by Kyle Herbert
