= JD Chaplin =

American politician

Member of the South Carolina Senate from the 29th district
- Incumbent
- Assumed office November 15, 2024
- Preceded by: Gerald Malloy

Personal details
- Party: Republican
- Profession: Farmer

JD Chaplin is a member of the South Carolina Senate, representing the 29th District (Chesterfield, Darlington, Lee, Sumter and Marlboro Counties) since 2024. Chaplin is a Republican.

== Political career ==
=== S.C. Senate ===
==== 2020 election ====
In 2020, Chaplin challenged Democratic incumbent Gerald Malloy. Malloy defeated Chaplin, receiving roughly 54% of the vote.

==== 2024 election and recount ====
In 2024, Chaplin once again challenged Malloy. Chaplin was endorsed by Americans for Prosperity - South Carolina. He pledged to support Congressional term limits.

On general election day, Chaplin held a lead of 287 votes, a less than 1% difference which drew an automatic election recount by law. A Chaplin win meant a Republican supermajority in the Senate. The recount took place the following week on Thursday, November 14, 2024. When it was completed, Chaplin's victory was verified and certified.

===== Protest =====
On Tuesday, November 19, Malloy filed a protest with the South Carolina Election Commission regarding the recount of the Senate District 29 race. The focus was on irregularities in the Lee County results. Chaplin and South Carolina Republican Party chair Drew McKissick responded with statements calling Malloy an 'election denier'. Malloy asked for a new election if irregularities could not be remedied.

The protest hearing was scheduled for December 3, 2024. If there was an appeal of the decision, it would be heard by the South Carolina Senate for a final decision, according to South Carolina law.

On Monday, December 2, the day before the scheduled hearing, Malloy conceded to Chaplin and withdrew his protest. Malloy stated in the withdrawal document that analysis was not possible because the state Election Commission would not make vote data available to his expert witness, Duncan Buell, a retired University of South Carolina computer science professor.

=== Senate Committees ===
Chaplin serves on the Senate Agriculture and Natural Resources, Family and Veterans' Services, Fish, Game and Forestry, Judiciary and Transportation committees.

=== Electoral College ===
Chaplin served as a member of the 2024 South Carolina Electoral College, representing Congressional District 7. During the December 17, 2024 meeting of the electors, Chaplin as a newly elected public official was replaced by Michael Connett to represent the District.

South Carolina Senate
Preceded by Gerald Malloy	Member of the South Carolina Senate from the 29th district 2024–present	Incumbent
