= Andrew Hsu =

U.S. Higher Education Administrator

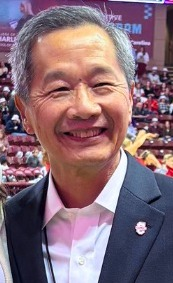
- Hsu in 2025

23rd President of the College of Charleston
- Incumbent
- Assumed office May 17, 2019
- Preceded by: Glenn F. McConnell

Personal details
- Born: Beijing, China
- Spouse: Rongrong
- Children: 4
- Education: Tsinghua University (BS); Georgia Institute of Technology (MS, PhD)

Andrew T. Hsu (simplified Chinese: 许多鸣; traditional Chinese: 許多鳴) is an American aerospace engineer who has been the 23rd president of the College of Charleston since 2019. He began his presidency on May 17, 2019. He is the first person of color to serve as president in the college's 253-year history.

== Education ==
Born in Beijing, China, Hsu attended Tsinghua University in Beijing before earning master's and doctoral degrees in aerospace engineering from Georgia Institute of Technology in 1982 and 1986, respectively.

== Career ==
Hsu worked for Sverdrup Technology and Rolls-Royce before joining the University of Miami as an associate professor and director of aerospace engineering in 1997. Hsu was the founding director of the Richard G. Lugar Center for Renewable Energy at IUPUI (2007-2010). He served as dean of engineering at San Jose State University (2013-2016) and provost and executive vice president for academic affairs at the University of Toledo (2016-2019) before becoming the 23rd president of the College of Charleston in 2019.
