= P. George Benson =

American academic administrator

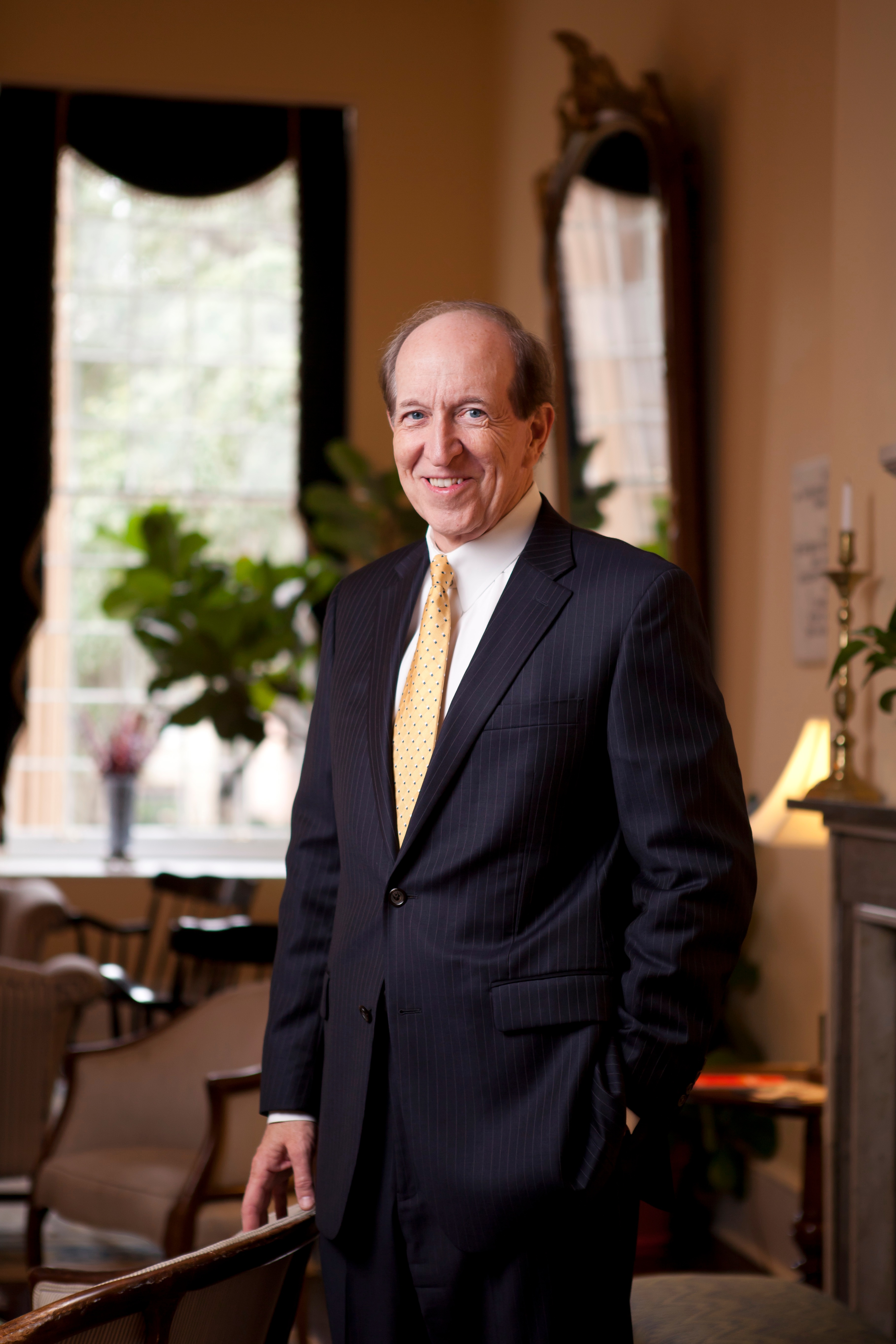

21st President of the College of Charleston
- In office February 1, 2007 – July 1, 2014
- Preceded by: Leo Higdon
- Succeeded by: Glenn F. McConnell

Personal details
- Born: Paul George Benson; June 3, 1946 (age 80) Lewisburg, Pennsylvania
- Spouse: Jane Oas
- Children: 3
- Education: Bucknell University (BS); New York University (MBA); University of Florida (PhD)

Paul George Benson (born June 3, 1946) is an American academic, and the former President of the College of Charleston in Charleston, South Carolina.

== Early life and education ==
Benson was born in Lewisburg, Pennsylvania to Paul Benson (1911-1975) and Anna Louise Stolz Benson (1921-2014). His father was the CEO of Royal Imprints, Inc. and his mother taught mathematics at Bucknell University. In 1951, Benson's brother Charles ("Chuck") Edward Benson was born. In 1960, his father sold Royal Imprints and returned to teaching statistics and mathematics at Bucknell University, which he had done for several years in the 1940s. After being a homemaker in the 1950s, his mother returned to teaching at Milton Junior High School, as she worked on a Master of Science degree in Education at Bucknell, which she received in 1964. She then became a guidance counselor at Lewisburg Joint High School until she retired in 1983.

Benson graduated from Lewisburg Joint High School in 1964. He attended Bucknell University in his hometown, graduating with a Bachelor of Science degree in Mathematics in 1968. While a student at Bucknell, Benson joined the Kappa chapter of the Sigma Chi fraternity and played varsity golf. He worked as a Management Analyst for the Army Security Agency in Arlington, Virginia for a year after graduating from Bucknell. He assisted in determining the Agency's personnel needs worldwide. In June 1969, Benson joined Bell Telephone Laboratories in Whippany, N.J. as a Computer Program Design Engineer and Member of Technical Staff. He was part of a team responsible for developing and maintaining AT&T's first data management system. While at Bell Labs, Benson did graduate work in operations research at New York University. In September 1971, he entered the management science PhD program in what is now the Warrington College of Business at the University of Florida. He received a PhD in Decision Sciences with minors in statistics and economics in August 1977.

== Career ==
In spring of 1976, Benson was hired as an assistant professor in the Department of Management Sciences at the University of Minnesota's Carlson School of Management. He moved to Minnesota in late December 1976 and began teaching in January 1977. He was promoted to associate professor with tenure in May 1982. From 1983 to 1988, he was the Area Head of Decision Sciences and from 1992 to 1993 was the Director of the Operations Management Center. In June 1993, he became the Dean of Rutgers University's Business School, as well as a professor of decision sciences. In June 1998, Benson became the Dean of the University of Georgia's Terry College of Business and the Simon S. Selig Jr. Chair for Economic Growth. He held this position until February 1, 2007, when he became President of the College of Charleston.

He stepped down as President of the College of Charleston on July 1, 2014. South Carolina Lieutenant Governor Glenn F. McConnell was appointed as his successor. Benson took a one-year sabbatical before returning to the College of Charleston as a faculty member in the School of Business. Benson is currently teaching Business Statistics in the Supply Chain and Information Management Department.

Benson sits on three corporate boards: AGCO Corporation, Crawford & Company, and Primerica, Inc. He is the Chairman of the Board of Directors of the Foundation for the Malcolm Baldrige National Quality Award. The foundation is a nonprofit, private-sector organization that raises funds to support the Baldrige Performance Excellence Program. The Malcolm Baldrige National Quality Award (MBNQA) was established in 1987 and it is presented annually by the President of the United States to organizations that demonstrate quality and performance excellence. It was established by Congress to identify and recognize role-model businesses; establish certain criteria for evaluating improvement efforts; and share best practices. It was expanded to include healthcare and education in 1998 and the nonprofit sector in 2005.
