= Jeff Zell =

American politician

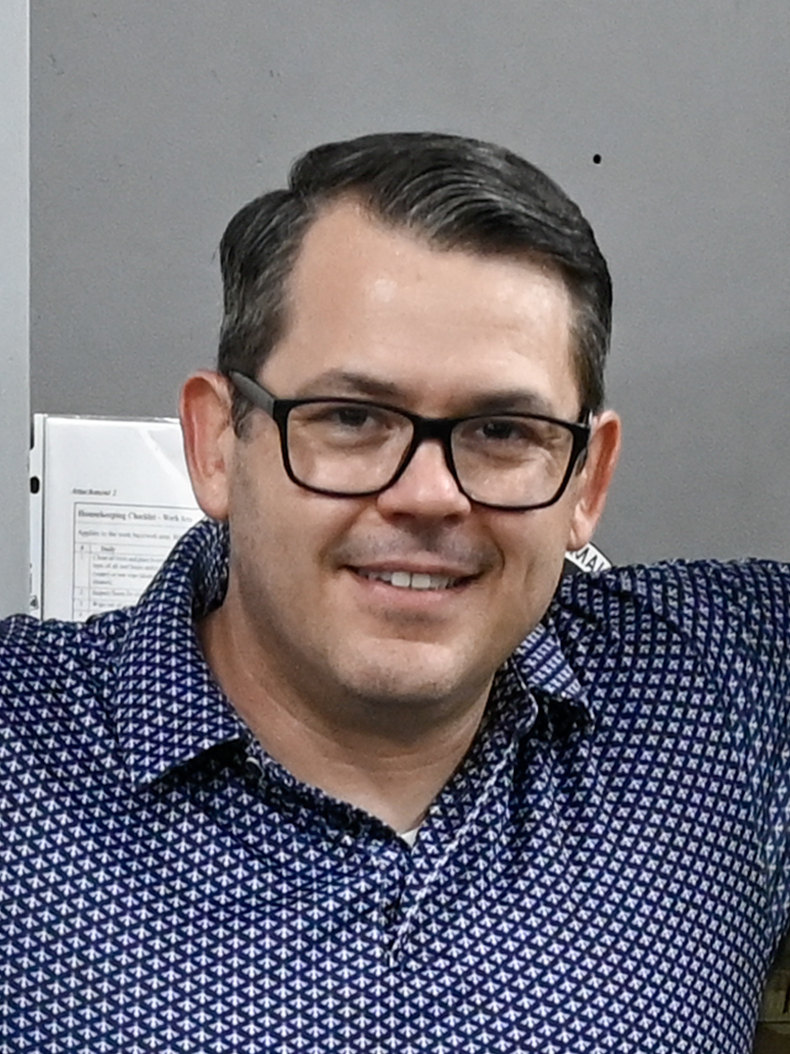
- Zell in 2025

Member of the South Carolina Senate from the 36th district
- Incumbent
- Assumed office January 14, 2025
- Preceded by: Kevin L. Johnson

Personal details
- Born: March 18, 1980 (age 46) Bellefontaine, Ohio, U.S.
- Party: Republican
- Spouse: Christina Marie (m. 2009)
- Children: 1
- Education: Community College of the Air Force (AA); American Military University (BA)

Military service
- Branch: United States Air Force
- Years of service: 2002—2022

Jeff Zell (born March 18, 1980) is an American politician who is a member of the South Carolina Senate, representing the 36th District since 2024. A member of the Republican party, he previously served in the U.S. Air Force.

== Early life and career ==
Zell was born in Bellefontaine, Ohio, and joined the U.S. Air Force at 22 years old. He earned an Associate of Arts from the Community College of the Air Force and a Bachelor of Arts from American Military University. He served on Shaw Air Force Base after 20 years of military service.

In 2022, Zell defeated former Democratic state senator Phil P. Leventis to serve on the District 8 trustee on Sumter School District's board of trustees.

== South Carolina Senate ==
In 2024, Zell defeated Leon Winn in the Republican primary to face incumbent Democratic senator Kevin L. Johnson in the South Carolina Senate District 36 race.

Zell defeated Johnson in the general election.

Zell serves on the Senate Agriculture and Natural Resources, Family and Veterans' Services, Fish, Game and Forestry, Judiciary and Medical Affairs committees.
