= Gerald Malloy =

American politician

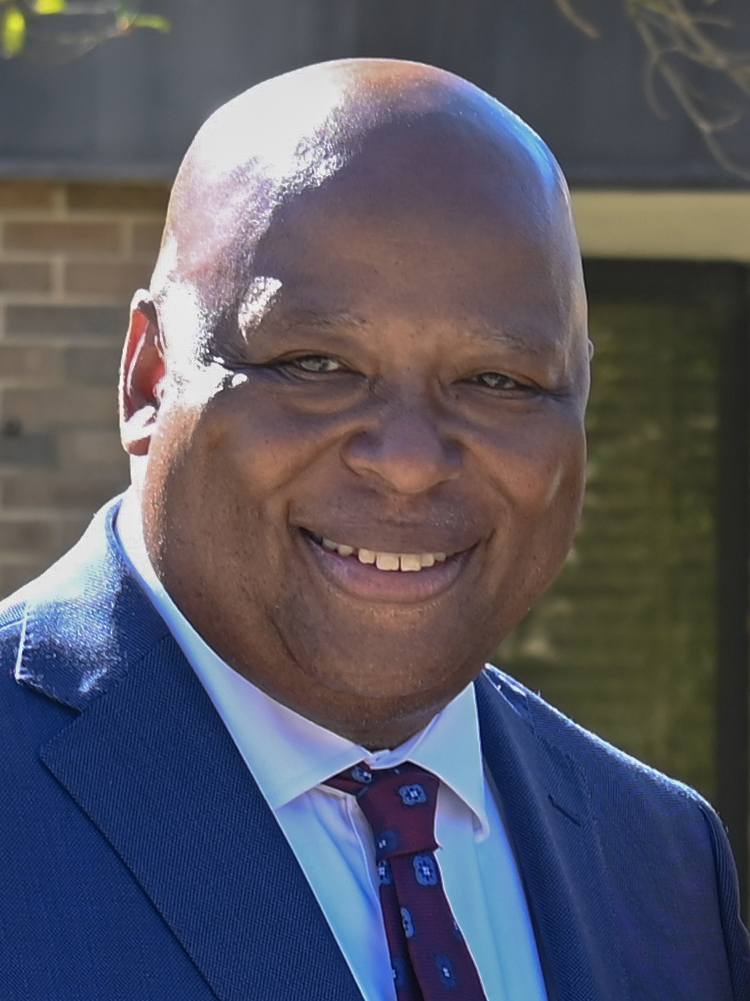
- Malloy in 2024

Member of the South Carolina Senate from the 29th district
- In office November 5, 2002 – November 14, 2024
- Preceded by: Edward Eli Saleeby
- Succeeded by: JD Chaplin

Personal details
- Born: October 26, 1961 (age 64) Chesterfield County, South Carolina, U.S.
- Party: Democratic
- Spouse: Davita McFarland (m. 1989)
- Children: 4
- Education: University of South Carolina (BS, JD)
- Profession: Attorney

Gerald Malloy (born October 26, 1961) is a former member of the South Carolina Senate, who represented the 29th District (Chesterfield, Darlington, Lee, and Marlboro Counties) from 2002 to 2024. Malloy is a Democrat.

== Political career ==
Malloy represented the 29th District for 22 years. He served on many committees during his tenure in the Senate, including the SC Commission on Indigent Defense and the Robert Smalls Monument Commission. Malloy was a close friend of Senator Clementa C. Pinckney, who was slain in the Charleston Church shooting. Malloy was also the attorney for the Pinckney family.

=== S.C. Senate ===
==== 2002 election ====
Following the death of Senator Edward Eli Saleeby, a special election was held to fill his seat. There were eight people in the initial candidate pool, including Saleeby's son, Edward Saleeby Jr. Malloy would go on to win the seat.

==== 2016 election ====
Malloy was uncontested in 2016.

==== 2020 election ====
In 2020, Malloy faced Republican farmer JD Chaplin. Malloy defeated Chaplin, receiving roughly 54% of the vote. In November 2020, Malloy announced that he would run for Senate Minority Leader. He lost to Brad Hutto.

==== 2024 election and recount ====
In 2024, Malloy saw a repeat challenge from Chaplin. On general election day, Chaplin held a lead of 287 votes, a less than 1% difference which drew an automatic recount by law. With the recount completed, Malloy was defeated by Chaplin.

==== Protest and concession ====
On Tuesday, November 19, Malloy filed a protest with the South Carolina Election Commission regarding the recount of the Senate District 29 race. The focus was on irregularities in the Lee County results. Malloy's legal team includes the son of state senator Brad Hutto, former US Attorney Bill Nettles, and Malloy's son Donovan. Opponent JD Chaplin and South Carolina Republican Party chair Drew McKissick responded with statements calling Malloy an 'election denier'. Malloy asked for a new election if irregularities could not be remedied.

The protest hearing was scheduled for December 3, 2024. Any appeal of the decision would have to be heard by the South Carolina Senate for a final decision, according to South Carolina law.

On Monday, December 2, the day before the scheduled hearing, Malloy conceded to Chaplin and withdrew his protest. Malloy stated in the withdrawal document that analysis was not possible because the state Election Commission would not make vote data available to his expert witness, Duncan Buell, a retired University of South Carolina computer science professor.

== Awards and honors ==
Selected list:

- Recipient of the South Carolina Library Association Friend of the Libraries, 2004
- Champion of State Criminal Justice Reform Award by Nation's Criminal Defense Bar, 2016
- Compleat Lawyer Award, Joseph F. Rice School of Law, University of South Carolina, 2024

== Post- Senate activities ==
On January 8, 2025, the Robert Smalls Monument Commission, a South Carolina State agency, unanimously appointed Malloy to chair the Commission's fundraising committee tasked with generating funds to complete the Smalls Monument.

South Carolina Senate
Preceded by Edward Eli Saleeby	Member of the South Carolina Senate from the 29th district 2002–2024	Incumbent
