= André Bauer =

American politician (born 1969)

- Official portrait, 2026

United States Ambassador to Belize
- Incumbent
- Assumed office September 7, 2026
- President: Donald Trump
- Preceded by: Michelle Kwan

87th Lieutenant Governor of South Carolina
- In office January 15, 2003 – January 12, 2011
- Governor: Mark Sanford
- Preceded by: Bob Peeler
- Succeeded by: Ken Ard

Member of the South Carolina Senate from the 18th district
- In office March 31, 1999 – January 15, 2003
- Preceded by: Jim Lander
- Succeeded by: Ronnie Cromer

Member of the South Carolina House of Representatives from the 85th district
- In office January 3, 1997 – March 31, 1999
- Preceded by: David Wright
- Succeeded by: Chip Huggins

Personal details
- Born: Rudolph Andreas Bauer; March 20, 1969 (age 57) Charleston, South Carolina, U.S.
- Party: Republican
- Spouse: Meredith Carter (m. 2018)
- Education: University of South Carolina (BS)

Rudolph Andreas "André" Bauer (born March 20, 1969) is an American businessman, diplomat and politician who is the United States ambassador to Belize. He was the 87th lieutenant governor of South Carolina from 2003 to 2011. He is a member of the Republican Party. Bauer was a member of the South Carolina House of Representatives (1996–1999) and a member of the South Carolina State Senate (1999–2003). In 2016, he became a CNN political analyst, supporting the presidential campaign of Donald Trump. CNN dismissed Bauer in February 2019.

== Early life, education, and business career ==
Bauer was born in Charleston, on March 20, 1969. He is the son of William R. Bauer and Saundrea Jill Bauer. He graduated from Irmo High School and received a Bachelor of Science in business administration from the University of South Carolina in 1991, where he was a member of Tau Kappa Epsilon fraternity.

Bauer was self-employed, selling sports merchandise to national franchise stores. Bauer is also a lieutenant colonel in the Civil Air Patrol's South Carolina Wing.

Bauer has also been a Junior Achievement teacher and is a current member of the following boards: the Lake Murray Tourism and Recreation Association, the American Diabetes Association, the Columbia Visitors' Bureau, the S.C. Small Business Chamber of Commerce, and the Sons of the American Revolution.

In 2001, Bauer was recognized as Alumnus of the Year for the University of South Carolina College of Applied Professional Science. Bauer is a member of Union United Methodist Church.

== Political career ==
=== South Carolina General Assembly ===
==== Elections ====
Bauer served in the South Carolina House of Representatives from 1997 to 1999. In 1999, Bauer was elected to the South Carolina State Senate in a special election. He was then re-elected in the 2000 general election and served in the State Senate until his inauguration as Lieutenant Governor on January 15, 2003.

==== Committee assignments ====
He served on the Agriculture, Natural Resources and Environmental Affairs Committee.

=== Lieutenant governor ===
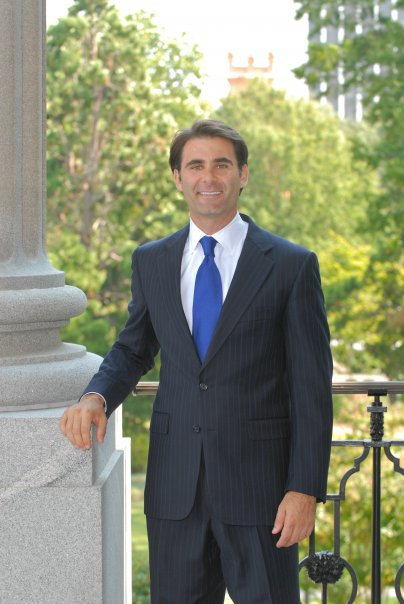
Bauer during his tenure as Lieutenant Governor of South Carolina

==== Elections ====
2002

He came in second in the Republican primary to fellow State Senator David L. Thomas of Greenville, but defeated Thomas in the runoff for the nomination. He then defeated fellow State Senator Phil P. Leventis, a Democrat from Sumter, in the 2002 general election for Lt. Governor, with more than 52 percent of the vote.

2006

Bauer faced two primary challenges for re-election, and a general election in 2006. The first challenge was launched by Mike Campbell, son of former Governor Carroll A. Campbell Jr. (R). Bauer also faced Henry Jordan, founder of the South Carolina branch of the Christian Coalition. During the primaries, Bauer portrayed himself as the underdog in this three-way race, despite being an incumbent. His opponents outspent him 3 to 1 in the campaigns. In the course of the campaign, Campbell received the endorsements of former President George H. W. Bush, a friend of his father, and First Lady Jenny Sanford, the wife of Governor Mark Sanford.

The primary of June 13, 2006, ended with Mike Campbell receiving 47 percent of the vote, Andre Bauer 37%, and Henry Jordan 18%. As Campbell did not win a majority, he faced Bauer in a runoff election on June 27 for the Republican nomination. Bauer won the runoff with slightly over 51 percent of vote. He then narrowly defeated Democrat Robert A. Barber, Jr., a former state representative, attorney and lobbyist in the general election. Bauer received 543,414 votes (50.08%), while Barber received 540,306 votes (49.79%).

=== Tenure ===
In 2008, Bauer supported legislation, enacted by the South Carolina General Assembly, that created a new state license plate containing the words "I Believe" and a Christian cross superimposed on a stained glass window. The legislation was challenged in the case Summers v. Adams, in which the U.S. District Court for the District of South Carolina struck down the law. In November 2009, Judge Cameron McGowan Currie ruled on summary judgment that the "I Believe" Act violated the federal Constitution, and permanently enjoined the state from issuing the plates "I Believe" state license plates. Judge Currie also noted:

The "I Believe" Act had its genesis in Lieutenant Governor Andre Bauer’s desire to do here what had been unsuccessful in the state of Florida–to gain legislative approval of a specialty plate promoting the majority religion: Christianity. Whether motivated by sincerely held Christian beliefs or an effort to purchase political capital with religious coin, the result is the same. The statute is clearly unconstitutional and defense of its implementation has embroiled the state in unnecessary (and expensive) litigation.

Sanford sex scandal

In the summer of 2009, Governor Mark Sanford disappeared for several days, leading to the exposure of an adulterous affair and allegations that he had committed numerous misdemeanors. This led to an investigation by the state commission on ethics and a threat of impeachment by the legislature. Had Sanford been impeached, Bauer would have become acting governor during the trial. However, in December 2009, legislative moves to impeach Sanford collapsed as the House Judiciary Committee voted instead merely to censure him.

Controversial comments on the poor

In January 2010, Bauer came under fire for comparing public school children who receive free lunches to stray animals who should not be fed. "My grandmother was not a highly educated woman, but she told me as a small child to quit feeding stray animals," Bauer said during a town hall meeting. "You know why? Because they breed. You're facilitating the problem if you give an animal or a person ample food supply. They will reproduce, especially ones that don't... think too much further than that. And so what you've got to do is you've got to curtail that type of behavior. They don't know any better." Bauer made the comment as part of an argument that people should lose government benefits if they fail drug tests or don't attend parent-teacher conferences or Parent-Teacher Association meetings. The Associated Press reported that Bauer was a child of divorce who benefited from free lunches himself.

=== 2010 Gubernatorial election ===
Andre Bauer officially announced his plans to run for governor with a statewide tour on March 22, 2010. In December 2009, former Arkansas Governor and 2008 Republican presidential candidate Mike Huckabee endorsed Bauer for Governor. Bauer was defeated in the Republican primary in June 2010.

=== 2012 Congressional election ===
In 2012 Bauer unsuccessfully ran for the new South Carolina's 7th congressional district; however, after initially winning the primary against Tom Rice, on June 12, by 32% to 27%, he was defeated in the runoff against Rice by 56% to 44%.

=== Ambassadorial nominations ===
On July 17, 2020, President Trump nominated Bauer to be Ambassador Extraordinary and Plenipotentiary of the United States of America to Belize. On January 3, 2021, his nomination was returned to the President under Rule XXXI, Paragraph 6 of the United States Senate.

On April 21, 2026, President Trump nominated Bauer again to be Ambassador Extraordinary and Plenipotentiary of the United States of America to Belize. His nomination was confirmed by the U.S. Senate in August 2026 and he took office a month later on September 7.

=== Presidential endorsements ===
In January 2008, Bauer endorsed Arkansas Governor Mike Huckabee for the 2008 Republican presidential nomination.

In November 2011, Bauer endorsed Newt Gingrich for the 2012 Republican presidential nomination.

In February 2016, Bauer endorsed Donald Trump in the 2016 Republican presidential nomination.

=== 2026 US Senate race ===
Several news outlets reported that Bauer was considering joining the 2026 US Senate race. He officially entered the race on July 2, 2025. He withdrew on August 8, 2025.

== Personal life ==
According to his driving record with the South Carolina Department of Motor Vehicles, Bauer has had at least two accidents, four tickets, and one suspended license for failure to pay a ticket. On May 6, 2003, Bauer was stopped on Assembly Street in downtown Columbia, South Carolina, for running two red lights and speeding up to 60 mph in a 35-mph zone. The officer drew his gun after Bauer got out of the car and began heading toward the officer's car in an "aggressive manner." He was issued a ticket for reckless driving. On December 26, 2005, Bauer got a warning for speeding (77 mph in a 65 mph zone) in Laurens County, South Carolina. On February 25, 2006, Bauer was pulled over for speeding over 100 mph in Chester County, South Carolina in a state-issued car, but he was allowed to proceed without a ticket or warning.

On May 23, 2006, Bauer was injured in a single-engine airplane crash shortly after taking off from a small airfield in Blacksburg, South Carolina. Bauer, who was the pilot of the Mooney M20E single-prop airplane, and his passenger escaped the wreckage before the plane caught fire. Bauer's passenger had only minor injuries. Bauer, however, was more seriously injured. He underwent surgery for a shattered left heel. The incident was voted "Best Political Stunt in 2006" by readers of the Free Times alternative weekly tabloid. While the factual report indicated that "best practice" procedures would have revealed that the airfield was too short to safely take off from, the findings only addressed Bauer's "failure to abort the takeoff after the airplane failed to achieve adequate airspeed on the takeoff roll for undetermined reasons." According to FAA regulations, "[t]he pilot in command of an aircraft is directly responsible for . . . the operation of that aircraft" including determining if the aircraft is in airworthy condition and properly making the decision to abort takeoff in time to avoid a crash. Though in no way relieving Bauer of his being responsible for the crash, a June 11, 2009 court ruling points to a possible reason the airplane might not have achieved sufficient takeoff speed. Administrative Judge Richard C. Goodwin concluded “By overhauling the engine and returning it to service with incorrect bolts installed, respondent created an unnecessary risk in engine performance.”

On August 7, 2018, Bauer married Myrtle Beach real estate agent Meredith Carter. They have a son, Andrè Wesley Bauer. Bauer also has one stepdaughter and twin stepsons.

Party political offices
Preceded by Bob Peeler	Republican nominee for Lieutenant Governor of South Carolina; 2002, 2006	Succeeded by Ken Ard
Political offices
Preceded by Bob Peeler	Lieutenant Governor of South Carolina; 2003–2011	Succeeded by Ken Ard
