= Alex Harvin =

American attorney and politician

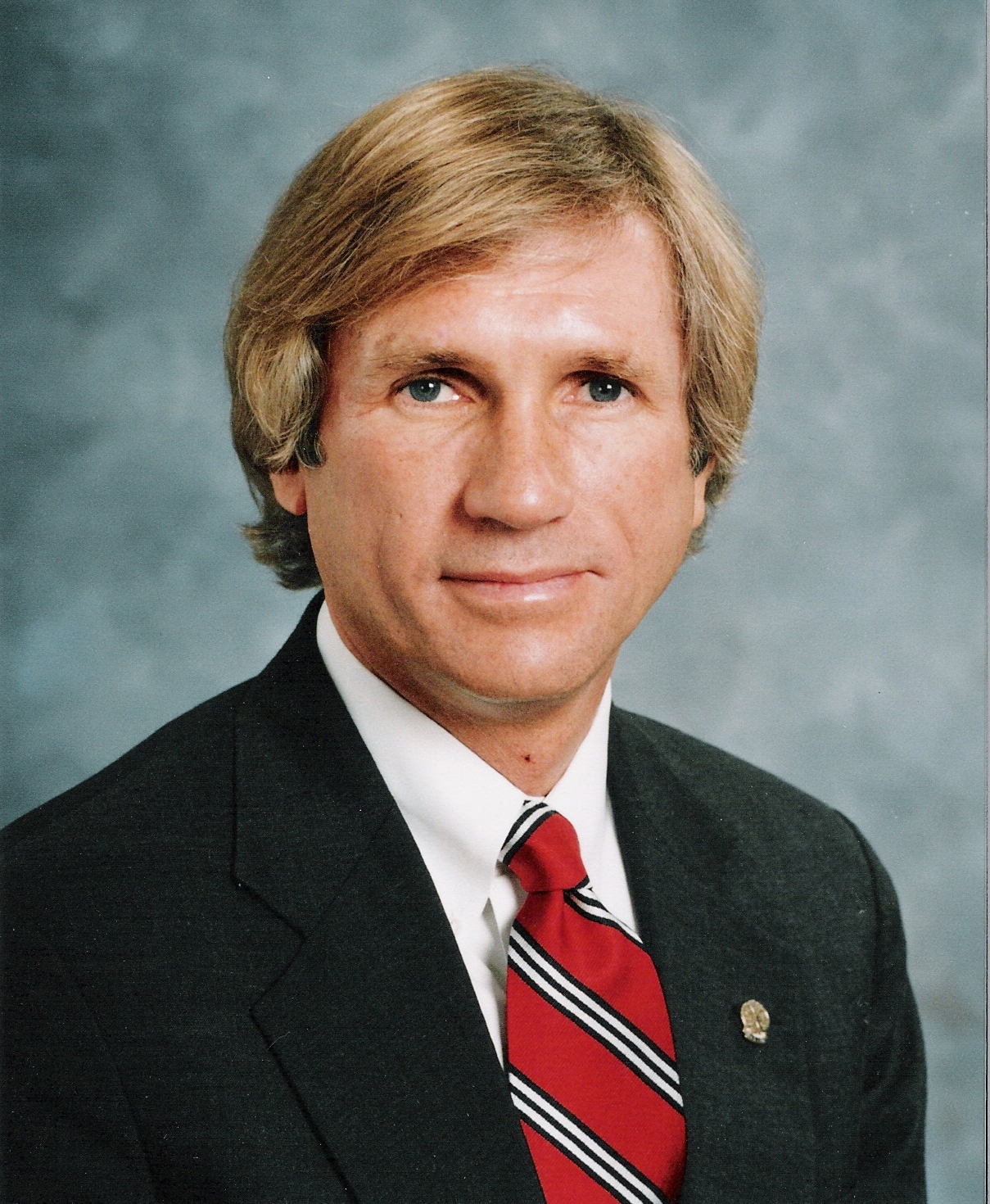

Member of the South Carolina House of Representatives from the 64th district
- In office January 1977 – October 11, 2005
- Preceded by: Ralph King Anderson Jr.
- Succeeded by: Cathy Harvin

Personal details
- Born: Charles Alexander Harvin III; February 7, 1950 Sumter, South Carolina
- Died: October 11, 2005 (aged 55) Charleston, South Carolina
- Party: Democratic
- Spouse: Cathy Jane Brand
- Education: Charleston Southern University (BA); Augusta Law School (JD)
- Awards: Order of the Palmetto

Military service
- Branch/service: South Carolina State Guard
- Rank: Major

Charles Alexander Harvin III (February 7, 1950 – October 11, 2005) was an American attorney and politician who was a state legislator from South Carolina. He was a Democrat.

Born in Sumter, South Carolina, Harvin received his bachelor's degree from Charleston Southern University and his law degree from Augusta Law School. Harvin served in the South Carolina House of Representatives from 1977 until his death in 2005, aged 55 after a long illness and was from Summerton, South Carolina. His wife Cathy Harvin was elected to the seat and served until her own death in 2010 at the age of 56.

South Carolina House of Representatives
Preceded by John C. Land III	Member of the South Carolina House of Representatives from the 66th district 1977–1983	Succeeded by Larry Blanding
Preceded by Woodrow Maxie McKay	Member of the South Carolina House of Representatives from the 64th district 1983–2005	Succeeded by Cathy Harvin
