= Cathy Harvin =

American politician and legislator

- In office 2006–2010
- Preceded by: Charles Alexander Harvin
- Succeeded by: Kevin L. Johnson

Personal details
- Party: Democratic
- Spouse: Charles Alexander Harvin

Cathy Jane Harvin (née Brand; December 31, 1953 – December 4, 2010) was an American Democratic politician and legislator from South Carolina.

Born to Janet and Hyman Brand in Quantico, Virginia, she graduated from the University of South Carolina in 1975. In 2006, she was elected to the South Carolina House of Representatives, from Summerton, South Carolina, serving until her death at age 56 from breast cancer, at the Medical University of South Carolina hospital in Charleston.

She was predeceased by her husband, Charles Alexander Harvin, III, who died 2005, she succeeded him when she was appointed to the same seat.
