= Edward Sherman Gould =

19th-century author and critic

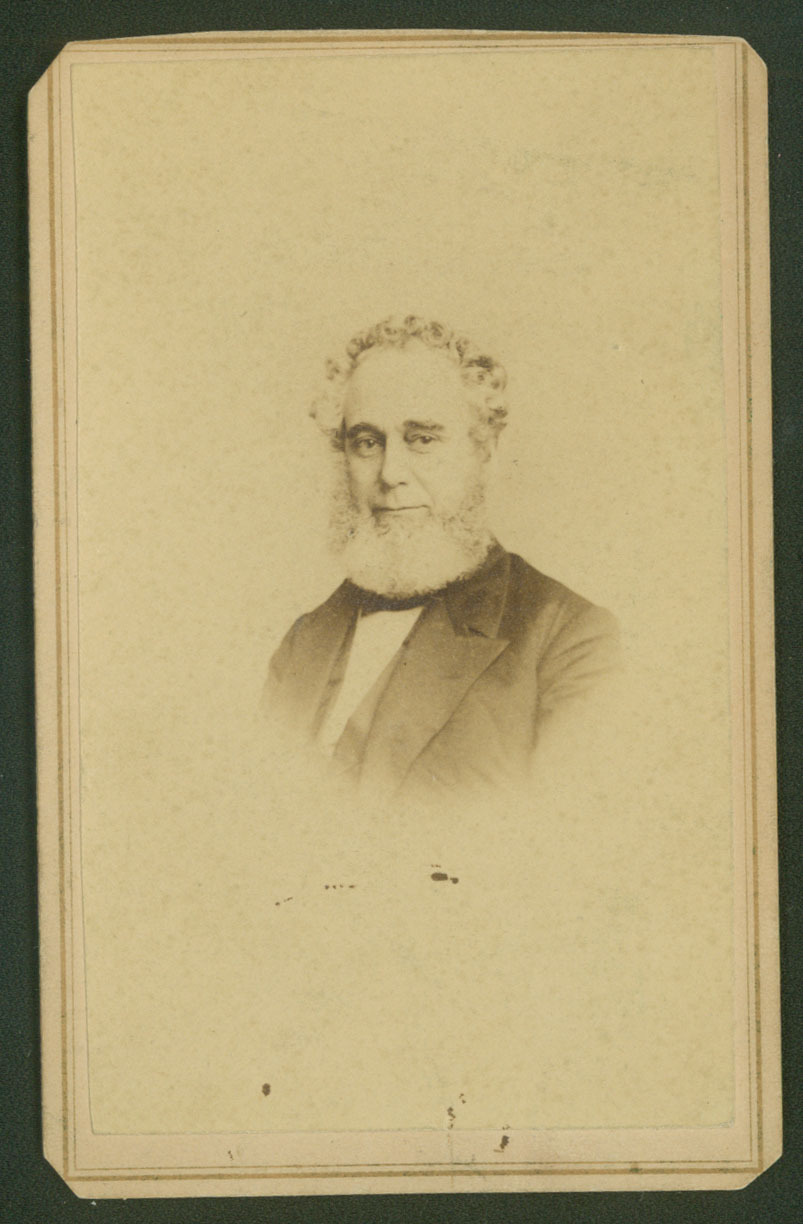
- Born: May 11, 1808; Litchfield
- Died: February 21, 1885 (aged 76); New York City
- Occupation: Writer
- Parent(s): James Gould

Edward Sherman Gould (May 11, 1808, - February 21, 1885) was an American writer and critic from the 19th century.

Gould was born in Litchfield, Connecticut and died in New York City.

== Biography ==
He was the son of jurist James Gould, and an early contributor of tales to the Knickerbocker Magazine, to the New World, the Mirror, The Literary World, and other journals. His signature of "Cassio" in Charles King's American was at one time well-known.

In 1830 he lectured before the New York Mercantile Library Association on "American Criticism in American Literature". In his talk, he opposed the prevalent spirit of overflowing praise as injurious to the interests of the country.

His examination of correct use of English is the subject of several of his books, such as, Good English, or Popular Errors in Language (1867). At the time, there was great interest among many Victorian authors about the Germanic origin, evolution, and proper use of English, among criticism that continues into contemporary times.

== Works ==
Translations:

- Alexandre Dumas, Travels in Egypt and Arabia Petraea (1839)
- Dupré, Progress of Democracy (1841)
- Honoré de Balzac, Eugénie Grandet (1841)
- Honoré de Balzac, Père Goriot (1842)
- Alexandre Dumas, Impressions of Travel in Switzerland
- Victor Hugo, Handsome Pecopin
- A. Royer, Charles de Bourbon (1842-1843)

In addition to contributing to many literary and theological journals, he wrote:

- Gould, Edward Sherman (1843). The Sleep Rider; or, the Old Boy in the Omnibus.
- Abridgment of Alison's History of Europe (New York, 1843)
- The Very Age, a comedy (1850)
- John Doe and Richard Roe; or, Episodes of Life in New York (1862)
- Good English, or Popular Errors in Language (1867)
- Classical Elocution (1867)
- Supplement to Duyckinck's History of the New World (1871)
