= Edward Eli Saleeby =

American politician

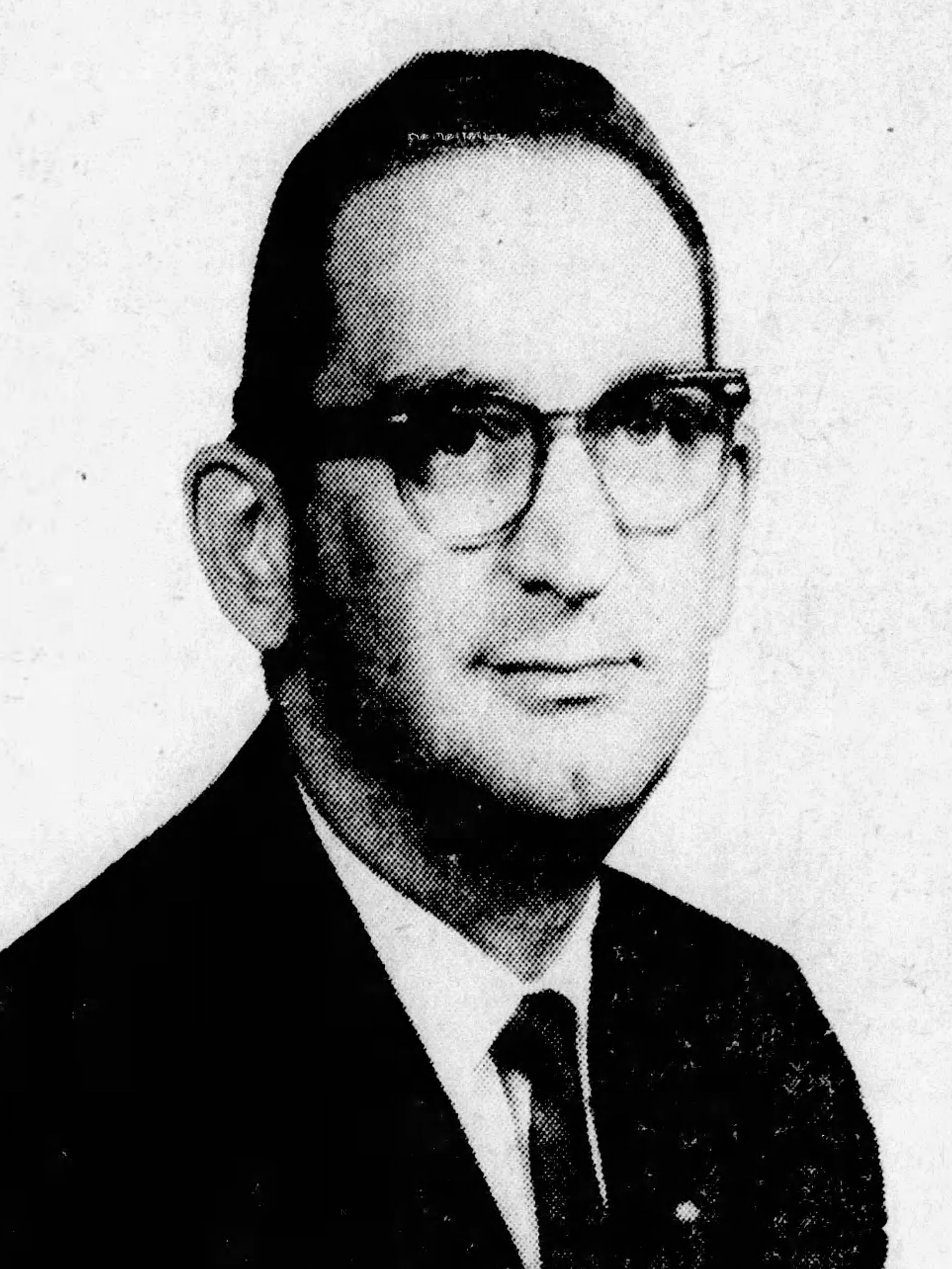

Member of the South Carolina Senate
- In office January 9, 1973 – July 6, 2002
- Preceded by: J. P. "Spot" Mozingo
- Succeeded by: Gerald Malloy
- Constituency: 10th district (1973–1985); 29th district (1985–2002)

Member of the South Carolina House of Representatives from the Darlington County district
- In office January 9, 1951 – January 13, 1959

Personal details
- Born: September 8, 1927 Hartsville, South Carolina, U.S.
- Died: July 6, 2002 (aged 74)
- Spouse: Willie Meta Calcutt (m. 1951)
- Children: 3
- Education: University of South Carolina, LLB)
- Profession: Attorney

Edward Eli Saleeby (September 8, 1927 – July 6, 2002) was a Democratic member of the South Carolina Senate, representing the 29th District (Darlington, Florence, Lee). He represented the district from the time he first defeated powerful incumbent J. P. "Spot" Mozingo in a Democratic primary in 1972 until he died in office in 2002.

== Community service ==
Saleeby served on the board of trustees for the University of South Carolina and Coker College, and on the Board of Visitors for Clemson University. He served as President of the South Carolina Trial Lawyers' Association and on the board of directors for the South Carolina Bar Association. Saleeby also served on the advisory board of the South Carolina National Bank.

== Political career ==
Saleeby served in the South Carolina House of Representatives from 1951 to 1958. He was elected to the Senate in 1972. He served in the South Carolina Senate from 1972 until his death in 2002.

During his tenure in the Senate, Saleeby was Chair of the Senate Banking and Insurance Committee, vice chair of the Senate Judiciary and Education Committees, and served on the Senate Labor, Commerce and Industry, and the Ethics Committees.

== Legacy ==
A portrait of Saleeby was commissioned, and hangs in the State Senate Chambers.

South Carolina Senate
Preceded by J. P. "Spot" Mozingo	Member of the South Carolina Senate from the 29th district 1972–2002	Succeeded by Gerald Malloy
