= James Gould (jurist) =

American lawyer

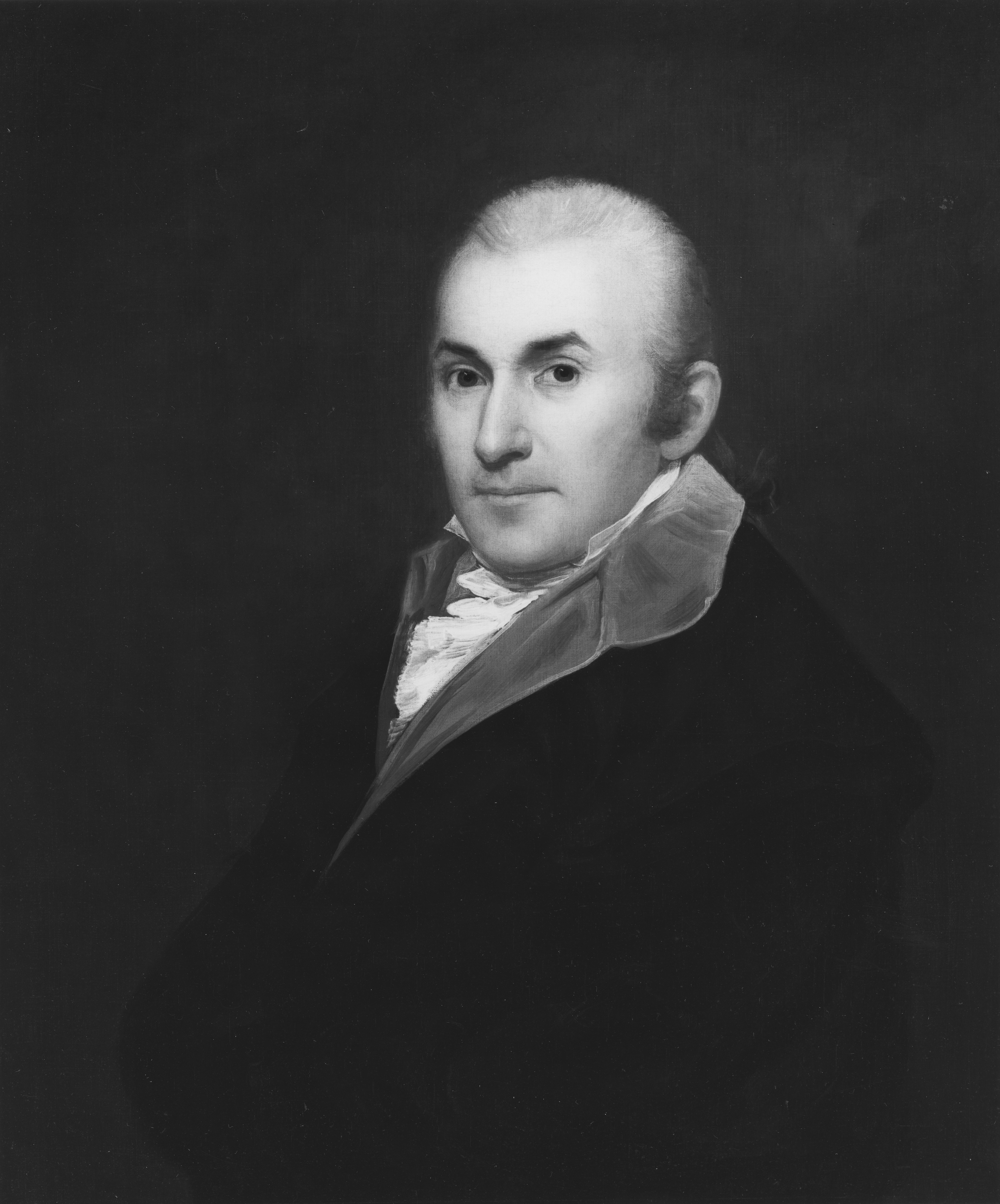
- Born: 5 December 1770
- Died: 11 May 1838 (aged 67)
- Occupation: Politician
- Children: William Tracy Gould

James Gould (5 December 1770 in Branford, Connecticut – 11 May 1838 in Litchfield, Connecticut) was an American jurist and an early professor at the Litchfield Law School.

== Biography ==
Gould was born in Branford, Connecticut, on December 5, 1770, to Dr. William and Mary (Guy) Gould. Richard, his great-grandfather, came from Devonshire to Branford about 1700. Despite poor eyesight, he graduated from Yale in 1791, and was a tutor there in 1793–1795. He also worked as a teacher in Wethersfield, Connecticut, and Baltimore, Maryland, prior to 1795, when he entered the Litchfield Law School. After his admission to the bar, in 1798 he became associated with the law school's founder, Tapping Reeve as professor in that institution. In the same year, he married Sally McCurdy Tracy, daughter of Senator Uriah Tracy, with whom he had nine children.

Gould was raised in 1816 to the office of judge of the Supreme Court of Connecticut, from which he was displaced in 1818 by the adoption of the new constitution. In 1820, Gould became superintendent of the law school, and after the death of Reeve, in 1823, continued to conduct it until 1833. He published Principles of Pleading in Civil Actions (New York, 1832; new ed. by Franklin F. Heard, Albany, 1887).

His son Edward Sherman Gould was a noted critic, author and translator. Another son, John W. Gould (5 November 1814 – 1838), was also an author who wrote sea tales and sketches until his death at sea. Sons William Tracy Gould, James Reeve Gould, and George Gould all attended the Litchfield Law School. William Tracy Gould would later move to Georgia where he established a law school based upon the Litchfield model.

Gould's descendant, Col. John W. Barnes, bequeathed the Gould family estate in trust to USC (University of Southern California) Law in 1940. Two decades later, the law program of USC was renamed to the "Gould School of Law", continuing James Gould's legacy.

Another descendant (his great-grandson) was noted New York Times TV critic, Jack Gould.
