= Kevin L. Johnson =

American politician

Member of the South Carolina Senate from the 36th district
- In office 2012–2024
- Succeeded by: Jeff Zell

Member of the South Carolina House of Representatives from the 64th district
- In office 2011–2012
- Preceded by: Cathy Harvin
- Succeeded by: Robert L. Ridgeway III

Personal details
- Born: September 27, 1960 (age 66) Fort Campbell, Kentucky, U.S.
- Party: Democratic
- Spouse: Gloria Richardson
- Children: 3, including Kimberly Johnson
- Education: University of South Carolina

Kevin L. Johnson (born September 27, 1960) is an American politician who was a Democratic member of the South Carolina Senate, representing the 36th District from 2012 to 2024.
