= Mark Sanford =

American politician and author (born 1960)

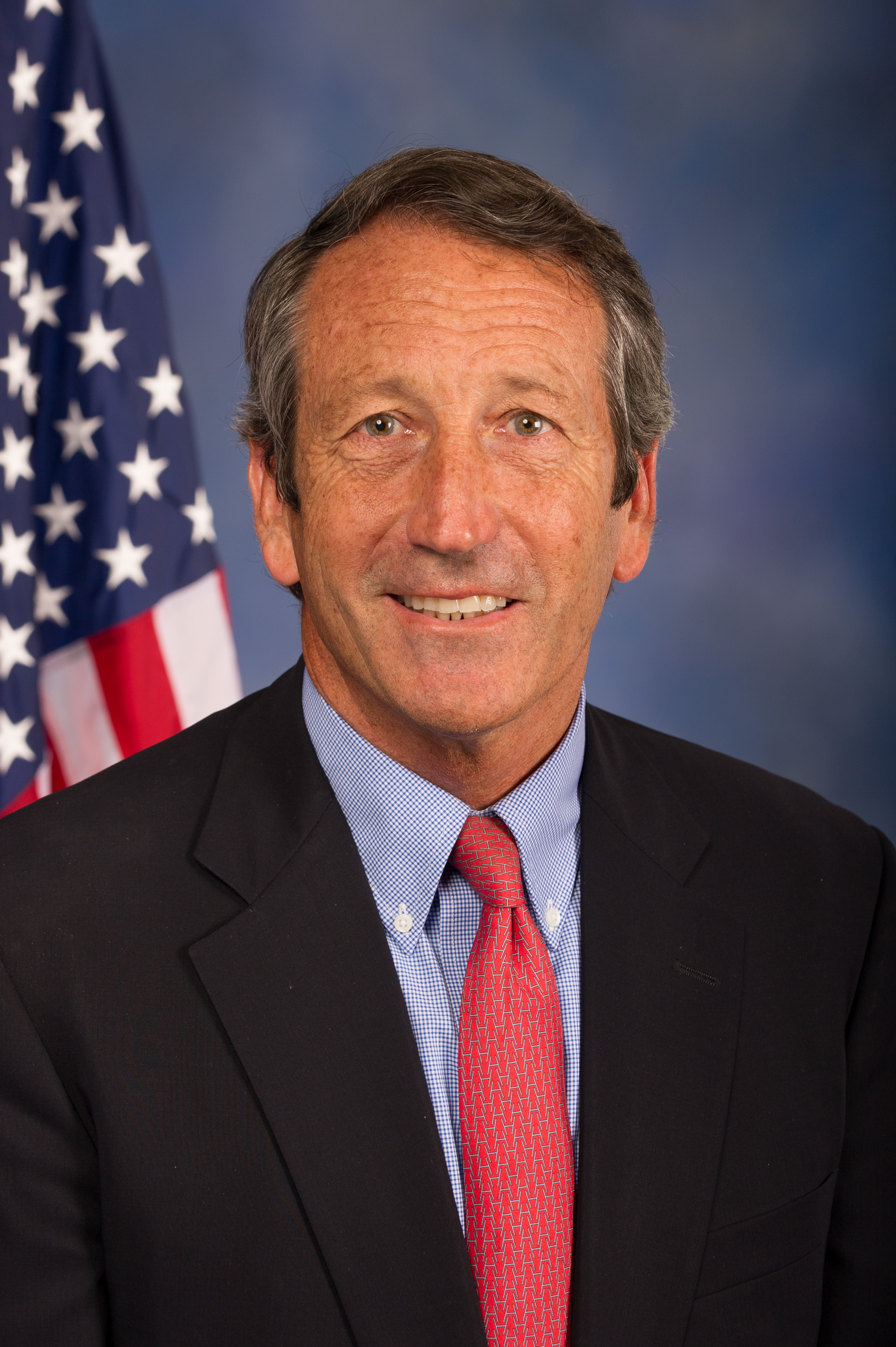
- Official portrait, 2013

Member of the U.S. House of Representatives from South Carolina's 1st district
- In office May 7, 2013 (Note: Sanford's official service begins on the date of the special election, while he was not sworn in until May 15, 2013.) – January 3, 2019
- Preceded by: Tim Scott
- Succeeded by: Joe Cunningham
- In office January 3, 1995 – January 3, 2001
- Preceded by: Arthur Ravenel
- Succeeded by: Henry Brown

115th Governor of South Carolina
- In office January 15, 2003 – January 12, 2011
- Lieutenant: André Bauer
- Preceded by: Jim Hodges
- Succeeded by: Nikki Haley

Personal details
- Born: Marshall Clement Sanford Jr. May 28, 1960 (age 66) Fort Lauderdale, Florida, U.S.
- Party: Republican
- Spouse: Jenny Sullivan (m. 1989; div. 2010)
- Children: 4
- Education: Furman University (BA); University of Virginia (MBA)
- Website: Official website

Military service
- Branch/service: United States Air Force
- Years of service: 2003–2013
- Rank: Captain
- Unit: 315th Airlift Wing; 315th Aeromedical Evacuation Squadron; Charleston Air Force Base; Air Force Reserve Command
- Sanford's voice Sanford on his legislation, the REAL ID Privacy Protection Act. Recorded January 31, 2017

Marshall Clement "Mark" Sanford Jr. (born May 28, 1960) is an American politician, real estate developer and author who served as the U.S. representative for South Carolina's 1st congressional district from 1995 to 2001 and from 2013 to 2019, and as the 115th governor of South Carolina from 2003 to 2011. He is a member of the Republican Party.

Sanford was first elected to Congress in 1994, serving three terms in the House of Representatives. He ran for governor in 2002, defeating Democratic incumbent Jim Hodges, and was re-elected in 2006. As governor, Sanford attempted to reject $700 million in stimulus funds for South Carolina from the federal Recovery Act passed in 2009, but the South Carolina Supreme Court ruled that only the state legislature had the authority to accept or decline the funds.

Sanford successfully ran for Congress in a 2013 special election for his old seat. He ran for re-election in 2018 but lost renomination in the Republican primary to Katie Arrington. In 2019, Sanford launched a 2020 presidential campaign, seeking to challenge incumbent President Donald Trump for the Republican nomination, but shortly dropped out of the race. In 2026, he filed to run for his old seat, but later withdrew. After Senator Lindsey Graham died, Sanford launched a bid for the Republican special Senate nomination for that seat, failing to make the runoff by placing fourth.

== Early life and family ==
Marshall Clement Sanford Jr. was born in Fort Lauderdale, Florida, to Marshall Clement Sanford, a cardiothoracic surgeon, and Margaret Elise "Peggy" Pitz. His family was fairly well-to-do, but slept in the same room to conserve electricity. Before his senior year of high school, Sanford moved with his family from Fort Lauderdale to the 3,000-acre (1,200 ha) Coosaw Plantation near Beaufort, South Carolina. Sanford attained the rank of Eagle Scout in the Boy Scouts of America.

Sanford received a Bachelor of Arts degree in business from Furman University in 1983 and a Master of Business Administration degree from Darden Graduate School of Business Administration at the University of Virginia in 1988.

Sanford married Jenny Sullivan in November 1989. The couple had four sons.

Sanford founded Norton and Sanford Real Estate Investment, a leasing and brokerage company, in 1992.

In June 2009, after disappearing from the state for a week, Sanford revealed that he had engaged in an extramarital affair. He had told his staff that he was going hiking on the Appalachian Trail, but actually went to visit his mistress, Maria Belén Chapur, in Argentina. The affair made national headlines, leading to his censure by the South Carolina General Assembly and his resignation as chair of the Republican Governors Association.

Ryan Lizza alleged that Sanford had an affair with reporter Olivia Nuzzi in 2020. Lizza was formerly engaged to Nuzzi.

== U.S. House of Representatives (1995–2001) ==
=== Elections ===
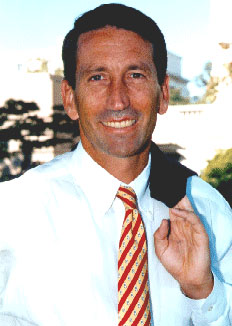
Sanford in 1999

1994

In 1994, Sanford entered the Republican primary for the Charleston-based 1st Congressional District in the United States House of Representatives. The seat had come open after four-term Republican incumbent Arthur Ravenel declined to seek re-election in his ultimately unsuccessful run for governor. Despite having never run for office before, Sanford finished second in a crowded primary behind Van Hipp Jr., a former George H. W. Bush administration official and former chairman of the South Carolina Republican Party. Sanford defeated Van Hipp in the runoff. He then easily defeated Democratic state representative Robert A. Barber Jr. in the November general election, winning by 66.3% to 32.4%.

1996–1998

Sanford was unopposed by Democratic candidates in 1996 and 1998. In 1996, he beat Joseph Innella of the Natural Law Party by 96.36% to 3.55%. He beat Innella again in 1998, this time by 91% to 8.9%.

=== Tenure ===
While in Congress, Sanford was recognized as its most fiscally conservative member by the Cato Institute. He was also recognized by Citizens Against Government Waste, as well as the National Tax Payers Union, for his efforts to rein in government spending and reduce the national deficit. He garnered a lifetime rating of 92 from the American Conservative Union.

He was known for voting against bills that otherwise received unanimous support. For example, he voted against a bill that preserved sites linked to the Underground Railroad. He voted against pork barrel projects even when they benefited his own district; in 1997, he voted against a defense appropriations bill that included funds for Charleston's harbor. Seeing himself as a "citizen-legislator", he did not run for reelection in 2000, in keeping with a promise to serve only three terms in the House.

=== Committee assignments ===
- Committee on International Relations
- Committee on Government Reform
- Committee on Science
- Joint Economic Committee

== Governor of South Carolina (2003–2011) ==
=== 2002 election ===
In 2002, just before announcing he would run for governor, Sanford joined the Air Force Reserve. He entered the gubernatorial election of 2002; he first defeated Lt. Gov. Bob Peeler in the Republican primary and then defeated the Democratic incumbent, Jim Hodges, in the general election, by a margin of 53% to 47% to become the 115th governor of South Carolina. In accordance with South Carolina law, Sanford was elected separately from the state's Republican lieutenant governor, Andre Bauer. Sanford and Bauer's wins gave the Republicans full control of state government for the first time since Reconstruction.

=== First term (2003-2007) ===
In 2003, after becoming governor, Sanford attended two weeks of training with the Air Force Reserve in Alabama with his unit, the 315th Aeromedical Evacuation Squadron. While in training in 2003, Sanford did not transfer power to Bauer, saying he would be in regular contact with his office, and would transfer authority in writing only if he were called to active duty.

Sanford sometimes had a contentious relationship with the South Carolina General Assembly, even though it was dominated by his party for his entire tenure. During his administration, governmental power was largely held by three members of the General Assembly: Senators Hugh Leatherman and Glenn F. McConnell and House Speaker Bobby Harrell. The Republican-led state House of Representatives overrode 105 of Sanford's 106 budget vetoes on May 26, 2004. The following day, Sanford brought live pigs, who subsequently defecated on the House floor, into the House chamber as a visual protest against "pork projects."

Sanford rejected the Assembly's entire budget on June 13, 2006. Had this veto stood, the state government would have shut down on July 1. He explained his veto as being the only way to get the cuts he desired, and that using the line-item veto would have been inadequate as well as impossible. However, in a special session the following day, both houses dismissed Sanford's call for reform by overriding his veto–effectively restoring their original budget.

In 2003, Sanford sought to reform the state's public college system. Sanford has criticized these schools as focusing too much on separately creating research institutions and not on educating the young adults of South Carolina. Sanford also suggested that they combine some programs as a means of curbing tuition increases. The schools did not respond positively to this suggestion, however, causing Sanford to remark that "if any institution ultimately feels uncomfortable with our push toward coordination, they can exit the system and go private."

Sanford's first term included other controversies. A Time magazine article in November 2005, critical of Sanford, said that some "fear his thrift has brought the state's economy to a standstill."

According to Survey USA, Sanford's approval ratings ranged from 47% to 55% during 2006.

=== 2006 election ===
His campaign for re-election in 2006 began by Sanford winning the June 13 Republican Primary over Oscar Lovelace, a family physician from Prosperity, with 65% of the vote to Lovelace's 35%. His Democratic competitor in the November elections was state senator Tommy Moore, whom Sanford beat 55% to 45%.

On Election Day, Sanford was not allowed to vote in his home precinct because he did not have his voter registration card. He was obliged to go to a voter registration office to get a new registration card. "I hope everybody else out there is as determined to vote as I was today", he said. Sanford's driver's license had a Columbia address, but Sanford was trying to vote at his home precinct in Sullivan's Island. According to WAGT in Augusta, Georgia (whose service area includes part of South Carolina) Sanford declared that it would be his last campaign.

=== Second term (2007-2011) ===
In dissent with the Republican Party of South Carolina, Sanford opposed the faith-based license plates his state offers, marketed largely to the state's conservative evangelical citizens. After the law passed without his signature, he wrote: "It is my personal view that the largest proclamation of one's faith ought to be in how one lives his life." The Base Load Review act which ultimately led to the Nukegate scandal, the largest business failure in South Carolina's, was also passed without Sanford's signature.

After the passage of the American Recovery and Reinvestment Act of 2009 (known as the stimulus), which Sanford strongly opposed and publicly criticized before and after its passage by Congress and presidential signing, Sanford initially indicated he might not accept all of the funds allotted by the spending law to South Carolina. He was criticized by many Democrats and some moderate Republicans, both in his state and outside it, who noted South Carolina's 9.5% unemployment rate (one of the highest in the country) and complained that Sanford was not doing enough to improve economic conditions in his state, which could be alleviated by the stimulus money. Arnold Schwarzenegger, the Republican governor of California, suggested that if Sanford or other governors rejected their portion of stimulus funds, he would be happy to take them instead.

On March 11, 2009, Sanford became the first United States governor to formally reject a portion of the federal stimulus money earmarked by Congress for the state of South Carolina. Sanford compromised to accept the federal money on condition that the state legislature provide matching funds to pay down the South Carolina state debt.

Sanford persuaded state legislator Nikki Haley to run as his successor, and campaigned on her behalf.

=== 2009 disappearance and extramarital affair ===
From June 18 until June 24, 2009, the whereabouts of Sanford were unknown to the public, his wife, and the State Law Enforcement Division (which provides security for all South Carolina governors). The mystery surrounding Sanford's whereabouts garnered nationwide news coverage; his absence was first reported by Jim Davenport of the Associated Press. Lieutenant Governor André Bauer announced that he could not "take lightly" that Sanford's staff had not communicated with him "for more than four days, and that no one, including his own family, knows his whereabouts."

Before his disappearance, Sanford told his staff that he would be hiking on the Appalachian Trail. While he was gone, he did not answer 15 cell phone calls from his chief of staff; he also failed to call his family on Father's Day.

Reporter Gina Smith of The State (the daily newspaper of Columbia, South Carolina) intercepted Sanford when he arrived at Hartsfield–Jackson Atlanta International Airport on a flight from Argentina. Several hours later, after learning that evidence of his true whereabouts was being swiftly discovered by the media, Sanford held a news conference during which he admitted to adultery. In emotional interviews with the Associated Press over two days, Sanford said he would die "knowing that I had met my soul mate." Sanford also said that he "crossed the lines" with a handful of other women during 20 years of marriage, but not as far as he did with his mistress. "There were a handful of instances wherein I crossed the lines I shouldn't have crossed as a married man, but never crossed the ultimate line", he said.

On June 25, La Nación, a Buenos Aires newspaper, identified Sanford's mistress as María Belén Chapur, a 43-year-old divorced mother of two with a university degree in international relations who lived in Buenos Aires. Earlier, The State published details of e-mails between Sanford and a woman only identified as "Maria". Sanford met Chapur at a dance in Uruguay in 2001 and admitted that a more intimate relationship with her had begun in 2008.

Sanford's wife had become aware of her husband's infidelities approximately five months before the scandal broke, and the two had sought marriage counseling. Jenny Sanford said that she had requested a trial separation about two weeks before his disappearance.

Sanford told reporters that months before his affair became public, he had sought counsel at a controversial religious organization called The Family, of which he became a member when he was a representative in Washington, D.C. from 1995 to 2001.

According to Survey USA, Sanford's approval ratings in South Carolina after his admission of infidelity (6–24–09) showed that "60% think the governor should resign. 34% feel he should remain in office."

==== Impeachment proceedings ====
On August 25, state representatives Nathan Ballentine and Gary Simrill met with Sanford and warned him that the state legislature would impeach him if he did not resign. Ballentine, an ally of Sanford's, said afterward, "I told him the writing is on the wall. ...he could put an end to it all, but if he doesn't, members of the House will take things into their hands." Sanford still declined to resign.

On August 28, The Washington Times reported that Republican lawmakers in South Carolina were "laying plans" for a special legislative session on whether to impeach Sanford. Two bills of impeachment were being prepared, with bipartisan support in the state legislature.

An impeachment resolution introduced in October failed to advance when a Democratic legislator objected on procedural grounds, and the Republican speaker of the House concurred. A month later, the resolution was successfully introduced and it was announced that an ad hoc committee would begin drafting articles of impeachment starting on November 24. Meanwhile, the Ethics Commission formally charged Sanford with 37 violations.

On December 3, during its third public hearing on the matter, the ad hoc committee unanimously voted to remove the vast majority of charges from the investigation, stating that they did not warrant "overturning an election." On December 9, the committee voted 6–1 against impeachment, stating that the legislature had better things to do.

==== Censure ====
On December 15, 2009, the South Carolina House Judiciary Committee voted unanimously to censure Sanford. The full South Carolina House of Representatives passed the resolution by a vote of 102–11 in January 2010.

==== Other fallout from scandal ====
Sanford resigned as Chairman of the Republican Governors Association following the disclosure of his affair. He was swiftly succeeded by Mississippi governor Haley Barbour. In a June 29 email to members of his political action committee, Sanford said he had no intention of resigning as governor.

After his affair was revealed in June 2009, Sanford said: "There's been a lot of speculation and innuendo on whether or not public money were used to advance my admitted unfaithfulness. To be very clear: no public money was ever used in connection with this." After a Freedom of Information Act request was filed, Sanford eventually chose to reimburse taxpayers for expenses he had incurred one year earlier with his mistress in Argentina. He said, "I made a mistake while I was there in meeting with the woman who I was unfaithful to my wife with. That has raised some very legitimate concerns and questions, and as such, I am going to reimburse the state for the full cost of the Argentina leg of this trip." On August 9, 2009, the AP reported that Sanford may have violated state law by other inappropriate use of state planes, including using a state plane to get a haircut.

After telling Vogue magazine that her husband was having a "midlife crisis," Sanford's wife, Jenny Sanford, moved out of the South Carolina Governor’s Mansion with the couple's four sons, returning to the family home on Sullivan’s Island. On December 11, 2009, she announced that she was filing for divorce, calling it a "sad and painful process." The divorce was finalized in March 2010. A stipulation within the divorce papers required that while on the Sanford family's Coosaw plantation, "no airplanes will be flown at children." The papers also noted that Sanford liked to "unwind" by digging holes on the property with his hydraulic excavator.

In August 2012, Sanford became engaged to Chapur. The engagement was subsequently broken off in September 2014.

In September 2014, Jenny Sanford unsuccessfully petitioned Judge Daniel Martin Jr. to require that Mark Sanford undergo a psychiatric exam and take parenting and anger management classes. Judge Martin ordered the parties to go to mediation.

=== Veto record ===
During his 2003–2011 gubernatorial term, Sanford vetoed 278 bills, 213 (77%) of which were overridden by the legislature.

Sanford's veto record
Legislative veto action	Total	% of total
Sustained	59	21%
Overridden	213	77%
Partial/Certain Items sustained	6	2%
Total vetoes	278	-

== Hiatus from politics (2011–2012) ==
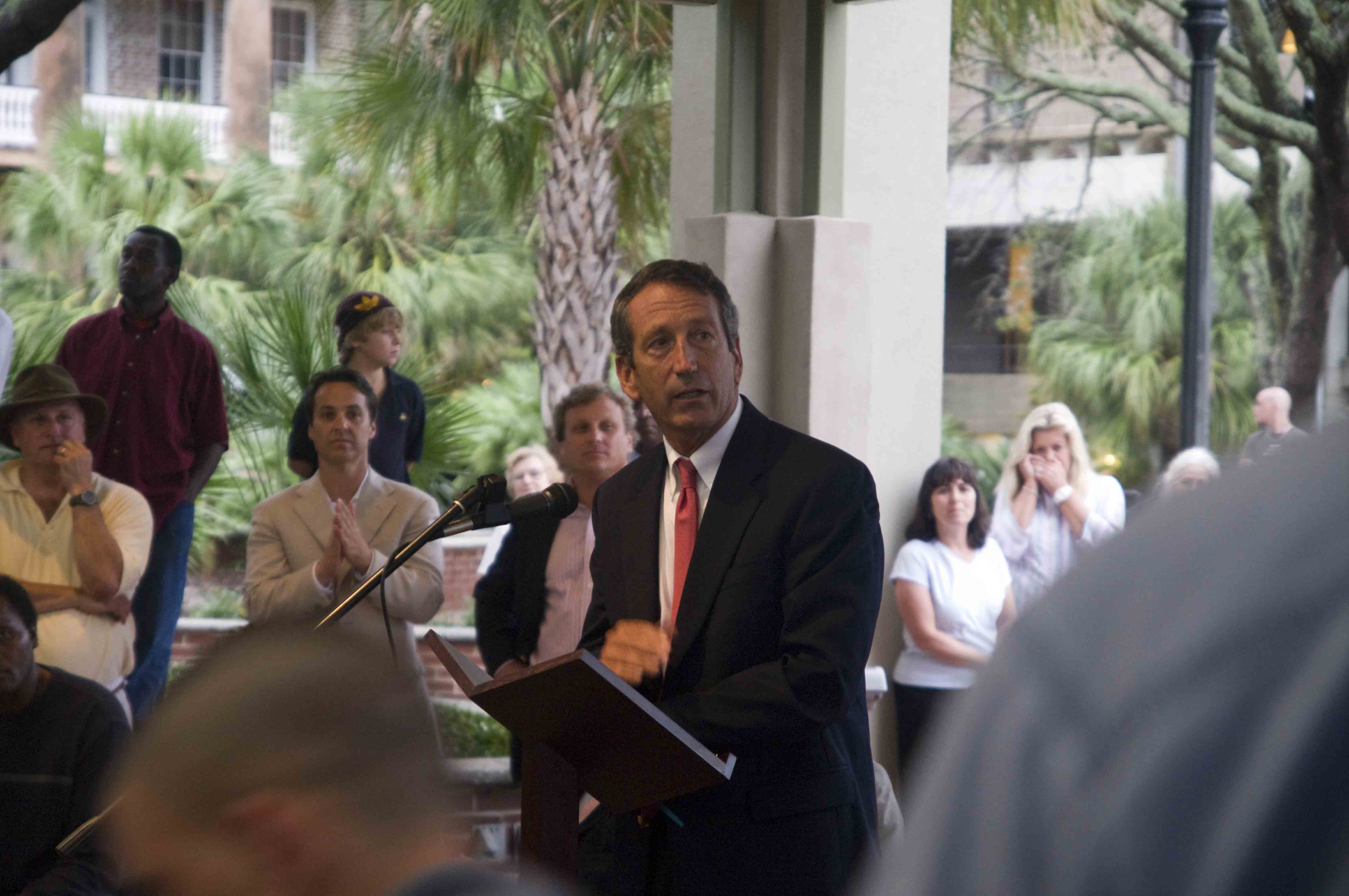
Then-Governor Mark Sanford speaking at an event in September 2010.

Following completion of his term as governor in January 2011, Sanford moved to his family farm in Beaufort County, South Carolina, and later moved to a condominium in Charleston, South Carolina. He has described this as a very quiet and spiritual time, and developed a Buddhist/Christian life approach including a daily quiet time, practicing mindfulness, and emphasizing everyone's 'shared human experience.'

In October 2011, Sanford was hired as a paid political contributor for Fox News Channel.

== Return to House of Representatives (2013–2019) ==
=== Elections ===
==== 2013 special election ====
In December 2012, CNN reported that Sanford was considering a bid to retake his congressional seat. The previous holder, fellow Republican Tim Scott, had been appointed to the United States Senate by Governor Nikki Haley after the resignation of Senator Jim DeMint. On December 22, 2012, Sanford sent an email to supporters, confirming rumors that he intended to run for Congress in 2013.

During his prior years as a representative on Capitol Hill, he was often identified as an ally of libertarian/conservative Ron Paul while they served in the House together.

Sanford formally launched his bid for Congress in early 2013. He quickly became a front-runner in a crowded field of 16 Republican candidates, because of his name recognition. On April 2, 2013, Sanford won his Republican House primary runoff against Curtis Bostic, a former Charleston County Councilman.

On April 17, 2013, the National Republican Congressional Committee pulled support from the Sanford campaign in the wake of revelations that Jenny Sanford had filed a trespassing complaint against him on February 4. According to the complaint, Jenny Sanford had caught her former husband sneaking out of her home in Sullivan's Island, without her knowledge of his presence, using his cellphone as a flashlight. Under the terms of their divorce agreement, neither Mark nor Jenny Sanford may come to the other's house without permission—a condition Jenny Sanford alleged that Mark Sanford had flouted on numerous occasions despite Jenny Sanford filing a "no trespass" letter with the Sullivan's Island Police Department. In a statement, Mark Sanford admitted that he had gone to the house to watch the second half of Super Bowl XLVII with his son. He claimed to have tried to contact Jenny beforehand but was unable to do so. Jenny Sanford filed the complaint the next morning. Several Republican operatives said that they were upset Sanford had known about this complaint for some time and failed to disclose it.

Sanford was endorsed by FreedomWorks, South Carolina governor Nikki Haley, U.S. representative and House speaker John Boehner, state senator Tom Davis, former South Carolina state treasurer Thomas Ravenel, perennial candidate Ben Frasier, former U.S. representative from Texas Ron Paul, and U.S. senator from Kentucky Rand Paul. On May 1, 2013, U.S. senator and former U.S. representative Tim Scott and U.S. senator Lindsey Graham endorsed Sanford. Pornographer Larry Flynt also endorsed him, saying "His open embrace of his mistress in the name of love, breaking his sacred marriage vows, was an act of bravery that has drawn my support."

On May 7, 2013, Sanford was once again elected to the U.S. House of Representatives with 54.04% of the vote, defeating economist and author Elizabeth Colbert Busch.

==== 2014 ====
Sanford was unopposed for re-election in 2014.

==== 2016 ====
In 2016, Sanford was renominated by the Republican Party for another Congressional term, defeating his sole primary opponent, state representative Jenny Horne, with 55.61% of the vote, and in the November general election was re-elected by a margin of 58.56% to a total of 36.83% for his major opponent, Dimitri Cherry, who was nominated on the lines of the Democratic, Working Families and Green Parties, as South Carolina is one of the states practicing electoral fusion. (Other candidates received approximately 4.6% of the vote.)

==== 2018 ====
Sanford was criticized by President Donald Trump via Twitter for being "very unhelpful," and "nothing but trouble" hours before polls closed on the day of the June 12th Republican primary. Trump also endorsed state representative Katie Arrington as the Republican nominee for Sanford's seat. Arrington defeated Sanford in the Republican primary by garnering 50.5% of the vote, to Sanford's 46.5%. Sanford became the second Republican to lose renomination to the House of Representatives in the 2018 election cycle.

After his loss, The New York Times wrote, "Mark Sanford of South Carolina found out the hard way, in his surprise primary defeat" that "having a conservative voting record is less important than demonstrating total loyalty to Mr. Trump." On November 6, 2018, Democrat Joe Cunningham was elected as his successor, defeating Arrington in an upset election. Sanford became a teaching fellow at the University of Chicago Institute of Politics after the 2018 election.

=== Tenure ===
Sanford was sworn in on May 15, 2013.

On June 5, 2014, Sanford introduced the TSA Office of Inspection Accountability Act of 2014 (H.R. 4803; 113th Congress), a bill that would direct the Inspector General of the Department of Homeland Security (DHS) to review the data and methods that the Transportation Security Administration (TSA) uses to classify personnel as law enforcement officers and to reclassify, as necessary, any staff of the Office of Inspection that are currently misclassified according to the results of that review. Sanford said that "even though there are federal standards in place that lay out how employees qualify for higher wages, the Transportation Security Administration pays some of their employees more for jobs they're not doing. That wouldn't make sense anywhere outside of government and our bill would help fix that problem by clarifying those employees' responsibilities." According to Sanford, accurately reclassifying employees who do not spent at least 50 percent of the time on law enforcement activities and putting them on an accurate pay scale would save the government $17 million a year.

Sanford posted lengthy remarks on his Facebook page on September 12, 2014, regarding Jenny Sanford's "legal machinations surrounding the custody of their children." His remarks on Facebook on that date were longer than the total of all his 2014 speeches on the floor of the House of Representatives.

Despite the fact that Sanford supported Donald Trump in the 2016 presidential election, he became "one of the president's most eloquent critics" early in Trump's tenure, according to The Washington Post. According to NPR, "Sanford hasn't been shy at voicing his disgust with Trump and his distaste for the president's brash style of politics and frequent bending of the truth." In a February 2017 interview, Sanford said that Trump "at some level... represents the antithesis, or the undoing, of everything I thought I knew about politics, preparation and life." According to an analysis by FiveThirtyEight, only four Republican House members voted less frequently with Trump than Sanford.

Sanford criticized President Donald Trump's 2017 executive order to temporarily curtail Muslim immigration until better screening methods were devised. He stated that "I'm hearing a voice of concern that things are moving from weird to reckless in their view. And that even if you're going to enact this policy, the way in which it was done just seems bizarre." In early 2017, Sanford signed a letter urging Congress to request Donald Trump's tax returns so that they could be reviewed in a closed session of Congress to determine whether they could be released to the public. In his 2018 re-election campaign ads, Sanford boasted of having voted with the president "89 percent of the time." He also expressed support for Trump's wall on the US-Mexico border.

On May 4, 2017, Sanford voted to repeal the Patient Protection and Affordable Care Act (Obamacare) and pass the American Health Care Act.

=== Committee assignments ===
- Committee on the Budget
- Committee on Homeland Security
  - Subcommittee on Emergency Preparedness, Response, and Communications
  - Subcommittee on Transportation Security
- Committee on Transportation and Infrastructure
  - Subcommittee on Coast Guard and Maritime Transportation
  - Subcommittee on Economic Development, Public Buildings and Emergency Management
  - Subcommittee on Water Resources and Environment

=== Caucus memberships ===
- Liberty Caucus
- Freedom Caucus
- Republican Study Committee
- United States Congressional International Conservation Caucus
- Climate Solutions Caucus

== Involvement in presidential elections ==
=== 2008 ===
In 2006, before the midterm elections, some commentators discussed the possibility of Sanford running for president. He said that he would not run, and claimed that his re-election bid would be his last election, win or lose. After Super Tuesday in 2008, Sanford received some mention as a potential running mate for the presumptive Republican presidential candidate, John McCain. Sanford publicly aligned himself with McCain in a March 15, 2008, piece in The Wall Street Journal. Likening the presidential race to a football game at halftime, Sanford noted that he "sat out the first half, not endorsing a candidate...But I'm now stepping onto the field and going to work to help John McCain. It's important that conservatives do the same."

On January 11, 2008, shortly before the South Carolina presidential primaries (R Jan 19, D Jan 26), Sanford published a guest column in the Columbia newspaper The State. In the article, "Obama's Symbolism Here", Sanford wrote, "I won't be voting for Barack Obama for president", but noted the "historical burden" borne by South Carolinians on the topic of race. He advised voters in South Carolina to take note of the symbolism of Obama's early success, with the knowledge that South Carolina was a segregated state less than fifty years earlier, and discouraged voting either for or against Obama on the basis of his race.

On a January 18, 2008 interview with CNN's Wolf Blitzer, Sanford discussed his Obama article. Wolf Blitzer asked, "Give us your mind-set. Why did you think it was so important to write this piece right now at this critical moment?" Sanford responded, "Well, it plays into a larger conversation that we're having as a family of South Carolinians on, in fact, the [constitutional] structure of our government." Blitzer also showed Sanford clips of recent comments made by John McCain and Mike Huckabee about the Confederate battle flag and asked Sanford, "All right, two different positions, obviously. Who's right in this?" Sanford responded, "Well, it depends who you talk to." Sanford elaborated that "if you were to talk to the vast majority of South Carolinians, they would say that we do not need to be debating where the Confederate flag is or is not."

Sanford attracted derision in the liberal blogosphere and among pundits and analysts on the left for a gaffe during an interview with CNN's Blitzer on July 13, 2008, when he had difficulty answering a question about differences between Senator McCain and incumbent President George W. Bush on economic policy. "I'm drawing a blank, and I hate when I do that, especially on television", joked Sanford.

=== 2012 ===
As early as January 2008, there had been anticipation that Sanford would run for President in 2012, and online support groups had sprung up on social networks like Facebook for a Sanford ticket.

At the time, the governor neither ruled out nor expressly hinted at a run. Further boosting Sanford's profile in advance of a potential candidacy, he was elected as Chairman of the Republican Governors Association in November 2008 and was cited by Michael S. Steele, the chairman of the Republican Party as one of four "rising stars" in the GOP (alongside governors Bobby Jindal of Louisiana, Tim Pawlenty of Minnesota and Sarah Palin of Alaska) in February 2009. Sanford also received early support for a presidential run from the Republican Liberty Caucus.

On February 22, 2009, Sanford declined to rule out a possible presidential bid in 2012, though he professed to have no current plans to run for national office.

Washington Post blogger Chris Cillizza said that the revelation of the extramarital affair in June 2009 ended Sanford's chances of being a serious candidate in 2012.

On January 4, 2010, Sanford stated, "If there's anything that's abundantly clear, it's that I ain't running for president," and indicated that he would enter the private sector after his last 11 months as governor.

=== 2016 ===
Sanford did not endorse Donald Trump in the 2016 presidential election.

=== 2020 presidential campaign ===
On July 16, 2019, Sanford confirmed that he was interested in challenging Trump for the presidency in 2020, citing "his alarm over the nation's finances" as a reason for doing so. He said he would decide on a potential candidacy by September 2, 2019, but postponed it at the last minute because of Hurricane Dorian. On September 8, 2019, he formally launched his campaign and declared his candidacy for the Republican nomination on Fox News Sunday.

In September, Sanford made several campaign stops in his home state of South Carolina (including Greenville, Columbia, and Mount Pleasant) wherein he "debated" with a cardboard cutout of Donald Trump. This was in reaction to the South Carolina Republican Party's decision to forgo a Republican primary in that state. On September 19, Sanford held his first campaign stop in the early primary state of New Hampshire. This was followed by a four-day swing through Iowa that lasted through September 25.

On October 16, 2019, Sanford formally launched his campaign with a week-long, 3,500 mile road trip which started in Philadelphia. Only one person, a reporter from The Philadelphia Inquirer, showed up. The road trip was called "Kids, We’re Bankrupt and We Didn’t Even Know It," and saw Sanford holding a large check for "one trillion dollars" that he hoped would "spark a needed conversation" within the Republican Party about spending and debt.

After failing to gain traction in the race, Sanford ended his presidential bid on November 12. He blamed the ongoing impeachment inquiry against Donald Trump, saying that it "has made my goal of making the debt, deficit and spending issue a part of this presidential debate impossible right now ... nearly everything in Republican Party politics is currently viewed through the prism of impeachment."

In 2025, the writer Ryan Lizza alleged that Sanford had an affair during the 2020 campaign with Lizza's partner at the time, journalist Olivia Nuzzi.

== US House of Representatives election 2026 ==
In 2026, Sanford filed to reclaim his former South Carolina Congressional District 1 seat, vacated by incumbent Nancy Mace as she joined the South Carolina gubernatorial race. Sanford withdrew before the primary, with a public statement of plans to launch a national advocacy organization.

== US Senate race 2026 ==
With the July death of incumbent and Republican nominee Lindsey Graham, Sanford entered the US Senate race to compete in an August Republican special primary election. Sanford, placing fourth in a field of ten, failed to make the runoff eventually won by Graham's sister, Darline Graham.

== Electoral history ==
South Carolina's 1st congressional district: results 1994–2013
Year	Democratic	Votes	Pct	Republican	Votes	Pct	3rd party	Party	Votes	Pct	
1994	Robert A. Barber Jr.	47,769	32%	Mark Sanford	97,803	66%	Robert Payne	Libertarian	1,836	1%	*
1996	No candidate			Mark Sanford	138,467	96%	Joseph F. Innella	Natural Law	5,105	4%	
1998	No candidate			Mark Sanford	118,414	91%	Joseph F. Innella	Natural Law	11,586	9%	*
2013 (special)	Elizabeth Colbert-Busch	64,818	45.2%	Mark Sanford	77,466	54.0%	Eugene Platt	Green Party	690	0.5%	*
2014	No candidate			Mark Sanford	119,392	93.4%	Write-ins	-	8,423	6.6%	

*Write-in and minor candidate notes: In 1994, write-ins received 63 votes. In 1998, write-ins received 71 votes. In 2013, write-ins received 383 votes.

Republican primary results
Party	Candidate	Votes	%
Republican	Mark Sanford	122,143	38.6
Republican	Bob Peeler	119,026	37.6
Republican	Charlie Condon	49,469	15.6
Republican	Ken Wingate	12,366	3.9
Republican	Jim Miles	8,566	2.7
Republican	Reb Sutherland	2,770	0.9
Republican	Bill Branton	1,915	0.6
Total votes		316,255	100

Republican primary runoff results
Party	Candidate	Votes	%
Republican	Mark Sanford	183,820	60.1
Republican	Bob Peeler	121,881	39.9
Total votes		305,701	100

South Carolina Gubernatorial Election, 2002
Party	Candidate	Votes	%	±%
Republican	Mark Sanford	585,422	52.9	+7.6
Democratic	Jim Hodges	521,140	47.0	−6.3
No party	Write-Ins	1,163	0.1	−0.1
Majority		64,282	5.9	−2.1
Turnout		1,107,725	54.1	+1.1

Republican primary results
Party	Candidate	Votes	%
Republican	Mark Sanford (incumbent)	160,238	64.8
Republican	Oscar Lovelace	87,043	35.2
Total votes		247,281	100

South Carolina Gubernatorial Election, 2006
Party	Candidate	Votes	%	±%
Republican	Mark Sanford (incumbent)	601,868	55.1%	+2.2%
Democratic	Tommy Moore	489,076	44.8%	−2.2%
Independent	Write-ins	1,008	0.1%	
Majority		112,792	10.3%	+4.4%
Turnout		1,091,952	44.5%	−9.6%
Republican hold				

2013 Republican Primary – South Carolina's 1st Congressional District Special Election
Party	Candidate	Votes	%
Republican	Mark Sanford	19,854	36.9
Republican	Curtis Bostic	7,168	13.3
Republican	Larry Grooms	6,673	12.4
Republican	Teddy Turner	4,252	7.9
Republican	Andy Patrick	3,783	7.0
Republican	John Kuhn	3,479	6.5
Republican	Chip Limehouse	3,279	6.1
Republican	Ray Nash	2,508	4.7
Republican	Peter McCoy	867	1.6
Republican	Elizabeth Moffly	530	1.0
Republican	Tim Larkin	393	0.7
Republican	Jonathan Hoffman	360	0.7
Republican	Jeff King	211	0.4
Republican	Keith Blandford	195	0.4
Republican	Shawn Pinkston	154	0.3
Republican	Ric Bryant	87	0.2
Total votes		53,793	100

2013 Republican Primary Runoff – South Carolina's 1st Congressional District Special Election
Party	Candidate	Votes	%
Republican	Mark Sanford	26,127	56.6
Republican	Curtis Bostic	20,044	43.4
Total votes		46,171	100

South Carolina's 1st congressional district, 2013 (special)
Party	Candidate	Votes	%	±%
Republican	Mark Sanford	77,600	54.03%	−8.00%
Democratic	Elizabeth Colbert Busch	64,961	45.22%	+9.51%
Green	Eugene Platt	690	048%	N/A
n/a	Write-ins	384	0.27%	+0.20%
Total votes		143,635	100	N/A
Republican hold				

South Carolina's 1st congressional district, 2014
Party	Candidate	Votes	%
Republican	Mark Sanford (incumbent)	119,392	93.4
n/a	Write-ins	8,423	6.6
Total votes		127,815	100
Republican hold			

Republican primary results
Party	Candidate	Votes	%
Republican	Mark Sanford (incumbent)	21,299	55.6
Republican	Jenny Horne	17,001	44.4
Total votes		38,300	100

South Carolina's 1st congressional district, 2016
Party	Candidate	Votes	%
Republican	Mark Sanford (incumbent)	190,410	58.6
Democratic	Dimitri Cherny	119,779	36.8
Libertarian	Michael Grier Jr.	11,614	3.6
American	Albert Travison	2,774	0.8
n/a	Write-ins	593	0.2
Total votes		325,170	100
Republican hold			

Republican Primary Results — South Carolina's 1st congressional district, 2018
Party	Candidate	Votes	%
Republican	Katie Arrington	33,153	50.5
Republican	Mark Sanford (incumbent)	30,496	46.5
Republican	Dimitri Cherny	1,932	3.0
Total votes		65,581	100

Republican special primary results for Senate, 2026
Party	Candidate	Votes	%
Republican	Darline Graham	109,633	32.7
Republican	Ralph Norman	82,541	24.6
Republican	Russell Fry	65,714	19.6
Republican	Mark Sanford	50,025	14.9
Republican	Mark Lynch	19,862	5.9
Republican	Danny Ford II	2,814	0.8
Republican	Duke Buckner	1,580	0.5
Republican	Glenda Gail Parker	998	0.3
Republican	Samuel Shepherd	930	0.3
Republican	Mark McBride	783	0.2
Total votes		334,900	100.0

== Bibliography ==
- Sanford, Mark (August 24, 2021). Two Roads Diverged A Second Chance for the Republican Party, the Conservative Movement, the Nation― and Ourselves. Vertel Publishing. ISBN 978-1641120272.

U.S. House of Representatives
Preceded by Arthur Ravenel Jr.	Member of the U.S. House of Representatives from South Carolina's 1st congressional district 1995–2001	Succeeded by Henry E. Brown Jr.
Preceded by Tim Scott	Member of the U.S. House of Representatives from South Carolina's 1st congressional district 2013–2019	Succeeded by Joe Cunningham
Party political offices
Preceded by David Beasley	Republican nominee for Governor of South Carolina; 2002, 2006	Succeeded by Nikki Haley
Preceded by Rick Perry	Chair of the Republican Governors Association; 2008–2009	Succeeded by Haley Barbour
Political offices
Preceded by Jim Hodges	Governor of South Carolina; 2003–2011	Succeeded by Nikki Haley
U.S. order of precedence (ceremonial)
Preceded by Jim Hodges as Former Governor	Order of precedence of the United States	Succeeded by Nikki Haley as Former Governor
