= List of Elizabeth Warren 2020 presidential campaign endorsements =

Endorsements of American political campaign

- Campaign: 2020 United States presidential election (Democratic Party primaries)
- Candidate: Elizabeth Warren; U.S. Senator from Massachusetts (2013–present)
- Affiliation: Democratic Party
- Status: Announced: February 9, 2019
- Headquarters: Charlestown, Massachusetts
- Slogan(s): Dream Big, Fight Hard.

Website
- elizabethwarren.com

This is a list of notable individuals and organizations who have voiced their endorsement of Elizabeth Warren's campaign for the Democratic Party's nomination for the 2020 U.S. presidential election.

== Federal officials ==
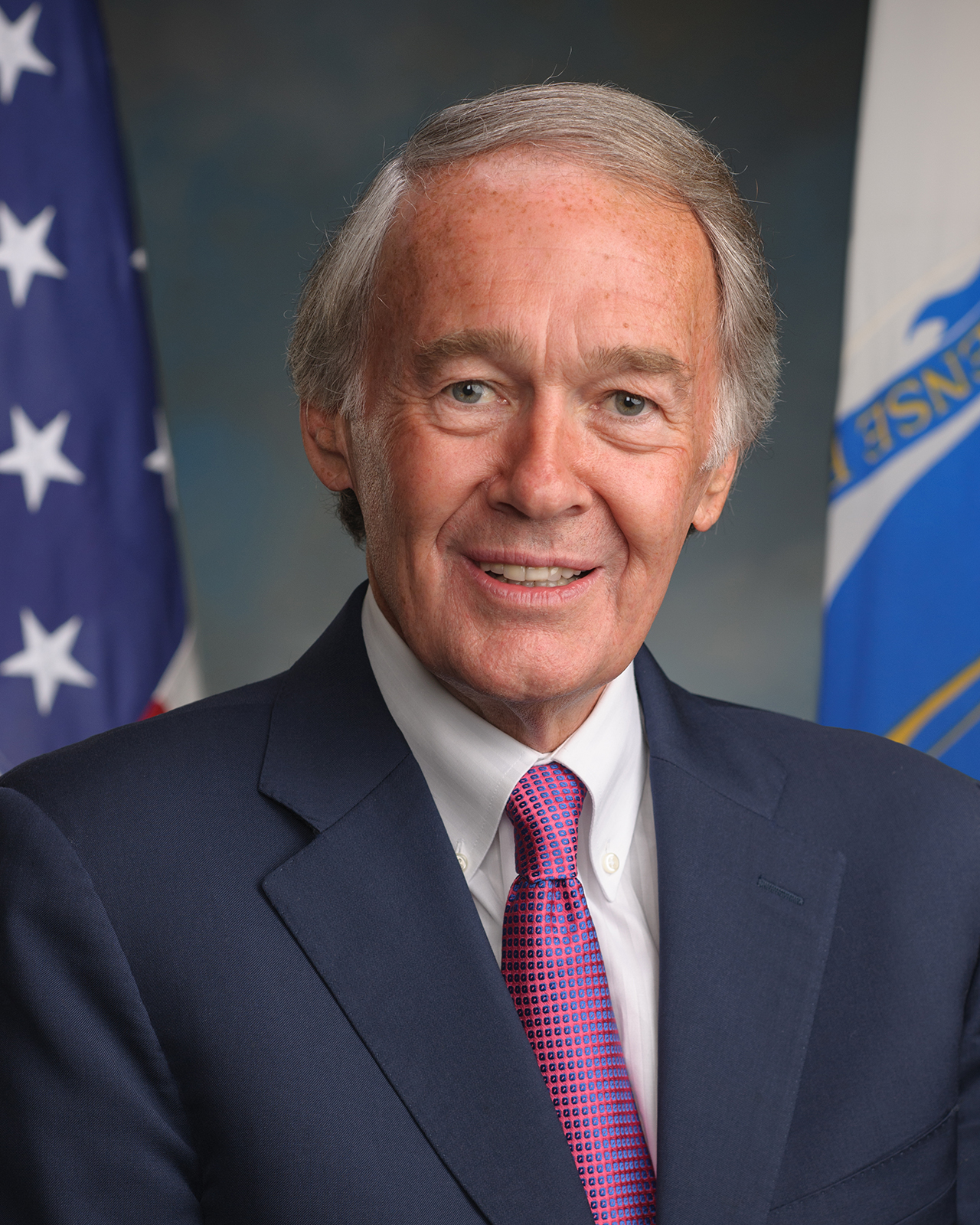
Ed Markey

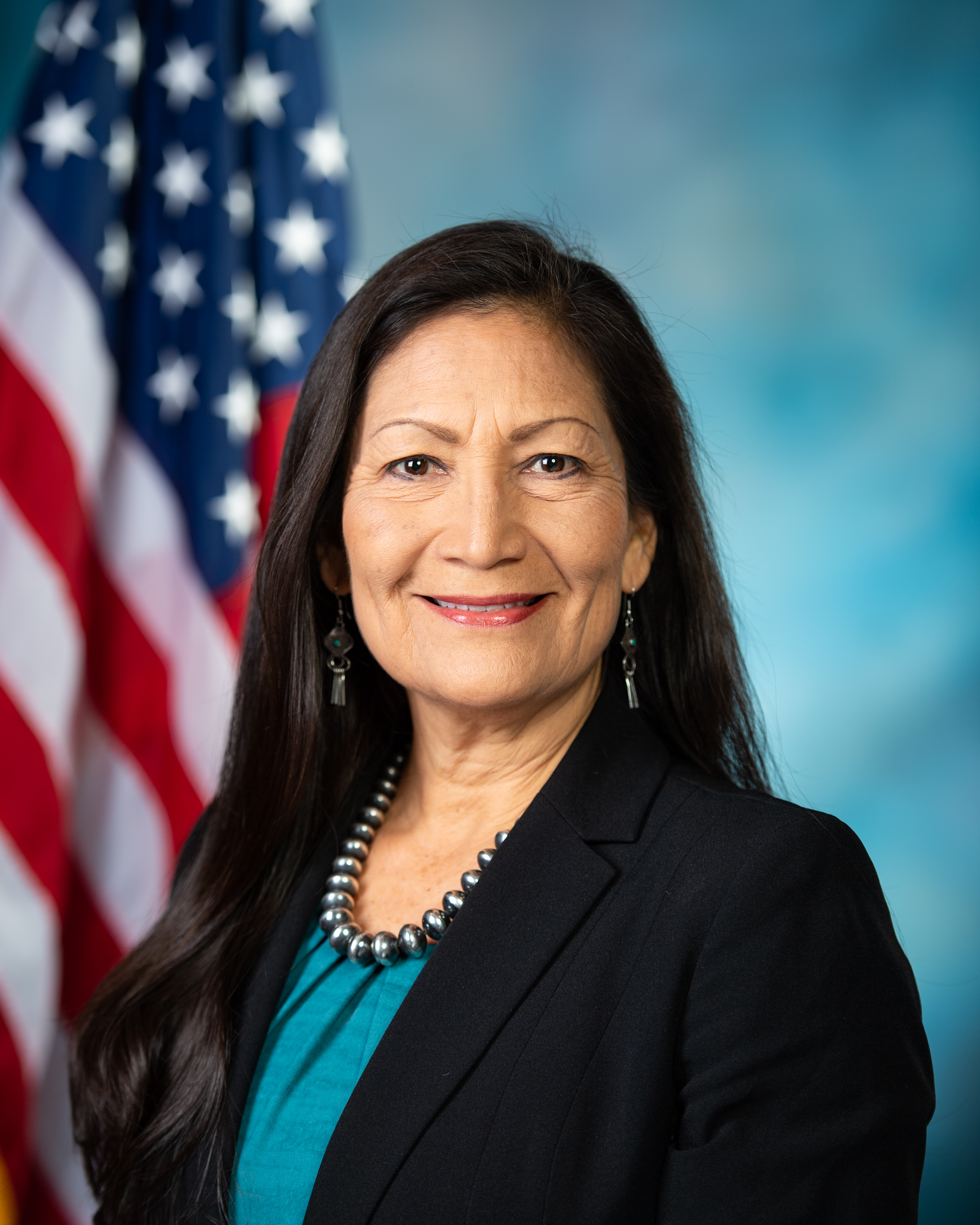
Deb Haaland

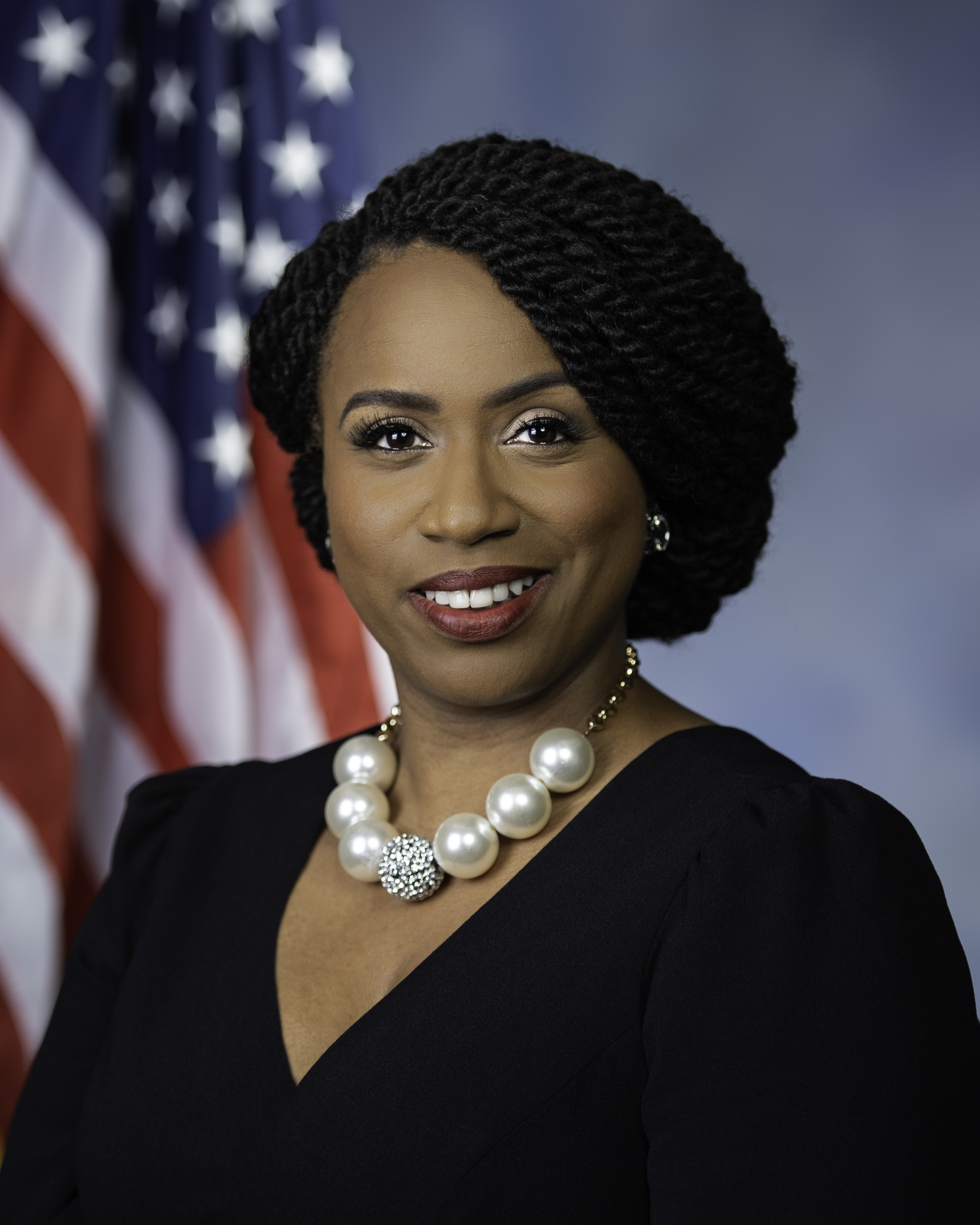
Ayanna Pressley

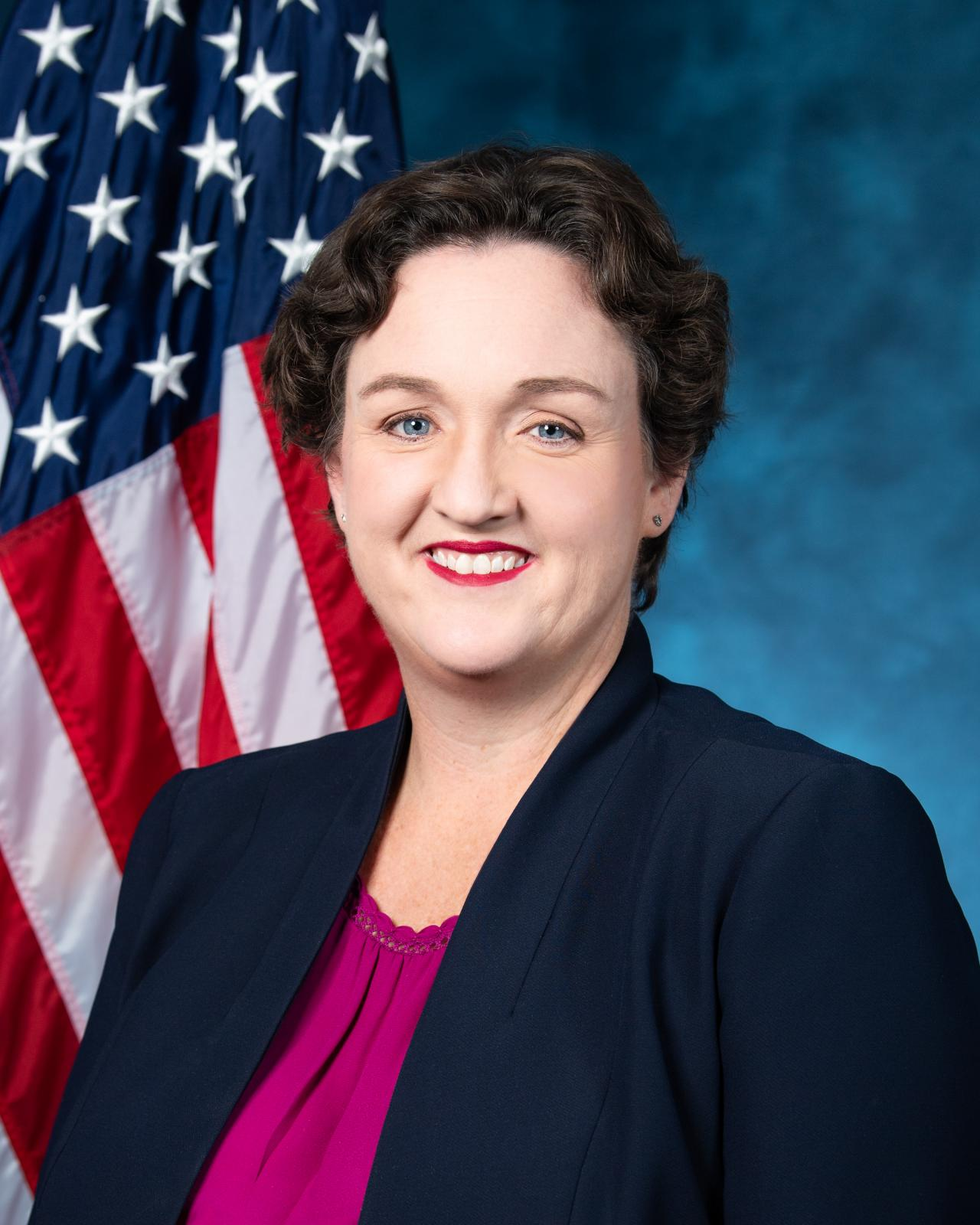
Katie Porter

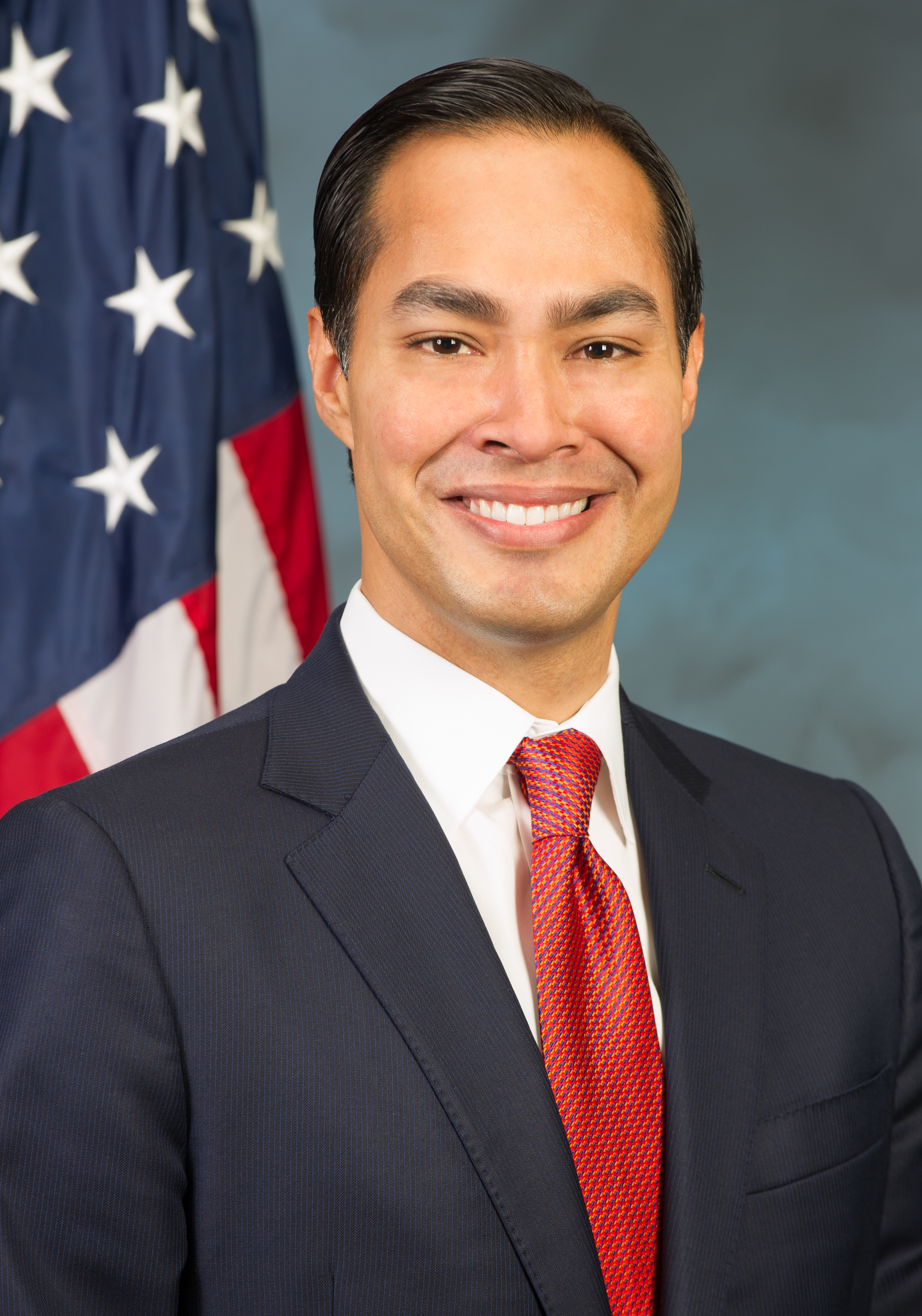
Julián Castro

=== U.S. senators ===
==== Current ====
- Ed Markey, U.S. Senator from Massachusetts (2013–present); U.S. Representative from MA-05 (1976–2013)

=== U.S. representatives ===
==== Current ====
- Joaquin Castro, U.S. Representative from TX-20 (2013–present) (previously endorsed Julian Castro)
- Katherine Clark, U.S. Representative from MA-05 (2013–present)
- Raúl Grijalva, U.S. Representative from AZ-03 (2003–2025)
- Deb Haaland, U.S. Representative from NM-01 (2019–2021)
- Joe Kennedy III, U.S. Representative from MA-04 (2013–2021)
- Andy Levin, U.S. Representative from MI-09 (2019–2023)
- Jim McGovern, U.S. Representative from MA-02 (1997–present)
- Richard Neal, U.S. Representative from MA-01 (2013–present), from MA-02 (1989–2013)
- Katie Porter, U.S. Representative from CA-45 (2019–2025)
- Ayanna Pressley, U.S. Representative from MA-07 (2019–present)
- Jamie Raskin, U.S. Representative from MD-08 (2017–present)
- Jan Schakowsky, US Representative from IL-9 (1999–present)
- Lori Trahan, U.S. Representative from MA-03 (2019–present)

==== Former ====
- Berkley Bedell, former U.S. Representative from IA-06 (1975–1987) (deceased)
- David Bonior, former U.S. Representative from MI-12 (1977–1993) and from MI-10 (1993–2003); former House Democratic Chief Deputy Whip (1987–1991), former House Majority Whip (1991–1995) and former House Minority Whip (1995–2002)
- Sander Levin, former U.S. Representative from MI-09 (1983–2019); former Chair of the House Ways and Means Committee (2010–2011)
- Brad Miller, former U.S. Representative from NC-13 (2003–2013)

=== U.S. Cabinet members and Cabinet-level officials ===
==== Former ====
- Julián Castro, former U.S. Secretary of Housing and Urban Development (2014–2017); former 2020 candidate for president; former mayor of San Antonio, Texas (2009–2014)
- Robert Reich, former U.S. Secretary of Labor (1993–1997) (co-endorsement with Bernie Sanders)

=== Sub-Cabinet-level officials ===
==== Former ====
- Hady Amr, former United States Deputy Special Envoy for Israeli-Palestinian Negotiations (2014–2017); Deputy Assistant Administrator for the Middle East, USAID (2010–2013)
- Richard Cordray, former Director of the Consumer Financial Protection Bureau (CFPB) (2012–2017)
- Nicholas A. Klinefeldt, former U.S. Attorney for the Southern District of Iowa (2009–2015)
- Mike Lux, former Special Assistant to the President for Public Liaison (1993–1995)
- Joseph Y. Yun, United States Special Representative for North Korea Policy (2016–2018) U.S. Ambassador to Malaysia (2013–2016)

=== U.S. ambassadors ===
==== Former ====
- Robert Stephen Ford, former U.S. Ambassador to Syria (2011–2014), former U.S. Ambassador to Algeria (2006–2008)

== State officials ==
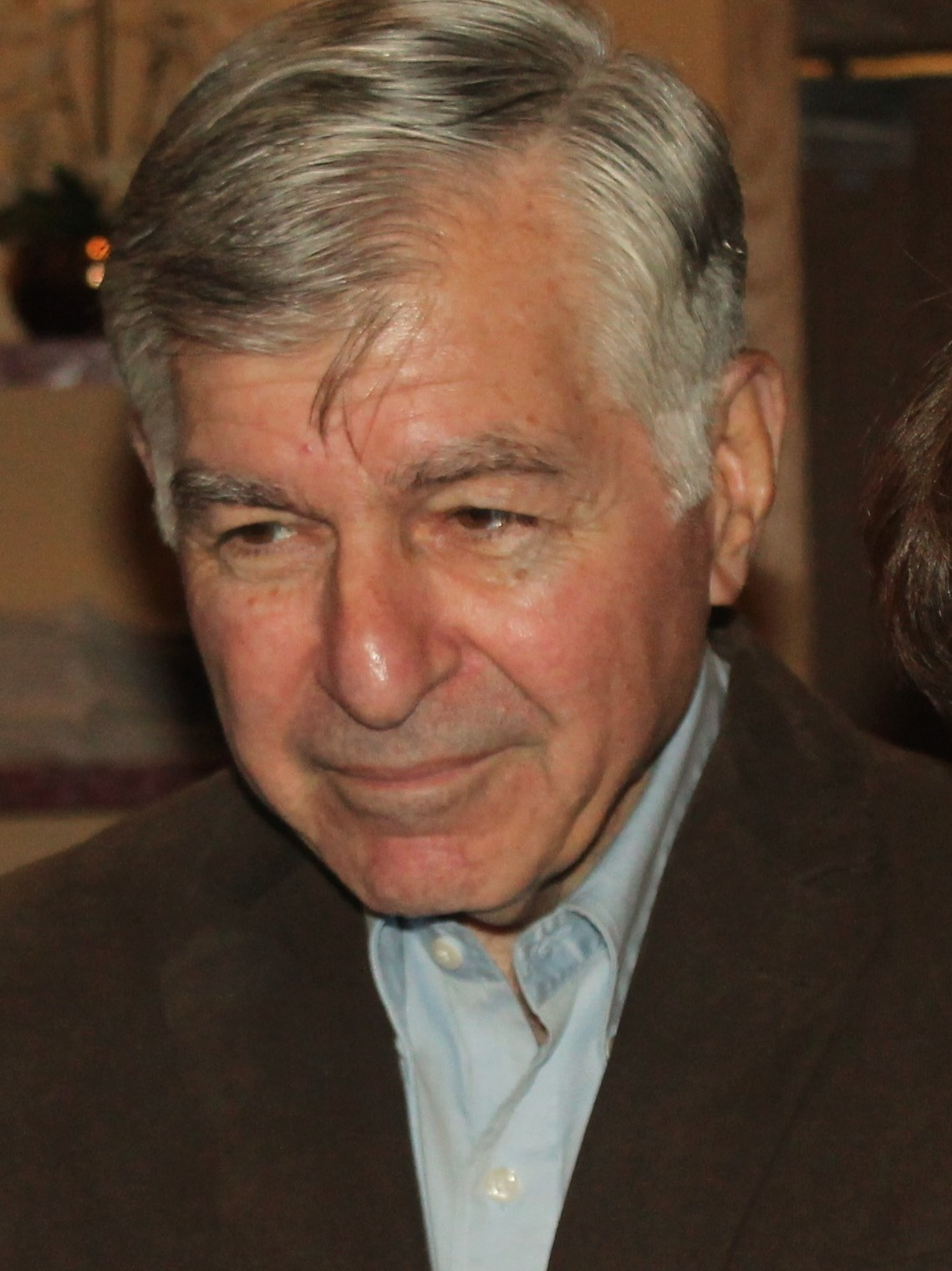
Michael Dukakis

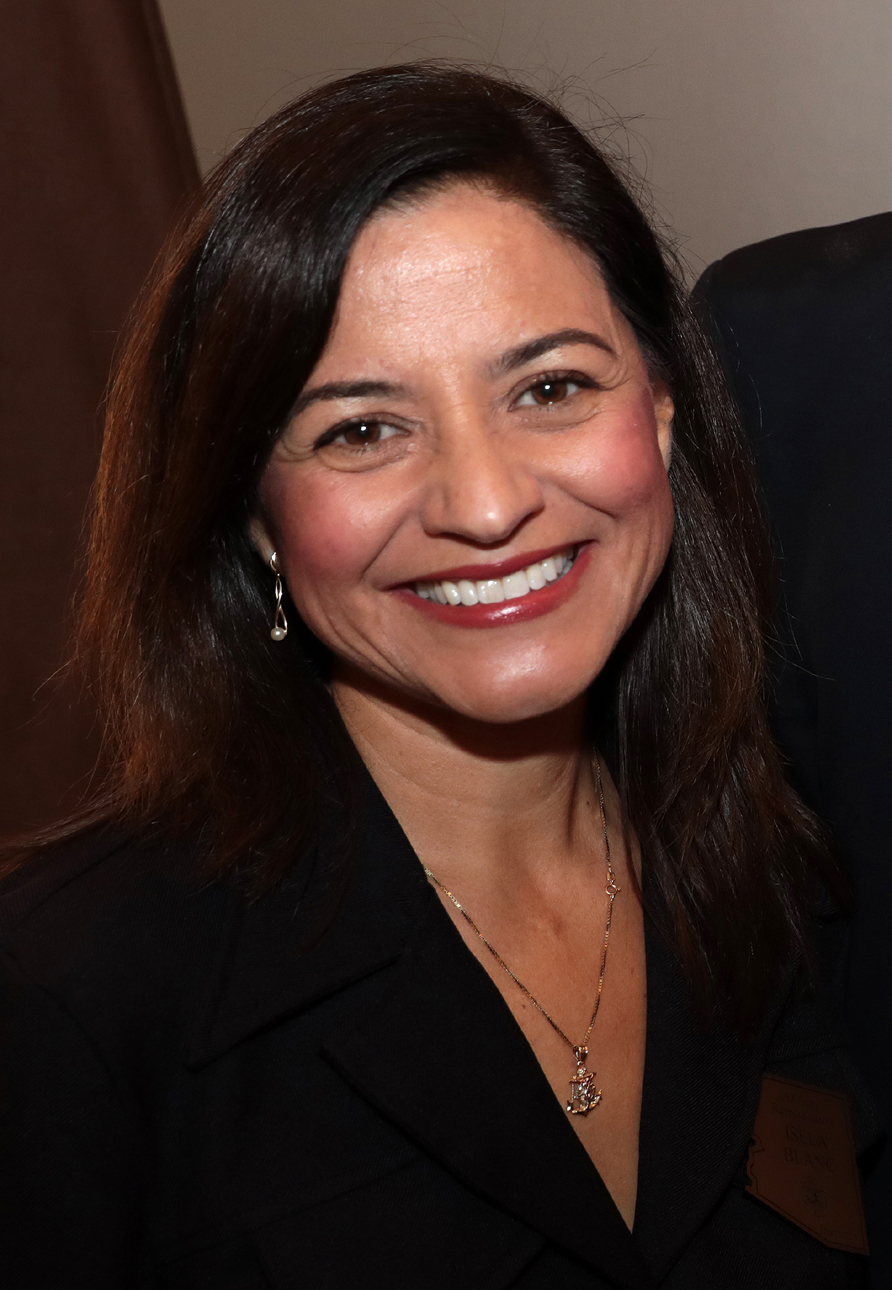
Isela Blanc

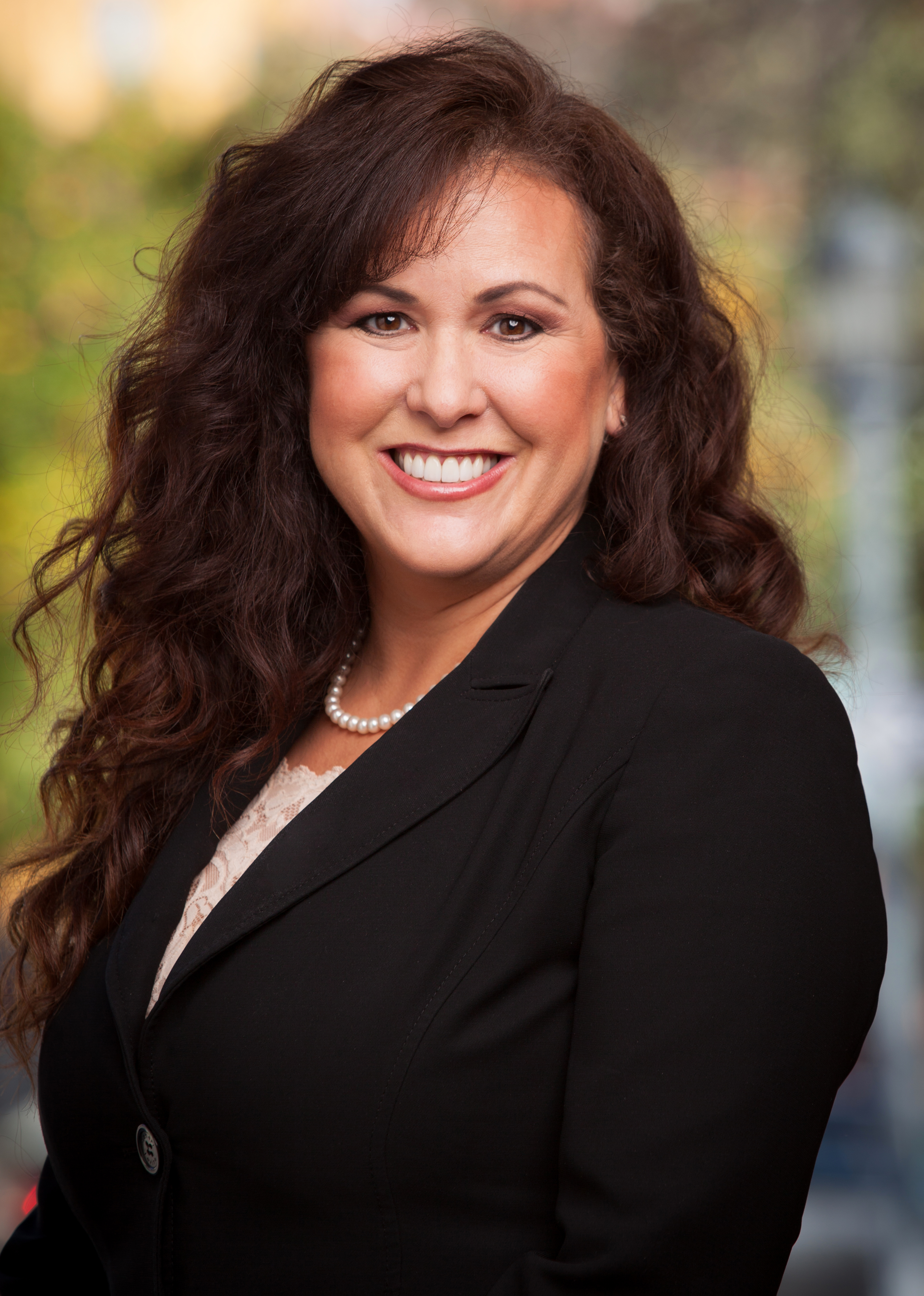
Lorena Gonzalez

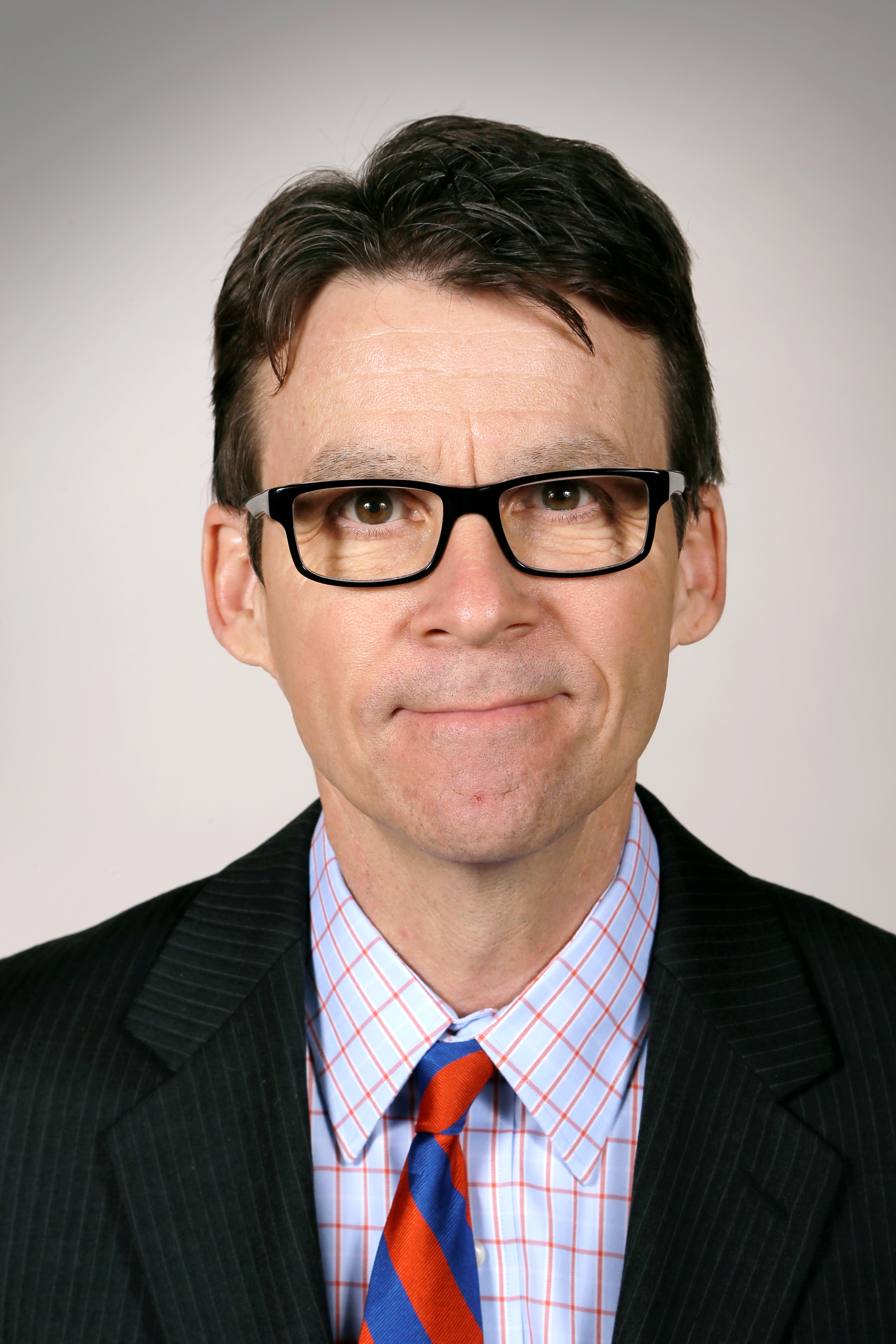
Joe Bolkcom

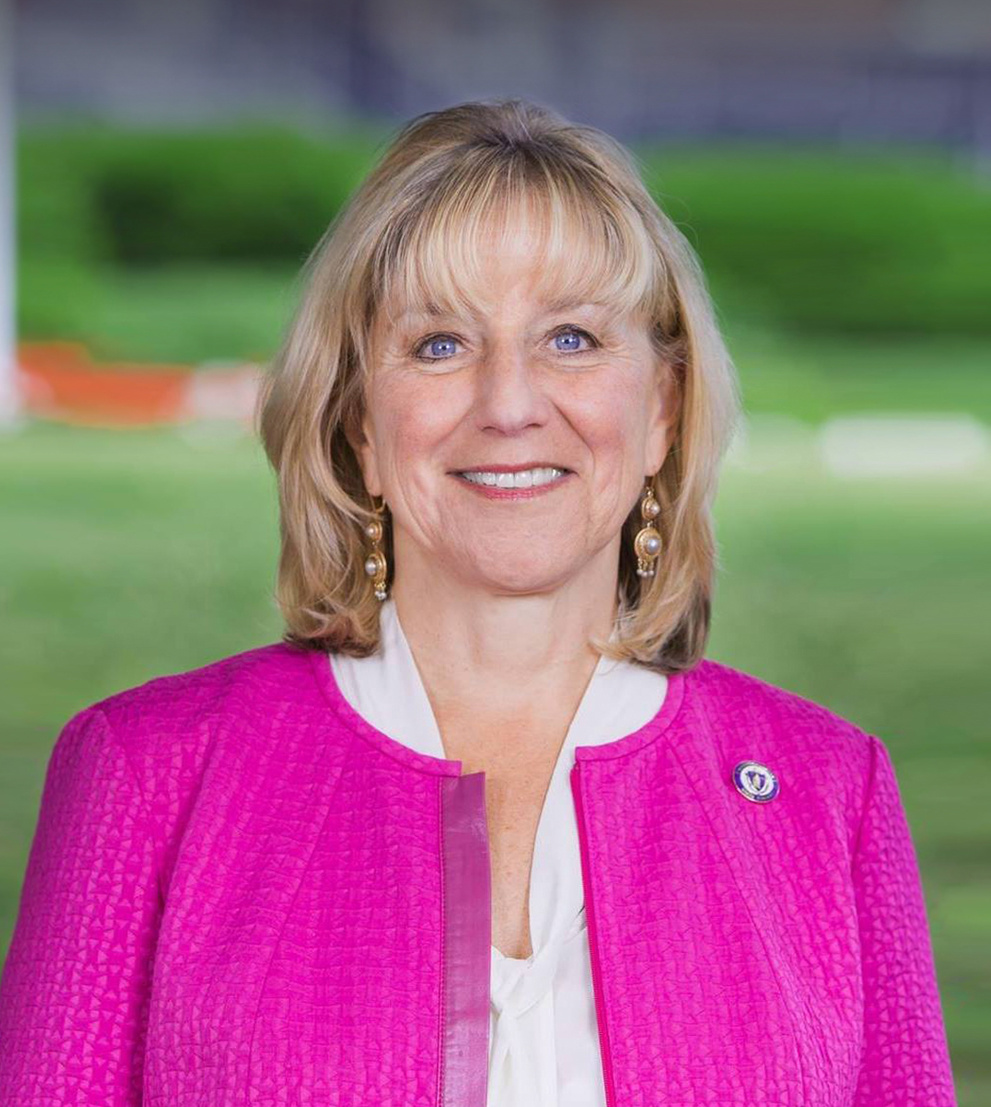
Karen Spilka

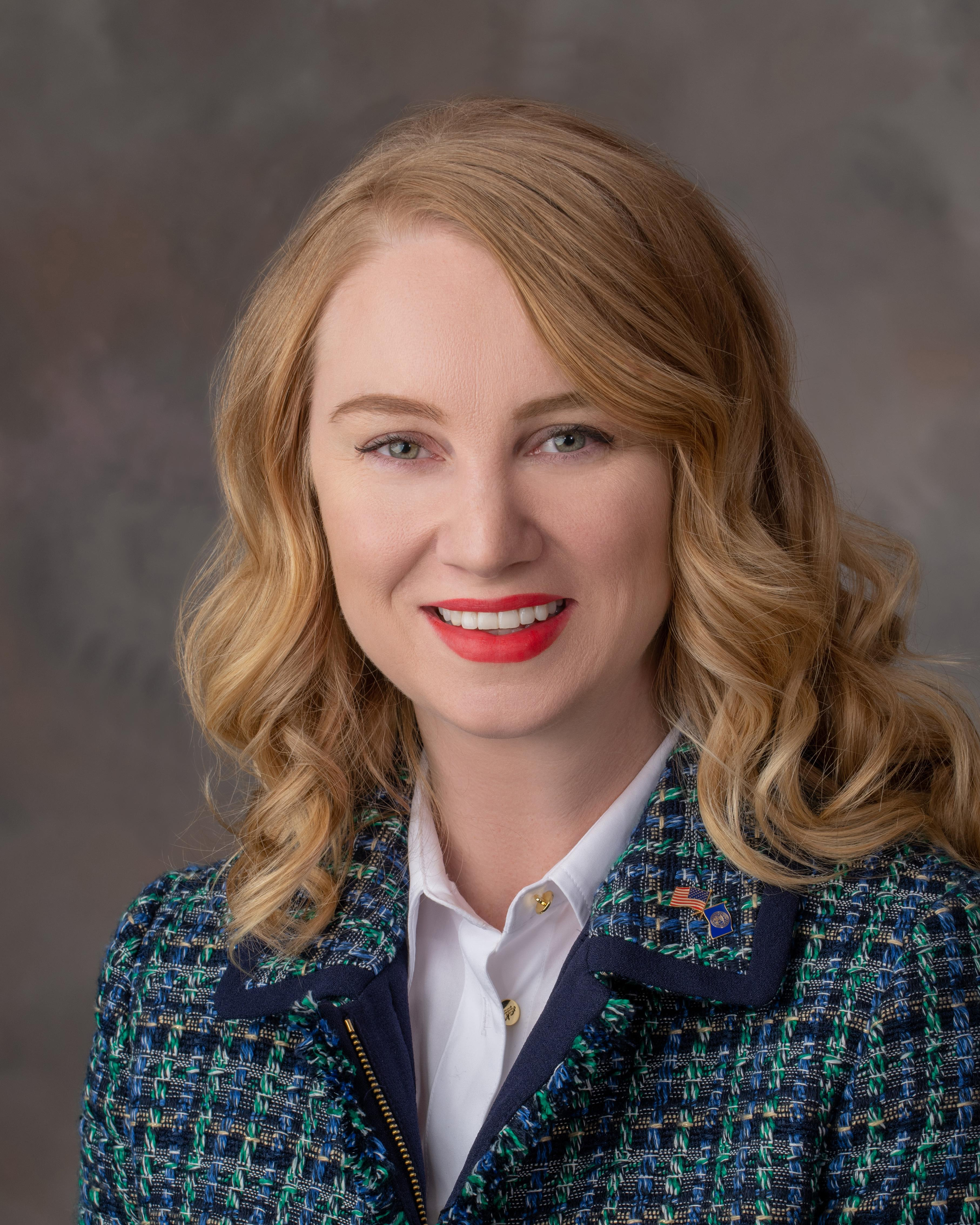
Megan Hunt

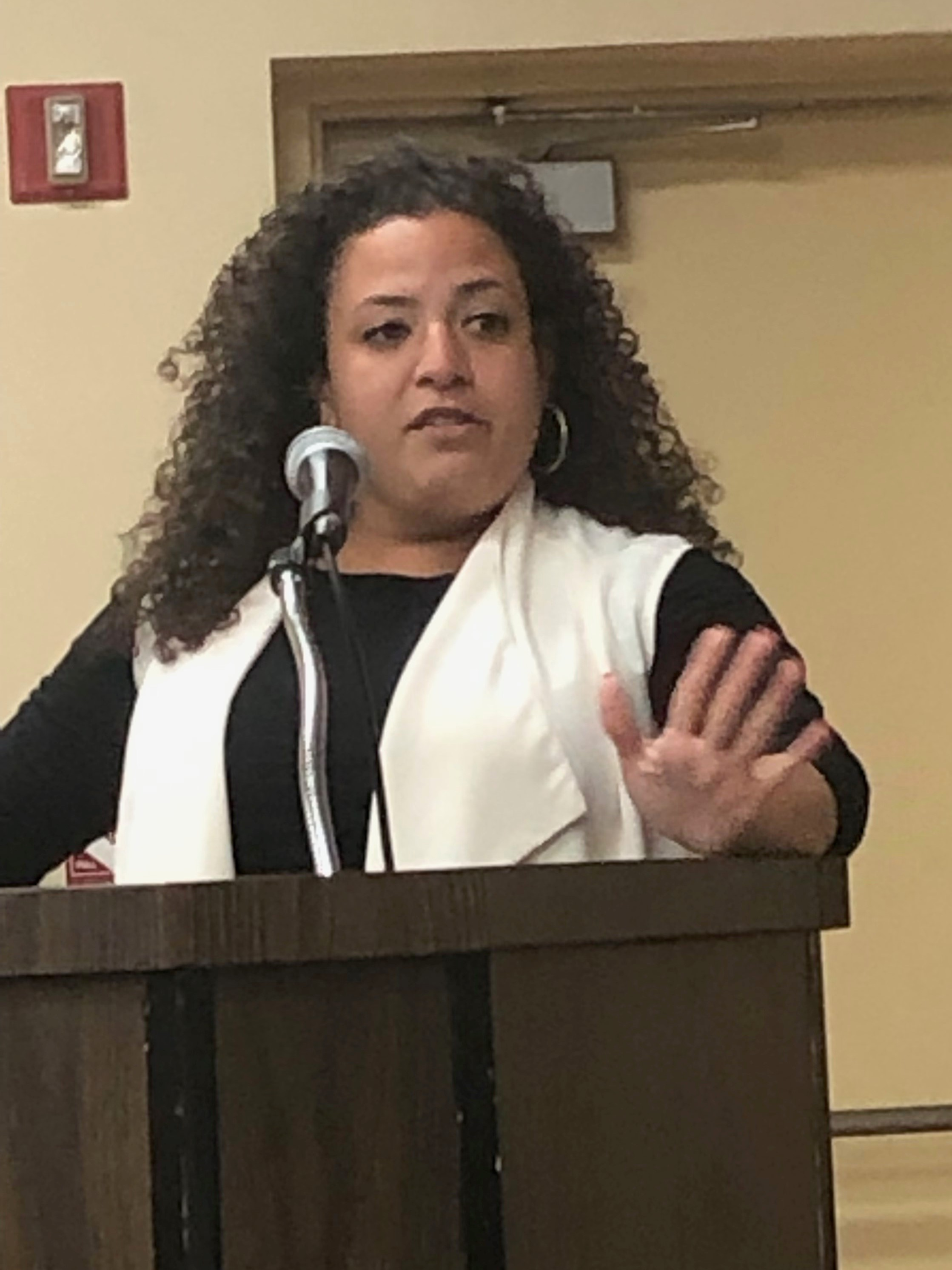
Nathalia Fernandez

=== Governors ===
==== Former ====
- Michael Dukakis, former Governor of Massachusetts (1975–1979, 1983–1991) and Democratic nominee for president in 1988

=== Statewide executive officials ===
==== Current ====
- Catherine Byrne, Nevada State Controller (2019–2023)
- Michael Fitzgerald, Iowa State Treasurer (1983–2023)
- Mike Frerichs, Treasurer of Illinois (2015–present)
- Maura Healey, Attorney General of Massachusetts (2015–2023)
- Val Hoyle, Labor Commissioner of Oregon (2019–2023), Majority Leader of the Oregon House of Representatives (2013–2015) and Oregon State Representative (2009–2017)
- Kevin Lembo, Connecticut State Comptroller (2011–2021)
- Denise Merrill, Secretary of the State of Connecticut (2011–2022)

==== Former ====
- Elaine Baxter, Secretary of State of Iowa (1987–1995)
- Sally Pederson, Lieutenant Governor of Iowa (1999–2007)

=== State legislators ===
==== Current ====
===== Alaska =====
- Zack Fields, Alaska State Representative, from the 20th district (2019–present)

===== Arizona =====
- Isela Blanc, Arizona State Representative from the 26th district (2017–2021)
- Andrés Cano, Arizona State Representative from the 3rd district (2019–2023)
- Raquel Terán, Arizona State Representative from the 30th district (2019–2021)

===== California =====
- David Chiu, California State Assemblyman from District 17 (2014–present) (previously endorsed Kamala Harris)
- Lorena Gonzalez, California State Assemblywoman from District 80 (2013–present)
- Robert Rivas, California State Assemblyman from District 30 (2018–present)
- Phil Ting, California State Assemblyman from District 19 (2012–present)
- Scott Wiener, California State Senator from District 11 (2016–present) (previously endorsed Kamala Harris)

===== Colorado =====
- Kerry Donovan, Colorado State Senator, District 5 (2015–present), Majority Whip
- Mike Foote, Colorado State Senator, from the 17th district (2019–present)
- Dominique Jackson, Colorado State Representative from the 42nd district (2017–present)
- Chris Kennedy, Colorado State Representative from the 23rd district (2017–present)
- Faith Winter, Colorado State Senator, from the 24th district (2019–present)

===== Connecticut =====
- Mary Daugherty Abrams, Connecticut State Senator from the 13th district (2019–present)
- Josh Elliott, Connecticut State Representative from the 88th district (2017–present)
- Matt Lesser, Connecticut State Senator from the 9th district (2019–present)
- Quentin Phipps, Connecticut State Representative from the 100th district (2019–present)
- Edwin Vargas, Connecticut State Representative from the 6th district (2012–present)

===== Florida =====
- Cindy Polo, Florida State Representative from the 103rd district (2018–present)

===== Illinois =====
- Omar Aquino, Illinois State Senator from the 2nd district (2016–present)
- Kelly Cassidy, Illinois State Representative from the 14th district (2011–present)
- Cristina Castro, Illinois State Senator from the 22nd district (2017–present)
- Daniel Didech, Illinois State Representative from the 59th district (2019–present)
- Will Guzzardi, Illinois State Representative from the 39th district (2015–present

===== Iowa =====
- Liz Bennett, Iowa State Representative from the 65th District (2015–present)
- Joe Bolkcom, Iowa State Senator from the 29th District (1999–2003), the 39th District (2003–2012) and the 43rd District (2012–present)
- Claire Celsi, Iowa State Senator from the 21st District (2019–present)
- Tracy Ehlert, Iowa State Representative from the 70th District (2019–present)
- Eric Giddens, Iowa State Senator from the 30th District (2019–present)
- Lindsay James, Iowa State Representative from the 99th District (2019–present)
- Jennifer Konfrst, Iowa State Representative from the 43rd District (2019–present) (previously endorsed Cory Booker)
- Mary Mascher, Iowa State Representative from the 86th District (1995–present)
- Heather Matson, Iowa State Representative from the 38th District (2019–present) (previously endorsed Cory Booker)
- Janet Petersen, Iowa State Senator from the 18th District (2013–present) and Minority Leader (Democratic) (2017–present)
- Art Staed, Iowa State Representative from the 66th District (2013–present)
- Zach Wahls, Iowa State Senator from the 37th District (2019–present)
- Beth Wessel-Kroeschell, Iowa State Representative from the 45th District (2005–present) (previously endorsed Cory Booker)
- Mary Wolfe, Iowa State Representative from the 98th District

===== Kansas =====
- Rui Xu, Kansas State Representative from District 25 (2019–present)

===== Kentucky =====
- Attica Scott, Kentucky State Representative from the 41st District (2017–present)

===== Maine =====
- Christopher Babbidge, Maine State Representative from the 8th District (2014–present; 2004–2008)
- Pinny Beebe-Center, Maine State Representative from the 93rd District (2015–present)
- Brownie Carson, Maine State Senator from the 24th District (2016–present)
- Janice Cooper, Maine State Representative from the 47th District (2014–present), Maine State Representative from the 107th District (2012–2014)
- Ryan Fecteau, Maine State Representative from the 11th District (2014–present)
- Drew Gattine, Maine State Representative from the 34th District (2012–present)
- Jim Handy, Maine State Representative from the 58th District (2016–present), Maine State Representative (1982–1992), Maine State Senator (1992–1994)
- Thomas Harnett, Maine State Representative from the 83rd District (2018–present)
- Nate Libby, Maine State Senator from the 21st district (2014–present), Majority Leader of the Maine Senate (2018–present), member of the Maine State Representative from the 60th district (2012–2014)
- Colleen Madigan, Maine State Representative from the 110th District (2016–present), Maine State Senator from the 25th District (2012—2014)
- Ann Matlack, Maine State Representative from the 92nd District (2018–present)
- Rebecca Millett, Maine State Senator from the 29th District (2012–present)
- Victoria Morales, Maine State Representative from the 33rd District (2018–present)
- Anne C. Perry, Maine State Representative from the 140th District (2002—2010; 2016–present)
- Linda Sanborn, Maine State Senator from the 30th District (2018–present), Maine State Representative from the 30th District (2008–2016)
- Charlotte Warren, Maine State Representative from the 84th District (2014–present)

===== Maryland =====
- Heather Bagnall, Maryland State Delegate from District 33 since 2019
- Alfred C. Carr Jr., Maryland State Delegate from District 18 (2007–present)
- Lorig Charkoudian, Maryland State Delegate from District 20 (2019–present)
- Arthur Ellis, Maryland State Senator from District 28 (2019–present)
- Ariana Kelly, Maryland State Delegate from District 16 (2011–present)
- Lesley Lopez, Maryland State Delegate from District 39 (2019–present)
- Stephanie M. Smith, Maryland State Delegate from District 45 since 2019
- Jen Terrasa, Maryland State Delegate from District 24 (2019–present)
- Mary L. Washington, Maryland State Senator from District 43 (2019–present)
- Jheanelle Wilkins, Maryland State Delegate from District 20 (2017–present)
- Nicole A. Williams, Maryland State Delegate from District 22 (2019–present)

===== Massachusetts =====
- Sonia Chang-Díaz, Massachusetts State Senator from the 2nd Suffolk District (2009–present))
- Jo Comerford, Massachusetts State Senator from Hampshire, Franklin and Worcester District (2019–present)
- Julian Cyr, Massachusetts State Senator from Cape Cod and Islands district (2016–present)
- Natalie Higgins, Massachusetts State Representative from the 4th Worcester district (2017–present)
- Patricia D. Jehlen, Massachusetts State Senator from the 2nd Middlesex District (2005–present)
- Eric Lesser, Massachusetts State Senator from the 1st Hampden & Hampshire District (2015–present)
- Jack Patrick Lewis, Massachusetts State Representative from the 7th Middlesex district (2017–present)
- Jon Santiago, Massachusetts State Representative from the 9th Suffolk district (2019–present)
- Karen Spilka, Massachusetts State Senator from Middlesex and Norfolk District 2 (2005–present); President of the Senate (2018–present); candidate for U.S. Representative from MA-05 in 2013
- Jose Tosado, Massachusetts State Representative from the 9th Hampden district (2015–present)
- Andy Vargas, Massachusetts State Representative from the 3rd Essex District (2017–present)

===== Michigan =====
- Rosemary Bayer, Michigan State Senator from District 12 (2019–present)
- Jim Ellison, Michigan State Representative from District 26 (2017–present)
- Mallory McMorrow, Michigan State Senator from District 13 (2019–present)
- Laurie Pohutsky, Michigan State Representative from District 19 (2019–present)
- William Sowerby, Michigan State Representative from District 31 (2017–present)

===== Nebraska =====
- Megan Hunt, Nebraska State Senator from District 8 (2019–present)

===== Nevada =====
- Heidi Swank, Nevada State Assemblywoman from District 16 since 2013
- Howard Watts, Nevada State Assemblyman from District 15 (2018–present)
- Joyce Woodhouse, Nevada State Senator for Clark County 5 (Dual-member District) District 5 (2006–2010) and District 5 since 2010 (previously endorsed Kamala Harris)

===== New Hampshire =====
- Richard Abel, New Hampshire State Representative from Coos District 13 (2014–present)
- Debra Altschiller, New Hampshire State Representative from Rockingham District 19 (2016–present)
- Lisa Bunker, New Hampshire State Representative from Rockingham District 18 (2018–present)
- Edward Butler, New Hampshire State Representative from Carroll District 7 (2006–2010, 2012–present)
- Kevin Cavanaugh, New Hampshire State Senator from District 16 (2017–present)
- Wendy Chase, New Hampshire State Representative from Strafford District 18 since 2018
- Jacqueline Chretien, New Hampshire State Representative from Hillsborough District 42 (2018–present)
- Casey Conley, New Hampshire State Representative from Strafford District 13
- Francesca Diggs, New Hampshire State Representative from Grafton District 16 (2018–present)
- David Doherty, New Hampshire State Representative from Merrimack District 20 since 2014
- Susan M. Ford, New Hampshire State Representative from Grafton District 3 (2008–2010, 2012–2016, 2018–present) (previously endorsed Kirsten Gillibrand)
- Samantha Fox, New Hampshire State Representative from Merrimack District 23 (2018–present)
- Elaine French, New Hampshire State Representative from Grafton District 14 (2018–present)
- Julie Gilman, New Hampshire State Representative from Rockingham District 18 (2012–present)
- Chuck Grassie, New Hampshire State Representative from Strafford District 11 (2016–present)
- Gaby Grossman, New Hampshire State Representative from Rockingham District 18 (2018–present)
- Christopher Herbert, New Hampshire State Representative from Hillsborough District 42 (2014–present)
- Peg Higgins, New Hampshire State Representative from Strafford District 22 (2018–present)
- Timothy Josephson, New Hampshire State Representative from Grafton District 11 (2016–present)
- Nicole Klein-Knight, New Hampshire State Representative from Hillsborough District 11 (2018–present)
- Jerry Knirk, New Hampshire State Representative from the Carroll District 3 (2016–present)
- Larry Laflamme, New Hampshire State Representative from Coos District 3 (2016–present)
- Connie Lane, New Hampshire State Representative from Merrimack District 12 (2018–present)
- Tamara Le, New Hampshire State Representative from Rockingham District 31 (2016–present)
- Patrick Long, New Hampshire State Representative from Hillsborough District 10 (2006–present)
- Rebecca McBeath, New Hampshire State Representative from Rockingham District 26 (2014–present)
- Liz McConnell, New Hampshire State Representative from Rockingham District 11 (2018–present)
- Kat McGhee, New Hampshire State Representative from Merrimack District 40 (2018–present)
- Rebecca McWilliams, New Hampshire State Representative from Merrimack District 27 (2018–present)
- David Meuse, New Hampshire State Representative from Rockingham District 29 (2018–present)
- Mary Jane Mulligan, New Hampshire State Representative from Grafton District 12 (2016–present)
- Sharon Nordgren, New Hampshire State Representative from Grafton District 9 (1988–present)
- Lee Walker Oxenham, New Hampshire State Representative from the Sullivan District 1 (2014–present) (previously endorsed Cory Booker)
- ~~Michael Pedersen, New Hampshire State Representative from the Hillsborough District 32 (2018–present)~~ (switched endorsement to Amy Klobuchar)
- Jeffrey Salloway, New Hampshire State Representative from Strafford District 5 (2016–present) (previously endorsed Cory Booker)
- Kris Schultz, New Hampshire State Representative from Merrimack District 18
- Suzanne Smith, New Hampshire State Representative from Grafton District 8 (2008–present)
- Peter Somssich, New Hampshire State Representative from Rockingham District 27 (2016–present)
- Kathryn Stack, New Hampshire State Representative from Hillsborough District 21 (2018–present)
- Laurel Stavis, New Hampshire State Representative from Grafton District 13 (2018–present)
- Deb Stevens, New Hampshire State Representative from Hillsborough District 34 (2018–present)
- Brian Sullivan, New Hampshire State Representative from Sullivan District 1
- Sandy Swinburne, New Hampshire State Representative from Cheshire District 10 (2018–present)
- George Sykes, New Hampshire State Representative from Grafton District 13 (2012–present)
- Wendy Thomas, New Hampshire State Representative from Hillsborough District 21 (2018–present)
- Yvonne Thomas, New Hampshire State Representative from Coos District 3 (2006–present)
- Craig Thompson, New Hampshire State Representative from Cheshire District 14 (2018–present)
- Matthew Towne, New Hampshire State Representative from Strafford District 4 (2018–present)
- Edith Tucker, New Hampshire State Representative from Coos District 5 (2016–present)
- Suzanne Vail, New Hampshire State Representative from Hillsborough District 30 (2018–present)
- Connie Van Houten, New Hampshire State Representative from Hillsborough District 45 (2016–present)
- Mary Jane Wallner, New Hampshire State Representative from the Merrimack District 10 (1980–present), Majority Leader of the New Hampshire House of Representatives (2007–2010, 2019–present)
- Safiya Wazir, New Hampshire State Representative from Merrimack District 17 (2018–present)
- Joyce Weston, New Hampshire State Representative from Grafton District 8 (2014–present)

===== New Mexico =====
- Javier Martinez, New Mexico State Representative from the 11th district (2015–present)

===== New York =====
- Alessandra Biaggi, New York State Senator from the 34th District (2019–present)
- Patrick B. Burke, New York State Assemblymember from the 142nd District (2013–present)
- Catalina Cruz, New York State Assemblymember from the 39th district (2019–present)
- Carmen De La Rosa, New York State Assemblymember from the 72nd district (2017–present)
- Harvey Epstein, New York State Assemblymember from the 74th district (2018–present)
- Nathalia Fernandez, New York State Assemblymember from the 80th district (2018–present)
- Rachel May, New York State Senator from the 53rd District (2019–present)
- Yuh-Line Niou, New York State Assemblymember from the 65th district (2017–present)
- Gustavo Rivera, New York State Senator from the 33rd District (2011–present)
- Linda Rosenthal, New York State Assemblymember from the 67th district (2006–present)
- Jo Anne Simon, New York State Assemblymember from the 52nd district (2015–present)

===== North Carolina =====
- Deb Butler, North Carolina State Representative from the 18th District (2017–present)
- Susan C. Fisher, North Carolina State Representative from the 114th District (2004–present)

===== Oregon =====
- Michael Dembrow, Oregon State Senator from the 23rd District (2013–present)
- Shemia Fagan, Oregon State Senator from the 24th District (2019–present)
- Julie Fahey, Oregon State Representative from the 14th District (2017–present)
- Sara Gelser, Oregon State Senator from the 8th District (2015–present)
- Jeff Golden, Oregon State Senator from the 3rd District (2019–present)
- Diego Hernandez, Oregon State Representative from the 47th District since 2017
- Alissa Keny-Guyer, Oregon State Representative from the 46th District since 2011
- Tina Kotek, Oregon State Representative from the 44th District (2007–present) and Speaker of the Oregon House of Representatives (2013–present)
- Carla Piluso, Oregon State Representative from the 50th District since 2015
- Karin Power, Oregon State Representative from the 41st District (2017–present)
- Andrea Salinas, Oregon State Representative from the 38th District (2017–present)
- Barbara Smith Warner, Oregon State Representative from the 45th District (2014–present)

===== Pennsylvania =====
- Leanne Krueger, Pennsylvania State Representative from the 161st district (2015–present)
- Katie Muth, Pennsylvania State Senator from the 44th district (2019–present)
- Danielle Friel Otten, Pennsylvania State Representative from the 155th district (2019–present)
- Brian Sims, Pennsylvania State Representative from the 182nd district (2012–present)

===== Rhode Island =====
- Edith Ajello, Rhode Island State Senator from the 1st district (2013–present)
- Liana Cassar, Rhode Island State Senator from the 66th district (2019–present)
- Gayle Goldin, Rhode Island State Senator from the 3rd district (2013–present)
- Rebecca Kislak, Rhode Island State Representative from the 4th district (2018–present)
- Teresa Tanzi, Rhode Island State Senator from the 34th district (2011–present)
- Bridget Valverde, Rhode Island State Senator from the 35th district (2019–present)
- Moira Walsh, Rhode Island State Senator from the 3rd district (2017–present)

===== South Carolina =====
- Kambrell Garvin, South Carolina State Representative from District 77 since 2018

===== Tennessee =====
- Gloria Johnson, Tennessee State Representative from the 13th district (2019–present)

===== Texas =====
- Sheryl Cole, Texas State Representative from the 46th district (2019–present)
- Art Fierro, Texas State Representative from the 79th district (2019–present) (previously endorsed Julian Castro)
- Mary González, Texas State Representative from the 75th district (2013–present) (previously endorsed Julian Castro)
- Joe Moody, Texas State Representative from the 78th district (2009–2011, 2013–present) and Speaker Pro Tempore (2019–present) (previously endorsed Julian Castro)
- José R. Rodríguez, Texas State Senator from the 29th district (2011–present) (previously endorsed Julian Castro)
- Shawn Thierry, Texas State Representative from the 146th district (2017–present)
- Erin Zwiener, Texas State Representative from the 45th district (2019–present)

===== Virginia =====
- Jimmy P. Anderson, Wisconsin Assemblymember from the 47th district (2017–present)
- Jonathan Brostoff, Wisconsin Assemblymember from the 19th district (2015–present)
- Luz Escamilla, member of the Utah State Senate from the 1st district (2009–present)
- Ghazala Hashmi, Virginia State Senator from the 10th district (2020–present)
- Brian King, member of the Utah House of Representatives from the 28th District (2009–present), Minority Leader of the Utah House of Representatives since (2015–present)
- Karen Kwan, member of the Utah House of Representatives from the 34th district (2017–present)
- Chris Larson, Wisconsin State Senator from the 7th district (2011–present)
- Greta Neubauer, Wisconsin Assemblymember from the 62nd district (2018–present)
- Sam Rasoul, Virginia State Delegate from the 11th district (2014–present)

==== Former ====
- Daniel Biss, former Illinois State Senator from the 9th district (2013–2019)
- Wendy Brawley, former South Carolina State Representative from District 70 (2017-2022)
- Charles Bruner, former Iowa State Senator from District 37 (1983–1990) and former Iowa State Representative from District 41 (1979–1982)
- Robert Dvorsky, former Iowa State Senator for District 37 (2003–2019) and from District 25 (1995–2003); former Iowa State Representative from District 49 (1993–1995) and for District 54 (1987–1993)(previously endorsed Kamala Harris)
- Beth Edmonds, Maine State Senator from the 10th District (2001–2009)
- Lucy Flores, Nevada State Assemblywoman from District 28 (2011–2015)
- Chris Giunchigliani, former Nevada State Assemblyman from District 9 (1991–2006)
- Tishaura Jones, former Missouri State Representative for District 63 (2009–2013) and Treasurer of St. Louis (2013–present)
- Mark Kuhn, former Iowa State Senator from District 29(1999–2003) and the 14th District (2003–2011)
- Sheila Leslie, former Nevada State Senator from Washoe County District 1 (later District 13) (2010–2012), former Nevada State Assemblywoman from District 27 (1998–2010)
- Phil P. Leventis, former South Carolina Senator from Lexington County District 35 (1980–2012)
- Maricé Morales, Maryland State Delegate from District 19 (2015–2019)
- Joe Neal, former Nevada State Senator from Clark County District 4 (1972–2004)
- Terie Norelli, former New Hampshire State Representative from Rockingham 16 (1996–2014) and former Speaker of the New Hampshire House of Representatives (2012–2014)
- Dave Osterberg, former Iowa State Senator from District 43 (1983–1992) and District 50 (1993–1994)
- Victor R. Ramirez, former Maryland State Senator for District 47 (2011–2019); former Maryland State Delegate for District 47 (2003–2011)
- James R. Riordan, former Iowa State Senator from District 45 (1986–1992) and the 39th District (1993–1994)
- Steve Sovern, former Iowa State Senator from District 15 (1975–1976)
- Kurt Swaim, former Iowa State Representative from District 94 (2003–2013)

== Local and municipal officials ==
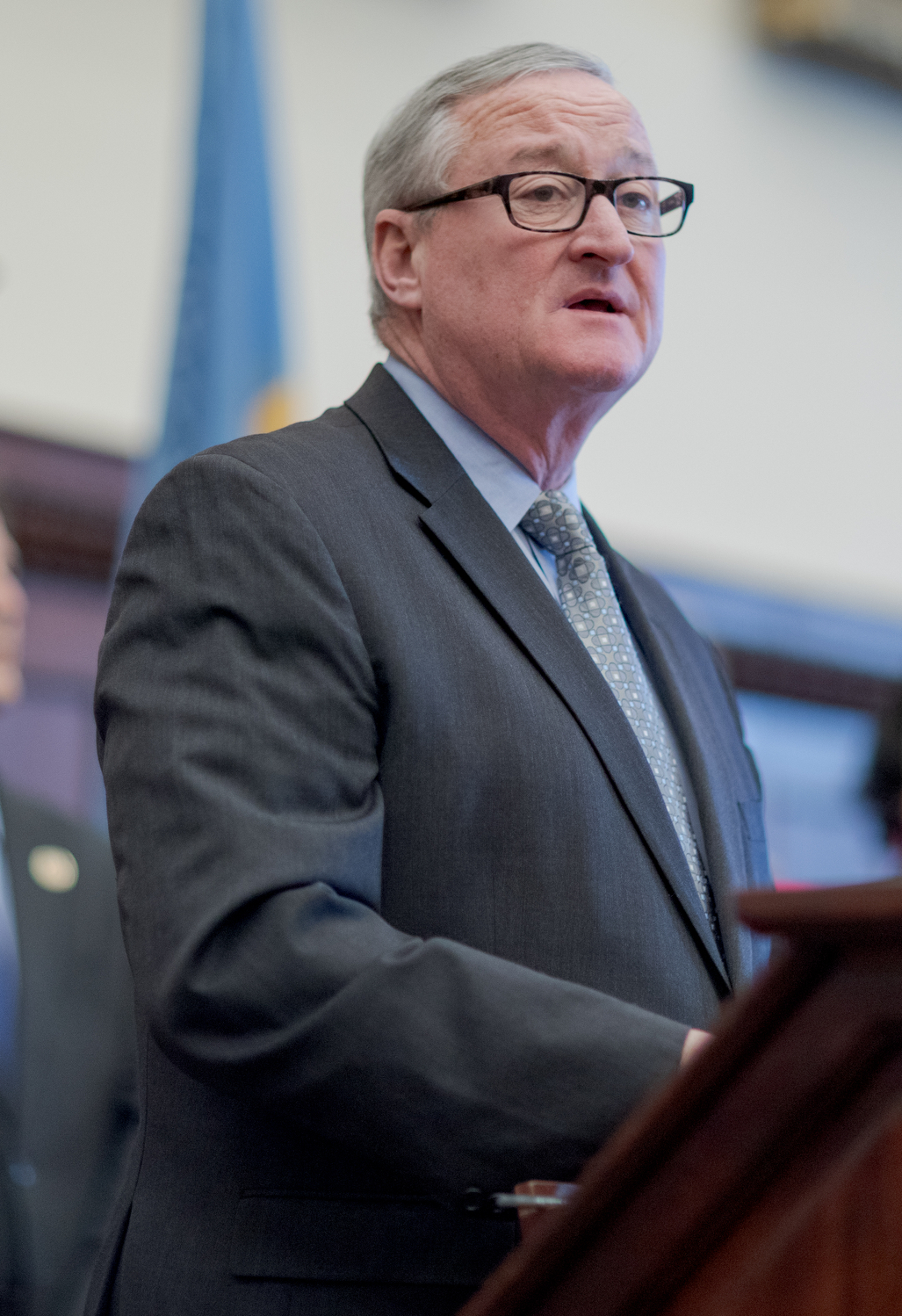
Jim Kenney

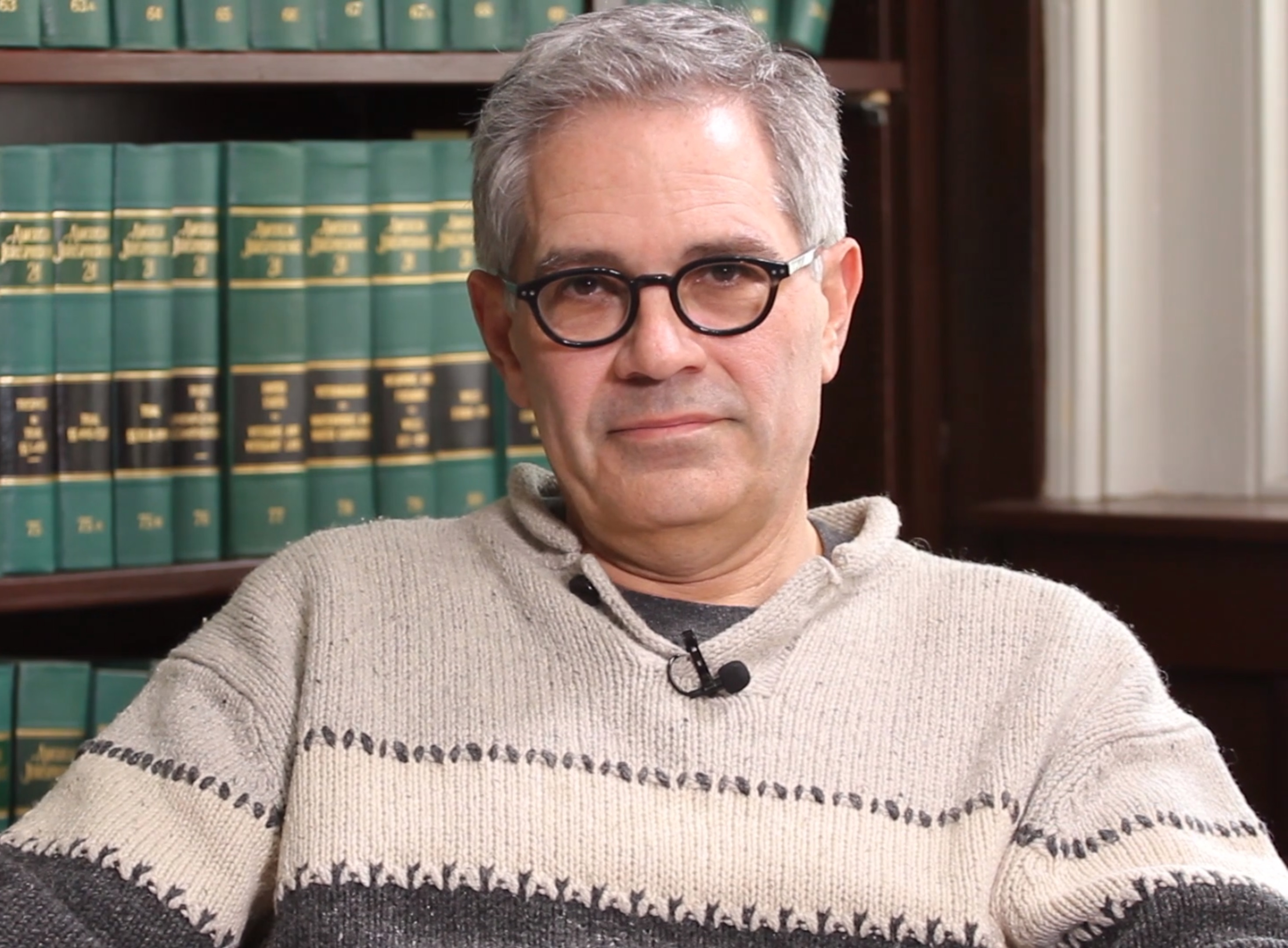
Larry Krasner

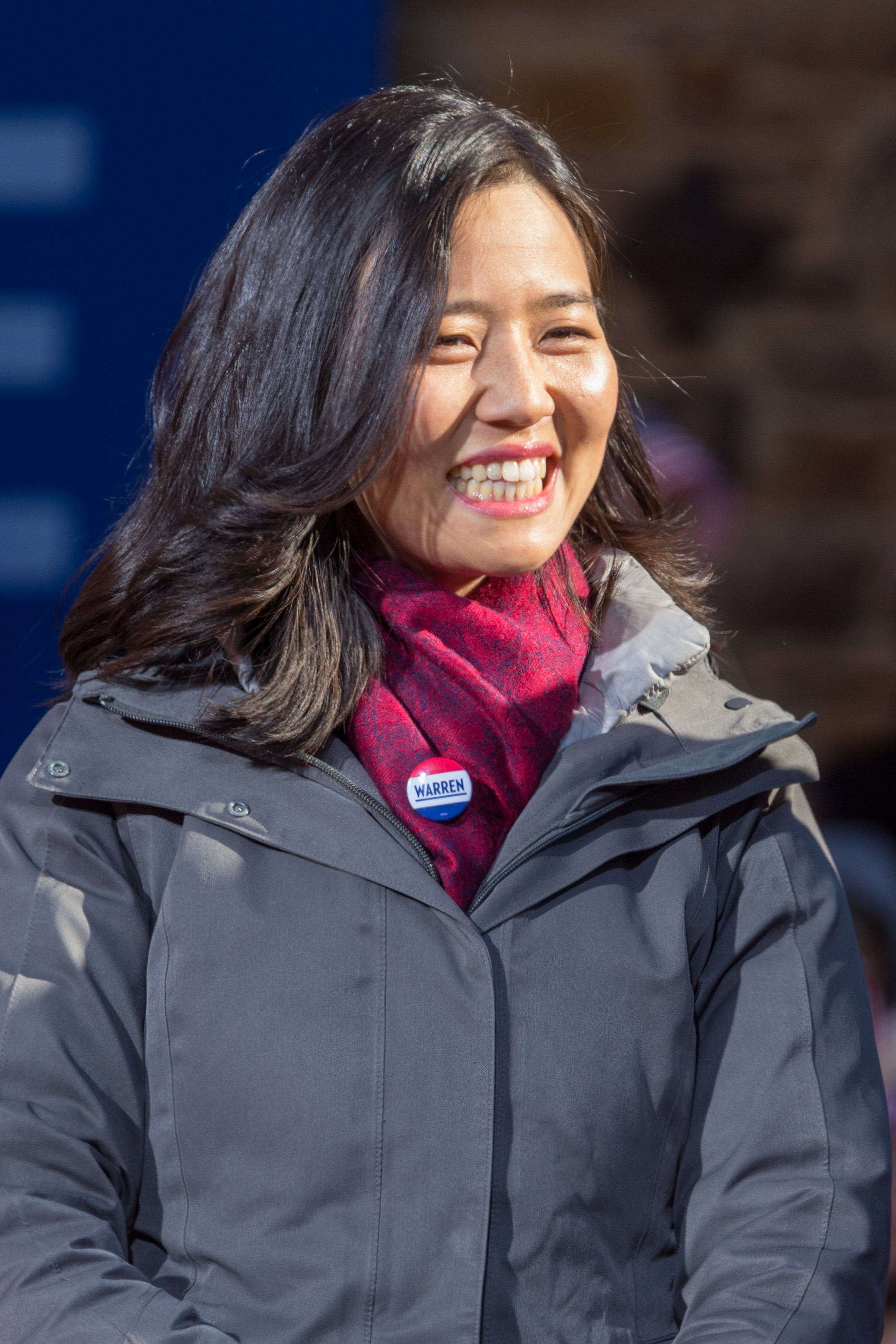
Michelle Wu

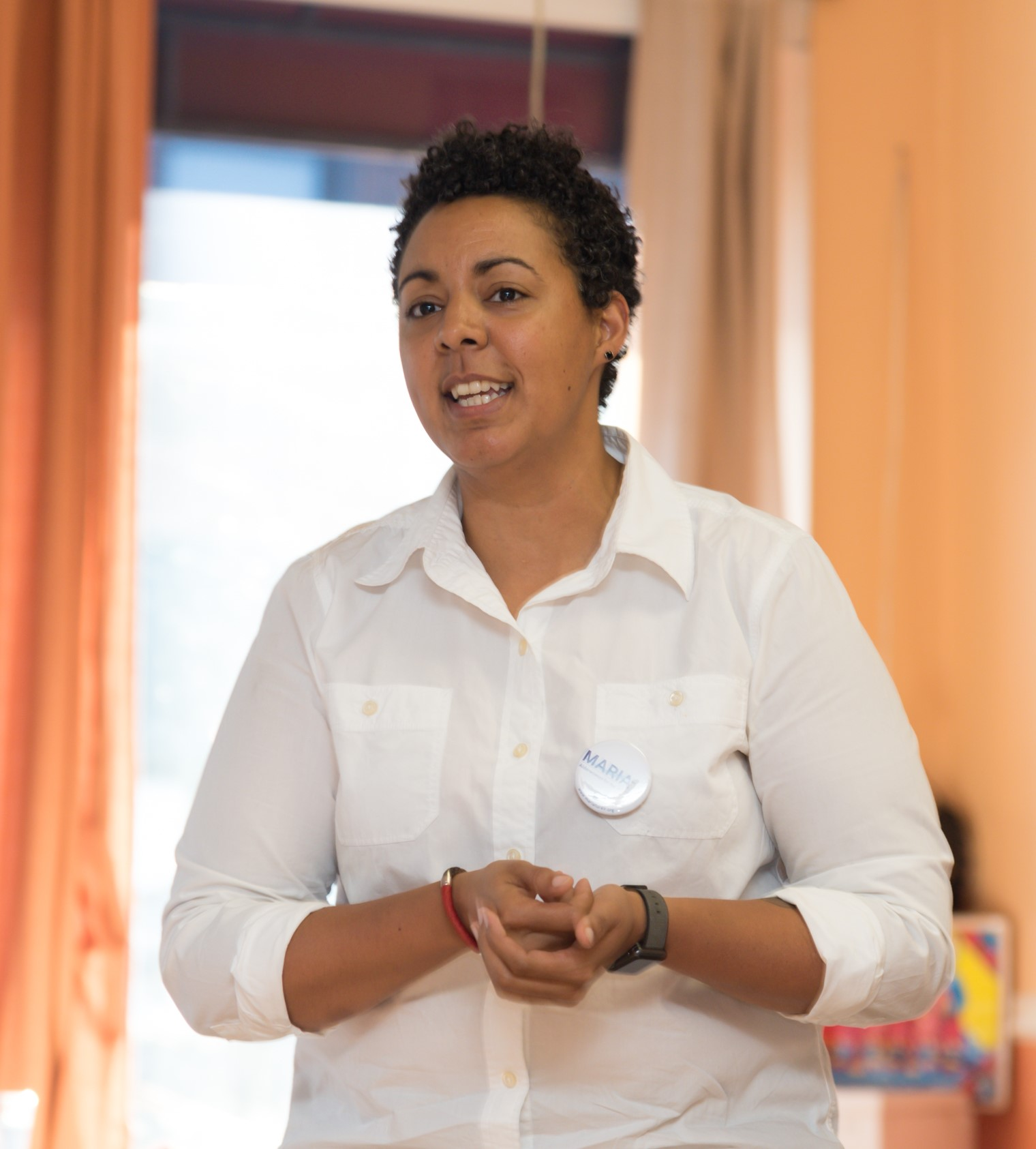
Maria Hadden

=== Mayors ===
==== Current ====
- Jim Kenney, Mayor of Philadelphia, Pennsylvania (2016–2024)
- Alex Morse, Mayor of Holyoke, Massachusetts (2012–2021)
- Regina Romero, Mayor of Tucson, Arizona (2019–present)
- Christopher Taylor, Mayor of Ann Arbor, Michigan (2014–present)

==== Former ====
- Jackie Biskupski, Mayor of Salt Lake City (2016–2020)

=== Municipal executive officials ===
==== Current ====
- Lina Hidalgo, Harris County, Texas judge (2019–Present)
- Larry Krasner, District Attorney of Philadelphia (2018–present)
- Rachael Rollins, District Attorney of Suffolk County (2019–present)
- Scott Stringer, New York City Comptroller (2014–present)

==== Former ====
- Mark Green, former New York City Public Advocate (1994–2001)

=== Municipal legislators ===
==== Current ====
- Sheena Barnes, Toledo Public Schools School Board representative-at-large (2020–present)
- Michaela Burriss, Upper Arlington, Ohio City Councilwoman (2020–present)
- Costa Constantinides, New York City Councilman from District 22 (2014–present)
- Lydia Edwards, Boston, MA City Councilor, District 1 (2017–Present)
- Paige Ellis, Austin City Council Member, District 8 (2019–present)
- Chloe Eudaly, Portland, Oregon City Councilmember (2016–present)
- Jamie Gauthier, Philadelphia City Councilmember from the 3rd District (2020–present)
- Maria Hadden, Chicago City Council Alderman from the 49th ward (2019–present)
- Natasha Harper-Madison, Austin City Council Member, District 1 (2019–present)
- Ben Kallos, New York City Councilman from District 5 (2014–present)
- Ann Kitchen, Austin City Council Member, District 5 (2015–present)
- Kelly Kosek, Strongsville, Ohio Councilwoman from the 3rd ward (2018–present)
- Brad Lander, New York City Councilman from District 39 (2010–present)
- Shammas Malik, Akron, Ohio City Councilman from the 8th ward (2020–present)
- Matt Martin, Chicago City Council Alderman from the 47th ward (2019–present)
- Dale Miller, Cuyahoga County, Ohio Councilman from the 2nd District (2011–present)
- Leslie Pool, Austin City Council Member, District 7 (2015–present)
- Antonio Reynoso, New York City Councilman from District 34 (2014–present)
- Jocelyn Rhynard, Dayton Public Schools School Board representative-at-large (2018–present)
- Kathie Tovo, Austin City Council Member, District 9 (2015–present)
- Jimmy Van Bramer, New York City Councilman from the 26th District since 2010
- Michelle Wu, Boston, Massachusetts City Councilor, at-large (2014–present)

==== Former ====
- Tameika Isaac Devine, Columbia, South Carolina City Council Member At-Large (2002–2022)
- Marty Gelfand, former South Euclid, Ohio City Councilman-at-large (2012–2020)

=== County officials ===
==== Current ====
- Brandon Johnson, Cook County commissioner from the 1st district since 2018

== Party officials ==
=== DNC members ===
- Mark Brewer, former Chair of the Michigan Democratic Party (1995–2013)
- Kate Donaghue, DNC member from Massachusetts
- Alex Goff, DNC member from Nevada
- Allison Stephens, DNC member from Nevada
- Kathleen Sullivan, DNC member from New Hampshire; former New Hampshire Democratic Party Chair (1997–2007)
- Celina Vasquez, DNC member from Texas

== Notable individuals ==
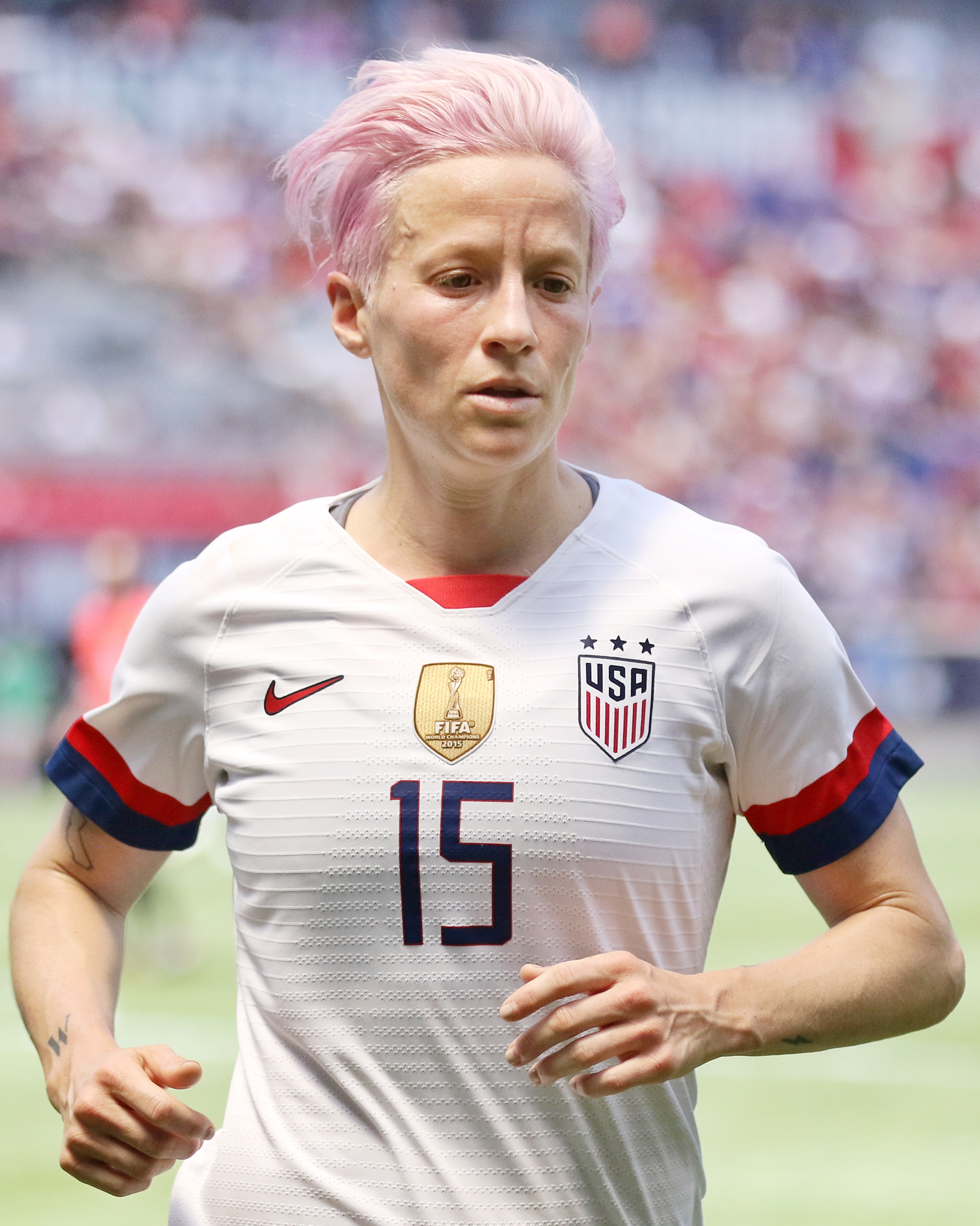
Megan Rapinoe

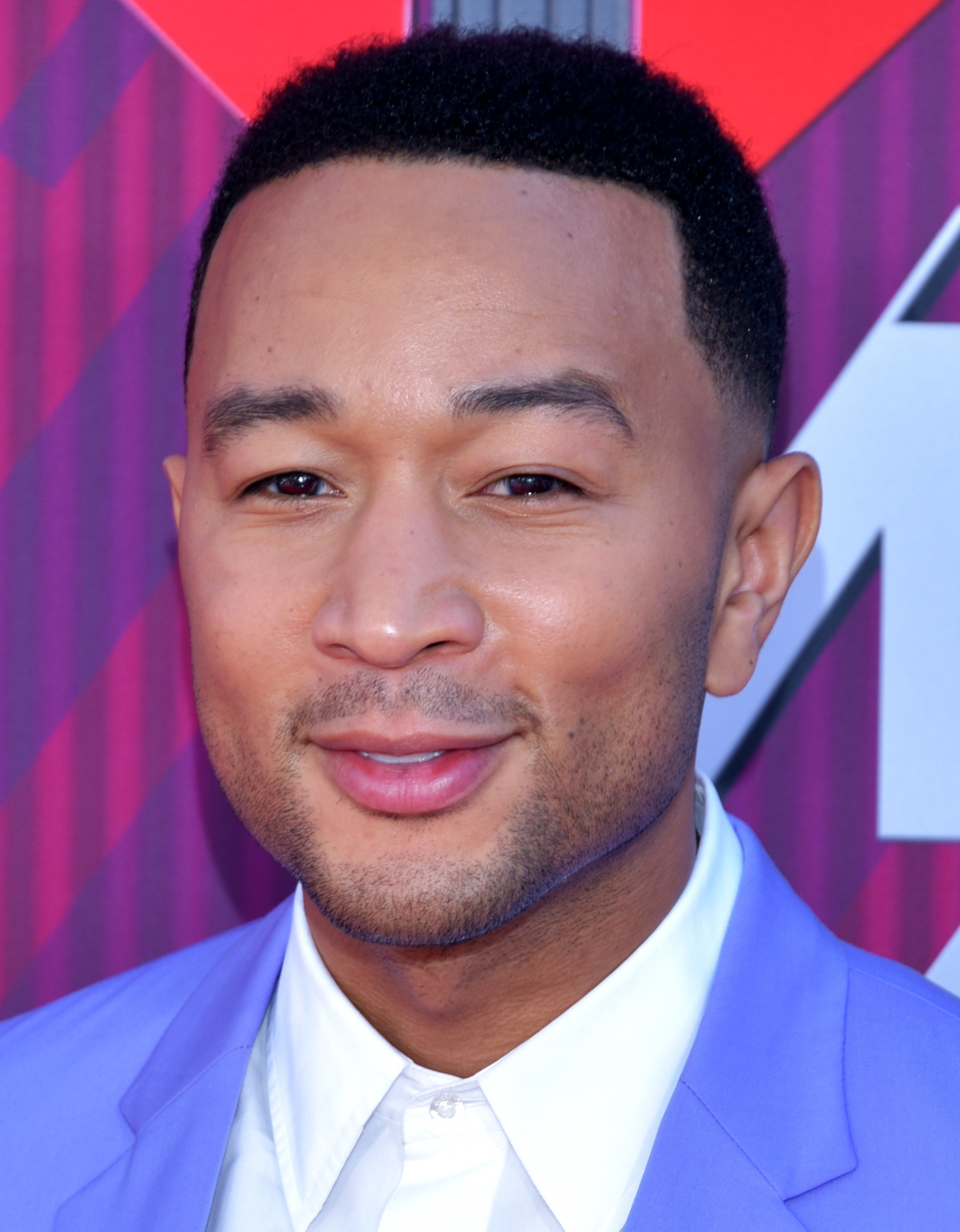
John Legend

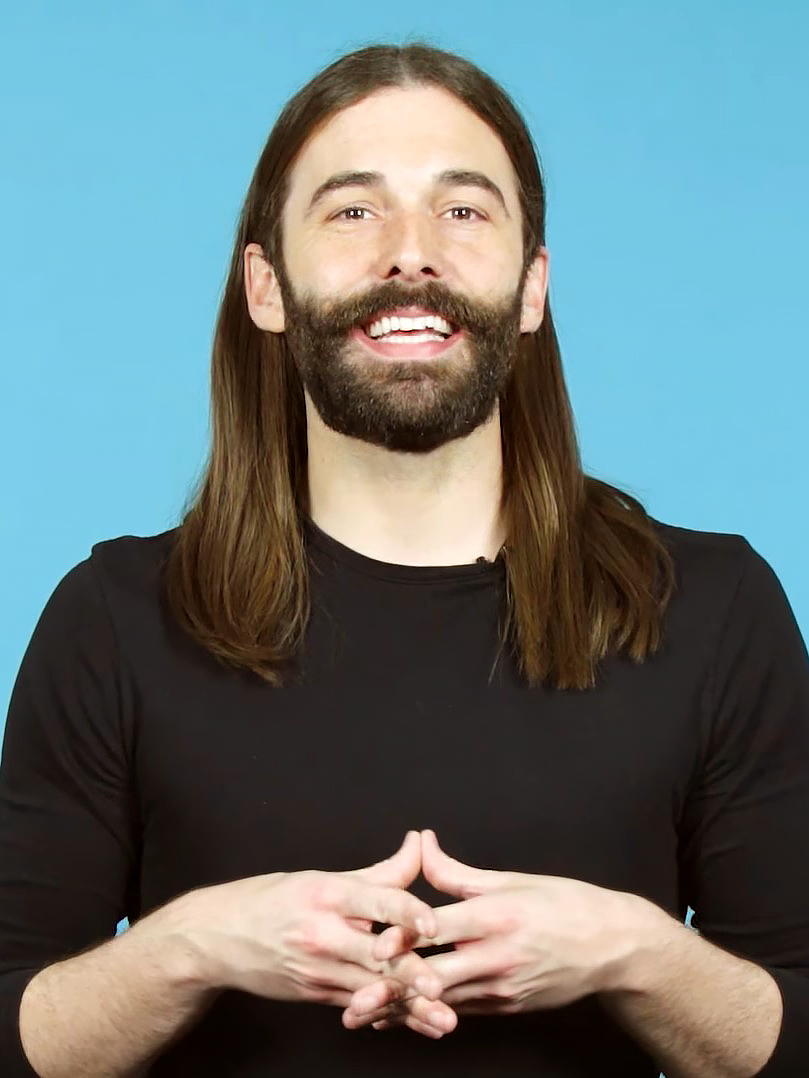
Jonathan Van Ness

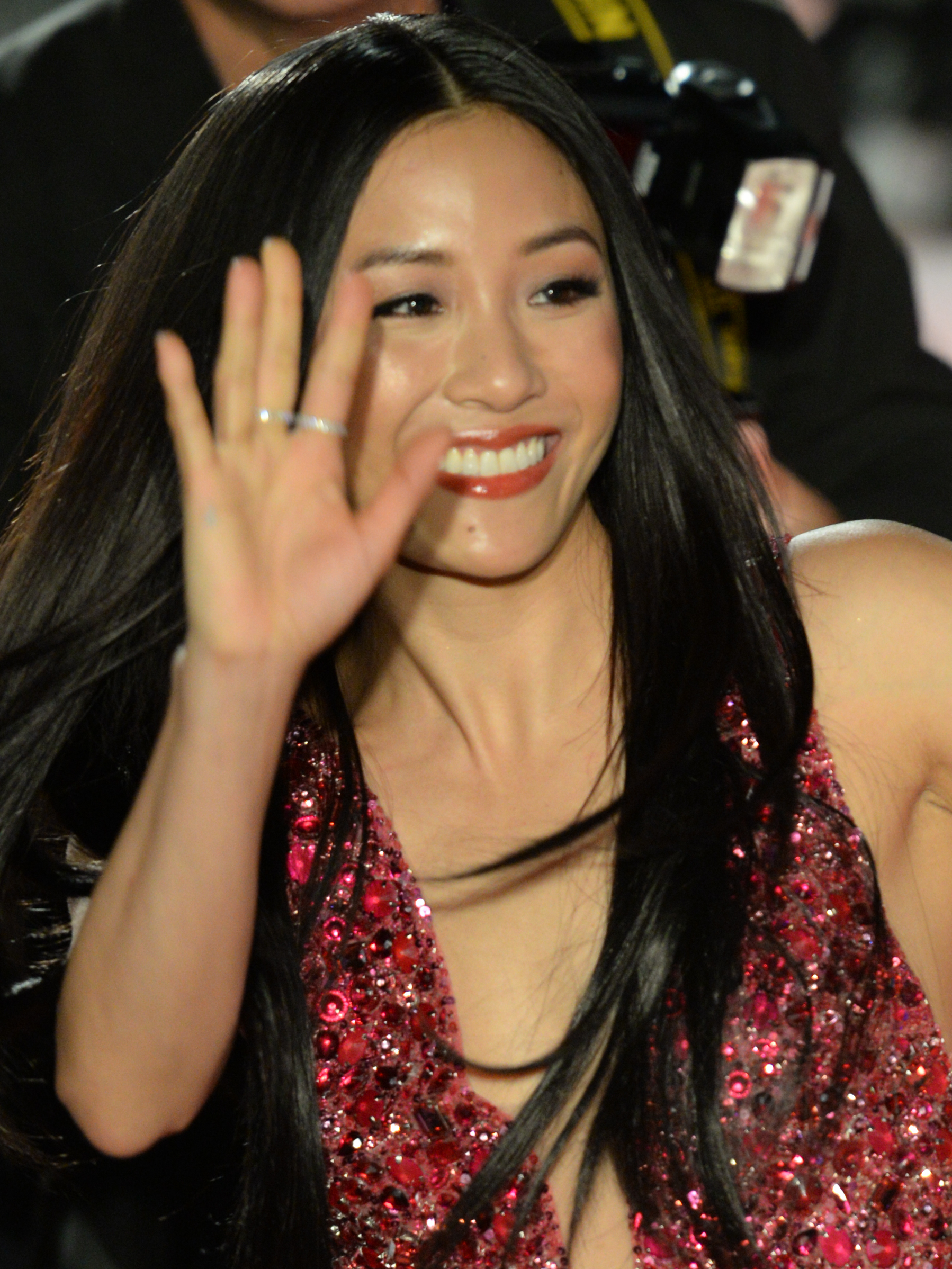
Constance Wu

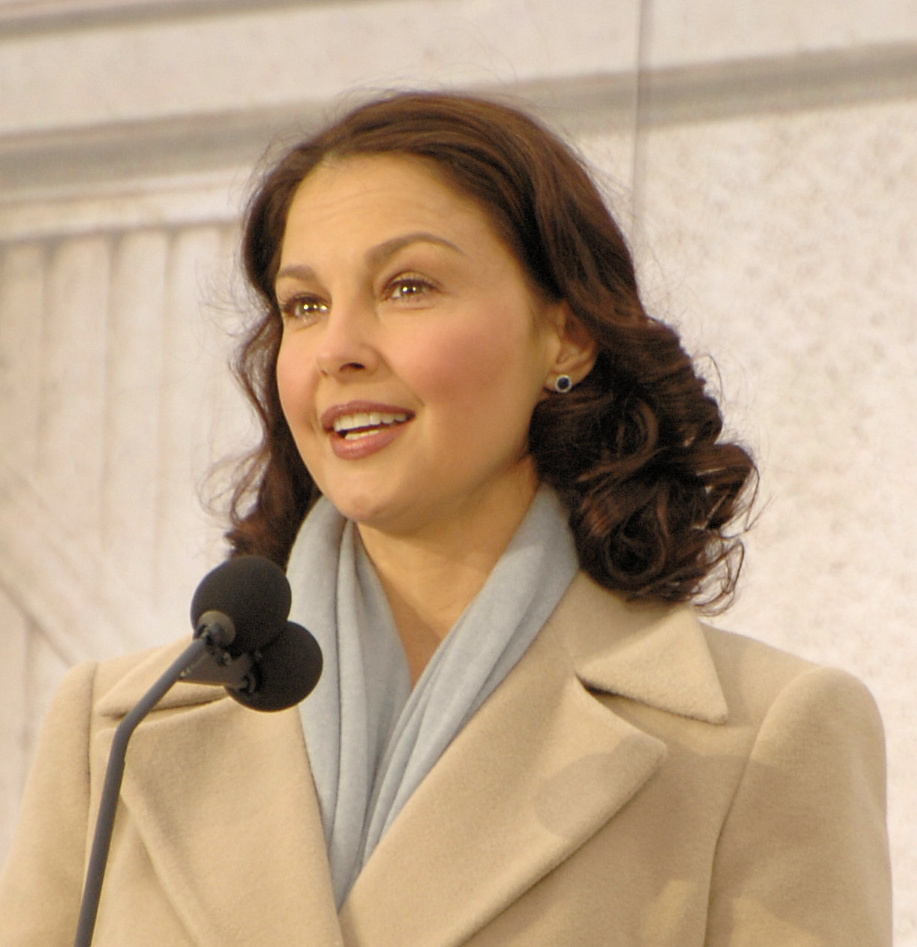
Ashley Judd

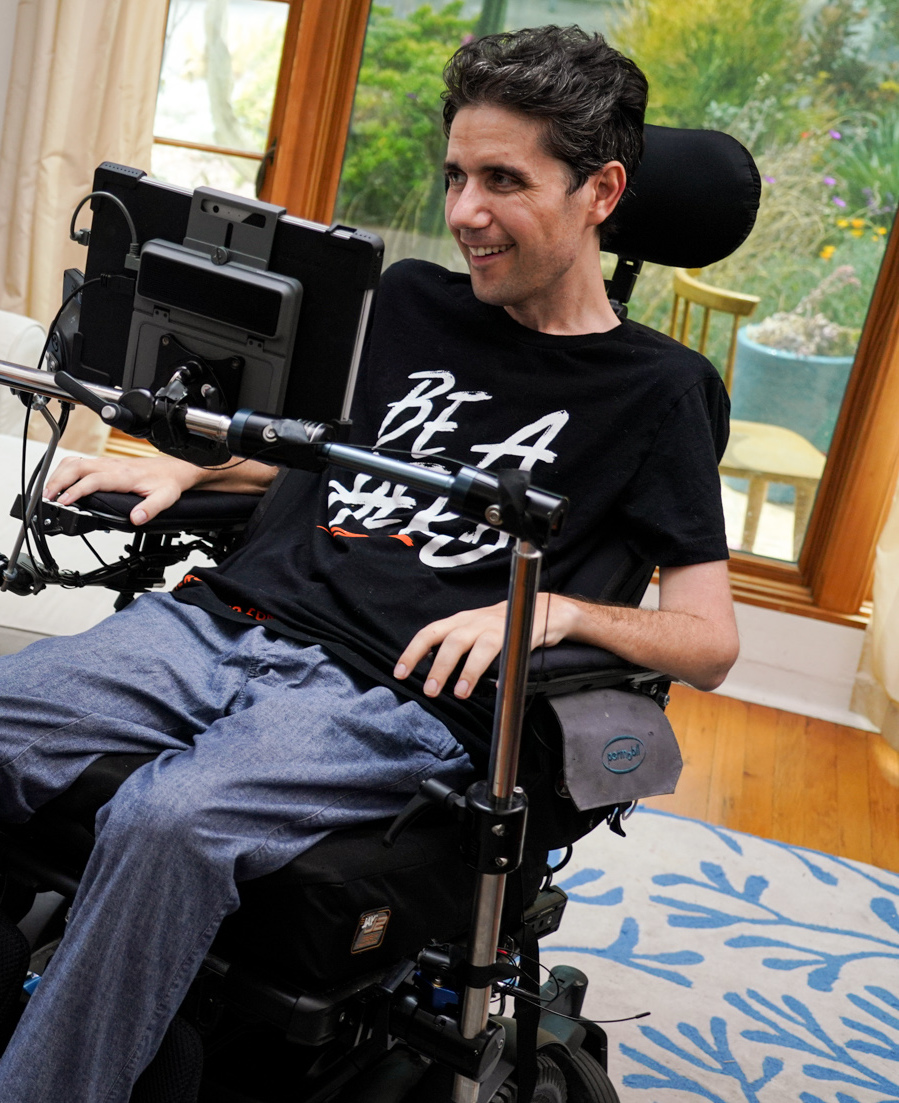
Ady Barkan

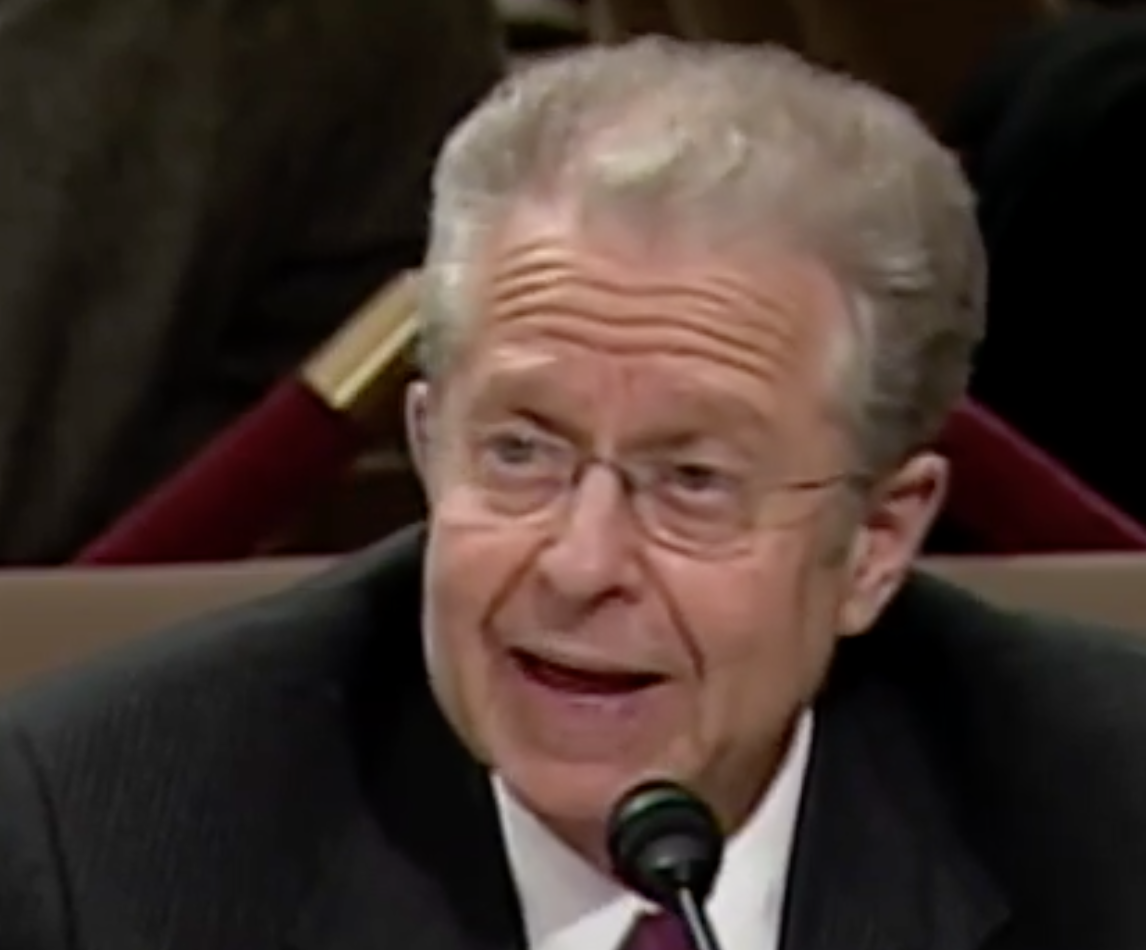
Larry Tribe

=== Athletes and sports figures ===
- Layshia Clarendon, basketball player for the Connecticut Sun and activist
- Chris Mosier, triathlete and activist
- Megan Rapinoe, professional soccer player
- Adam Rippon, Olympic figure skater

=== Businesspeople ===
- Franklin Leonard, film executive
- Ellen Pao, investor and activist

=== Entertainers and artists ===
- Charlie Adler, voice actor, director and activist
- Cristela Alonzo, comedian, actress, writer and producer
- Elizabeth Banks, actress, director, writer, and producer
- Ike Barinholtz, comedian, actor, writer, director, producer and screenwriter
- Lance Bass, singer, dancer, actor, film and television producer, and author
- Bobby Berk, interior designer and television personality
- Jello Biafra, punk rock singer of the Dead Kennedys, Green Party candidate in the 2000 United States presidential election, 1979 candidate for mayor of San Francisco, CA (co-endorsement with Bernie Sanders)
- Iram Parveen Bilal, filmmaker and entrepreneur
- Ashley Nicole Black, actress and writer
- Steve Blum, voice actor
- Lilan Bowden, actress
- Yvette Nicole Brown, actress
- Karen Chee, comedian, essayist, comedy writer
- Shea Couleé, drag queen and reality TV personality
- Grey DeLisle, voice actress
- Ramona Diaz, filmmaker
- Melissa Etheridge, singer-songwriter, guitarist, and activist
- Ben Feldman, actor
- Sally Field, actress and author
- Jane Fonda, actress and activist
- Travon Free, comedian, actor, and writer
- Kathy Griffin, comedian
- Jennifer Hale, voice actress
- Barry Jenkins, filmmaker
- Scarlett Johansson, actress, singer and producer
- Jon St. John, voice actor
- Ashley Judd, actress and activist
- Michael Kang, film director
- Amanda Winn Lee, voice actress
- John Legend, singer
- Jonathan Meiburg, writer, musician, and Shearwater bandleader
- Jennifer Siebel Newsom, filmmaker and First Partner of California (independent)
- Liam O'Brien, voice actor, writer and director
- Rosie O'Donnell, comedian and television personality
- Annabel Park, filmmaker
- Piper Perabo, actress
- Busy Philipps, actress and writer
- PJ Raval, cinematographer and filmmaker
- Tasha Reign, pornographic actress
- Eden Riegel, voice actress
- Angela Robinson, actress and singer
- Adam Savage, former host of MythBusters and special effects designer
- Amy Schumer, actress and activist
- Adam Scott, actor, comedian, producer, and podcaster
- Martin Sheen, actor
- Alex Skolnick, guitarist for Testament
- Joey Soloway, television creator, showrunner, director and writer
- Renee Tajima-Peña, filmmaker
- Amber Tamblyn, actress, writer and director
- Courtenay Taylor, voice actress
- Chrissy Teigen, model, television personality, and author
- Jonathan Van Ness, hairdresser, podcaster, and television personality
- Constance Wu, actress
- Jenny Yang, comedian and writer
- Danny Zuker, television writer and producer

=== Political activists ===
- Ady Barkan, healthcare activist and attorney
- Xiye Bastida, Otomi climate activist and organizer of Fridays for Future New York City
- Tracy Chou, activist and software engineer
- Charlotte Clymer, LGBT+ activist and writer
- Patrisse Cullors, co-founder of Black Lives Matter (co-endorsement with Bernie Sanders)
- Gisele Barreto Fetterman, activist and Second Lady of Pennsylvania
- Gavin Grimm, anti-bathroom bill activist
- Rhiana Gunn-Wright, one of the key policy architects of the Green New Deal
- Lori Kido Lopez, media activist and Professor of Media and Cultural Studies at the University of Wisconsin-Madison
- Ashlee Marie Preston, transgender rights activist, journalist, former California State Assembly candidate.
- Urvashi Vaid, author, attorney, and LGBTQ rights activist

=== Religious leaders ===
- Bruce Reyes-Chow, American Teaching Elder (minister) of the Presbyterian Church

=== Writers, experts, and commentators ===
- Gina Apostol, writer
- Dean Baker, macroeconomist and co-founder of the Center for Economic and Policy Research
- Loryn Brantz, author, illustrator and activist
- Rabia Chaudry, writer, attorney, podcast host
- Esther Choo, emergency physician and associate professor at the Oregon Health & Science University
- Arthur Chu, columnist, Jeopardy! champion
- Nicole Chung, writer and editor
- Gerry Conway, comic book writer
- Robert Creamer, political consultant, community organizer, and author
- Art Cullen, editor of the Storm Lake Times
- Anil Dash, blogger and entrepreneur
- Steven DeKnight, screenwriter, producer, director, creator of Spartacus
- Gabe Dunn, writer, actress, journalist, comedian, LGBTQ activist, and podcaster
- Jeff Faux, founder of the Economic Policy Institute
- Annie Fox, writer
- Marshall Ganz, professor of community organizing and grassroots organizing at the Harvard Kennedy School at Harvard University
- Roxane Gay, writer, professor, editor, and commentator
- Gayatri Gopinath, associate professor of Social and Cultural Analysis and director of the Center for the Study of Gender and Sexuality at New York University
- Rhiana Gunn-Wright, social and environmental policy expert and one of the architects of the Green New Deal
- Jenny Han, writer
- Gish Jen, writer
- Sarah Kendzior, journalist and author
- Stephen King, writer
- Sally Kohn, journalist, political commentator, CEO of Movement Vision Lab
- R. O. Kwon, writer
- Thanhha Lai, writer
- Jay Lender, animator and writer
- Damon Lindelof, writer and producer
- R. Zamora Linmark, writer
- J. Kenji López-Alt, writer
- Sam Maggs, writer
- Jeffrey Marsh, writer, actor, artist, non-binary rights activist
- Heather McGhee, political commentator and former president of Demos
- Courtney Milan, writer
- Lawrence Mishel, distinguished fellow at the Economic Policy Institute
- Kevin Nadal, author, activist, comedian, and professor of psychology at John Jay College of Criminal Justice and The Graduate Center of the City University of New York
- Celeste Ng, writer
- Christopher Noxon, writer and journalist
- Marti Noxon, writer, director, and producer
- Robyn Ochs, activist and editor of Bi Women Quarterly
- Dan Santat, writer and illustrator
- Rebecca Solnit, writer
- Cheryl Strayed, writer
- Laurence Tribe, Carl M. Loeb University Professor at Harvard Law School
- Monique Truong, writer
- Esmé Weijun Wang, writer
- Chuck Wendig, author, comic book writer, screenwriter, and blogger
- Raquel Willis, writer, executive editor of Out, and transgender rights activist
- Bill Wolkoff, writer and director
- Jeff Yang, writer and journalist

== Organizations ==
Working Families Party

=== Labor unions ===
- AFT - American Federation of Teachers (Massachusetts), representing 23,000 (co-endorsement with Bernie Sanders and Joe Biden)
- National Union of Healthcare Workers, representing 15,000 (co-endorsement with Bernie Sanders)

=== Newspapers ===
- The Austin Chronicle
- The Boston Globe
- The Des Moines Register
- The New York Times (co-endorsement with Amy Klobuchar)
- The Storm Lake Times

=== Political organizations ===
- EMILY's List
- Lambda Independent Democrats of Brooklyn
- Lesbian and Gay Democratic Club of Queens
- National Organization for Women (NOW) PAC
- Progressive Change Campaign Committee
- Stonewall Democratic Club of New York
- Working Families Party
