= Malcolm Taylor =

Malcolm Taylor may refer to:

- Malcolm Taylor (American football) (born 1960), American football player
- Malcolm Taylor (South Carolina politician)
- Malcolm Taylor (cricketer) (1904–1978), English cricketer
- Malcolm Campbell Taylor (1832–1922), Scottish minister and professor
- Malcolm Tink Taylor, American politician
- Malcolm McDowell (born Malcolm Taylor; 1943), British actor, producer, and television presenter

== See also ==
- Malcolm Cartwright-Taylor (1911–1969), British Royal Marines officer
