= Jermaine Johnson =

Jermaine Johnson may refer to:

- Jermaine Johnson II (born 1999), American football player
- Jermaine Johnson (politician) (born 1985), American politician, political advisor and basketball player
- Jermaine Johnson (footballer) (born 1980), Jamaican footballer
