= James Faber =

Mayor, Town of Eastover

Member of the South Carolina House of Representatives from the 70th district
- In office 1985–1990
- Preceded by: Julius Murray
- Succeeded by: Levola S. Taylor

Personal details
- Party: Democratic
- Education: Benedict College

James Fabor is an American politician, and a member of the Democratic party.

== Political career ==
Faber was elected Mayor of Eastover, South Carolina in 2024.

Faber is a former member of the South Carolina House of Representatives from the 70th District, serving from 1985 to 1990. He resigned his seat after pleading guilty to charges in the Operation Lost Trust case.
