= Joseph Neal =

American politician

Joe Neal

Member of the South Carolina House of Representatives from the 70th district
- In office 1993–2017
- Preceded by: Levola S.Taylor
- Succeeded by: Wendy Brawley

Personal details
- Born: August 31, 1950 Hopkins, South Carolina, U.S.
- Died: February 14, 2017 (aged 66) Columbia, South Carolina, U.S.
- Party: Democratic
- Education: Benedict College; Colgate Rochester Crozer; Divinity School; Pittsburgh Theological; Seminary

Joseph H. Neal (August 31, 1950 – February 14, 2017) was an American politician. He was a member of the South Carolina House of Representatives from the 70th District, serving from 1993 until his death in 2017. He was a member of the Democratic party.

He died on February 14, 2017, at the age of 66.
