= Brandon Cox (politician) =

American politician

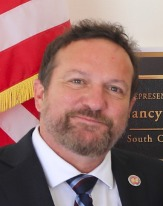
- Cox in 2025

Member of the South Carolina House of Representatives from the 92nd district
- Incumbent
- Assumed office November 14, 2022
- Preceded by: Joseph Daning
- Succeeded by: Byron Walters

Personal details
- Born: Fayetteville, North Carolina
- Party: Republican

Brandon L. Cox is an American Republican from South Carolina. Since 2022, he has been a member of the South Carolina House of Representative for the 92nd district.

== Political career ==
=== Municipal office ===
Cox previously served on the Goose Creek, South Carolina, city council.

=== 2022 South Carolina House of Representatives election ===
In 2023, Cox co-sponsored legislation with Rep. Jermaine Johnson to place a monument on the South Carolina State House grounds honoring Robert Smalls. In 2024, Cox was among the state legislators appointed to serve on the Robert Smalls Monument Commission.

=== 2026 South Carolina House of Representatives election ===
In March 2026, Byron Walters filed to challenge Cox for South Carolina House District 92. Walters defeated Cox with a 51% result.
