= Julius Murray =

American politician

Member of the South Carolina House of Representatives from the 70th district
- In office 1979–1983
- Succeeded by: James Faber

Personal details
- Born: March 23, 1938 Hopkins, South Carolina, U.S.
- Died: September 8, 2019 (aged 81) Columbia, South Carolina, U.S.
- Party: Democratic

Julius Murray (March 23, 1938 – September 8, 2019) was an American politician. He was a member of the South Carolina House of Representatives from the 70th District, serving from 1979 to 1983.

== Early life and education ==
Murray was born in Kingsville, South Carolina near Gadsden. He graduated from Webber High School and Columbia College of Missouri. Murray was a member of Alpha Phi Alpha fraternity and retired from the US Air Force as a master sergeant, serving from 1955 to 1976. Murray fought in the Vietnam War and was one of the first black Air Force recruiters in the southeast.

== Political career ==
In 1976, Murray became one of the first African-Americans elected to Richland County Council. He was the first African-American vice-chairman on council. Murray served in the South Carolina House of Representatives and was a member of the South Carolina Legislative Black Caucus. In 1989, Murray was the first African-American appointed to the South Carolina Alcoholic Beverage Control Commission.

Murray later served on the Richland County Planning Commission.

== Personal life and death ==
In 1961, Murray married Gertrude Mitchell. They had three children.

Murray died on September 8, 2019. He is buried at Fort Jackson National Cemetery.

== Awards and recognitions ==
Murray received “The Airman’s Award for Heroism,” the nation’s highest peacetime award.

Murray was recognized in 2012 by the South Carolina legislature with a highway sign bearing his name at the intersection of Atlas and Veteran's roads.
