= Levola S. Taylor =

American politician

Member of the South Carolina House of Representatives from the 70th district
- In office 1991–1992
- Preceded by: James Faber
- Succeeded by: Joseph Neal

Personal details
- Party: Democratic

Levola S. Taylor is an American politician. She is a former member of the South Carolina House of Representatives from the 70th District, serving from 1991-1992. Taylor is a member of the Democratic party.

She was preceded by James Faber, and succeeded by Joseph Neal. When Neal died in February 2017, Taylor was among a number of Democrats to file for the seat in a special election. Wendy Brawley went on to win the Democratic nomination and the special election.

Taylor was among a number of African American women from around the United States who endorsed Hillary Rodham Clinton for President in 2016.
