= Byron Walters =

American politician

Member of the South Carolina House of Representatives from the 92nd district
- Incumbent
- Assumed office December 2026
- Preceded by: Brandon Cox

Personal details
- Party: Democratic

Byron Walters is an American politician from South Carolina. A member of the Democratic Party, he is a member-elect of the South Carolina House of Representative for the 92nd district.

== Career ==
On March 23, 2026, Walters filed to challenge Brandon Cox for South Carolina House District 92.

Walters defeated Cox with a 51% result.
