= Malcolm Tink Taylor =

American politician

Member of the New Hampshire House of Representatives from the Grafton 9th district
- In office 1974–1978

Personal details
- Party: Republican; Independent

Malcolm Tink Taylor is an American politician. He served as a Republican member for the Grafton 9th district of the New Hampshire House of Representatives.

== Life and career ==
Taylor was a state trooper, journalist and teacher.

In 1974, Taylor was elected to the New Hampshire House of Representatives along with Harold V. Buckman in the general election for the Grafton 9th district.
