= Jermaine Johnson (politician) =

American politician and basketball player (born 1985)

Member of the South Carolina House of Representatives
- Incumbent
- Assumed office December 4, 2020
- Preceded by: Jimmy Bales
- Succeeded by: Malcolm Taylor (South Carolina politician)
- Constituency: 80th district (2020–2022); 70th district (2022–2024); 52nd district (2024–present)

Personal details
- Born: Jermaine Lafrance Johnson; July 4, 1985 (age 41) Los Angeles, California, U.S.
- Party: Democratic
- Education: College of Charleston (BA); Strayer University (MS); Northcentral University (DBA)
- Website: Campaign website
- Basketball career

Personal information
- Listed height: 6 ft 7 in (2.01 m)
- Listed weight: 250 lb (113 kg)

Career information
- High school: The Winchendon School (Winchendon, Massachusetts)
- College: College of Charleston (2005–2009)
- NBA draft: 2009: undrafted
- Playing career: 2009–2015
- Position: Power forward / center
- Number: 5, 19

Career history
- 2009–2010: Reno Bighorns
- 2010: Libertadores de Querétaro
- 2010: Mineros de Fresnillo
- 2010–2011: Jaguares de la Bahia Riviera Nayarit
- 2011: Cidade dé Barreiro
- 2011–2012: Franca
- 2012: Pavos de Nuevo Casas Grandes
- 2012: Mineros de Fresnillo
- 2012–2013: Gigantes Edomex
- 2013: Soles de Ojinaga
- 2013–2014: Ottawa SkyHawks
- 2014: London Lightning
- 2014–2015: Abejas de León
- 2015: Soles de Ojinaga

Career highlights
- NBL Canada All-Star (2014); SoCon Freshman of the Year (2006); Second-team All-SoCon (2008); Third-team All-SoCon (2009)

Jermaine Lafrance Johnson Sr. (born July 4, 1985) is an American politician, political advisor and former professional basketball player. A member of the Democratic Party, he is a member for South Carolina House of Representatives, representing the 52nd district. On January 14, 2026, Johnson announced that he would not run for re-election to the South Carolina House of Representatives, opting for a gubernatorial run. Johnson was defeated in the gubernatorial race by Republican State attorney general Alan Wilson in the general election.

== Early life and education ==
Johnson was born on July 4, 1985, in Los Angeles, California. During his childhood he experienced significant economic hardship, including periods of housing instability that led his family to live in motels following evictions. His father spent time in prison, and his brother served in the military.

Johnson attended multiple high schools, including Trinity-Pawling School, and Redemption Christian Academy, before graduating from the The Winchendon School. His involvement in basketball helped him gain access to preparatory schools, and pursue opportunities in higher education.

Johnson earned a Bachelor of Arts from the College of Charleston in 2008, a Master of Science in Management from Strayer University in 2014, and a Doctorate of Business Administration and Organizational Leadership from Northcentral University in 2018.

== Athletic career ==
=== Amateur career ===
Johnson developed his basketball skills through the Amateur Athletic Union, where his coach helped him pursue opportunities to attend preparatory schools.

In high school, Johnson committed to the College of Charleston. Three months into his redshirt freshman season, Johnson got into an altercation with his teammate Jeff Horowitz. Johnson intended to transfer to Long Beach State, but ended up staying at CofC.

In 2008, Johnson scored the first points in the TD Arena for the Cougars.

Johnson served as Charleston's captain during his senior year. He finished his career as one of only four players in school history with at least 1,100 points and 850 rebounds.

=== Professional career ===
The Reno Bighorns selected Johnson in the sixth round of the NBA Development Draft. He was released from the team after one year. He trained with James Harden and Amar'e Stoudemire during summer workouts in Los Angeles.

Johnson played more than six years professionally overseas, including in France, Mexico, Hungary and Canada. He starred during his time in the Mexican Basketball League where he averaged 21 points and 8 rebounds per game.

== Political career ==
=== South Carolina House of Representatives ===
In 2020, Johnson announced he would challenge Democratic incumbent Jimmy Bales for his seat in the South Carolina House of Representatives. Johnson centered his campaign around universal basic income, community investment, economic investment, district enhancement and access and accountability. He earned endorsements from former 2020 presidential candidate Andrew Yang, former South Carolina State Representative and current CNN political analyst Bakari Sellers and current South Carolina State Representative JA Moore. In June 2020, Johnson defeated Bales in the Democratic Primary and became the Democratic nominee.

After redistricting following the 2020 United States census, Johnson's district was merged into House District 70. This forced Johnson to run in a contested primary against fellow-representative Wendy Brawley. In the primary, Johnson garnered 50.11% percent of the vote to defeat Brawley by 115 votes.

Johnson currently serves on the House Labor, Commerce and Industry Committee. Past service includes the House Education and Public Works Committee. He is Secretary of the House Minority Caucus.

In 2023, Johnson co-sponsored legislation with Representative Brandon Cox to place a monument on the South Carolina State House grounds honoring Robert Smalls. In 2024, Johnson was among the state legislators appointed to serve on the Robert Smalls Monument Commission.

On January 14, 2026, Johnson announced that he would not run for re-election to the South Carolina House of Representatives, opting to focus instead on his gubernatorial run. He was succeeded by member-elect Malcolm Taylor (South Carolina politician).

=== 2026 gubernatorial campaign ===
On May 31, 2025, Johnson formed an exploratory committee to consider a run in the 2026 South Carolina gubernatorial election. On October 28, 2025, he announced his candidacy.

In March 2026, rumors surfaced that Johnson was planning to quit the gubernatorial race, due to viability concerns related to fundraising, race and the possible entry of former Bill Clinton and Dick Riley administration official Billy Webster into the Democratic primary. On March 21, and in a March 22 interview, Johnson confirmed that he had considered quitting but was encouraged by supporters to remain in the race and South Carolina Democratic Party Chair Christale Spain disputed claims that the state party was behind efforts to push Johnson out. Johnson officially filed for governor on March 23, 2026.

On June 9, 2026, Johnson became the Democratic nominee for governor. On July 30, 2026, Charleston businessman Sam Skardon was announced as Johnson's running mate.

On November 3, 2026, Johnson was defeated by Republican nominee Alan Wilson.

== Political Views ==
=== Education ===
Johnson supports increased investment in public education and opposes directing public funds toward private-school vouchers until South Carolina's public education system has been improved. He has proposed a statewide audit of K-12 education to evaluate school performance, funding, and administrative costs. He also supports expanding trade schools and technical education programs, drawing on his work establishing the Lower Richland Tech Academy.

=== Healthcare ===
Johnson supports expanding Medicaid eligibility and improving access to healthcare in rural communities. His gubernatorial platform proposes funding additional rural hospitals and increasing investment in mental-health services. He also has advocated legalizing medical cannabis as a treatment option.

=== Abortion and reproductive rights ===
Johnson supports protecting reproductive rights and opposes further restrictions on abortion. He has argued that medical decisions concerning reproductive health should be made by patients, their families, and their doctors. He has also proposed giving female legislators a central role in developing legislation concerning women's reproductive rights.

=== Criminal justice and public safety ===
Johnson supports investing in law enforcement while expanding community-based approaches to public safety. His platform proposes increasing law-enforcement staffing and salaries, establishing mental-health response teams to handle certain crises without armed police intervention, and strengthening relationships between law enforcement and local communities. He also supports a state hate-crimes law.

=== Infrastructure and economic development ===
Johnson has made roads, bridges, broadband access, and rural economic development central to his political agenda. He supports allowing municipalities greater flexibility to repair local roads using state transportation funds and has proposed requiring the state to develop greater in-state production capacity for food, energy, and water resources. He has also called for a statewide moratorium on new data centers until lawmakers establish regulations addressing their resource use, energy demands, and effects on local communities.

=== Immigration ===
Johnson has expressed support for immigration enforcement conducted in coordination with local authorities. During the 2026 Democratic gubernatorial primary, he and other candidates criticized aspects of federal Immigration and Customs Enforcement operations that they considered insufficiently coordinated with local communities. Johnson's position, as reported during the primary, emphasized cooperation between federal and local authorities rather than uncoordinated enforcement actions.

=== Civil rights and equality ===
Johnson opposed an anti-diversity, equity, and inclusion provision in the South Carolina Legislature and supports enacting a state hate-crimes law. His platform presents the latter as a measure to protect residents from crimes motivated by prejudice.

=== Data centers and energy ===
Johnson supports a statewide pause on the construction of new data centers until South Carolina establishes a regulatory framework governing their energy and water consumption and community impacts. He has argued that companies developing data centers should bear greater responsibility for the resources their facilities require. His position is focused on establishing safeguards before additional projects proceed.

=== Family Policy ===
Johnson supports policies intended to strengthen family involvement and parental participation in children's lives. His platform proposes encouraging employers to provide paid family leave for fathers, promoting flexible work schedules for parents, and establishing a Governor's Commission on Fathers and Families to coordinate related policies.

== Electoral history ==
=== 2020 South Carolina House of Representatives ===
South Carolina House of Representatives District 80 Democratic Primary, 2020
Party	Candidate	Votes	%
Democratic	Jermaine Johnson	3,573	75.6
Democratic	Jimmy Bales (incumbent)	1,156	24.4
Total votes		4,729	100.0

South Carolina House of Representatives District 80 General Election, 2020
Party	Candidate	Votes	%
Democratic	Jermaine Johnson	10,742	59.6
Republican	Vincent Wilson	7,268	40.3
Total votes		18,010	100.0

=== 2022 South Carolina House of Representatives ===
South Carolina House of Representatives District 70 Democratic Primary, 2022
Party	Candidate	Votes	%
Democratic	Jermaine Johnson (incumbent)	2,495	50.1
Democratic	Wendy Brawley (incumbent)	2,380	47.8
Democratic	Bridgette Jones Larry	104	2.1
Total votes		5,046	100.0

South Carolina House of Representatives District 70 General Election, 2022
Party	Candidate	Votes	%
Democratic	Jermaine Johnson	10,046	76.4
Republican	Vincent Wilson	2,623	20.0
Green	Charla Henson-Simons	456	3.5
Total votes		13,143	100.0

== Personal life ==
Johnson lives with his wife and four children in South Carolina.

Party political offices
Preceded by Joe Cunningham	Democratic nominee for Governor of South Carolina; 2026	Most recent
