= Wendy Brawley =

American politician

Member of the South Carolina House of Representatives from the 70th district
- In office June 20, 2017 – November 14, 2022
- Preceded by: Joseph Neal
- Succeeded by: Jermaine Johnson

Personal details
- Born: October 11, 1958 (age 67) Queens, New York, United States
- Party: Democratic
- Education: University of South Carolina (B.A.); Webster University (M.A.)

Wendy C. Brawley is an American politician. She is a former member of the South Carolina House of Representatives from the 70th District, serving since 2017. She is a member of the Democratic party. She was defeated by Democrat Jermaine Johnson in the 2022 Democratic primary election.

== Political career ==
In January 2020, Brawley endorsed Democratic Senator Elizabeth Warren of Massachusetts for the Presidency of the United States.

In May 2022, she sponsored a bill that would stop schools from sending lunch debts to collection agencies. The bill was passed unanimously in South Carolina House and Senate.

== Electoral history ==
=== 2016 SC Senate ===
Brawley unsuccessfully sought the Democratic nomination for the South Carolina Senate's 21st district in 2016. Incumbent Darrell Jackson went on to win the general election unopposed.

South Carolina Senate District 21 Democratic Primary, 2016
Party	Candidate	Votes	%
Democratic	Darrell Jackson (incumbent)	6,289	61.8
Democratic	Wendy Brawley	3,894	38.2
Total votes		10,183	100.0

=== 2017 SC House of Representatives special election ===
After the death of South Carolina congressman Joseph Neal in February 2017, his District 70 seat became vacant. Brawley finished first in the primary, but did not secure 50% of the vote, and therefore advanced to the runoff. Brawley defeated H. Heath Hill in the runoff and advanced to the general election as the Democratic nominee.

South Carolina House of Representatives District 70 Democratic Primary, 2017
Party	Candidate	Votes	%
Democratic	Wendy Brawley	1,199	40.6
Democratic	H. Heath Hill	706	23.9
Democratic	Levola S.Taylor	376	12.7
Democratic	Norman Jackson Jr.	289	9.8
Democratic	Jermaine Walker	251	8.5
Democratic	George Wilson	102	3.5
Democratic	Harry Reese, Sr.	20	0.9
Democratic	Patrick Morris	9	0.3
Total votes		2,952	100.0

South Carolina House of Representatives District 70 General Election, 2017
Party	Candidate	Votes	%
Democratic	Wendy Brawley	2,522	78.1
Republican	Bill Strickland	705	21.8
Write-in		3	0.1
Total votes		3,230	100.0
Democratic hold			

=== 2018 SC House of Representatives ===
Brawley was the only Democrat to run in 2018, so there was no Democratic primary.

South Carolina House of Representatives District 70 General Election, 2018
Party	Candidate	Votes	%
Democratic	Wendy Brawley (incumbent)	9,820	98.2
Write-in		179	1.8
Total votes		9,999	100.0
Democratic hold			

=== 2022 SC House of Representatives ===
After redistricting following the 2020 United States census, Rep. Jermaine Johnson's House District 80 was merged into House District 70, leading to a contest between Brawley and Johnson. In the June Primary, Johnson garnered 50.11% person of the vote to defeat Brawley by 115 votes.

South Carolina House of Representatives District 70 Democratic Primary, 2022
Party	Candidate	Votes	%
Democratic	Jermaine Johnson (incumbent)	2,495	50.1
Democratic	Wendy Brawley (incumbent)	2,380	47.8
Democratic	Bridgette Jones Larry	104	2.1
Total votes		5,046	100.0

== Personal life ==
Brawley was born in Queens and currently resides in Hopkins, South Carolina. She is married to her husband, Paul, with whom she has two children: Paul Jr. and Kanita.
