= Lori Kido Lopez =

American media activist and academic

Lori Kido Lopez is an American media activist and a professor of Media and Cultural Studies at the University of Wisconsin-Madison, whose research centers on depictions of Asian Americans in modern media. Additionally, she is affiliate faculty in the Department of Women's Studies and the director of the Asian American Studies Program. She most notably wrote Asian American Media Activism: Fighting for Cultural Citizenship, which was published in 2016 by New York University Press. She is also a Co-Editor of the Routledge Companion to Asian American Media. Lopez’s work explores minorities’ use of media to gain social justice.

== Early life and education ==
Lori Kido Lopez is from Portland, Oregon, and was born to parents Sharlene and Doug DesRochers with siblings Keith DesRochers and Kelli Ledeen. She got her undergraduate degree from Pomona College and continued on to graduate school at Indiana University Bloomington where she earned a masters in mass communication. Lopez then received her PhD in communication at the University of Southern California. In 2005 and 2006 Lopez was a production assistant for the films “Novel Romance,” “The Ape,” and “Fool's Gold.”

== Career and activism ==
Lopez is a professor at University of Wisconsin-Madison where she teaches a media analysis course as well as courses evaluating the relationship between identity and media using feminist theory, critical race theory, and media theory to analyze how marginalized communities have been portrayed in media over time and how they have engaged with this.

== Awards ==
She was recently chosen to be the 2017 recipient of the Early Career Achievement Award from the Association for Asian American Studies. In 2015, Lopez was honored as one of UW-Madison's Outstanding Women of Color. This award recognizes members of the university's community for "social justice; advocacy for disadvantaged and/or marginalized populations; scholarly research, writing, speaking and/or teaching about race, ethnicity and indigeneity in American society; and community building to create an inclusive and respectful environment on or off campus."

== Other activities ==
In 2016, Lopez started "Asian-American Media Spotlight", an annual film festival in Madison, Wisconsin, showcasing films created by Asian-Americans. This is the first Asian American film festival in Madison, and was created in order for underrepresented people to be able to see images of themselves on screen and to overall create greater exposure for these films to wider audiences. Lopez started the Race & Media conference in 2014, which is now an annual conference. It highlights the intersection between critical race theory and media studies by gathering scholars from various fields. Lopez is on the board of Freedom Inc., a black and Hmong queer anti-violence organization located in Madison, Wisconsin. She is also a former board member of the Media Action Network for Asian Americans (MANAA), the first organization specifically dedicated to monitoring all forms of media to advocate for "balanced, sensitive, and positive" portrayals of Asian Americans. Past Projects include protesting against the lack of Asian American actors in the 2010 film The Last Airbender, which is based on an animation that takes place in an Asian universe and promoting television studios to air shows such as ABC's Fresh Off the Boat and Fox's The Mindy Project. While in Madison, she is currently studying communication patterns among Hmong Americans through broadcast media. In her research she is focused on how Hmong Americans are making media, what media they pay attention to, and how they are connecting to Hmong people all over the world through mobile media and digital media.

== Books ==
=== Asian American Media Activism: Fighting for Cultural Citizenship ===
Asian American Media Activism: Fighting for Cultural Citizenship focuses on the often overlooked stories of Asian Americans who have been fighting for decades to end stereotypical portrayals of Asians in the media as well as their under-representation in film and television. Lopez explores the history of Asian American media activism through a wide array of forms and tries to understand what needs to happen in order for Asian American voices to be heard. Ultimately she finds that the Asian American fight must be understood as fighting for cultural citizenship and belonging in a nation that has long rejected them.

=== Routledge Companion to Asian American Media ===
Routledge Companion to Asian American Media examines the history of how Asian Americans have engaged with media through mainstream film and television to digital media. The essays included explore a wide array of topics such as intersectional Asian identities, transnational and diasporic media, and interactions with new media.
