= Harold V. Buckman =

American politician (1912–1983)

Member of the New Hampshire House of Representatives
- In office 1968–1970

Member of the New Hampshire House of Representatives from the Grafton 17th district
- In office 1970–1972

Member of the New Hampshire House of Representatives from the Grafton 9th district
- In office 1972–1983

Personal details
- Born: December 6, 1912 Woodstock, Vermont, U.S.
- Died: February 1, 1983 (aged 70)
- Party: Republican

Harold V. Buckman (December 6, 1912 – February 1, 1983) was an American politician. He served as a Republican member for the Grafton 9th and 17th district of the New Hampshire House of Representatives.

== Life and career ==
Buckman was born in Woodstock, Vermont.

Buckman served in the New Hampshire House of Representatives from 1968 to 1983.

Buckman died on February 1, 1983, at the age of 70.
