= Malcolm Taylor (South Carolina politician) =

American politician

Member of the South Carolina House of Representatives
- Incumbent
- Assumed office December 2026
- Preceded by: Jermaine Johnson (politician)
- Constituency: 52nd district

Personal details
- Party: Democratic

Malcolm Taylor is an American politician. A member of the Democratic Party, he is a member-elect for South Carolina House of Representatives, representing the 52nd district.

== Early life and career ==
Taylor lives in Eastover, South Carolina and has a background in law enforcement.

== Political career ==
=== 2026 South Carolina House of Representatives election ===
On January 14, 2026, Democratic incumbent Jermaine Johnson announced that he would not run for re-election to the South Carolina House of Representatives, opting to focus instead on his gubernatorial run. In March of that year, Taylor announced his candidacy for the seat. Taylor filed for the Democratic Primary, along with Lawrence Moore and Patrick Tate. No one filed for the Republican Primary.

Taylor defeated Moore and Tate with 61% of the vote. He went on to win the general election unopposed.

== Electoral history ==
South Carolina House of Representatives District 52 Democratic Primary, 2026
Party	Candidate	Votes	%
Democratic	Malcolm Taylor	3,912	61.7
Democratic	Lawrence Moore	1,518	23.9
Democratic	Patrick Tate	909	14.3
Total votes		6,339	100.0

South Carolina House of Representatives District 52 General Election, 2026
Party	Candidate	Votes	%
Democratic	Malcolm Taylor	13,089	
Total votes		13,089	100.0
