= Political positions of Nikki Haley =

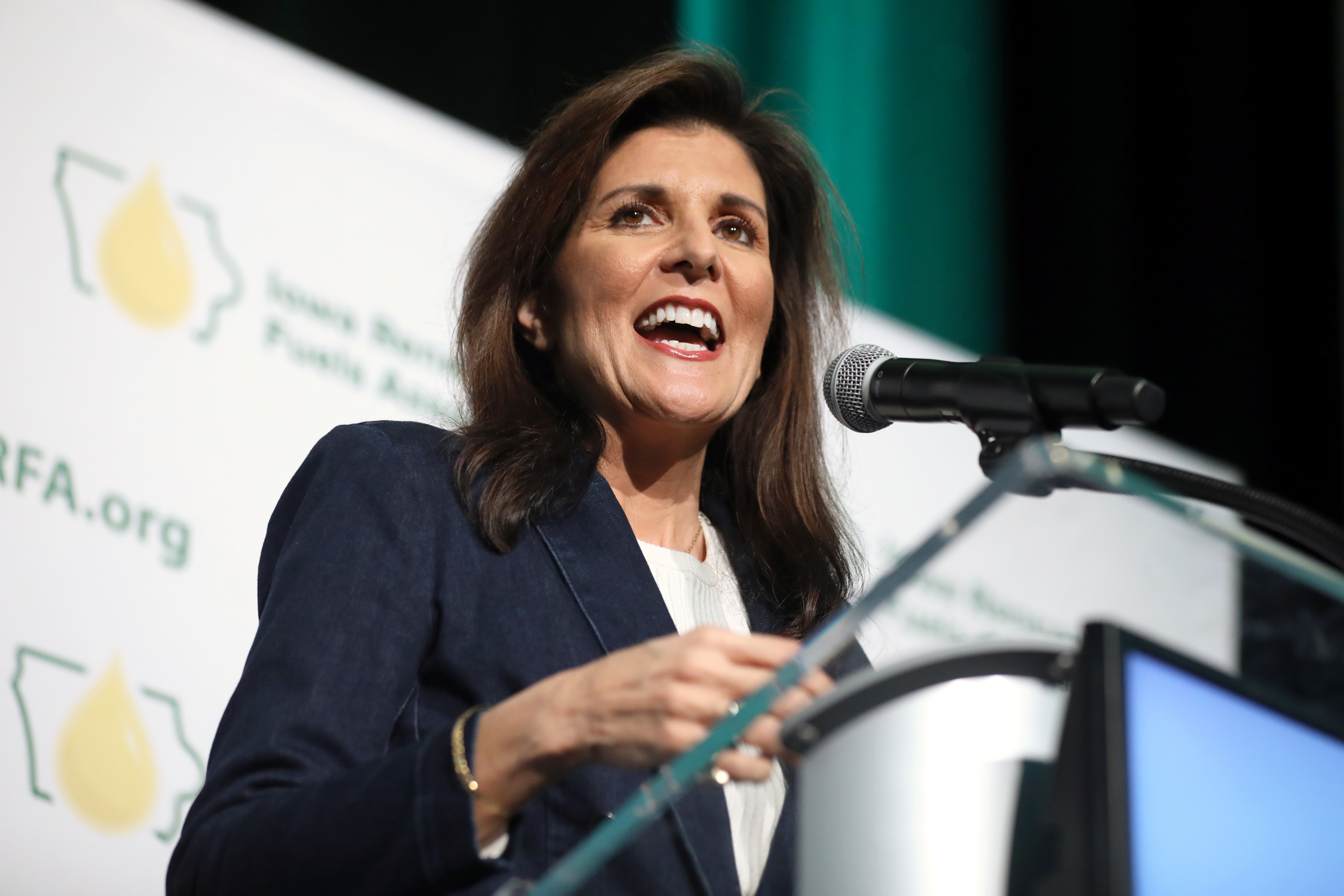
Haley at a campaign rally in 2024

The political positions of Republican Governor Nikki Haley have been reported from her career in the South Carolina House of Representatives, during her 2011–2017 governorship, from her books Can't Is Not an Option and With All Due Respect, and during her tenure as United States Ambassador to the United Nations from January 2017 until the very end of 2018. Some of these policy positions have changed, while others remain unmodified.

== Economic policy ==
=== Policy in South Carolina House ===
One of Haley's stated goals was to lower taxes. When Mark Sanford was governor of South Carolina, Haley voted against a proposed cigarette surtax despite criticism that the revenue from the tax would have been used for smoking prevention programs and cancer research related to smoking. She voted for a bill that raised sales taxes from 5% to 6%. The bill exempted sales tax on unprepared food such as canned goods. The same bill also exempts property tax on "owner-occupied residential property" except for the taxes due from what is still owed on the property.

=== Policy as Governor of South Carolina ===
Upon becoming governor, Haley appointed Bobby Hitt as the state's secretary of commerce. Under their leadership, the state announced the recruitment of more than 85,000 new jobs and $21.5 billion in capital investment.

In inviting business to move to South Carolina, she has said:

What I'm saying is, if you come to South Carolina, the cost of doing business is going to be low here. We are going to make sure that you have a loyal, willing workforce and we are going to be one of the lowest union-participation states in the country.

== Foreign policy ==
=== China ===
On numerous occasions, Haley has spoken out against the human rights abuses against Uyghurs in Xinjiang by the Chinese Communist Party, calling for a boycott of the 2022 Olympic Games. She has also claimed that the CCP has a "stranglehold" on the World Health Organization.

=== Iran ===
In April 2017, while holding her first session as president of the UN Security Council, Haley charged Iran and Hezbollah with having "conducted terrorist acts" for decades within the Middle East.

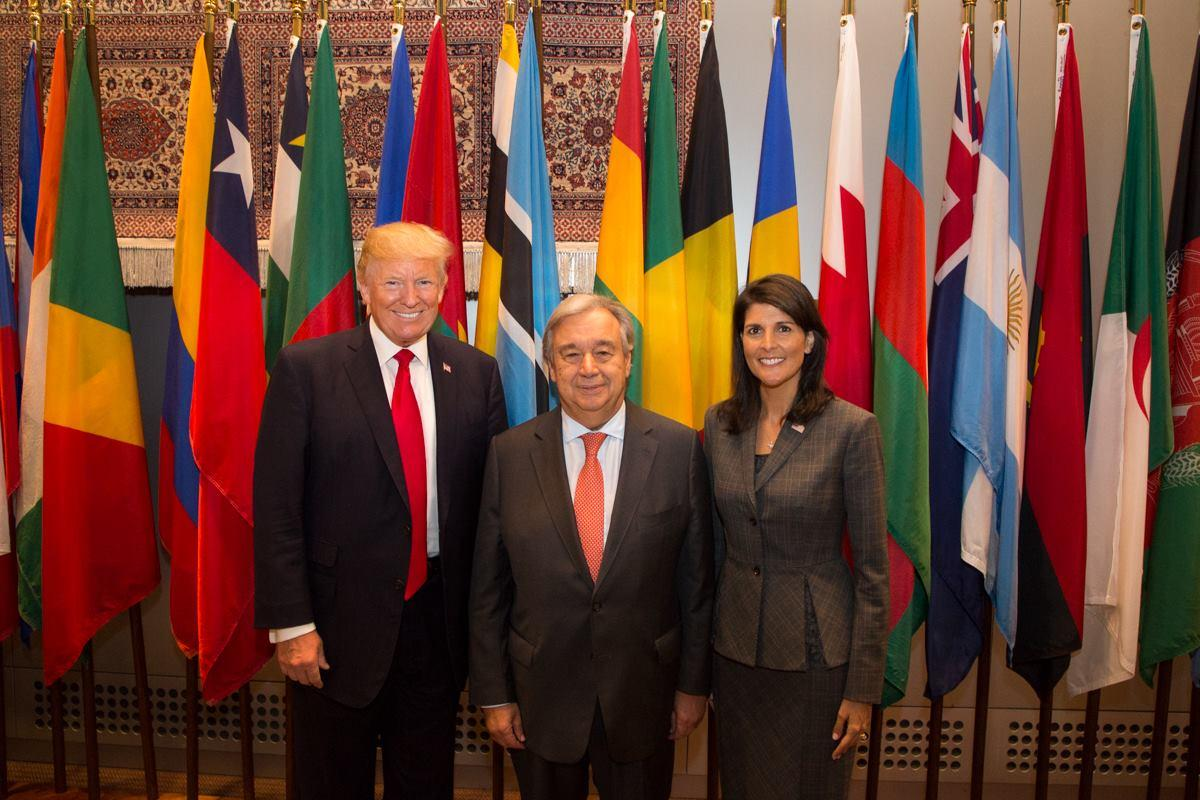
Haley alongside President Donald Trump and United Nations Secretary-General António Guterres

In September 2017, Haley stated that "some countries" (a reference to Russia, although Haley did not refer to Russia by name) were shielding Iran by blocking the International Atomic Energy Agency from verifying Iranian compliance with the international nuclear agreement with Iran. Haley said that it "appears that some countries are attempting to shield Iran from even more inspections. Without inspections, the Iran deal is an empty promise."

Also in December 2017, Haley accused Iran of backing the Houthi rebels in Yemen. The Houthis are fighting the Saudi-backed Hadi government. She said that the "fight against Iranian aggression is the world's fight." Iranian U.N. mission spokesman Alireza Miryusefi said in response that "These accusations seek also to cover up for the Saudi war crimes in Yemen, with the US complicity, and divert attention from the stalemate war of aggression against the Yemenis." Iran likened Haley's presentation to that of Secretary of State Colin Powell before the 2003 invasion of Iraq. Haley also said that "It's hard to find a conflict or terrorist group in the Middle East that doesn't have Iran's fingerprints all over it."

=== Israel ===
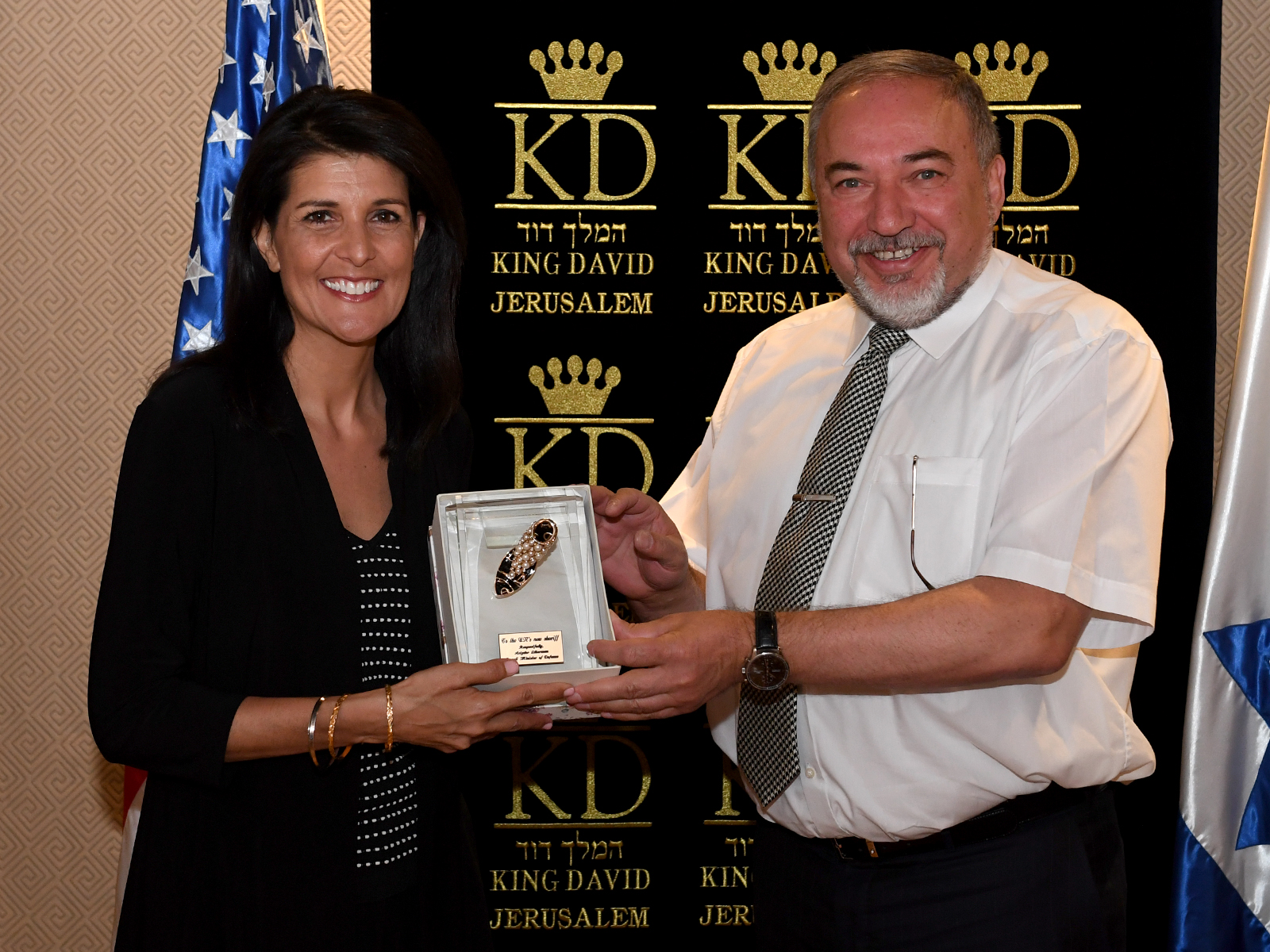
Haley with Israeli defense minister Avigdor Lieberman in 2017

Haley has been described by Senator Lindsey Graham as a "strong supporter of the State of Israel". As governor of South Carolina, she signed into law a bill to stop efforts of the Boycott, Divestment and Sanctions (BDS) movement. This legislation was the first of its kind on a statewide level. Haley also stated that "nowhere has the UN's failure been more consistent and more outrageous than in its bias against our close ally Israel".

In May 2017 interview, Haley expressed interest in moving the U.S. embassy to Israel from Tel Aviv to Jerusalem. On June 7, Haley charged the U.N. with having "bullied Israel for a very long time" and pledged the US would end this treatment while in Jerusalem. During the 1967 war, Israel gained control of East Jerusalem, which had previously been annexed by Jordan. The Jerusalem Law declared Jerusalem to be Israel's "undivided capital".

In July 2017, after the UNESCO voted to designate the Hebron's Old City and the Cave of the Patriarchs as Palestinian territory as well as endangered world heritage sites, Haley called the choice "tragic on several levels" in a statement (see Israeli–Palestinian conflict in Hebron).

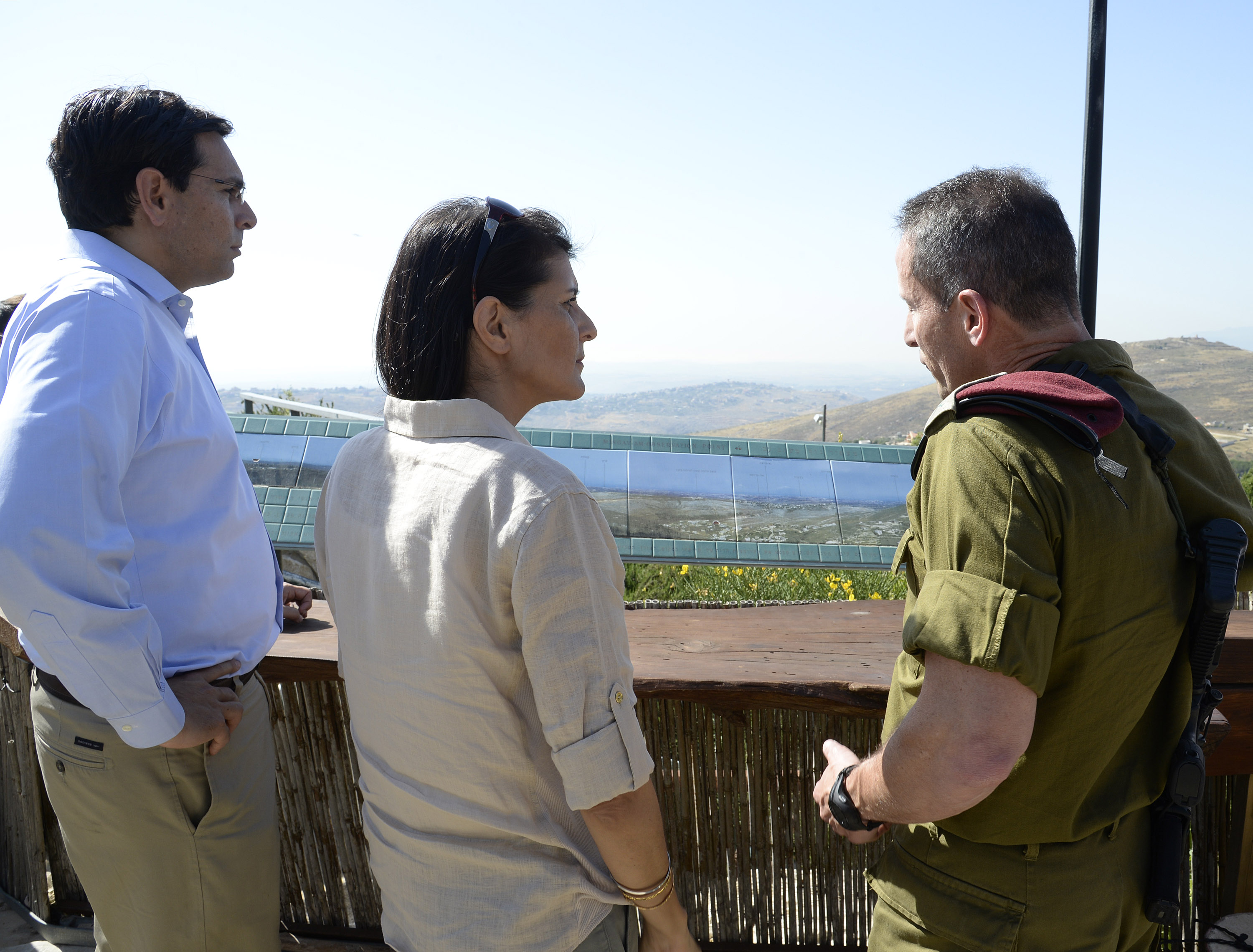
Haley in Golan Heights – captured from Syria in the Six-Day War and formally annexed by Israel in 1981 – in June 2017

Egypt sponsored a Security Council resolution voiding any unilateral decisions on Jerusalem's status. The resolution further demanded that countries "refrain from the establishment of diplomatic missions in the holy city." In December 2017, Haley warned UN members that she would be "taking names" of countries that voted to reject Trump's decision to recognize Jerusalem as the capital of Israel and move the U.S. embassy there from Tel Aviv. In a letter, Haley wrote: "As you consider your vote, I encourage you to know the president and the US take this vote personally. The president will be watching this vote carefully and has requested I report back on those who voted against us." The resolution still passed by an overwhelming margin: 128 in favour, 35 abstaining and only nine against. Haley even traveled to some countries that voted "No," such as Guatemala and Honduras, and thanked them for their support in the emergency special session.

=== Myanmar ===
In September 2017, Haley said that her government was "deeply troubled" by reports of atrocities against Rohingya Muslims in Myanmar. Haley criticized Myanmar's civilian leader Aung San Suu Kyi for "justifying the imprisonment of the two Reuters reporters who reported on the ethnic cleansing."

=== North Korea ===
Haley said the U.S. military could be deployed in response to any further North Korean missile tests or usage of nuclear missiles and that she believed Kim Jong-un understood this due to pressure by both the U.S. and China. On May 14, 2017, after North Korea performed a ballistic missile test, Haley said Kim was "in a state of paranoia" after feeling pressure from the U.S.

On June 2, 2017, after the U.N. Security Council approved a resolution adding 15 North Koreans and four entities linked to North Korea's nuclear and missile programs to a sanctions blacklist, Haley said the council's vote was "sending a clear message to North Korea today: Stop firing ballistic missiles or face the consequences". On July 5, 2017, during a U.N. Security Council meeting, in response to North Korea launching an intercontinental ballistic missile, Haley announced the US would within days "bring before the Security Council a resolution that raises the international response in a way that is proportionate to North Korea's new escalation".

The following month, the U.N. Security Council unanimously approved sanctions on North Korea banning exports worth over $1 billion. Haley said that the sanctions package was "the single largest ... ever leveled against the North Korean regime".

=== Russia ===
On February 2, 2017, Haley declared to the U.N. Security Council that sanctions against Russia for its Crimean conflict would not be lifted until Russia returned control over the region to Ukraine. On June 4, 2017, Haley reported the United States would retain "sanctions strong and tough when it comes to the issue in Ukraine".

=== Syria ===
On March 30, 2017, Haley stated that the U.S. would no longer focus on forcing Syrian president Bashar al-Assad to leave power. This was a policy shift from former president Barack Obama's initial stance on Assad. On April 5, speaking to the U.N. Security Council a day after the Khan Shaykhun chemical attack, Haley said Russia, Assad, and Iran "have no interest in peace" and attacks similar to this would continue occurring should nothing be done in response. A day later, the U.S. launched 59 Tomahawk cruise missiles toward the Shayrat Air Base in Syria. Haley called the strike a "very measured step" and warned that the U.S. was prepared "to do more" despite wishing it would not be required.

On April 12, after Russia blocked a draft resolution meant to condemn the Khan Shaykhun chemical attack, Haley criticized Russia, saying "We need to see Russia choose to side with the civilized world over an Assad government that brutally terrorizes its own people." On June 28, while appearing before the United States House Committee on Foreign Affairs, Haley credited Trump's warning to Syria with stopping another chemical attack: "I can tell you due to the president's actions, we did not see an incident."

== Social policy ==
=== Abortion ===
Haley describes herself as pro-life and has supported legislation to restrict abortion. She has stated "I'm not pro-life because the Republican Party tells me, I'm pro-life because all of us have had experiences of what it means to have one of these special little ones in our life."

Haley has consistently supported bills that give rights to an unborn baby and restrict abortion, except when the mother's life is at risk. In 2006, as a member of the South Carolina House of Representatives, Haley voted for the Penalties for Harming an Unborn Child/Fetus law, which asserted that an act of violence against a fetus is akin to a criminal act against the mother. She has also re-signed a new state law that bans abortions at 20 weeks of pregnancy.

Haley has voted in favor of some bills relating to abortion that were tabled or rejected, including the Inclusion of Unborn Child/Fetus in Definition for Civil Suits Amendment, Prohibiting Employment Termination Due to Abortion Waiting Period amendment, and Exempting Cases of Rape from Abortion Waiting Period amendment. The last would have allowed specific cases of people to not have to wait the mandatory 24 hours before having an abortion.

In 2023, Haley has called for "consensus" on national abortion policy, and indicated she would oppose a full ban on abortion. In a 2023 interview, she pointed to a proposal from Senator Lindsey Graham that would establish a national 15-week abortion ban, with exceptions for rape, incest, and health and life of the mother.

Haley is opposed to jail time or the death penalty for women who have abortions.

=== Confederate flag ===
See also: Modern display of the Confederate battle flag

Before June 2015, Haley supported flying the Confederate flag on the statehouse grounds. In the immediate aftermath of the Charleston church shooting, Haley did not take a position on removing the flag, saying, "I think the state will start talking about that again, and we'll see where it goes." On June 22, Haley called for the removal of the Confederate flag from the statehouse grounds. She stated:

"These grounds [the State Capital] are a place that everybody should feel a part of. What I realized now more than ever is people were driving by and felt hurt and pain. No one should feel pain." Haley also said, "There is a place for that flag," but she added, "It's not in a place that represents all people in South Carolina."

In July 2015, Haley signed a bill to authorize removing the Confederate flag from the flagpole on the grounds of the South Carolina Capitol. In December 2019, she defended the people of South Carolina, saying that "some people" in South Carolina saw the flag as a representation of "service and sacrifice and heritage" before the flag was hijacked by the white supremacist mass killer Dylann Roof.

=== Death penalty ===
In regard to the state trial of Dylann Roof, Haley urged prosecutors to seek the death penalty against him.

=== LGBT issues ===
In 2013, Haley said it was her constitutional duty to oppose federal regulation of gay marriage. In 2023, during a Des Moines Register Political Soapbox event, Nikki Haley responded to a question about her stance on gay marriage by asserting, "Get your news from somewhere else," and adding, "This is what I'll tell you: People should live the way they want to live. I believe in freedom. I believe in making sure that people can live the way they want to live, and I believe the government needs to stay out of the way."

In April 2016, Haley indicated she would not support legislation introduced by the South Carolina State Senate which would require transgender individuals to use restrooms based on biological sex instead of gender identity. Haley stated:

These are not instances that ... y'all haven't reported on anything. I haven't heard anything that's come to my office. So when I look at South Carolina, we look at our situations, we're not hearing of anybody's religious liberties that are being violated, and we're, again, not hearing any citizens that feel like they are being violated in terms of freedoms.

Haley described such restroom legislation as unnecessary.

In April 2017, Haley spoke out against Ramzan Kadyrov and the abuse and murder of gay men in Chechnya. She stated that "We continue to be disturbed by reports of kidnapping, torture, and murder of people in Chechnya based on their sexual orientation ... this violation of human rights cannot be ignored".

In 2023, Haley said that the Florida Parental Rights in Education Act, known as the "Don't Say Gay" law, doesn't go far enough, in that prohibitions against discussing sex and sexuality before third grade should be extended and subject to opt-in parental consent, stating, "When I was in school you didn't have sex ed until seventh grade. And even then, your parents had to sign whether you could take the class. That's a decision for parents to make."

=== Immigration ===
Haley has stated that, as a daughter of immigrants, she believes the immigration laws should be enforced. She voted in favor of a law that requires employers to be able to prove that newly hired employees are legal residents of the United States, and also requires all immigrants to carry documentation at all times proving that they are legally in the United States. Haley signed an "Arizona-style" law cracking down on illegal immigration in June 2011. The law was at the time the subject of a lawsuit initiated by the United States Justice Department on numerous grounds, including claims the immigration law violates the Supremacy Clause. Rob Godfrey, a spokesman for Haley, said, "If the feds were doing their job, we wouldn't have had to address illegal immigration reform at the state level. But, until they do, we're going to keep fighting in South Carolina to be able to enforce our laws."

On March 15, 2017, Haley said she would not support a ban on Muslim immigration to the United States should Trump choose to enact one. Haley said she did not believe "we should ever ban anyone based on their religion" and that a Muslim ban would be "un-American".

=== Voter ID laws ===
Haley supports voter ID laws, laws requiring photo identification at the polls.
