= With All Due Respect =

With All Due Respect may refer to:

- With All Due Respect (TV series), a Bloomberg Television series
- With All Due Respect (book), the memoirs of Nikki Haley

== See also ==
- All Due Respect (disambiguation)
