= All Due Respect =

All Due Respect may refer to:

- "All Due Respect" (The Sopranos), an episode of The Sopranos
- "All Due Respect" (The Wire), an episode of The Wire

== See also ==
- With All Due Respect (disambiguation)
