= William Michael Haley =

American businessman and officer (born 1970)

Michael Haley
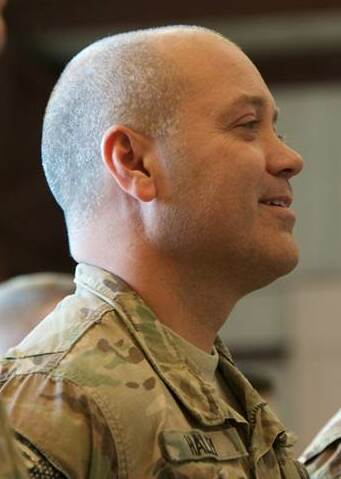
- Haley in 2013

First Gentleman of South Carolina
- In role January 12, 2011 – January 24, 2017
- Governor: Nikki Haley
- Preceded by: Jenny Sanford (First Lady)
- Succeeded by: Peggy McMaster (First Lady)

Personal details
- Born: William Michael Haley; February 7, 1970 (age 56)
- Spouse: Nikki Randhawa (m. 1996)
- Children: 2, including Nalin
- Education: Anderson University, University of North Carolina, Charlotte (BBA)

Military service
- Allegiance: United States
- Branch/service: United States Army
- Rank: Major
- Unit: South Carolina Army National Guard
- Battles/wars: War in Afghanistan

William Michael Haley (born February 7, 1970) is an American businessman and commissioned officer in the South Carolina Army National Guard who served as the first gentleman of South Carolina from 2011 to 2017, the first to hold the position. Haley is the husband of Nikki Haley, a former governor of South Carolina, ambassador of the US to the United Nations, and candidate for President of the United States in the 2024 Republican Party primaries.

== Early life ==
Originally from Ohio, Haley entered a foster home when he was two and was adopted by Bill and Carole Haley when he was four. His new father was a director of a steel-manufacturing plant, and his new mother taught school. He is a graduate of Hilton Head Preparatory School and was an undergraduate at Anderson University before graduating from the University of North Carolina at Charlotte with a degree in business administration.

Haley was known as William or Bill until 1989 when he met his future wife, Nikki, who started calling him by his middle name, Michael.

== Career ==
Haley worked at Exotica International, an upscale men's and women's clothing store owned by his mother-in-law. He worked for eight years as a federal technician in various positions in human resources with the South Carolina Army National Guard.

He spends his time as an investor and partner in several companies and is a member of several boards and advisory boards.

On July 31, 2022, an investigation by The Wall Street Journal found that Michael Haley and John Clyburn, brother of U.S. Representative of South Carolina Jim Clyburn, were given shares in a business profiting from the newly approved Catawba Two Kings Casino. The business, Kings Mountain Equipment Supply, leased slot machines to the casino, thereby financially benefitting Haley. Haley denied accusations of political kickbacks, saying his business consulted on physical and cybersecurity projects for the Catawba Casino project and was paid with a stake in the business.

=== Military service ===
Haley is an officer with the South Carolina Army National Guard and specializes in security cooperation.

In January 2012, Haley was deployed on a six-month tour of duty in Afghanistan as a captain in the South Carolina Army National Guard. The unit served in Helmand Province as an agribusiness development team helping Afghan farmers improve farming techniques and develop cash crops to replace opium poppies. Haley served as a liaison between the military and civilian authorities. He is thought to have been the first spouse of a governor to serve on active duty in a war zone.

Marines serving with Haley in Helmand Province nicknamed him FGOSC (First Gentleman of South Carolina).

External videos
- Departure ceremony for the South Carolina Army National Guard prior to deployment to the U.S. Africa Command, June 17, 2023, C-SPAN

Haley served an active duty deployment as a staff officer with the 218th Maneuver Enhancement Brigade in the Horn of Africa during 2023–2024.

=== First Gentleman of South Carolina ===
Since Haley is the first person to become first gentleman of South Carolina, and because there have only been fifteen first gentlemen in U.S. history, including the five men in that role as of 2015, there was speculation about what his role would be. Haley chaired the foundation that oversees the preservation and management of the South Carolina Governor's Mansion in Columbia.

=== Stand for America ===
Haley is listed as president of Stand for America, a policy and media organization that Nikki Haley started after leaving her position as UN ambassador. Internal Revenue Service paperwork from 2019 indicates that Michael Haley worked 40 hours per week at the New York-based organization and received no compensation.

== Personal life ==
Haley and Nimarata Nikki Randhawa met in 1989 while he was attending Anderson University and she was attending nearby Clemson University. They were married in 1996 in two ceremonies, a Sikh ceremony and a wedding at St. Andrew By-the-Sea United Methodist Church in Hilton Head Island, South Carolina, where Haley's parents, Carole and Bill Haley, reside.

Michael and Nikki Haley have two children, including Nalin.

Honorary titles
Preceded by Jenny Sanford	First Gentleman of South Carolina; 2011–2017	Succeeded by Peggy McMaster as First Lady of South Carolina
