= Nalin Haley =

American political activist

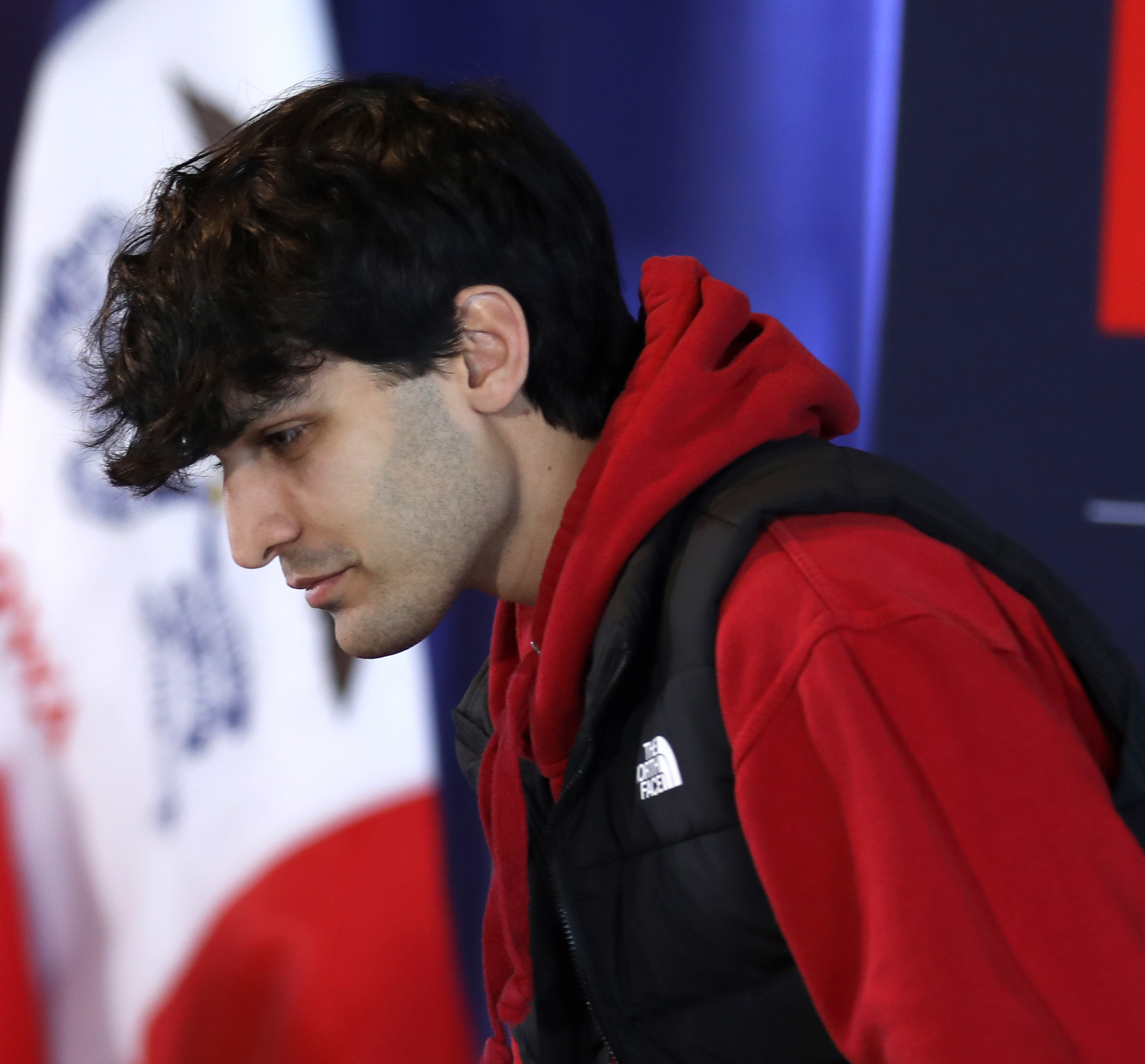
- Haley in 2024
- Born: September 6, 2001 (age 25)
- Education: Villanova University (BA)
- Known for: Political activism, son of Nikki Haley
- Parents: Nikki Haley; Michael Haley

Nalin Haley (/neɪˌlɪn/ Nay-lin, born September 6, 2001) is an American right-wing political activist and the son of Nikki Haley. A graduate of Villanova University, Haley has gained attention for his political activities, including campaigning for his mother during the 2024 Republican presidential primaries, and expressing support for right-wing beliefs on social media.

== Biography ==
Nalin Haley was born on September 6, 2001 to Nikki Haley (née Randhawa) and Michael Haley. He is the younger of two children. His mother entered politics while Haley was a child, and was elected Governor of South Carolina in 2010 as a Republican. On Palm Sunday in 2025, Haley was confirmed into the Catholic Church in a South Carolina parish. Haley attended high school in New York amidst his mother's tenure as ambassador to the United Nations, and studied at Villanova University, a Catholic university in Pennsylvania, majoring in political science.

During Nikki Haley's 2024 presidential run, Nalin campaigned alongside her, referring to Tim Scott, a South Carolina senator and Donald Trump surrogate, as "Senator Judas" at a campaign stop in Gilbert, South Carolina. Haley also expressed criticisms of Vivek Ramaswamy and Sunny Hostin, both of whom had spoken negatively about Nikki Haley.

Nalin's political views have been described as being further to the right than his mother's. Nalin has expressed opposition to pro-Israel lobbying in the United States. He opposes H-1B visas, accusing the program of "taking very average jobs like tech jobs for cheap that could go to Americans."
