= Jenny Sanford =

American businesswoman (born 1962)

First Lady of South Carolina
- In role January 15, 2003 – February 26, 2010
- Governor: Mark Sanford
- Preceded by: Rachel Hodges
- Succeeded by: Michael Haley (as First Gentleman)

Personal details
- Born: Jennifer Sullivan; September 11, 1962 (age 64) Winnetka, Illinois, U.S.
- Party: Republican
- Spouses: Mark Sanford (m. 1989; div. 2010); Andrew McKay (m. 2018)
- Children: 4
- Education: Georgetown University (BA)
- Website: Official website

Jennifer Sullivan Sanford (born September 11, 1962) is the former First Lady of South Carolina and a former investment banker. She was married to Governor Mark Sanford.

== Early life and education ==
Sanford was born and raised in Winnetka, Illinois, an upscale suburb of Chicago, the daughter of Susan Reynolds and John William Sullivan. She is the second of five children born to an Irish Catholic family. Sanford's family was prominent in the area. Her great-grandfather, Joseph W. Sullivan, co-founded Skil Corporation, which manufactured the first portable electric saw. Her uncle and another grandfather, both lawyers, headed the Winston and Strawn law firm. Sanford also is the niece of Anne Reynolds Skakel, who was the wife of Rushton Skakel, who in turn is the brother of Ethel Kennedy.

Sanford attended Woodlands Academy, an all-girls Catholic school in Lake Forest, Illinois. She earned a bachelor's degree, magna cum laude, from Georgetown University in 1984.

== Career ==
From 1984 until 1990, Sanford worked at Lazard Freres & Company, an investment bank based in New York City She eventually became a vice president in the firm's mergers and acquisitions group.

Sanford has long been rumored as a potential candidate for office in her own right. Following Senator Jim DeMint's resignation announcement, South Carolina Governor Nikki Haley, whose gubernatorial run Sanford had supported, included her on the shortlist of potential appointees to fill DeMint's vacant seat. After Haley appointed Rep. Tim Scott instead, both Jenny Sanford and Mark Sanford were mentioned as potential candidates for Scott's vacant house seat. On January 14, 2013, she announced she would not be a candidate in the election.

Sanford expressed interest in becoming President of the College of Charleston upon the retirement of P. George Benson in 2014. but subsequently withdrew her name for consideration.

In December 2013, Sanford was appointed to the Charleston County Aviation Authority Board.

During the 2014 election season, Sanford crossed party lines to endorse Ginny Deerin, the Democratic Party nominee for South Carolina Secretary of State who was running against Republican incumbent Mark Hammond.

In March 2015, Sanford expressed interest in becoming Director of the South Carolina Department of Health and Environmental Control.

== Personal life ==
=== Marriage to Mark Sanford ===
Sanford met her future husband, Mark Sanford, at a beach party in the Hamptons on Long Island. She later talked about the meeting in an interview with The Post and Courier: "It wasn’t exactly love at first sight. It was more like friendship at first sight." The couple married in 1989 and had four sons.

It was not until the couple's second son was born that Mark Sanford announced his entry into politics. She later told The Greenville News, "It was quite a surprise to me. When he told me, I was in the hospital, and we had just delivered our second son. So we had a 15-month-old and a newborn, and he says to me, ‘I’m going to run for Congress.’"

In 1994, she managed her husband's successful campaign for the United States House of Representatives, as well as his successful campaign for Governor of South Carolina in 2002.

Sanford also acted as her husband's advisor while he was in Congress. According to the governor's website, she assisted him daily during his first term as governor, and co-managed his successful re-election campaign in 2006. In 2005, she launched the Healthy South Carolina Challenge, an initiative to reduce the incidence of chronic preventable disease. She serves on the boards of several non-profits, including the Hollings Cancer Center, the Drayton Hall historical property in Charleston, the Coastal Community Foundation and the Children's Hospital Advisory Fund.

==== Marital problems and divorce ====
On June 24, 2009, after having been absent from South Carolina for several days, her husband admitted to an affair with a woman from Argentina identified in multiple press reports as María Belén Chapur. Sanford learned of her husband's infidelity in January 2009, before the scandal broke. Following her husband's public disclosure of the affair, she issued a statement indicating that the couple had agreed to a trial separation two weeks prior to his public confession.

On August 7, 2009, she moved out of the South Carolina Governor's Mansion with the couple's four sons and returned to the family home on Sullivan's Island. On December 11, 2009, she announced that she was filing for divorce. The Sanfords' divorce was finalized on March 19, 2010. She published a memoir, Staying True, which was released on February 5, 2010, which details her experience of her husband's affair and the effect it had on her own life.

On February 3, 2013, Sanford found Mark Sanford leaving her Sullivan's Island house. Under the terms of their divorce agreement, Mark was not allowed to visit Jenny's house without her permission. She filed a trespassing complaint against him the next day, alleging that Mark Sanford had repeatedly violated the agreement despite Jenny Sanford filing a "no trespass" letter with the Sullivan's Island Police Department. In a statement, Mark Sanford admitted that he had gone to the house to watch the second half of Super Bowl XLVII with his son. He claimed to have tried to contact Jenny beforehand, but was unable to do so. The disclosure of the trespassing complaint prompted the National Republican Congressional Committee to pull all support from his congressional campaign.

=== Andy McKay ===
Sanford married Andy McKay, an investment banker from Louisville, Kentucky, in 2018.

Honorary titles
Preceded by Rachel Hodges	First Lady of South Carolina; 2003–2010	Succeeded by Michael Haley as First Gentleman of South Carolina
