= Can't Is Not an Option =

Autobiography by Nikki Haley

Can't Is Not an Option: My American Story
- Language: English
- Subject: Nikki Haley
- Genre: Non-fiction
- Published: 2012
- Publisher: Sentinel
- Publication place: United States

Can't Is Not an Option: My American Story is an autobiography by former Governor of South Carolina and United States Ambassador to the United Nations, Nikki Haley, published by Sentinel in 2012.

According to The Economist, which compares Haley to another shopkeeper's daughter, British Prime Minister Margaret Thatcher, the most important passage is Haley's recounting of how she kept the books in her mother’s dress shop, Exotica International starting at age 12. This, according to The Economist, imbued her with "an extreme watchfulness about overheads and a sharp aversion to government intrusion."

The title is taken from a phrase Haley recalls as part of her childhood. When something appeared difficult, her parents would tell her and her siblings that "Can't is not an option."

== Reception ==
A review in The Hindu criticized the book on the grounds that Haley, the daughter of immigrants from India, stressed her American-ness at the cost of "distanc(ing) herself from what makes her interesting. Her gender, her ethnicity, her religion(s), and even original thought have all been pushed out of focus, only to be touched upon to prove a point about how American she is."

The Washington Times reviewer called the story of the daughter of two Sikh immigrants from the Punjab "inspiring," quoting Haley's account of her parents leaving behind “a culture and a political system that judges people by the family or the caste or religion they come from” to come to America and “stand before the law and before government as individuals, not as members of a group … They might succeed and they might fail. But they wouldn’t have the game rigged against them because of who they were.”
