= Nikki Haley =

American politician and diplomat (born 1972)

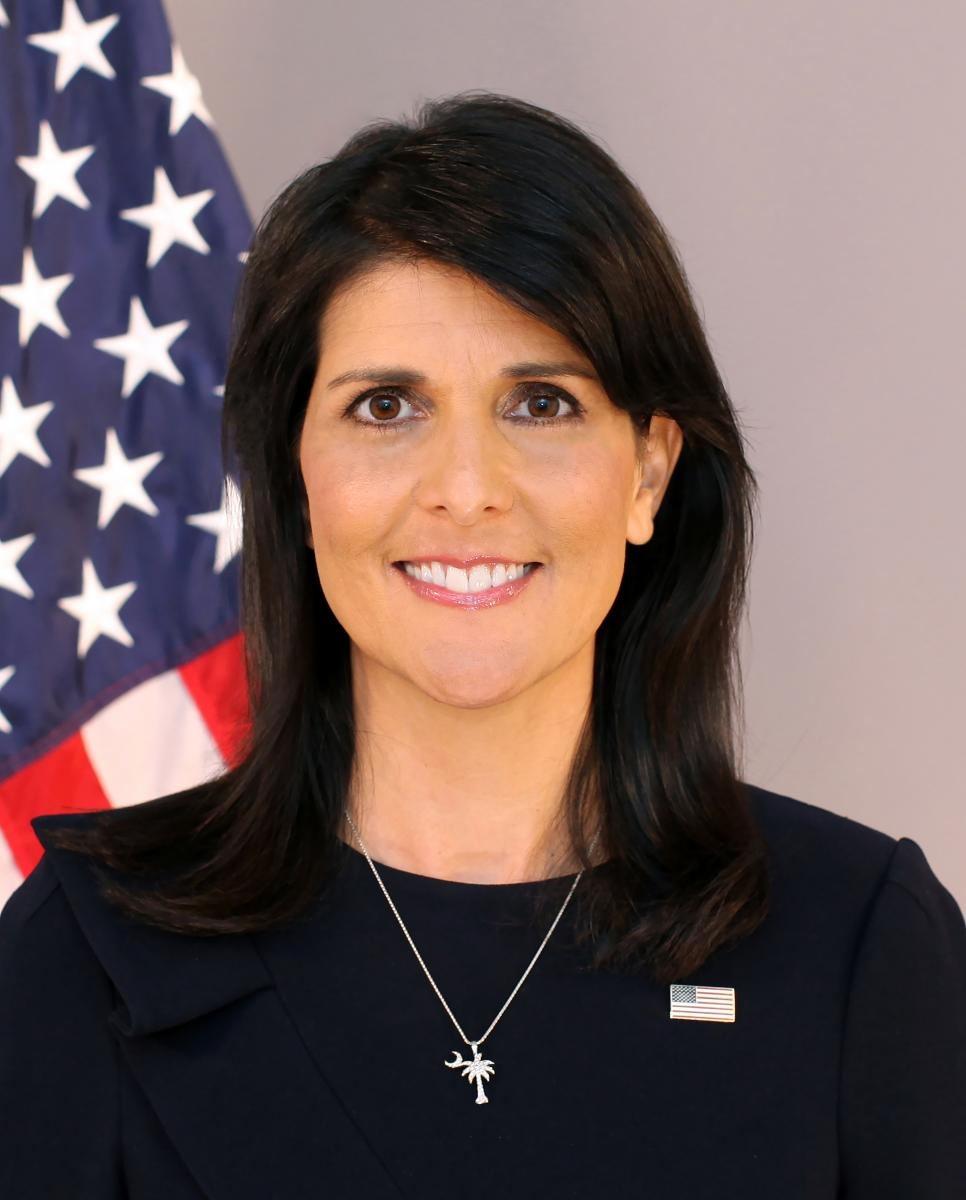
- Official portrait, 2017

29th United States Ambassador to the United Nations
- In office January 27, 2017 – December 31, 2018
- President: Donald Trump
- Deputy: Michele J. Sison; Kelley Eckels Currie (acting); Jonathan Cohen
- Preceded by: Samantha Power
- Succeeded by: Kelly Craft

116th Governor of South Carolina
- In office January 12, 2011 – January 24, 2017
- Lieutenant: Ken Ard; Glenn F. McConnell; Yancey McGill; Henry McMaster
- Preceded by: Mark Sanford
- Succeeded by: Henry McMaster

Member of the South Carolina House of Representatives from the 87th district
- In office January 11, 2005 – January 11, 2011
- Preceded by: Larry Koon
- Succeeded by: Todd Atwater

Personal details
- Born: Nimarata Nikki Randhawa; January 20, 1972 (age 54) Bamberg, South Carolina, U.S.
- Party: Republican
- Spouse: Michael Haley (m. 1996)
- Children: 2, including Nalin
- Education: Clemson University (BS)
- Haley's voice Haley responding to gas attacks in Syria. Recorded April 5, 2017

Nimarata Nikki Haley (née Randhawa; born January 20, 1972) is an American politician and diplomat who served as the 116th governor of South Carolina from 2011 to 2017 and as the 29th U.S. ambassador to the United Nations from 2017 to 2018. A Republican, Haley is the first Indian American to serve in a presidential cabinet. She came in second in the 2024 Republican Party presidential primaries after Donald Trump.

Haley joined her family's clothing business before serving as treasurer and then president of the National Association of Women Business Owners. She was elected to the South Carolina House of Representatives in 2004 and served three terms. She was elected governor of South Carolina in 2010, making her the first female Asian-American governor of any state, as well as the state's first female governor and the second U.S. governor of Indian descent, after Bobby Jindal of Louisiana. During her time as governor, she received national attention for leading the state's response to the 2015 Charleston church shooting.

In January 2017, Haley became the U.S. ambassador to the United Nations in the administration of Donald Trump. As U.N. ambassador, Haley was notable for her advocacy for Israel, her defense of the Trump administration's withdrawal of the U.S. from the Iran nuclear deal and the Paris climate agreement, and her withdrawal of the U.S. from the United Nations Human Rights Council. She stepped down as ambassador on December 31, 2018.

Haley announced her campaign for President of the United States in February 2023. After the Iowa caucuses, Haley and Trump became the only remaining major candidates in the Republican primaries. She campaigned directly against Trump for almost two months. She became the first female Republican presidential candidate to win a presidential primary, and the second woman of color to win a major party nominating contest, after Shirley Chisholm in 1972, with her victory in the Washington DC primary. After losing in all of the Super Tuesday contests, with the exception of Vermont, Haley suspended her campaign on March 6, 2024, and subsequently endorsed Trump. On April 15, 2024, the Hudson Institute announced Haley would join the think tank as the next Walter P. Stern Chair.

== Early life ==
Haley's 1989 high school yearbook portrait

Haley was born as Nimarata Nikki Randhawa at Bamberg County Memorial Hospital in Bamberg, South Carolina, to immigrant Punjabi Jat Sikh parents from Amritsar, Punjab, India. Before moving to North America, her father, Ajit Singh Randhawa (1933–2024), was a professor at Punjab Agricultural University, and her mother, Raj Kaur Randhawa (1936–2025), received her law degree from the University of Delhi. They had an arranged marriage and moved in 1964 when Ajit accepted a PhD program scholarship from the University of British Columbia. After Ajit graduated in 1969, he began as a professor at Voorhees College, a historically black institution, and the family settled in South Carolina. Raj earned a master's degree in education and taught social studies in the Bamberg Public Schools for seven years. She founded a successful women's boutique, Exotica International, where she began to work full time. Nikki began assisting with bookkeeping when she was 12. The business expanded to menswear in 1993, with The Gentlemen's Quarters, and both stores remained open until Raj retired in 2008.

Haley has two brothers and a sister. She attended Orangeburg Preparatory Schools, graduating in 1989. She graduated from Clemson University in 1994 with a B.S. degree in accounting and finance. Haley has been known by her middle name, Nikki, a Punjabi name meaning "little one", since she was born.

== Early career ==
After graduating from college, Haley worked for FCR Corporation, a waste management and recycling company, before joining her family's clothing business as its bookkeeper and chief financial officer. After she married Michael Haley in 1996, she became active in civic affairs. In 1998, she was named to the board of directors of the Orangeburg County Chamber of Commerce. She was named to the board of directors of the Lexington Chamber of Commerce in 2003. Haley became treasurer of the National Association of Women Business Owners in 2003, and president in 2004.

Haley chaired the Lexington Gala to raise funds for a local hospital. She also served on the Lexington Medical Foundation, Lexington County Sheriff's Foundation, and West Metro Republican Women. She was the president of the South Carolina Chapter of the National Association of Women Business Owners, and was chair for the 2006 Friends of Scouting Leadership Division campaign.

== South Carolina House of Representatives (2005–2011) ==
=== Campaigns ===
In 2004, Haley ran for the South Carolina House of Representatives to represent District 87 in Lexington County. She ran in the Republican primary on a platform of education reform and property tax relief. Initially, she ran because she believed that incumbent Republican state representative Larry Koon, who was the longest-serving legislator in the South Carolina Statehouse at the time, was not going to seek reelection, but Koon entered the race just before the filing deadline.

In the primary election, Koon received 42 percent of the vote, Haley received 40 percent, and David Perry received 17 percent. As no candidate received a majority of the vote (50 percent or higher), Haley and Koon advanced to a runoff election on June 22. In the runoff, she defeated Koon 55 percent to 45 percent. After his loss, Koon accused Haley of running a smear campaign, which she denied. She ran unopposed in the general election.

Haley became the first Indian-American to hold office in South Carolina. She was unopposed for re-election to a second term in 2006. In 2008, she won re-election with 83 percent of the vote, defeating Democrat Edgar Gomez, who garnered only 17 percent.

=== Legislative tenure and policies ===
Haley was elected chair of the freshman caucus in 2005 and majority whip in the South Carolina General Assembly. She was the only freshman legislator who had been named to be a whip at the time.

One of Haley's stated goals was to lower taxes. She voted against a proposed cigarette surtax three times. She voted for a bill that raised sales taxes from five cents per dollar to six cents per dollar, exempted sales tax on unprepared food such as canned goods, and exempted property tax on "owner-occupied residential property" except for the taxes due from what is still owed on the property. Haley was named a "Taxpayer Hero" by Governor Mark Sanford in 2005 and a "Friend of the Taxpayer" by the South Carolina Association of Taxpayers in 2009.

Haley implemented a plan in which teachers' salaries would be based on not only seniority and qualifications but also job performance, as determined by evaluations and reports from principals, students, and parents. She supports school choice and charter schools. Haley also supports barring legislators from collecting legislative pensions while in office. She believes such pensions should be based on only the $10,400 legislative salary instead of the salary plus lawmakers' $12,000 annual expense allowance.

Haley has stated that, as a daughter of immigrants, she believes the immigration laws should be enforced. She voted in favor of a law that requires employers to be able to prove that newly hired employees are legal residents of the United States, and also requires all immigrants to carry documentation at all times proving that they are legally in the United States.

Haley describes herself as pro-life and has supported legislation to restrict abortion. She has stated "I'm not pro-life because the Republican Party tells me. I'm pro-life because all of us have had experiences of what it means to have one of these special little ones in our life." In 2009, she co-sponsored a bill that would mandate a 24-hour waiting period for women seeking abortions after an ultrasound, also known as the "reflecting" period. The bill passed both legislative chambers in 2010 and was signed into law by Governor Sanford later that year.

In 2016, as governor, Haley re-signed a new state law that bans abortions at 20 weeks of pregnancy. She has voted in favor of some abortion-related bills that were tabled or rejected, including the Inclusion of Unborn Child/Fetus in Definition for Civil Suits Amendment, Prohibiting Employment Termination Due to Abortion Waiting Period amendment, and Exempting Cases of Rape from Abortion Waiting Period amendment. The latter would have allowed women not to have to wait 24 hours before having an abortion in some cases.

As a state legislator, Haley served on the Committee on Labor, Commerce and Industry and the Committee on Medical, Military, Public and Municipal Affairs. She had several caucus memberships, including the Freshman Caucus in 2005–06 (chair), the Sportsman's Caucus, and the Women's Caucus in 2007 (vice chair). She also served on the Lexington County Meth Taskforce.

== Governor of South Carolina (2011–2017) ==
=== 2010 gubernatorial election ===
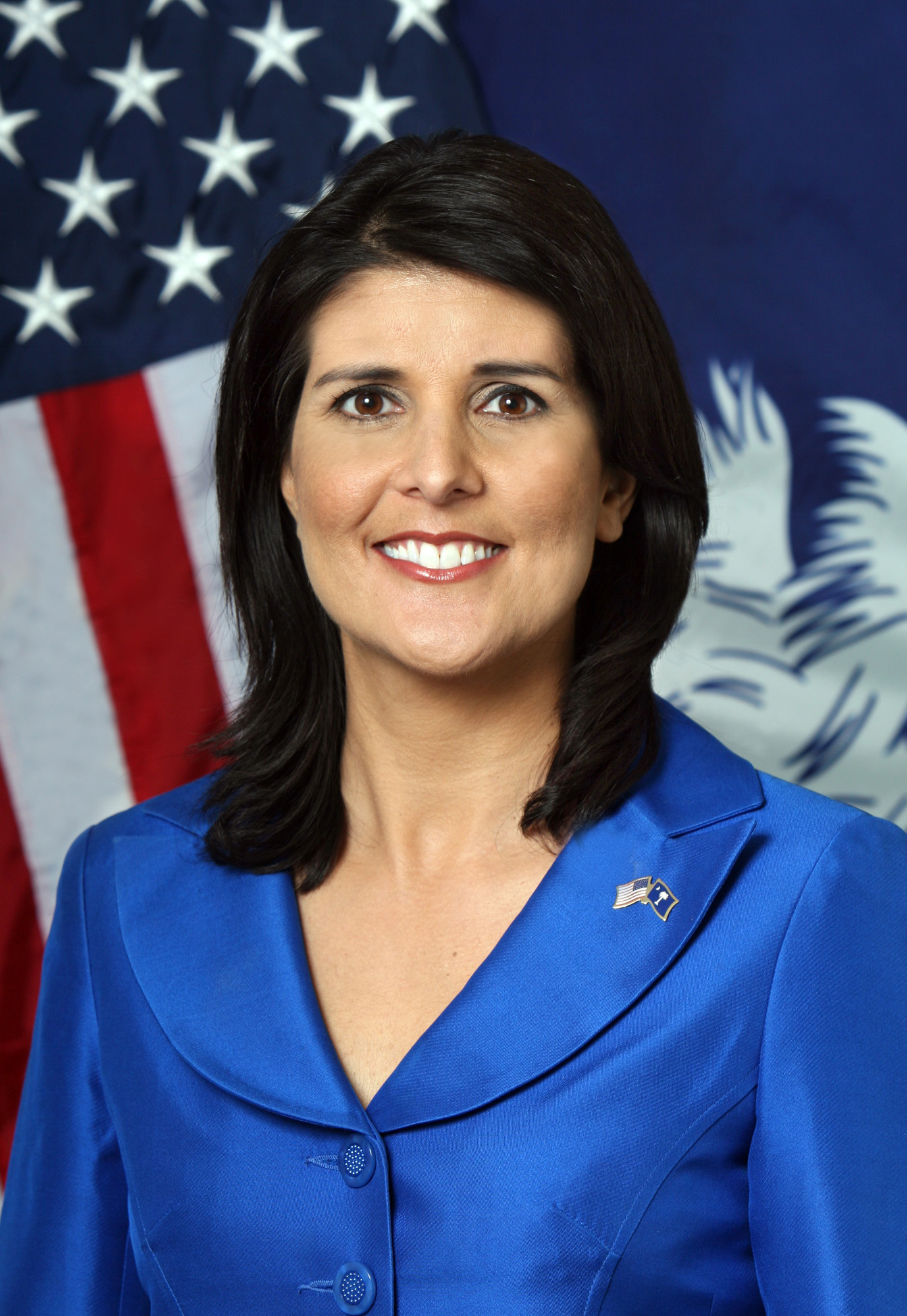
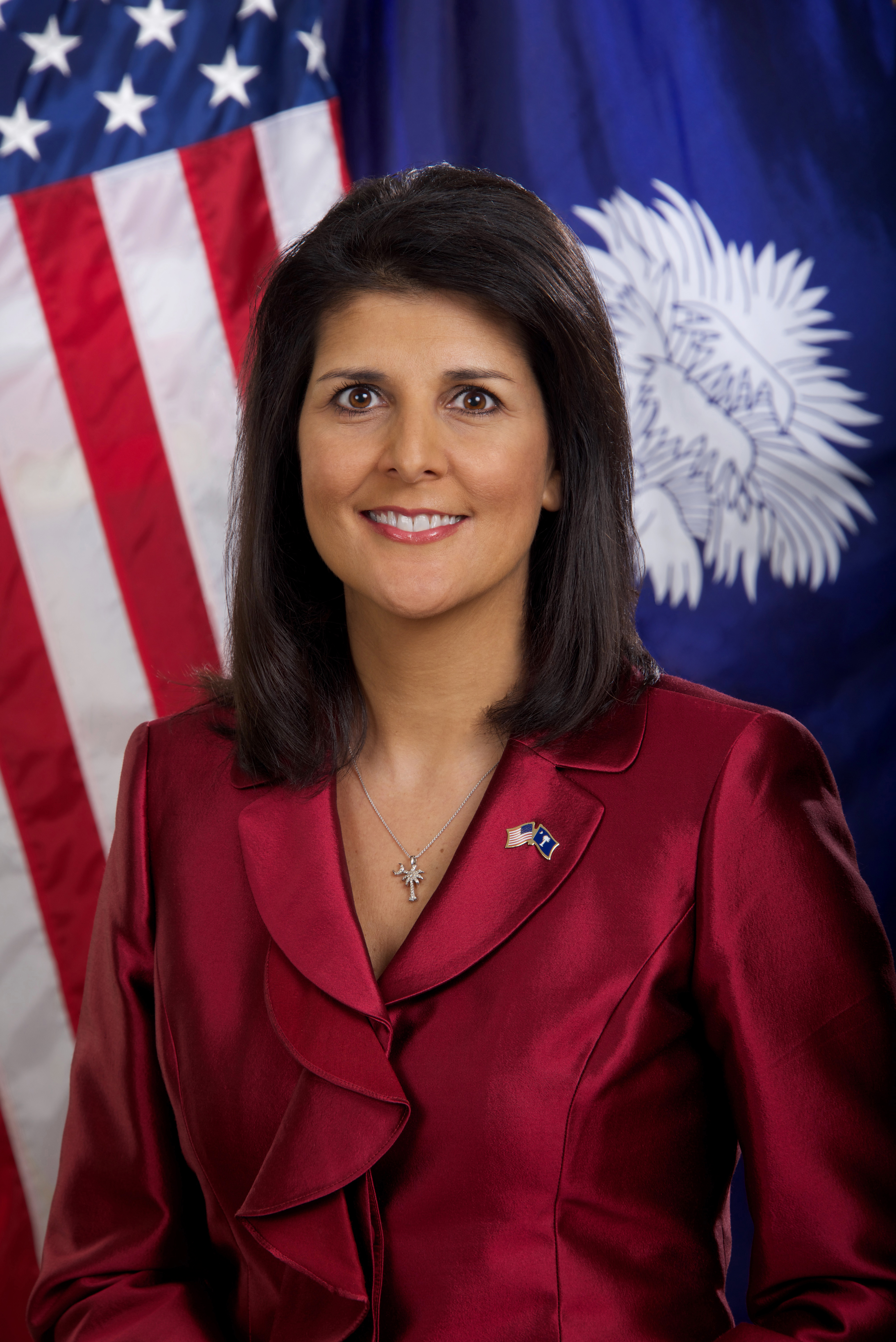
Haley's gubernatorial portraits during her first (left) and second (right) term

On May 14, 2009, Haley announced that she would run for the Republican nomination for governor of South Carolina in the 2010 election. Haley had been persuaded to run by incumbent governor and fellow Republican Mark Sanford. She was endorsed by former Massachusetts Governor Mitt Romney, as well as Jenny Sanford, the first lady of South Carolina. Haley also received the endorsement of former Alaska Governor Sarah Palin three weeks before the primary. When she received Palin's endorsement, Haley was trailing three other candidates in the polls.

The Republican gubernatorial primary took place on June 8, 2010, and Haley received 49% of the vote, forcing a runoff election on June 22. Haley won the runoff vote 65 to 35 percent. According to ABC News, "pundits credited the notable endorsements of tea party groups, former state first lady Jenny Sanford, and former Alaska Gov. Sarah Palin with legitimizing her candidacy in the face of the state's male-dominated political establishment".

Haley was elected governor on November 2, 2010, defeating Democratic candidate Vincent Sheheen, 51% to 47%. Due to her election, Haley became the first female Asian-American governor in the U.S., as well as the third non-white American to be elected governor of a Southern state (the first two such governors were Virginia's Douglas Wilder and Louisiana's Bobby Jindal).

=== 2014 reelection ===
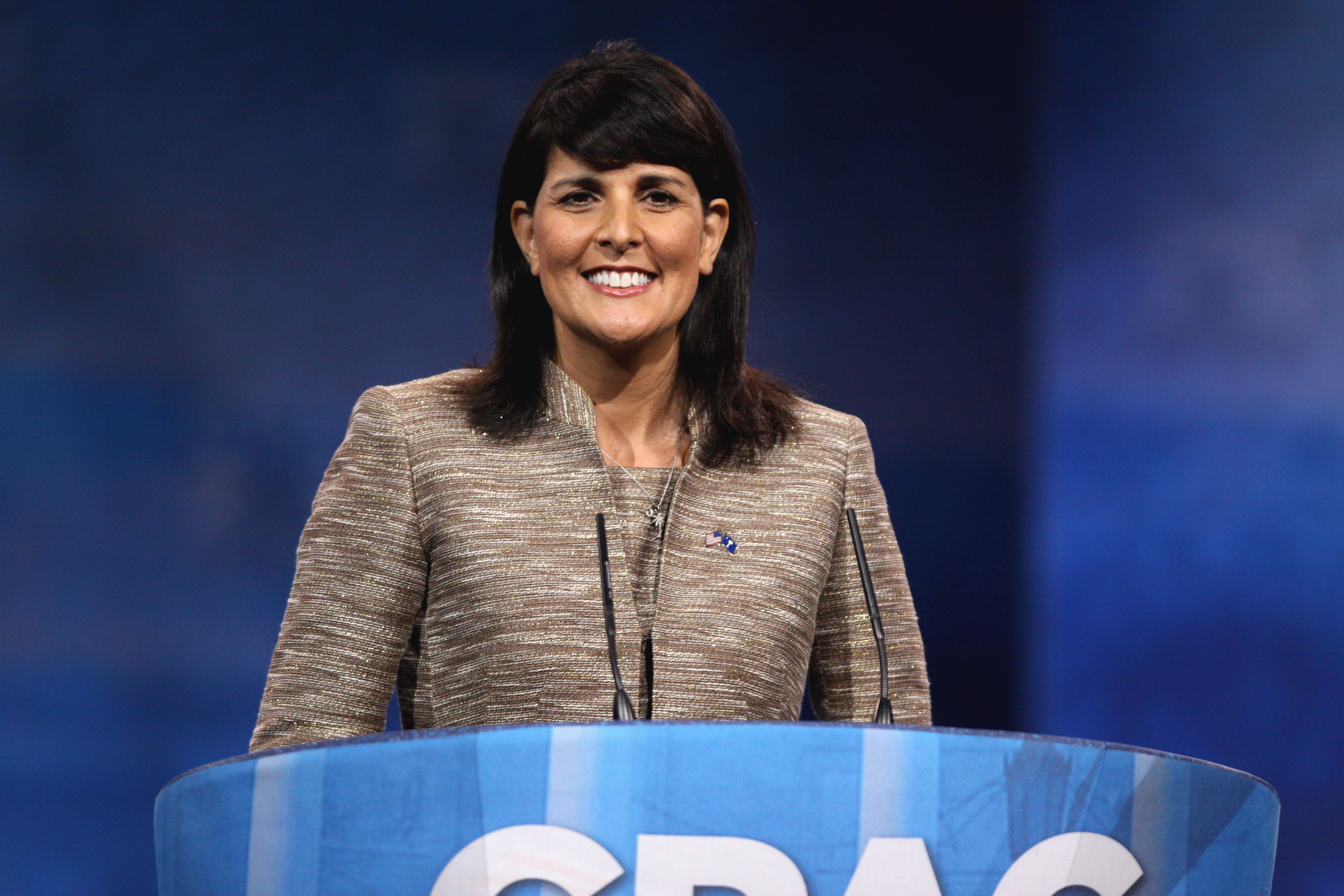
Haley speaking at the Conservative Political Action Conference in National Harbor, Maryland, March 2013

On August 12, 2013, Haley announced she would seek a second term as governor. She faced a challenge in the Republican primary from Tom Ervin, who later withdrew and reentered the race as an independent. As in 2010, Vincent Sheheen of the Democratic Party ran against Haley. Libertarian Steve French and United Citizens Party candidate Morgan Bruce Reeves also ran. The five candidates debated twice. A week after the second debate, Ervin withdrew from the race and endorsed Sheheen.

Haley was reelected on November 4, 2014, defeating Sheheen, 55.9% to 41.3%.

=== Tenure ===
Haley took office as governor in January 2011. In 2012, former governor Mitt Romney considered her for his vice-presidential running mate. Haley said that she would turn down any potential vice presidential offer.

In June 2011, Haley signed an "Arizona-style" immigration law. Much of the act was blocked by the federal courts, which found several key provisions to be unconstitutional.

During her second term, Haley feuded with veteran lawmakers in the General Assembly. She endorsed powerful senate finance chairman Hugh Leatherman's primary opponent in 2016. After winning the primary, Leatherman stated that Haley was not just a lame duck, but a "dead duck". Her second term as governor was set to expire on January 9, 2019; however, Haley resigned her position on January 24, 2017, to serve as U.S. ambassador to the United Nations.

Haley delivered the official Republican response to President Barack Obama's 2016 State of the Union Address on January 12, 2016.

In 2016, Haley was named by Time magazine as one of the 100 most influential people in the world.

Haley was mentioned in January 2016 as a potential candidate for vice presidency in the 2016 presidential election. On May 4, 2016, after Trump became the presumptive presidential nominee, Haley said she had no interest in the vice presidential nomination.

Four lieutenant governors served under Haley. Haley, a Republican, welcomed Yancey McGill, a Democrat, to serve as her lieutenant governor after Glenn F. McConnell's resignation. Haley was initially against having a Democrat serve as the second-in-command to the governor, but she, along with the Senate, eventually acquiesced.

On December 17, 2012, Haley announced she would appoint Tim Scott to fill the vacancy created by the resignation of Senator Jim DeMint, who previously announced that he would retire from the Senate to become the president of the Heritage Foundation. Following his appointment, Scott became the first African American U.S. senator from South Carolina.

Haley chose Scott over others on her short list, including Representative Trey Gowdy, former South Carolina attorney general Henry McMaster, former First Lady of South Carolina Jenny Sanford, and South Carolina Department of Health and Environmental Control Director Catherine Templeton.

In July 2013, Haley was fined $3,500 by the State Ethics Commission and given a "public warning" for failing to report the addresses of eight donors during her 2010 campaign for governor.

In August 2013, Haley signed an extradition order for Dusten Brown to be brought to South Carolina in the Adoptive Couple v. Baby Girl case.

=== Gubernatorial policies ===
Upon becoming governor, Haley appointed Bobby Hitt as the state's secretary of commerce. In her State of the State address and other speeches, she touted South Carolina's economic growth and low unemployment rate, and urged businesses to move to the state based on a low cost of doing business, "a loyal, willing workforce," and South Carolina's status as "one of the lowest union-participation states in the country."

Before June 2015, Haley supported flying the Confederate flag on the statehouse grounds. In the immediate aftermath of the Charleston church shooting, Haley did not take a position on removing the flag, saying, "I think the state will start talking about that again, and we'll see where it goes." On June 22, Haley called for the removal of the Confederate flag from the statehouse grounds. She stated:

"These grounds [the State Capital] are a place that everybody should feel a part of. What I realized now more than ever is people were driving by and felt hurt and pain. No one should feel pain." Haley also said, "There is a place for that flag", but she added, "It's not in a place that represents all people in South Carolina."

In July 2015, Haley signed a bill to authorize removing the Confederate flag from the flagpole on the grounds of the South Carolina Capitol. In December 2019, she defended the people of South Carolina, saying that "some people" in South Carolina saw the flag as a representation of "service and sacrifice and heritage" before the flag was hijacked by the white supremacist mass killer Dylann Roof. In regard to the state trial of Roof, Haley urged prosecutors to seek the death penalty against him.

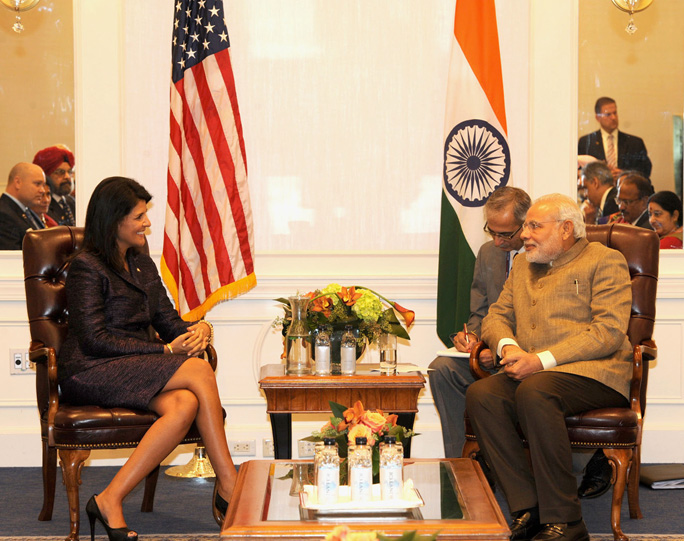
Haley and Indian prime minister Narendra Modi in New York on September 28, 2014

In April 2016, Haley indicated she would not support an anti-trans "bathroom bill" introduced by the South Carolina State Senate that would require transgender individuals to use restrooms based on their gender assigned at birth. Haley said that the legislation was unnecessary and would not solve any identifiable problem in the state.

In 2021, Haley spoke against Executive Order 13988, officially titled Preventing and Combating Discrimination on the Basis of Gender Identity or Sexual Orientation.

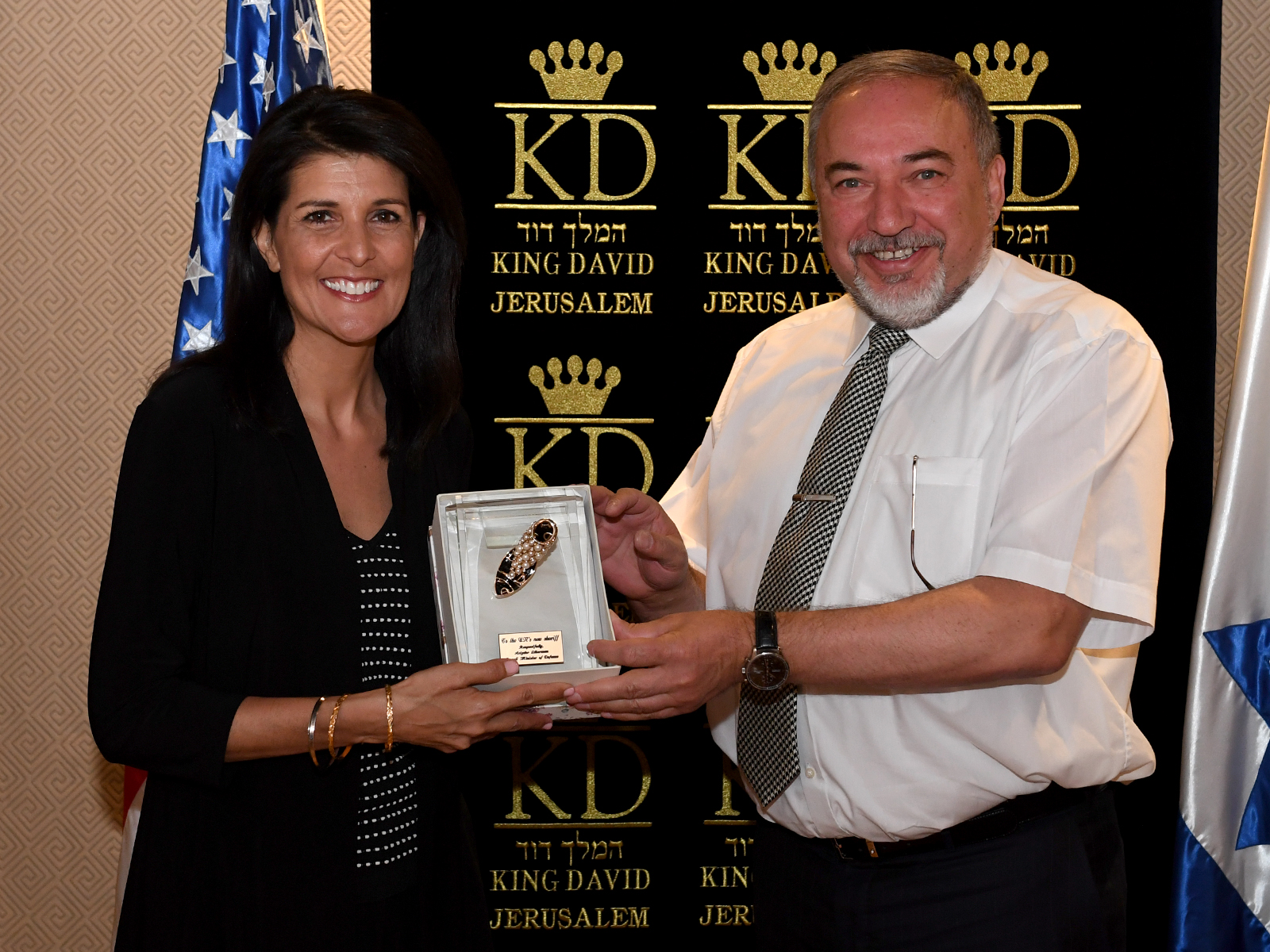
Haley with Israeli defense minister Avigdor Lieberman in 2017

Haley has been described by South Carolina senator Lindsey Graham as a "strong supporter of the State of Israel." As governor, she signed an anti-BDS law to stop efforts of the Boycott, Divestment and Sanctions (BDS) movement. This legislation was the first of its kind on a statewide level. Haley also stated that "nowhere has the UN's failure been more consistent and more outrageous than in its bias against our close ally Israel."

Haley supports voter photo ID laws.

=== Veto record ===
During her 2011–2017 gubernatorial term, Haley vetoed 50 bills, 24 (48%) of which were overridden by the state legislature.

== United States ambassador to the United Nations (2017–2018) ==
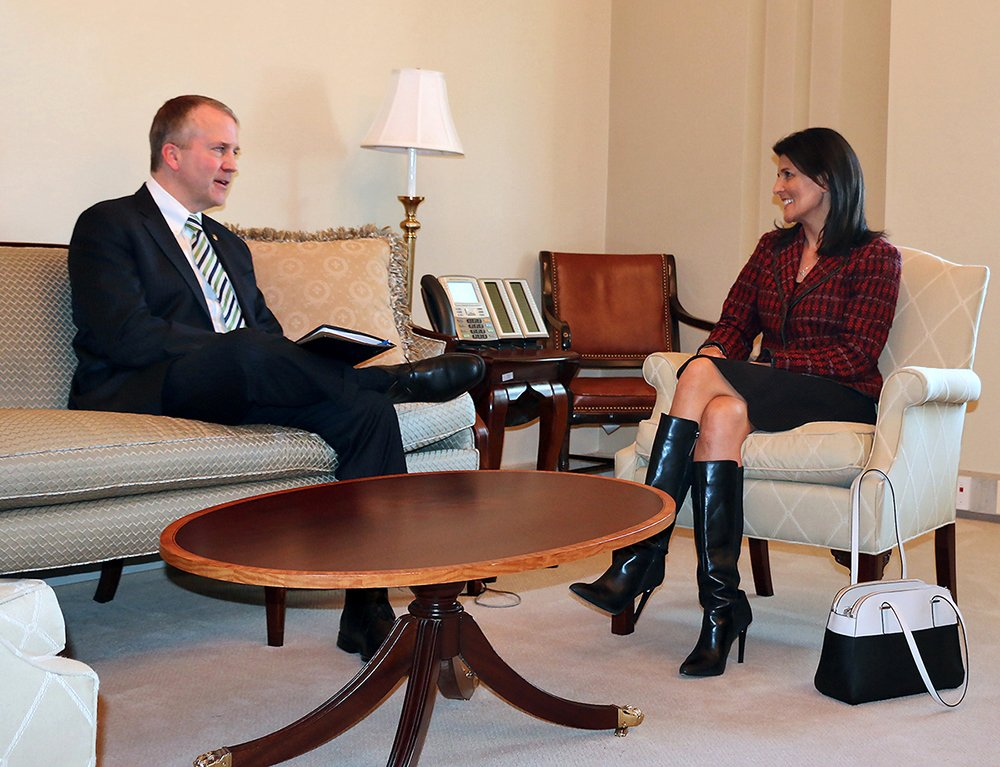
Haley meeting with Sen. Dan Sullivan shortly after her nomination to become US ambassador to the United Nations

=== Nomination and confirmation ===
On November 23, 2016, then President-elect Donald Trump announced his intention to nominate Haley for ambassador to the United Nations. Upon taking office on January 20, 2017, Trump sent Haley's nomination to the United States Senate. She was confirmed two days later on a 96–4 vote; the four senators who voted against Haley were independent Bernie Sanders (Vermont) and Democrats Martin Heinrich (New Mexico), Tom Udall (New Mexico), and Chris Coons (Delaware).

Trump reportedly considered Haley for the position of secretary of state, which she declined. Haley was the first Indian American to hold a Cabinet-level position. Immediately following her confirmation by the U.S. Senate, Haley resigned as South Carolina governor, and Lt. Governor Henry McMaster became governor.

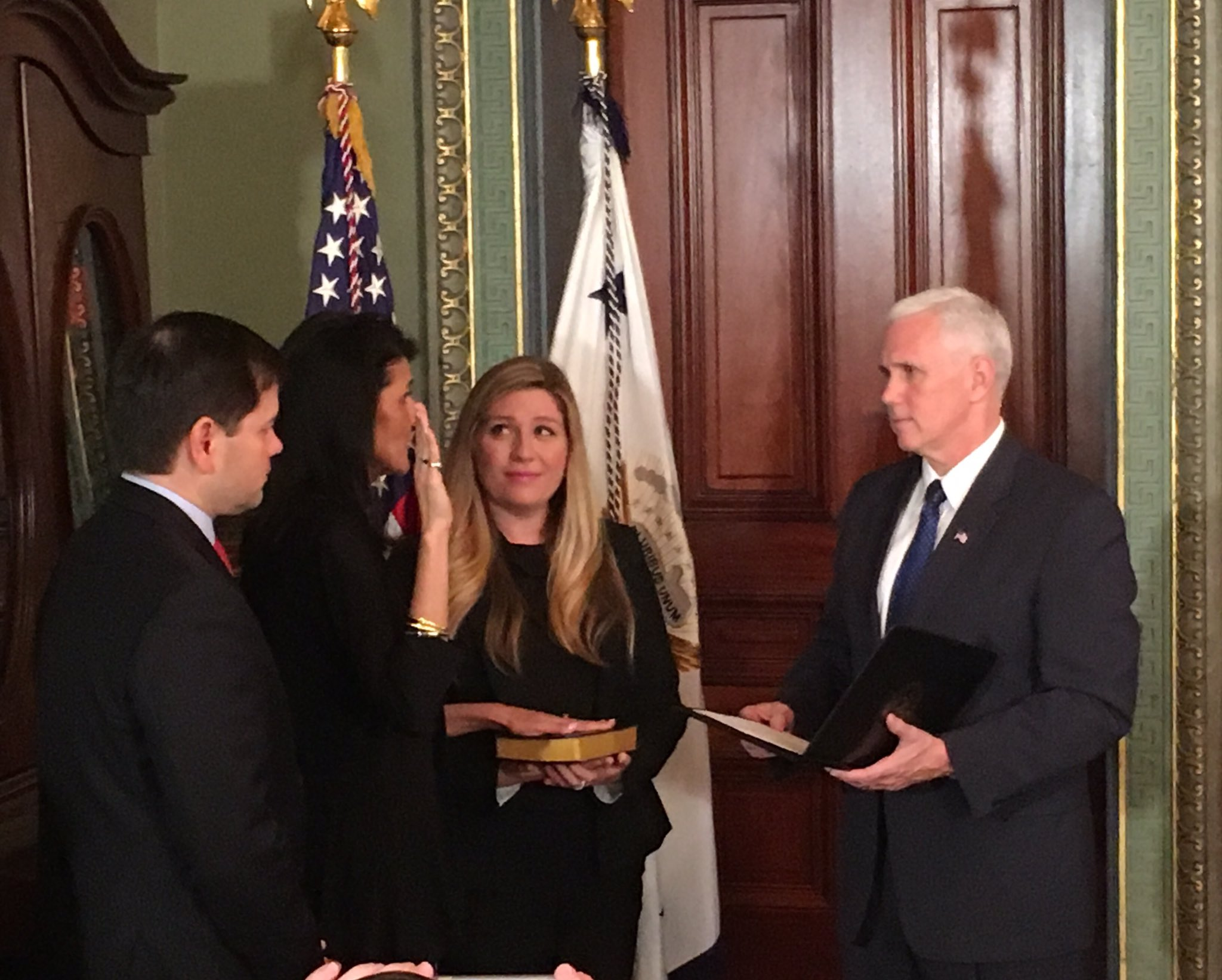
Haley sworn in by Vice President Mike Pence on January 25, 2017, Senator Marco Rubio standing to the side

Haley was sworn in by Vice President Mike Pence on January 25, 2017. She met with United Nations secretary-general António Guterres on January 27, 2017, at the UN Headquarters in New York City. She replaced Ambassador Samantha Power.

=== Tenure ===
Defining aspects of Haley's tenure as U.S. ambassador include her consistently strong advocacy for Israel, her defense of the Trump administration's 2018 withdrawal of the U.S. from the Iran nuclear deal, and her withdrawal of the U.S. from the United Nations Human Rights Council, a move reversed under the Biden administration, when the U.S. rejoined the council.

She defended the Trump administration's decision to withdraw the U.S. from the Paris climate agreement, a move later reversed, as the Biden administration reentered the agreement. As ambassador, Haley sometimes took positions at odds from the Trump White House; she announced that the U.S. would impose new sanctions on Russia and on the Bashar al-Assad regime in Syria, but new sanctions were blocked by the White House.

==== Russia and Syria ====
In 2017, Haley declared to the U.N. Security Council that sanctions against Russia for its Crimean conflict would not be lifted until Russia returned control over the region to Ukraine. Later that year, Haley said the U.S. would retain "strong and tough" sanctions against Russia due to its actions in Ukraine.

On March 30, 2017, Haley stated that the U.S. would no longer focus on forcing Syrian president Bashar al-Assad to leave power. This was a policy shift from former president Barack Obama's initial stance on Assad. On April 5, speaking to the U.N. Security Council a day after the Khan Shaykhun chemical attack, Haley said Russia, Assad, and Iran "have no interest in peace" and attacks similar to this would continue occurring should nothing be done in response. A day later, the U.S. launched 59 Tomahawk cruise missiles toward the Shayrat Air Base in Syria. Haley called the strike a "very measured step" and warned that the U.S. was prepared "to do more" despite wishing it would not be required.

On April 12, after Russia blocked a draft resolution meant to condemn the Khan Shaykhun chemical attack, Haley criticized Russia, saying, "We need to see Russia choose to side with the civilized world over an Assad government that brutally terrorizes its own people." On June 28, while appearing before the United States House Committee on Foreign Affairs, Haley credited Trump's warning to Syria with stopping another chemical attack: "I can tell you due to the president's actions, we did not see an incident."

In April 2017, Haley spoke out against Ramzan Kadyrov amid the murders and persecution of gay men in Chechnya, which is part of the Russian Federation. She said: "We continue to be disturbed by reports of kidnapping, torture, and murder of people in Chechnya based on their sexual orientation...this violation of human rights cannot be ignored."

==== Iran ====
In April 2017, while holding her first session as president of the UN Security Council, Haley charged Iran and Hezbollah with having "conducted terrorist acts" for decades within the Middle East.

In September 2017, Haley stated that "some countries", a reference to Russia, although Haley did not refer to Russia by name, were shielding Iran by blocking the International Atomic Energy Agency from verifying Iranian compliance with the international nuclear agreement with Iran. Haley said that it "appears that some countries are attempting to shield Iran from even more inspections. Without inspections, the Iran deal is an empty promise."

Also in December 2017, Haley accused Iran of backing the Houthi rebels in the Yemeni Civil War, in which the Houthis were fighting the Saudi-backed Hadi government. She said that the "fight against Iranian aggression is the world's fight." Iranian officials denied the accusations, saying that they "seek also to cover up for the Saudi war crimes in Yemen, with the US complicity, and divert attention from the stalemate war of aggression against the Yemenis." Iran likened Haley's presentation to that of then-Secretary of State Colin Powell, before the 2003 invasion of Iraq. Haley also said that "It's hard to find a conflict or terrorist group in the Middle East that doesn't have Iran's fingerprints all over it."

==== Comments on proposed Muslim ban ====
On March 15, 2017, Haley said she would not support a ban on Muslim immigration to the U.S. should President Trump choose to enact one, but argued that Trump's proposal was not a Muslim ban. She insisted she would "never support a Muslim ban", saying "It would be un-American" and "I don't think we should ever ban anyone based on their religion". Haley affirmed this stance by claiming Trump said, "Let's temporarily pause, and you prove to me that the vetting is okay, that I can trust these people coming through for the American people."

==== North Korea ====
Haley said the U.S. military could be deployed in response to any further North Korean missile tests or usage of nuclear missiles and that she believed Kim Jong-un understood this due to pressure by both the U.S. and China. On May 14, 2017, after North Korea performed a ballistic missile test, Haley said Kim was "in a state of paranoia" after feeling pressure from the U.S. On June 2, 2017, after the U.N. Security Council approved a resolution adding fifteen North Koreans and four entities linked to North Korea's nuclear and missile programs to a sanctions blacklist, Haley said the council's vote was "sending a clear message to North Korea today: Stop firing ballistic missiles or face the consequences"

On July 5, 2017, during a U.N. Security Council meeting, in response to North Korea launching an intercontinental ballistic missile, Haley announced the US would within days "bring before the Security Council a resolution that raises the international response in a way that is proportionate to North Korea's new escalation." The following month the U.N. Security Council unanimously approved sanctions on North Korea banning exports worth over $1 billion. Haley said that the sanctions package was "the single largest ... ever leveled against the North Korean regime."

==== Israel–Palestine ====
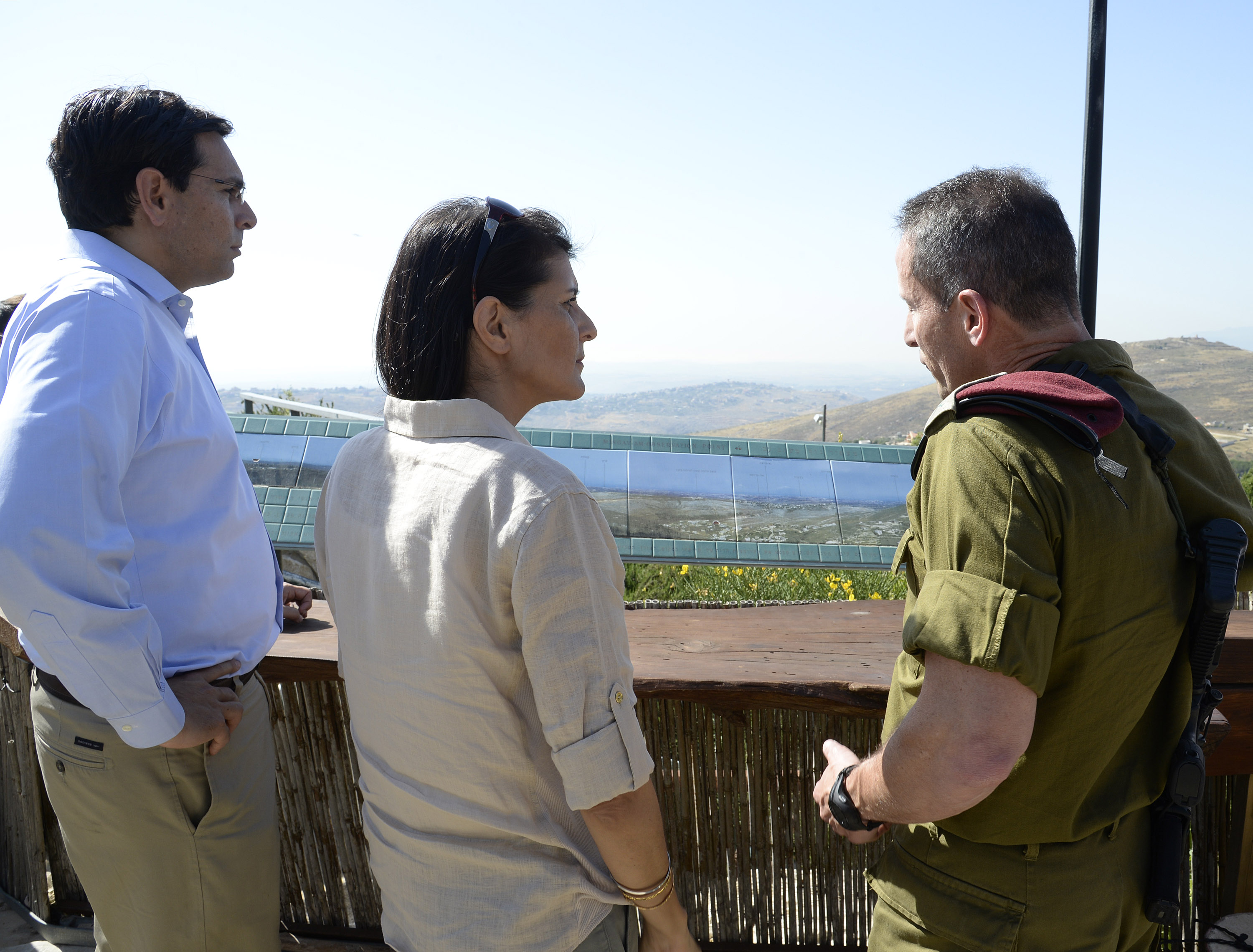
Haley in the Golan Heights

In a May 2017 interview, Haley expressed interest in moving the U.S. embassy to Israel from Tel Aviv to Jerusalem. She said the U.N. had "bullied Israel for a very long time" and pledged the US would end this treatment while in Jerusalem. In response to a December 2017 General Assembly Resolution ES-10/19 (an Egyptian-sponsored resolution to void any unilateral decisions on Jerusalem's status and demand that countries "refrain from the establishment of diplomatic missions in the holy city"), Haley warned UN members that she would be "taking names" of countries that voted to reject Trump's decision to recognize Jerusalem as the capital of Israel and move the U.S. embassy there, writing, "As you consider your vote, I encourage you to know the president and the US take this vote personally. The president will be watching this vote carefully and has requested I report back on those who voted against us."

The resolution passed with 128 in favor, 9 against, and 35 abstaining. Haley traveled to some countries that voted "No," such as Guatemala and Honduras, and thanked them for their support in the emergency special session. The U.S. moved its embassy to Jerusalem in 2018. In her later memoirs, Haley said that a faction within the Trump administration, led by Secretary of State Rex Tillerson, strongly opposed the decision to move the embassy.

In 2017, Haley blocked the appointment of Salam Fayyad, a Palestinian, as UN envoy to Libya, saying that "The United States does not currently recognize a Palestinian state or support the signal this appointment would send within the United Nations." However, the same year—one day after Trump had suggested he might be open to a one-state solution to the Israel-Palestinian conflict—Haley reaffirmed that U.S. policy was to "absolutely support a two-state solution" to the conflict.

In July 2017, after the UNESCO voted to designate the Hebron's Old City and the Cave of the Patriarchs as Palestinian territory as well as endangered World Heritage Sites, Haley called the choice "tragic on several levels" in a statement (see Israeli–Palestinian conflict in Hebron).

In January 2018, she supported President Trump's withholding humanitarian aid to Palestinians through the U.N. Relief and Works Agency (UNRWA).

==== Rohingya persecution in Myanmar ====
In September 2017, Haley said that her government was "deeply troubled" by reports of atrocities against Rohingya Muslims in Myanmar. Haley criticized Myanmar's civilian leader Aung San Suu Kyi for justifying the imprisonment of the two Reuters journalists (Wa Lone and Kyaw Soe Oo) who reported on the ethnic cleansing and other atrocities perpetrated by the government.

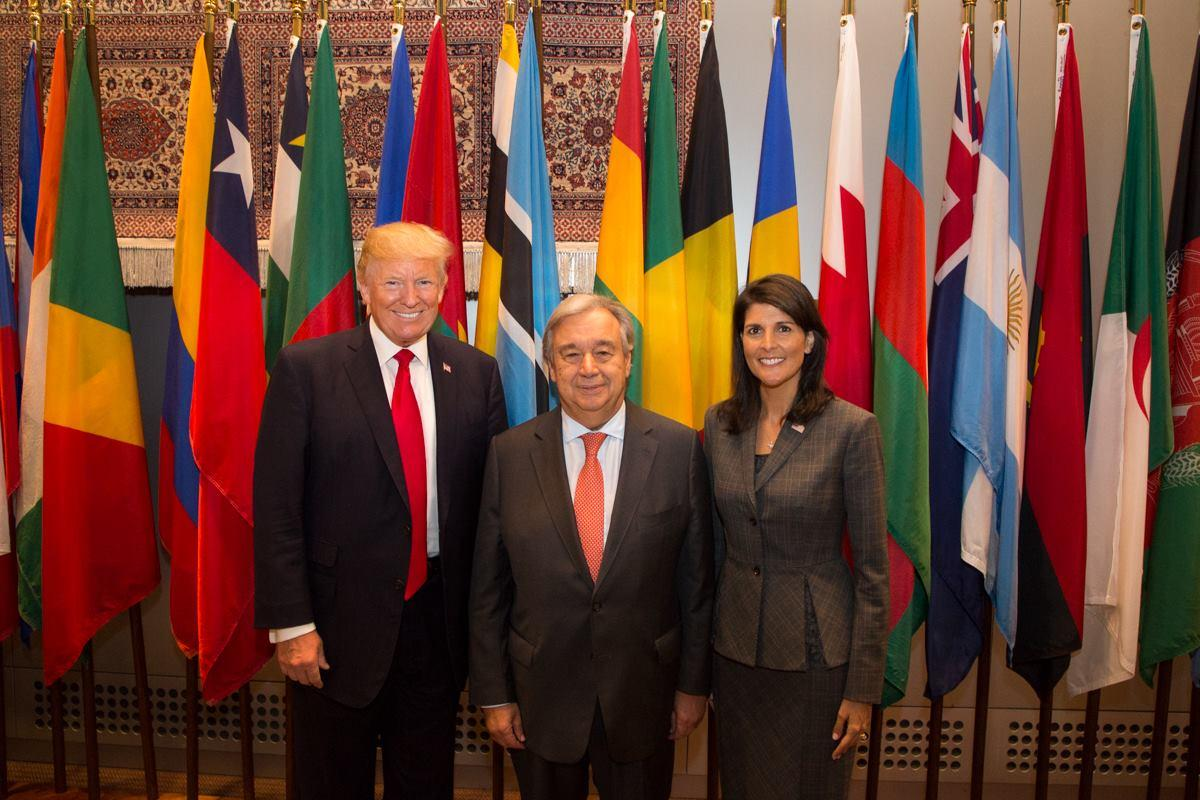
Haley alongside President Donald Trump and United Nations Secretary-General António Guterres, October 2017

==== Hatch Act ====
In October 2017, the federal Office of Special Counsel determined that Haley had violated the federal Hatch Act in June 2017 by retweeting Trump's endorsement of Ralph Norman, a Republican candidate for Congress in South Carolina. Haley deleted the retweet after a complaint was filed by the government watchdog group Citizens for Responsibility and Ethics in Washington. The Office of Special Counsel issued a reprimand by letter but did not recommend any further action be taken against Haley. The special counsel's letter warned Haley that any future violation could be considered "a willful and knowing violation of the law."

==== Capital punishment resolution ====
In October 2017, the U.S., along with 13 other nations, voted against a U.N. Human Rights Council resolution that condemned the use of capital punishment when "applied arbitrarily or in a discriminatory manner" and specifically condemned "the imposition of the death penalty as a sanction for specific forms of conduct, such as apostasy, blasphemy, adultery and consensual same-sex relations." LGBTQ rights advocates in the U.S., including the Human Rights Campaign, were critical of the vote. After the vote, a State Department spokeswoman said that the U.S. voted against the resolution "because of broader concerns with the resolution's approach in condemning the death penalty in all circumstances" and said that the U.S. "unequivocally condemns the application of the death penalty for conduct such as homosexuality, blasphemy, adultery, and apostasy. We do not consider such conduct appropriate for criminalization."

==== Comments on Trump sexual abuse allegations ====
In December 2017, Haley said that the women who had accused President Trump of touching or groping them without their consent "should be heard, and should be dealt with... And I think any woman who has felt violated or felt mistreated in any way, they have every right to speak up." When questioned on whether the accusations were a "settled issue" as a result of the 2016 election, she stated that this was "for the people to decide. I know that he was elected. But, you know, women should always feel comfortable coming forward. And we should all be willing to listen to them."

==== Withdrawal of U.S. from Human Rights Council ====
On June 19, 2018, Haley and U.S. Secretary of State Mike Pompeo announced that the U.S. was pulling out of the United Nations Human Rights Council, accusing the council of being "hypocritical and self-serving"; in the past, Haley had accused it of "chronic anti-Israel bias." "When the Human Rights Council treats Israel worse than North Korea, Iran, and Syria, it is the Council itself that is foolish and unworthy of its name. It is time for the countries who know better to demand changes," Haley said at the time, pointing to the council's adoption of five resolutions condemning Israel.

==== China ====
In October 2018, Haley raised the issue of China's re-education camps and human rights abuses against the Uyghur Muslim minority. She said that "At least a million Uighurs and other Muslim minorities have been imprisoned in so-called 're-education camps' in western China," and detainees are "tortured...forced to renounce their religion and to pledge allegiance to the Communist Party."

=== Relations with Donald Trump ===
During the 2016 Republican presidential primaries, Haley supported and campaigned for U.S. Senator Marco Rubio of Florida. After Rubio dropped out of the election, she supported Ted Cruz.

In June 2016, on the one-year anniversary of the Emanuel AME Church shooting, Haley warned that Trump's rhetoric could lead to violent tragedy. She received extensive press coverage for saying "bless your heart" in response to an attack by Trump. Trump had attacked her on Twitter after she called for him to release his tax records. During the election, she said:

I will not stop until we fight a man that chooses not to disavow the KKK. That is not a part of our party. That's not who we want as president. We will not allow that in our country.

In October 2016, while acknowledging she was "not a fan" of Trump, Haley said she would vote for him and endorsed him as "the best person based on the policies, and dealing with things like Obamacare."

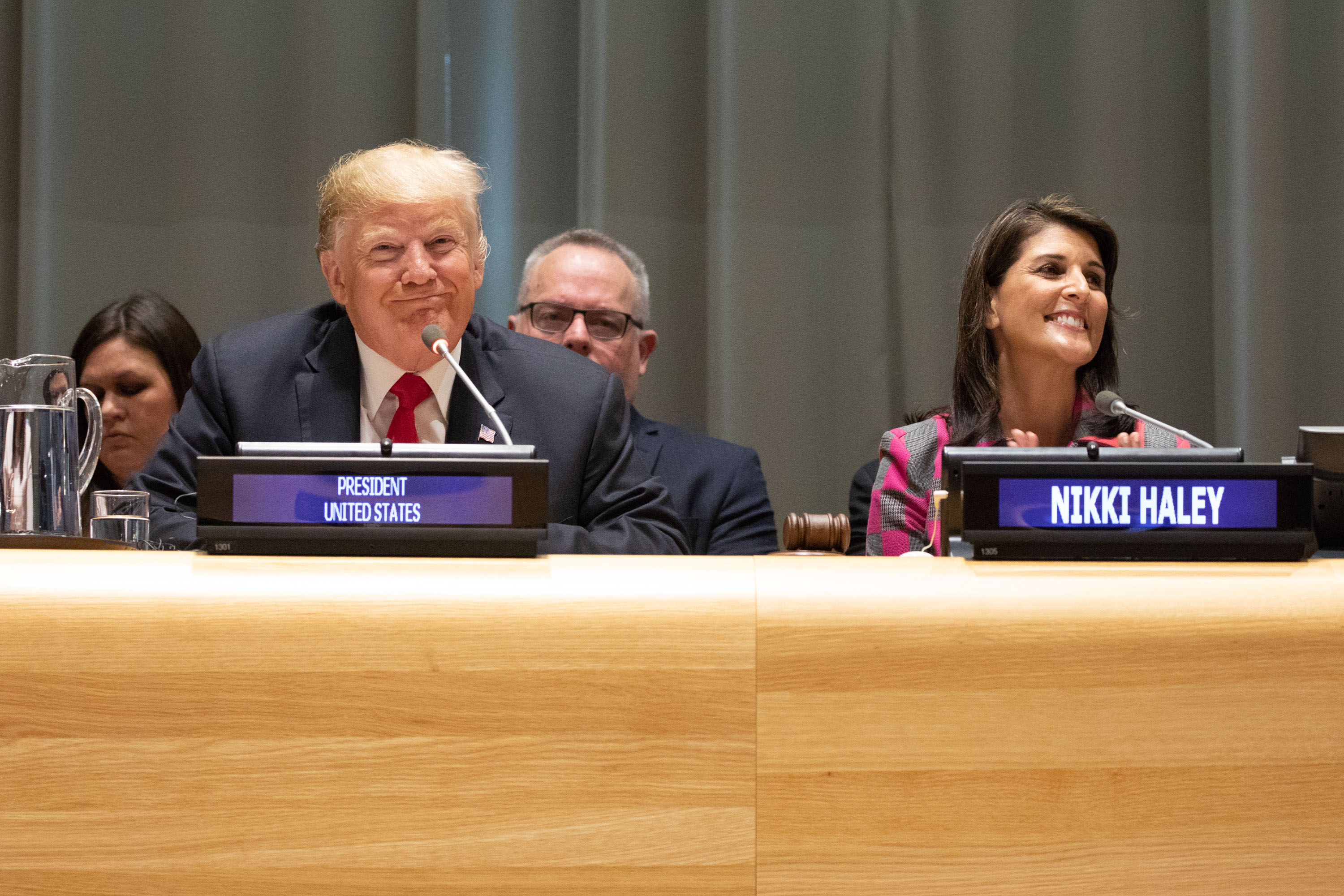
Donald Trump with Haley at the United Nations General Assembly, 2018

After being elected president of the United States in 2016, Donald Trump nominated Haley to the post of U.S. ambassador to the United Nations in January 2017. Following Senate confirmation, Haley was sworn in as U.N. ambassador on January 25, 2017.

After resigning as UN ambassador in December 2018, Haley remained supportive of the Trump administration and called Trump a "friend." She said she was "proud of the successes of the administration" and "I'm not going to apologize" for working with Trump. After Trump's election loss to Joe Biden, she said, "I understand the president. I understand that genuinely, to his core, he believes he was wronged. This is not him making it up."

Haley called Trump's actions around the 2021 storming of the United States Capitol "not his finest," but opposed Trump's second impeachment, criticizing Democrats and journalists on Fox News's The Ingraham Angle with Laura Ingraham. In that January 25 interview, she also said she would vote against impeachment: "They will bring about impeachment, yet they say they are for unity. They beat him up before he got into office. They are beating him up after he leaves office. At some point, give the man a break. I mean, move on."

In an interview on January 12, 2021, published a month later, while Trump's second impeachment trial was underway on charges that he had incited the January 6 attack, Haley said, "We need to acknowledge he let us down. He went down a path he shouldn't have, and we shouldn't have followed him, and we shouldn't have listened to him. And we can't let that ever happen again." According to Politico in February 2021, Haley reached out to Trump to request a meeting at Mar-a-Lago. Trump reportedly declined the request.

In February 2021, when asked whether Trump was a friend, Haley replied, "Friend is a loose term." She has been critical of Trump's role during the 2021 storming of the United States Capitol, saying that she was angry that Trump took no action to protect Vice President Pence, adding, "When I tell you I'm angry, it's an understatement."

In an op-ed published in the Wall Street Journal in February 2021, Haley wrote: "Most of Mr. Trump's major policies were outstanding and made America stronger, safer and more prosperous. Many of his actions since the election were wrong and will be judged harshly by history...I will gladly defend the bulk of the Trump record and his determination to shake up the corrupt status quo in Washington."

Haley repeatedly said that she would support Trump in 2024 if he received the Republican nomination, even if he were to be convicted of criminal charges. She also asserted that Trump cannot win a general election. In a September 2023 appearance on Face the Nation, she said that she would "always" support the Republican presidential nominee but added that Americans "are not going to vote for a convicted criminal." In March 2024, however, Haley hinted that she might not endorse Trump and asserted that she may no longer be bound by her pledge to support the eventual Republican nominee. On May 22, 2024, Haley said she would vote for Trump.

=== Resignation ===
Haley with President Donald Trump in the Oval Office, October 2018

On October 9, 2018, Haley resigned as the U.N. ambassador, effective December 31, 2018. Trump heaped praise on Haley, declaring she was "special to me" at the Oval Office meeting where her resignation was announced, emphasizing that she was not leaving on bad terms. He even raised the possibility she might rejoin the administration later "in a different capacity". Haley portrayed her departure as the act of a conscientious public servant, saying, "I think you have to be selfless enough to know when you step aside and allow someone else to do the job." The news shocked allied diplomats and other senior White House officials. Kelly Craft succeeded Haley in the post.

==== Theories behind the resignation ====
Haley's sudden resignation stunned the political world and multiple theories were floated as potential reasons. A theory many political commentators cited was that her "voice of moderation" was not in line with those of newly appointed Trump cabinet officials such as John Bolton and Mike Pompeo. Haley wielded more influence than Rex Tillerson, then secretary of state, during the first year of the Trump administration, acting almost as a "shadow secretary of state". On this theory, Haley left on her own terms after seeing her influence shrink after Pompeo was appointed secretary of state.

Haley's resignation was announced one day after the anti-corruption watchdog group Citizens for Responsibility and Ethics in Washington (CREW) accused Haley of accepting seven luxury private plane trips as gifts from South Carolina business leaders. CREW was the first to break this story after requesting an Inspector General investigation. Haley listed these seven flights as gifts on a 2018 financial disclosure, claiming they were not ethics violations because they were from personal contacts. A spokesperson for CREW said it has no reason to believe that this was related to her resignation as ambassador, and that this was similar to the activities of other Trump administration officials. Another theory cites her then college-age children, family finances, and intention to take a break, which Haley conveyed to Trump six months before she resigned.

== Post-ambassadorship (2019–2022) ==
In 2019, Haley created a new 501(c)(4) advocacy group, Stand for America. Stand for America did not disclose its donors, but a document subsequently obtained by the press showed that it raised $71 million in 2019 from several billionaires and well-known Republican Party mega-donors, including Paul Singer, Stanley Druckenmiller, Sheldon and Miriam Adelson, and Scott Bessent. Haley's team unsuccessfully demanded that Politico not report on the donor list it had obtained.

In February 2019, Haley was nominated to the board of directors of Boeing, elected at the annual shareholder meeting in April 2019. She had previously fought a unionization effort at Boeing South Carolina plant in North Charleston, where the 787 Dreamliner is produced. She supported a 2009 economic development package, valued at up to $900 million, to incentivize Boeing to relocate the 787 Dreamliner production facility to North Charleston, and, as governor, approved an additional $120 million to Boeing for its expansion. Boeing board members earn at least $315,000 a year as of 2017.

In March 2020, Haley resigned from Boeing's board of directors, saying she disagreed with the company's decision to request federal bailout funds during the COVID-19 pandemic. Following the 2024 grounding of the Boeing 737 Max-9, the Lever reported that Haley, while at Boeing, helped kill an initiative that would have forced the company to "more comprehensively disclose its spending to influence politicians and safety regulators."

In March 2019, Nikki Haley critiqued Senator Bernie Sanders for comparing healthcare costs in Finland and the U.S., saying: "Health care costs are too high. That is true. But comparing us to Finland is ridiculous. Ask them how their health care is. You won't like their answer".

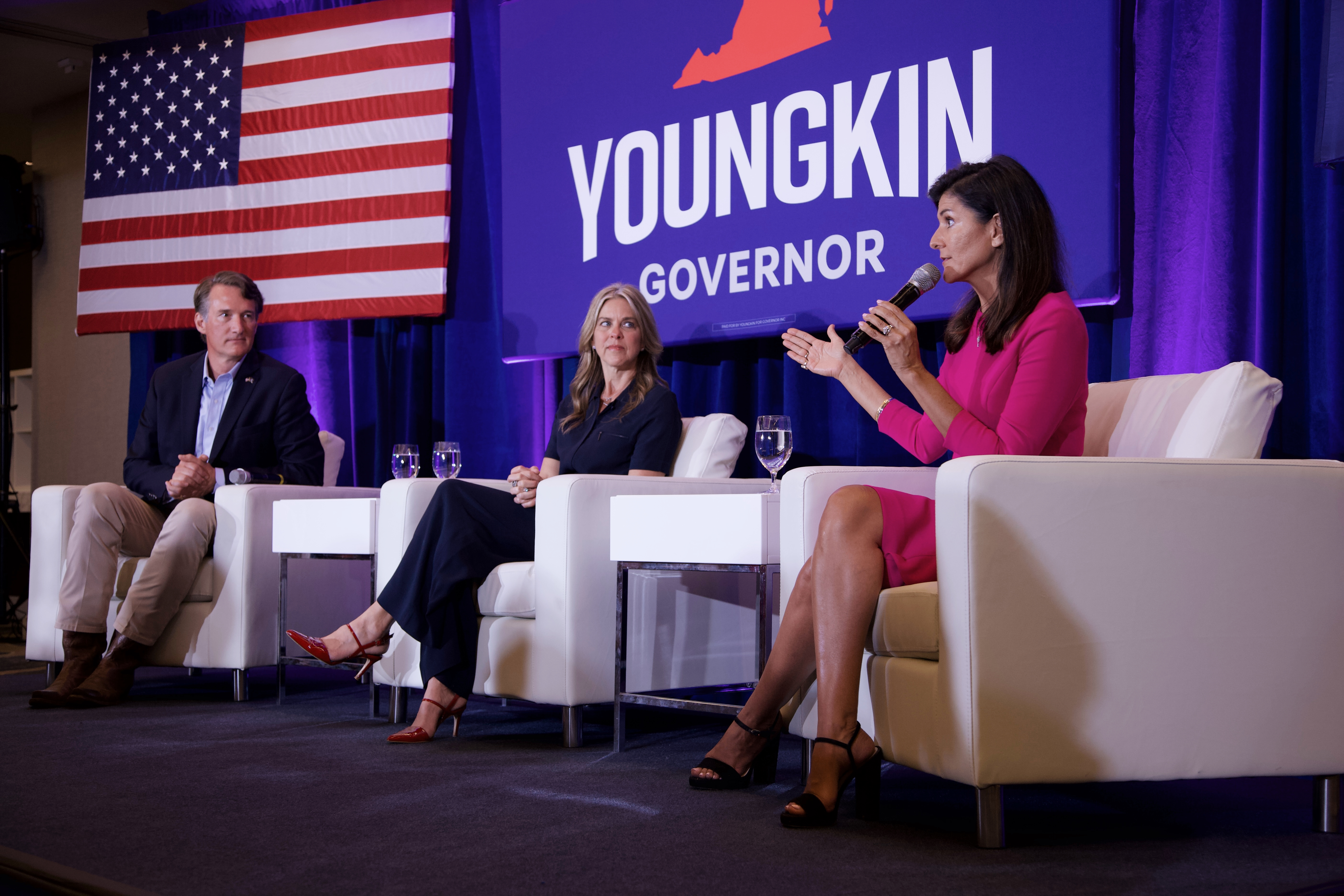
Haley endorses Glenn Youngkin's gubernatorial campaign in 2021.

In August 2019, Trump denied rumors that he had sought to replace Vice President Mike Pence with Haley as his running mate in the 2020 U.S. presidential election.

In November 2019, Haley criticized Trump's first impeachment. Comparing it to "the death penalty" for a public official, she added, "You're gonna impeach a president for asking for a favor that didn't happen and – and giving money and it wasn't withheld?"

Haley supported Trump's January 2020 killing of Iranian general Qasem Soleimani. In a Fox News appearance and a later tweet, she falsely claimed that Democrats were "mourning the loss of Soleimani."

On January 8, 2021, Haley condemned Twitter's controversial decision to suspend Trump from its platform in the aftermath of the Capitol riots. On Twitter, she compared the suspension to Chinese censorship, writing: "Silencing people, not to mention the President of the US, is what happens in China not our country. #Unbelievable."

In early 2021, Haley created a PAC to endorse and support candidates in the 2022 midterm elections. She hired former NRSC political director Betsy Ankney to be the executive director.

In October 2021, Haley was selected to replace David Wilkins for a lifetime position on the Clemson University Board of Trustees.

== 2024 presidential campaign ==
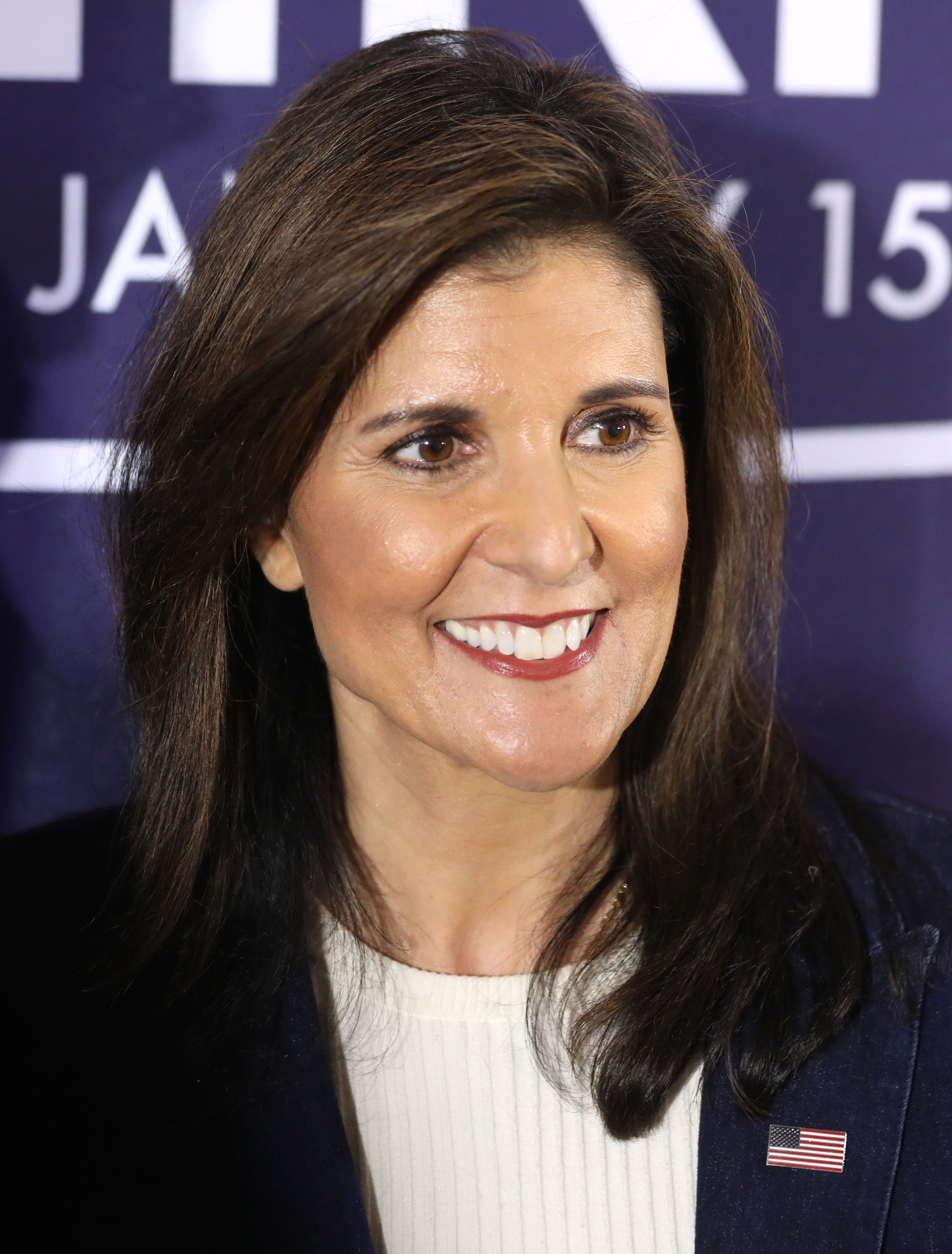
Nikki Haley speaking at an event in Ankeny, Iowa during the primary campaign

In July 2022, Haley hinted at a potential run for the 2024 United States presidential election during her speech at the Christians United for Israel summit in Washington, D.C. Her strong stance against any potential Iran nuclear deal resonated, as she asserted her readiness to "shred" such an agreement on her first day in office.

On February 14, 2023, Haley formally announced her candidacy, becoming the second major candidate to enter the race for the 2024 Republican presidential nomination, following Trump's earlier announcement. Notably, she had previously stated she would not run if Trump also sought the nomination. Trump encouraged Haley to enter the race against him, telling her to "follow her heart" and that "she should do what she wants to."

Haley's candidacy marked a historic moment as she became the fifth woman and the first woman of color to contend for the Republican presidential nomination. Despite being considered a serious contender for the nomination, Haley faced an uphill battle against Trump and Ron DeSantis.

Haley garnered endorsements from New Hampshire Gov. Chris Sununu; U.S. Representative Ralph Norman; former U.S. Representative Will Hurd; and Cindy Warmbier, the mother of Otto Warmbier. In November 2023, Haley solidified her position in the race by receiving the endorsement of Americans for Prosperity Action, an organization connected to the Koch network.

In early January 2024, CNN reported that Haley had polled within single digits of Trump (at 32%, to Trump's 39%) in New Hampshire.

On January 15, 2024, Haley finished in third place in the Iowa caucuses with 19% of the vote, behind Trump with 51% and DeSantis with 21%. Notably, she prevailed over Trump by one vote in Johnson County, showcasing pockets of support within the state.

On January 19, U.S. senator and former presidential candidate Tim Scott – who was appointed to the U.S. Senate by Haley in 2012 – endorsed Trump for president. Days before she dropped out of the race, she received the endorsements of Republican senators Susan Collins of Maine and Lisa Murkowski of Alaska.

On January 23, Haley was defeated by Trump in the New Hampshire primary, 54.3%–43.3%. After this defeat, Haley incorrectly predicted that the first party to ditch its eighty-year-old candidate will win the election.

On February 24, 2024, Haley lost the primary in her home state of South Carolina 59.8% – 39.5%.

Haley won her first primary on March 2, 2024, taking the District of Columbia Republican primary with 62% of the vote. Two days later, on Super Tuesday, she won only one primary (the Vermont Republican Party primary) compared to the 14 primaries won by Trump. On March 6, 2024, Haley announced the suspension of her campaign. On March 12, Trump officially became the party's presumptive presidential nominee.

Haley is the first woman to have won a state or territorial Republican presidential primary contest, following Shirley Chisholm as the second woman of color to secure a major party nominating contest.

== Later career (2024-present) ==
On April 15, 2024, it was announced that Haley would join the Hudson Institute, a conservative think-tank. In a statement released on the same day, she described the group's work as "critical" and said she "looked forward to partnering with them to defend the principles that make America the greatest country in the world". She serves as the Walter P. Stern Chair.

Despite suspending her campaign, Haley still received votes in Republican primaries beyond February, sometimes up to 20%. On May 11, Trump confirmed that Haley was not under consideration to be his running mate in the 2024 election. Ten days later, she stated she would vote for Trump in the general election. The New Republic described her announcement as an endorsement.

In May 2024, Haley visited Israel during the Gaza war and wrote "Finish Them!" and signed her name on artillery shells. Haley faced controversy due to Israel being accused of genocide.

Haley spoke at the Republican National Convention in July, offering her ‘strong endorsement’ of Trump.

In August 2024 Haley visited Taiwan and advocated for its full membership in the United Nations and World Health Organization. She compared the American loss of authority in Afghanistan and the ongoing violence in the Middle East to the way that Taiwan is treated by the People's Republic of China, also drawing comparisons to Russian aggression in Ukraine.

Haley joined the global communications firm Edelman as vice chair of its international public affairs team in September 2024.

In the 2024 election, she received 458 write-in votes in the state of Vermont.

On November 9, four days after Trump won the election, Trump announced that Haley would not be appointed to a position in his second administration.

In June 2026, Haley responded to Dana Bash that she wouldn't run for president when she was asked whether she would consider another White House bid.

== Political positions ==
==== Social issues ====
In February 2023, Haley supported a proposal by Senator Lindsey Graham to establish a national 15-week abortion ban, with exceptions for rape, incest, health, and life of the mother, arguing that this proposal had a chance at gaining a "national consensus." In May 2023, she pledged to sign a federal abortion ban, without specifying how many weeks such a ban should cover. In an August 2023 primary debate, Haley refused to directly say whether she supported a federal abortion ban. She supports promoting access to contraception. Following an Alabama Supreme Court decision ruling that embryos are children under state law and, therefore, that fertility clinics are liable for embryos as if they were children, Haley said she agreed with the court's reasoning and that "embryos, to me, are babies." After backlash against the ruling, Haley distanced herself from her previous comments, saying that she agrees that an embryo is an "unborn baby" but does not agree with the effect of the Alabama ruling on fertility clinics.

In February 2023, Haley said that the Florida Parental Rights in Education Act, which bars public schools from having classroom discussion about sexual orientation or gender identity for students from kindergarten through third grade, did not go far enough. She suggested that such a prohibition be extended through seventh grade, and that any discussions about sex and sexuality require parental consent. (In April 2023, Florida extended the ban through 12th grade.)

Haley has said she supports "freedom" regarding same-sex marriage, but opposes the participation of trans women in women's sports.

Haley was the third candidate, after Trump and Vivek Ramaswamy, to sign a placard circulated by the Concerned Women for America that stated "only women can be pregnant and bear children". The placard also called for federal agencies to "uphold" the concept of binary sex "in every policy and program", but stopped short of calling pregnancy a precondition for womanhood.

Haley met with Caitlyn Jenner at the UN in 2017 while US ambassador to discuss "global LGBT issues". In 2021, when a comment on social media mocked the meeting, Haley responded, "Caitlin came to see me at the UN and I appreciated her conservative views". Haley also rebuked actor Dean Cain, who had laughed at the post, tweeting "I don't find it funny."

Haley has supported a TikTok ban, citing the app's ties to the Chinese government. Her un-cited claim that "For every 30 minutes that someone watches TikTok every day, they become 17% more antisemitic, more pro-Hamas based on doing that" drew scrutiny. Vivek Ramaswamy said during the debates that Haley had "made fun of me for actually joining TikTok while her own daughter was actually using the app for a long time."

==== Fiscal issues ====
On fiscal policy, Haley has indicated that she would be willing to make significant budget cuts, including to Medicare and Social Security. She has called for raising the retirement age for future Social Security and Medicare beneficiaries (without identifying a specific age) and supports means-testing the programs. She criticized both the pandemic relief act enacted by Democrats in 2021 and the initial pandemic relief act enacted by Republicans and signed by Trump in March 2020.

==== Trump and DeSantis ====
Referencing Trump's tenure, Haley said, "We cannot have four years of chaos, vendettas and drama." She added, "America needs a captain who will steady the ship, not capsize it," emphasizing that she would support America's allies rather than praising "dictators" such as Vladimir Putin and Kim Jong Un.

As a candidate, Haley has taken an ambivalent stance toward Trump, implicitly critiquing him (for example, by calling for a "new generation" of leadership) but generally avoiding direct criticism of him. In speeches and interviews, she attempted to appeal to both Reaganite Republicans, who dominated the party in the past, and Trumpist Republicans, who have dominated the party in the 2020s. Haley has said she "would be inclined" to grant a pardon to Trump, who has been indicted on various criminal charges, saying it would be "good for the country."

She denounced the criminal charges against Trump in New York, asserting that the prosecution was "political", but took a less firm stance on the indictment of Trump for keeping classified documents, saying that if the "indictment is true...then President Trump was incredibly reckless with our national security" but also criticizing the prosecution as "overreach" and a "vendetta". During a debate in August 2023, she said she would support Trump as the Republican nominee even if he was convicted of crimes.

Trump has called Haley "birdbrain," criticizing her at a 2023 election rally for breaking the promise she made him that she would not oppose him for the party's presidential nomination if he ran again. DeSantis's campaign criticized her after Reid Hoffman, co-founder of LinkedIn and a major Democratic donor, gave $250,000 to Stand for America, Haley's Super PAC. DeSantis said she was an establishment candidate and a liberal darling.

==== Environment and energy ====
Haley has acknowledged that climate change is caused by human activity, but has rejected policies to decrease greenhouse gas emissions. She has pledged, if elected, to again withdraw the U.S. from the Paris Agreement, revoke regulations restricting fossil fuel production and curtailing pollution from power plants and vehicles, and eliminate renewable energy subsidies. She criticized the Biden administration's decision to allocate funds appropriated by the Bipartisan Infrastructure Deal to create a national electric vehicle charging network.

==== Foreign policy ====
In a February 2023 op-ed published by the New York Post, Haley vowed to "cut every cent in foreign aid for countries" that she deemed "enemies" of the United States. In June 2023, she attacked Trump and DeSantis for their positions on the Russian invasion of Ukraine. She said that Biden had not done enough on Ukraine, but did not detail what she would do differently as president.

In December 2023, Haley rejected calls for a ceasefire in the Gaza war, saying that the "best way to save people in Gaza is to eliminate Hamas." She called for a tougher approach to Iran, saying, "You've got to punch them hard." She said that Palestinian refugees from Gaza should be accepted by countries sympathetic to Hamas such as Qatar, Iran and Turkey.

Haley has faced criticism for her hawkish foreign policy positions as well as her positions on censoring and controlling social media and calling for the end of anonymous social media accounts.

==== Term limits ====
In February 2023, Haley announced that she supports congressional term limits and "mandatory mental competence tests for politicians over 75 years old," which received mixed feedback from U.S. senators.

==== Labor ====
Haley opposes labor unions and has called herself a "union buster". As governor, she sought to stop workers at South Carolina's Boeing plant from unionizing, pledging to "make the unions understand full well that they are not needed, not wanted and not welcome in the state of South Carolina."

==== American Civil War and slavery ====
At a town hall in Berlin, New Hampshire, on December 27, 2023, Haley responded to a question about the origins of the American Civil War: "I think the cause of the Civil War was basically how government was going to run. The freedoms and what people could and couldn't do." After receiving criticism for not mentioning slavery, Haley restated her position the next day, saying, "Of course the Civil War was about slavery." On January 16, 2024, Haley stated, "The US has never been a racist country."

== Personal life ==
Haley married Michael Haley on September 7, 1996. They celebrated with both Sikh and Methodist ceremonies. The couple have two children, including Nalin.

Haley converted to Christianity in 1996, when she was baptized before her wedding at St. Andrew's by the Sea United Methodist Church. However, she still identifies with aspects of the Sikh faith due to the common doctrines between Sikhism and Christianity, and remains active in the Sikh and Indian community. Haley and her husband raised their children in the United Methodist Church, but frequently took their children to Sikh worship services along with Haley's parents. She and her husband are members of Mt. Horeb Church in Lexington, South Carolina, and are also members of Sikh Religious Society of South Carolina, along with Haley's parents that reside with Haley. She visited and prayed at the Harmandir Sahib with her husband in 2014 during her visit to India. During a Christianity Today interview, when asked whether or not she hopes her parents convert to Christianity, Haley responded, "What I hope is that my parents do what's right for them.", and expressed gratitude for her Sikh upbringing.

Her husband, an officer in the South Carolina Army National Guard, had a tour of duty in Afghanistan in 2013.

Haley and her family reside on Kiawah Island, South Carolina, near the city of Charleston.

Haley had an estimated net worth of $1 million in 2019. Her net worth grew to an estimated $8 million by 2022, propelled in part by book sales and joining the corporate boards of Boeing and United Homes Group.

== Books ==
- Can't Is Not an Option: My American Story, Sentinel, New York (2012). ISBN 978-1595230850
- With All Due Respect: Defending America with Grit and Grace, St. Martin's Press, New York (2019). ISBN 978-1250266552
- Foreword of A Better Blueprint for International Organizations: Advancing American Interests on the Global Stage, Foundation for Defense of Democracies, (2021).
- If You Want Something Done: Leadership Lessons from Bold Women, St. Martin's Press, New York (2022). ISBN 978-1250284976

== Awards and honors ==
Haley was inducted into the Order of the Palmetto in 2010. She has two honorary degrees: a Doctorate of Humanities from Clemson University (2018) and a Doctorate of Public Service from the University of South Carolina (2015). In 2013, Haley received an honorary 4th-dan black belt in Taekwondo.

Haley has also received awards from India Abroad, the International Republican Institute, Christians United for Israel, the Foundation for Defense of Democracies, the Hudson Institute, the Independent Women's Forum, UN Watch, the Simon Wiesenthal Center, the American Enterprise Institute, and the World Jewish Congress.

== Electoral history ==
South Carolina House of Representatives 87th District Republican Primary Election, 2004
Party	Candidate	Votes	%
Republican	Larry Koon (incumbent)	2,354	42.3%
Republican	Nikki Haley	2,247	40.4%
Republican	David Perry	968	17.4%
Total votes		5,569	100

SC House of Representatives 87th District Republican Primary Election Runoff, 2004
Party	Candidate	Votes	%
Republican	Nikki Haley	2,929	54.7%
Republican	Larry Koon (incumbent)	2,426	45.3%
Total votes		5,355	100

SC House of Representatives 87th District Election, 2004
Party	Candidate	Votes	%
Republican	Nikki Haley	14,421	98.9%
None	Write-ins	155	1.1%
Total votes		14,576	100
Republican hold			

SC House of Representatives 87th District Election, 2006
Party	Candidate	Votes	%
Republican	Nikki Haley (incumbent)	11,387	99.5%
None	Write-ins	60	0.5%
Total votes		11,447	100
Republican hold			

SC House of Representatives 87th District Election, 2008
Party	Candidate	Votes	%
Republican	Nikki Haley (incumbent)	17,043	83.1%
Democratic	Edgar Gomez	3,446	16.8%
None	Write-ins	16	0.1%
Total votes		20,505	100
Republican hold			

South Carolina Governor Republican Primary Election, 2010
Party	Candidate	Votes	%
Republican	Nikki Haley	206,326	48.9%
Republican	Gresham Barrett	91,824	21.8%
Republican	Henry McMaster	71,494	16.9%
Republican	Andre Bauer	52,607	12.5%
Total votes		422,251	100

South Carolina Governor Republican Primary Election Runoff, 2010
Party	Candidate	Votes	%
Republican	Nikki Haley	233,733	65.1%
Republican	Gresham Barrett	125,601	35.0%
Total votes		655,984	100

South Carolina Governor Election, 2010
Party	Candidate	Votes	%
Republican	Nikki Haley	690,525	51.4%
Democratic	Vincent Sheheen	630,534	46.9%
Green	Morgan Bruce Reeves	20,114	1.5%
None	Write-ins	3,025	0.2%
Total votes		1,344,188	100
Republican hold			

South Carolina Governor Election, 2014
Party	Candidate	Votes	%
Republican	Nikki Haley (incumbent)	696,645	55.9%
Democratic	Vincent Sheheen	516,166	41.4%
Libertarian	Steve French	15,438	1.2%
Independent	Tom Ervine	11,496	0.9%
United Citizens	Morgan Bruce Reeves	5,622	0.5%
None	Write-ins	934	0.1%
Total votes		1,243,601	100
Republican hold			

== See also ==
- 2024 Republican Party presidential candidates
- Asian American and Pacific Islands American conservatism in the United States
- Foreign policy of the first Trump administration
- List of ambassadors appointed in the first Trump presidency
- List of female ambassadors of the United States
- List of female governors in the United States
- List of female United States Cabinet members
- List of female United States presidential and vice presidential candidates
- List of governors of South Carolina
- List of Indian Americans
- List of minority governors and lieutenant governors in the United States

Party political offices
Preceded by Mark Sanford	Republican nominee for Governor of South Carolina; 2010, 2014	Succeeded by Henry McMaster
Preceded by Joni Ernst	Response to the State of the Union address 2016	Succeeded by Steve Beshear
Political offices
Preceded by Mark Sanford	Governor of South Carolina; 2011–2017	Succeeded by Henry McMaster
Diplomatic posts
Preceded by Samantha Power	United States Ambassador to the United Nations; 2017–2018	Succeeded by Kelly Craft
U.S. order of precedence (ceremonial)
Preceded by Mark Sanford as Former Governor	Order of precedence of the United States; Within South Carolina	Succeeded by Jack Markell as Former Governor
Preceded by Mark Sanford as Former Governor	Order of precedence of the United States; Outside South Carolina	Succeeded by John H. Sununu as Former Governor
