= With All Due Respect (book) =

2019 memoir by Nikki Haley

- Author: Nikki Haley
- Language: English
- Genre: Memoir
- Published: 12 November 2019
- Publication place: United States
- ISBN: 9-781-2502-6655-2

With All Due Respect: Defending America with Grit and Grace is a memoir by Nikki Haley about her years as United States Ambassador to the United Nations. It was published by St. Martin's Press on November 12, 2019. The title comes from a comment she made to Fox News – "With all due respect, I don't get confused".
