= 2011 Republican National Committee chairmanship election =

American party leadership vote

- January 14, 2011

168 members of the Republican National Committee 85 votes needed to win
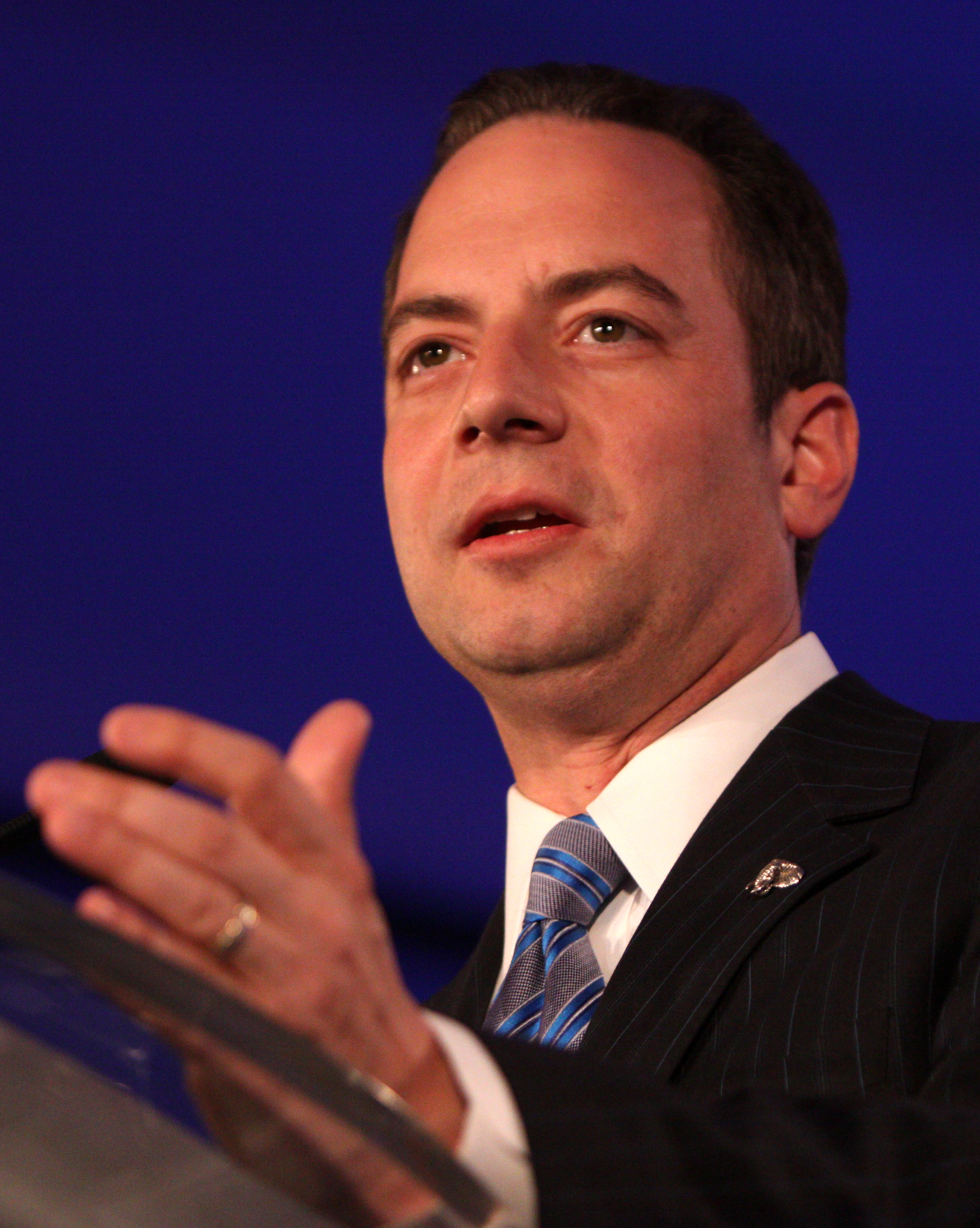

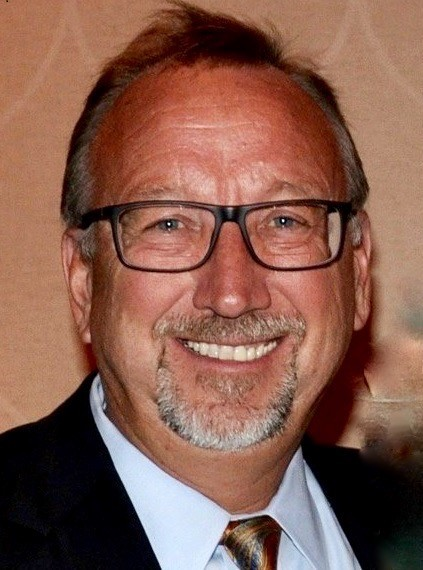

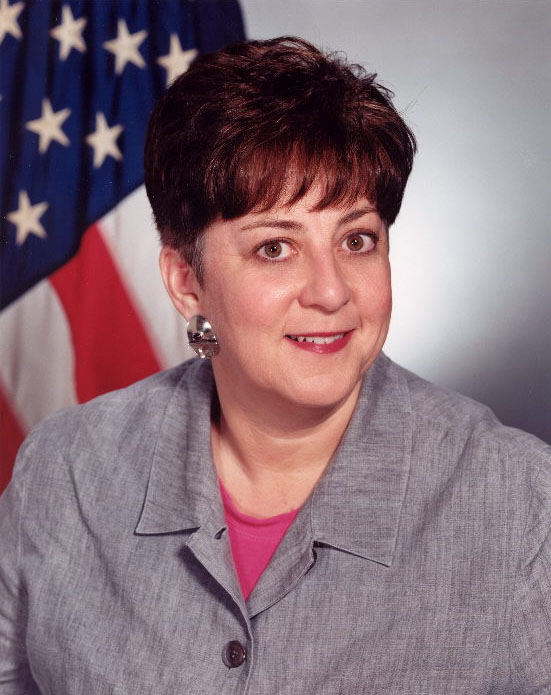

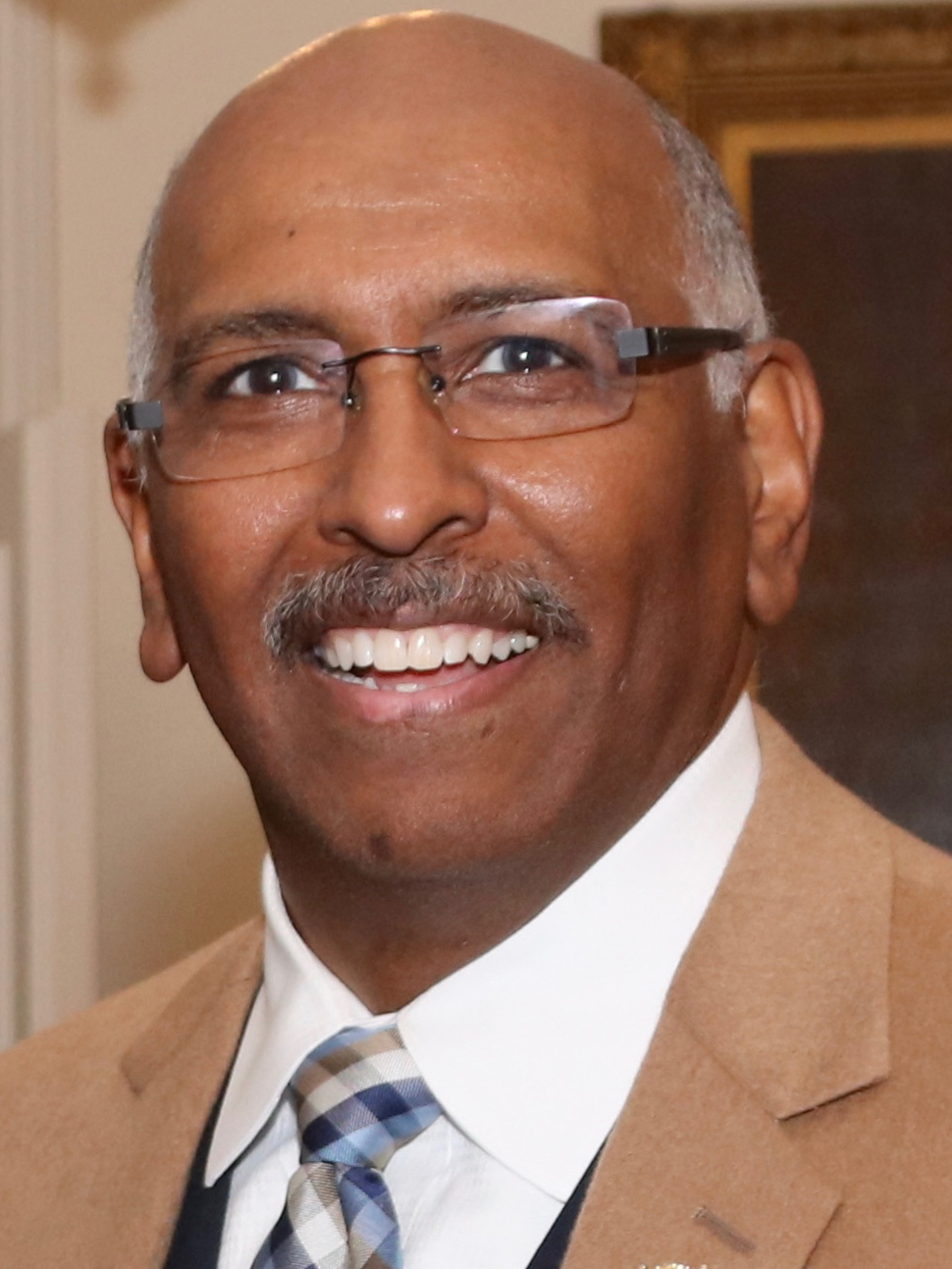
Candidate	Reince Priebus	Saul Anuzis
First round	45 votes 26.8%	24 votes 14.3%
Seventh round	97 votes 57.7%	43 votes 25.5%
Candidate	Maria Cino	Michael Steele
First round	32 votes 19.0%	44 votes 26.2%
Seventh round	28 votes 16.6%	Withdrawn
Chairman before election
Michael Steele
Elected Chairman
Reince Priebus

The 2011 Republican National Committee (RNC) chairmanship election was held on January 14, 2011, to determine the next chairman of the RNC. After seven rounds of balloting, Reince Priebus was elected chairman over incumbent chair Michael Steele, Saul Anuzis, Ann Wagner and Maria Cino.

Priebus won re-election with near unanimity in the party's 2013 meeting in Charlotte, North Carolina. He was likewise re-elected to a third term in 2015, setting him up to become the longest serving head of the party ever.

== Candidates ==
- Saul Anuzis, National Chairman for the Save American Jobs Project, former Michigan Republican Party Chairman
- Maria Cino, Political Director of George Bush's 2000 Campaign
- Reince Priebus, Chairman of the Republican Party of Wisconsin
- Michael Steele, incumbent Committee Chairman, former Lieutenant Governor of Maryland
- Ann Wagner, former United States Ambassador to Luxembourg, former Missouri Republican Party Chairman

Former candidates who withdrew before voting began

- Gentry Collins, Former Political Director of the RNC, withdrew on January 2, 2010
- Gary Emineth, Chairman of the North Dakota Republican Party

== Timeline ==
- December 13, 2010 – Incumbent Chair Steele announces bid for re-election.
- January 3, 2011 – Candidate debate held by Americans for Tax Reform at the National Press Club
- January 14, 2011 – Election held by party voting members in Washington, D.C.

== Debates ==
A debate among the candidates hosted by Americans for Tax Reform took place on January 3, 2011, at the National Press Club. Anuzis, Cino, Priebus, Steele, and Wagner participated in the debate.

- Republican Committee Chair Debate, C-SPAN, January 3, 2011, full video

== Polling ==
A poll by the National Journal, released on January 13, 2011, showed Priebus in the lead with 40 committed votes out of 168, Steele 17, Wagner 15, Anuzis 14, and Cino 12.

== Results ==
With 168 voting members of the RNC, 85 votes were required to win the chairmanship.

Candidate	Round 1	Round 2	Round 3	Round 4	Round 5	Round 6	Round 7
Reince Priebus	45	52	54	58	67	80	97
Saul Anuzis	24	22	21	24	32	37	43
Maria Cino	32	30	28	29	40	34	28
Ann Wagner	23	27	32	28	28	17	Withdrew
Michael Steele	44	37	33	28	Withdrew		

Candidate won majority of votes in the round
Candidate secured a plurality of votes in the round
Candidate withdrew
