= 2009 Republican National Committee chairmanship election =

American party leadership vote

- January 20, 2009

168 members of the Republican National Committee 85 votes needed to win
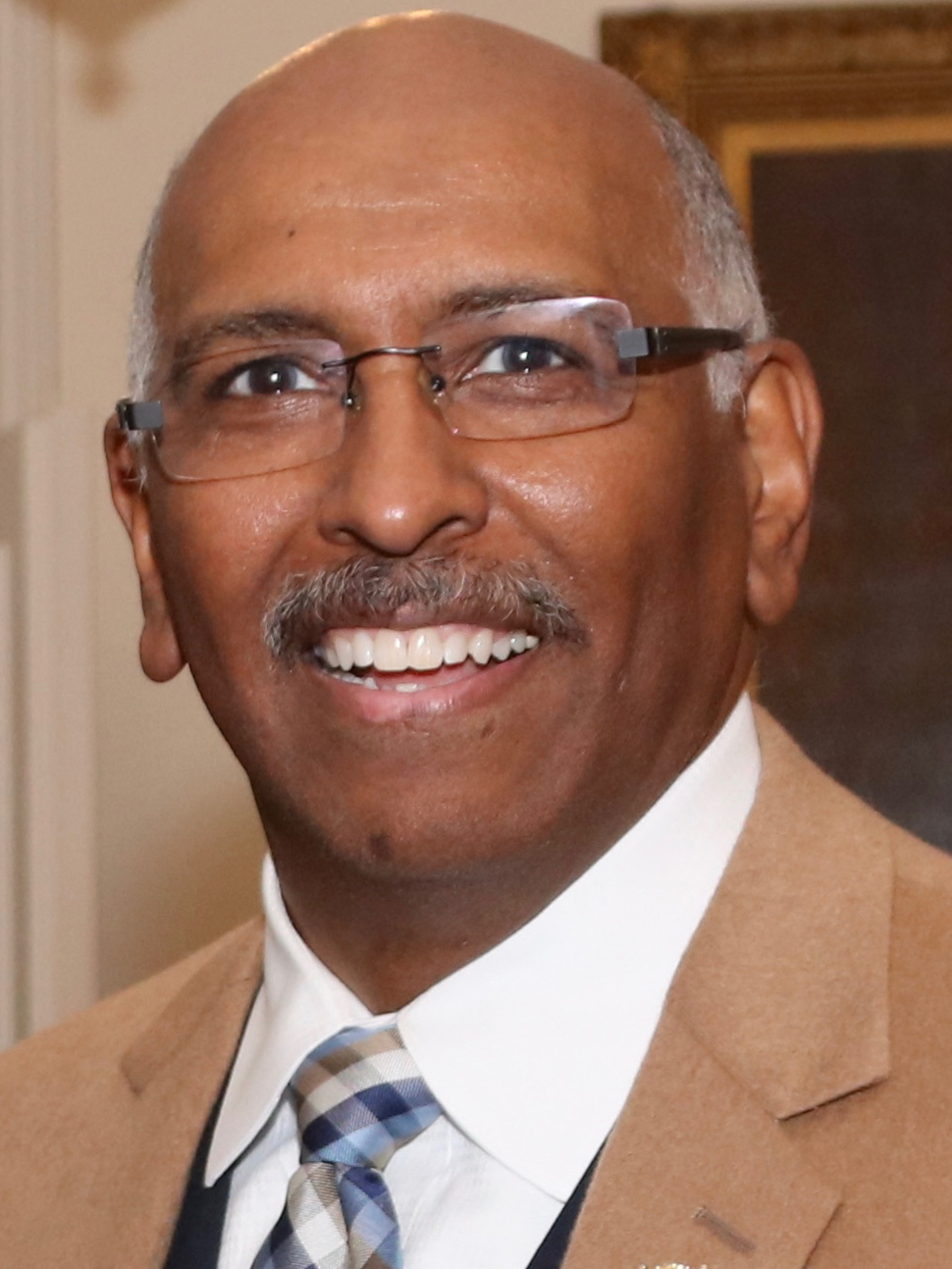

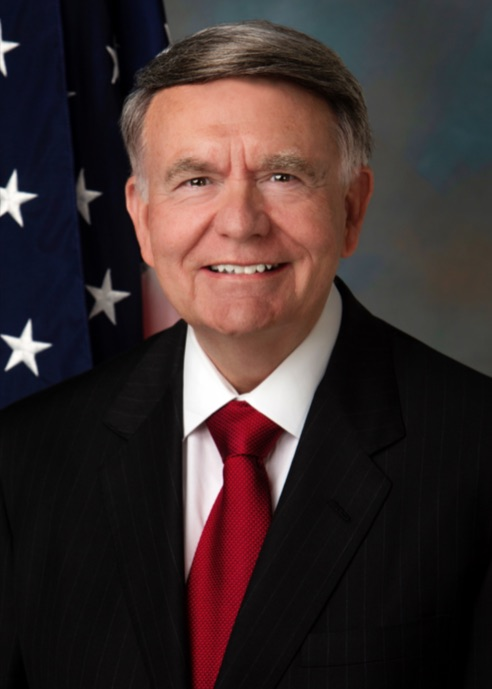

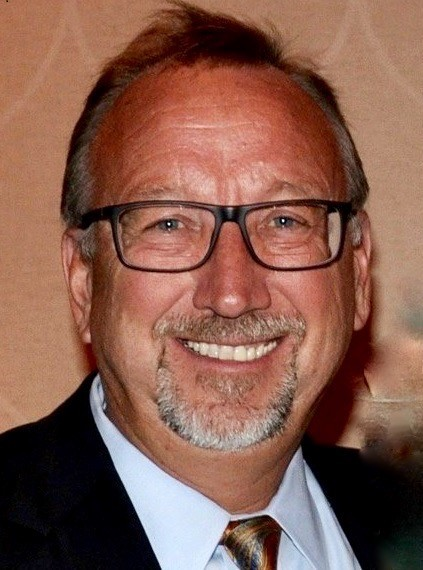
Candidate	Michael Steele	Katon Dawson
First round	46 votes 27.4%	28 votes 16.7%
Sixth round	91 votes 54.2%	77 votes 45.8%
Candidate	Mike Duncan	Saul Anuzis
First round	52 votes 31.0%	22 votes 13.1%
Sixth round	Withdrawn	Withdrawn
Chairman before election
Mike Duncan
Elected Chairman
Michael Steele

The 2009 Republican National Committee chairmanship election started out as a six-way race, and ended on the sixth ballot with Michael Steele becoming the first African-American chairman of the Republican National Committee. The Washington Times called it the "'Dirtiest ever' race for RNC chairman."

== Pre-campaign ==
On November 11, 2008, Jeff Burton launched a political draft website to encourage Steele to run for Republican National Committee Chairman. The website allowed visitors to sign a draft petition and received over 6,000 signatures.

== Campaign ==
Katon Dawson announced his official bid on November 24, 2008. Dawson was one of two candidates to earn votes on each of the six votes taken; he lost the final ballot to winner Michael Steele, 91–77.

On November 24, 2008, Steele launched his own campaign website, and confirmed his intention to run on Hannity and Colmes. Steele, seen as an early frontrunner, rejected the idea that the color of his skin had anything to do with his chances at becoming RNC chair, saying, "I am a Republican who happens to be African-American."

Chip Saltsman was the first candidate to release a specific plan regarding the future of the party, which can be viewed at Our Plan for Republican Victory. In his bid for the RNC Chairmanship, Saltsman had been endorsed by: former Republican presidential candidate Governor Mike Huckabee, former United States Senate Majority Leader Bill Frist, Tennessee Lt. Governor Ron Ramsey, and Tennessee House Majority Leader Jason Mumpower.

USA Today reported that, "half of the candidates to lead the Republican National Committee (RNC) are Southerners: current Chairman Mike Duncan of Kentucky, South Carolina Chairman Katon Dawson and former Tennessee chairman Chip Saltsman. Former Ohio secretary of State Ken Blackwell and former Maryland lieutenant governor Michael Steele are black. Saul Anuzis, the Michigan GOP chairman, is a Harley-Davidson rider, an ex-union member and the son of an autoworker.

=== "Barack the Magic Negro" controversy ===
For Christmas 2008, Chip Saltsman sent members of the Republican National Committee a music CD of 41 songs that included one entitled "Barack the Magic Negro" set to the tune of "Puff, the Magic Dragon". The origin of the song was the title a Los Angeles Times column, written by David Ehrenstein in March 2007 that criticized the reception that Obama, a long shot candidate at the time, was getting in white America; Ehrenstein described the image of Obama in white America as that of a Magical Negro, a stereotypical gentle black man who helps white people, often used in movies created by white people. Rush Limbaugh commented on the column the day it published, and interpreted it as criticizing Obama himself, called the column an example of "the racism of the left," and sang the words, "Barack the Magic Negro", to the tune of "Puff the Magic Dragon." Shortly after that Paul Shanklin recorded a song about Barack the Magic Negro set to that same tune, which Limbaugh played numerous times throughout the 2008 presidential election season. This is the song that Saltsman included on his CD. Saltsman's campaign imploded as a result of the controversy caused by the CD, and he withdrew from the race.

=== Voting ===
The election was decided in late January after six rounds of voting, with Steele elected chairman by a majority vote of the 168 committee members.

Candidate	Round 1	Round 2	Round 3	Round 4	Round 5	Round 6
Michael Steele	46	48	51	60	79	91
Katon Dawson	28	29	34	62	69	77
Saul Anuzis	22	24	24	31	20	Withdrew
Ken Blackwell	20	19	15	15	Withdrew	
Mike Duncan	52	48	44	Withdrew		

Candidate won that round of voting
Candidate withdrew
Candidate won RNC Chairmanship

After the third round of balloting Duncan dropped out of contention without endorsing a candidate. Ken Blackwell, the only other African-American candidate, dropped out after the fourth ballot and endorsed Steele, though Blackwell had been the most socially conservative of the candidates and Steele had been accused of not being "sufficiently conservative." Steele picked up Blackwell's votes. After the fifth round, Steele held a ten-vote lead over Katon Dawson, with 79 votes, and Saul Anuzis dropped out.

=== The sixth round ===
The final push that led to Steele's win was from the eight voters from the Northern Mariana Islands, Guam, American Samoa and the Virgin Islands, who switched to Steele after Anuzis dropped out. Steele won the chairmanship of the RNC in the sixth round, with 91 votes to Dawson's 77.

== See also ==
- 2009 Democratic National Committee chairmanship election
