= Katon Dawson =

American politician

Chair of the South Carolina Republican Party
- In office May 2002 – May 2009
- Preceded by: Henry McMaster
- Succeeded by: Karen Floyd

Personal details
- Born: February 29, 1956 (age 70) Columbia, South Carolina, U.S.
- Party: Republican
- Education: University of South Carolina, Columbia

Katon Edwards Dawson (born February 29, 1956) is an American politician from the state of South Carolina, former chairman of the South Carolina Republican Party and was a 2009 candidate for chairman of the Republican National Committee.

== Early life ==
Dawson was born in Columbia, South Carolina in then-heavily Democratic South Carolina, his parents helped organize the state's first GOP precincts. Dawson says his political interest came from attending a Barry Goldwater speech in 1964, and first volunteered for Richard Nixon's 1968 presidential campaign.

Dawson graduated from the University of South Carolina.

== Political career ==
Dawson was elected Richland County GOP vice chairman in 1994 and state party chair 2002.

In 2006, despite nationwide losses by the Republican party, the South Carolina GOP carried eight of nine statewide constitutional offices.

In August 2007 Dawson drew national attention for his decision to move the 2008 South Carolina Republican presidential primary from Feb. 2 to January 29, preserving the state's "first in the South" primary. In every election since 1980, the winner of the South Carolina primary has won the Republican presidential nomination, except in 2012 when Newt Gingrich won the primary and did not secure the nomination.

During Dawson's chairmanship, the South Carolina GOP has made progress with outreach to African-Americans and in promoting minorities to leadership positions, electing its first African-American member of the Republican National Committee from the South, and in 2008 the first black Republican State Representative since Reconstruction was elected.

Dawson became the first state Republican chair to endorse the "Drill Here. Drill Now. Pay Less." campaign launched by former House Speaker Newt Gingrich's organization American Solutions.

Dawson expressed his interest in chairing the Republican National Committee in October 2007 when reports confirmed Senator Mel Martinez would be stepping down, but did not actively campaign until he announced his official bid on November 24, 2008 for the 2009 RNC Chairmanship Election. Dawson was one of two candidates to earn votes on each of the six votes taken; he lost the final ballot to winner Michael Steele, 91-77. It was reported that in September 2008 Dawson resigned his membership in the Forest Lake Club, a whites-only country club located in Columbia, South Carolina, amid controversy. A 2017 Guardian article, though, states "It was later discovered that he had remained a member the whole time."

RNC Chairman Vote

Source: CQPolitics, and Poll Pundit

Candidate	Round 1	Round 2	Round 3	Round 4	Round 5	Round 6
Michael Steele	46	48	51	60	79	91
Katon Dawson	28	29	34	62	69	77
Saul Anuzis	22	24	24	31	20	Withdrew
Ken Blackwell	20	19	15	15	Withdrew	
Mike Duncan	52	48	44	Withdrew		

Candidate won that Round of voting
Candidate withdrew
Candidate won RNC Chairmanship

== Personal life ==
Dawson lives with his wife Candy in Columbia, S.C. They have two children, Anna and Katon Jr.

== See also ==
- South Carolina Republican Party

Party political offices
Preceded by Henry McMaster	Chairperson of the South Carolina Republican Party; 2002–2009	Succeeded by Karen Floyd
