= 1998 Ohio Secretary of State election =

- November 3, 1998
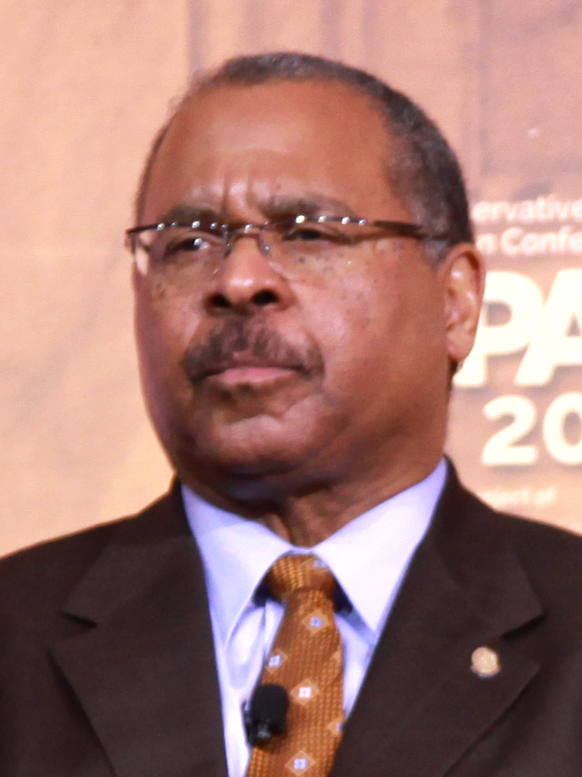

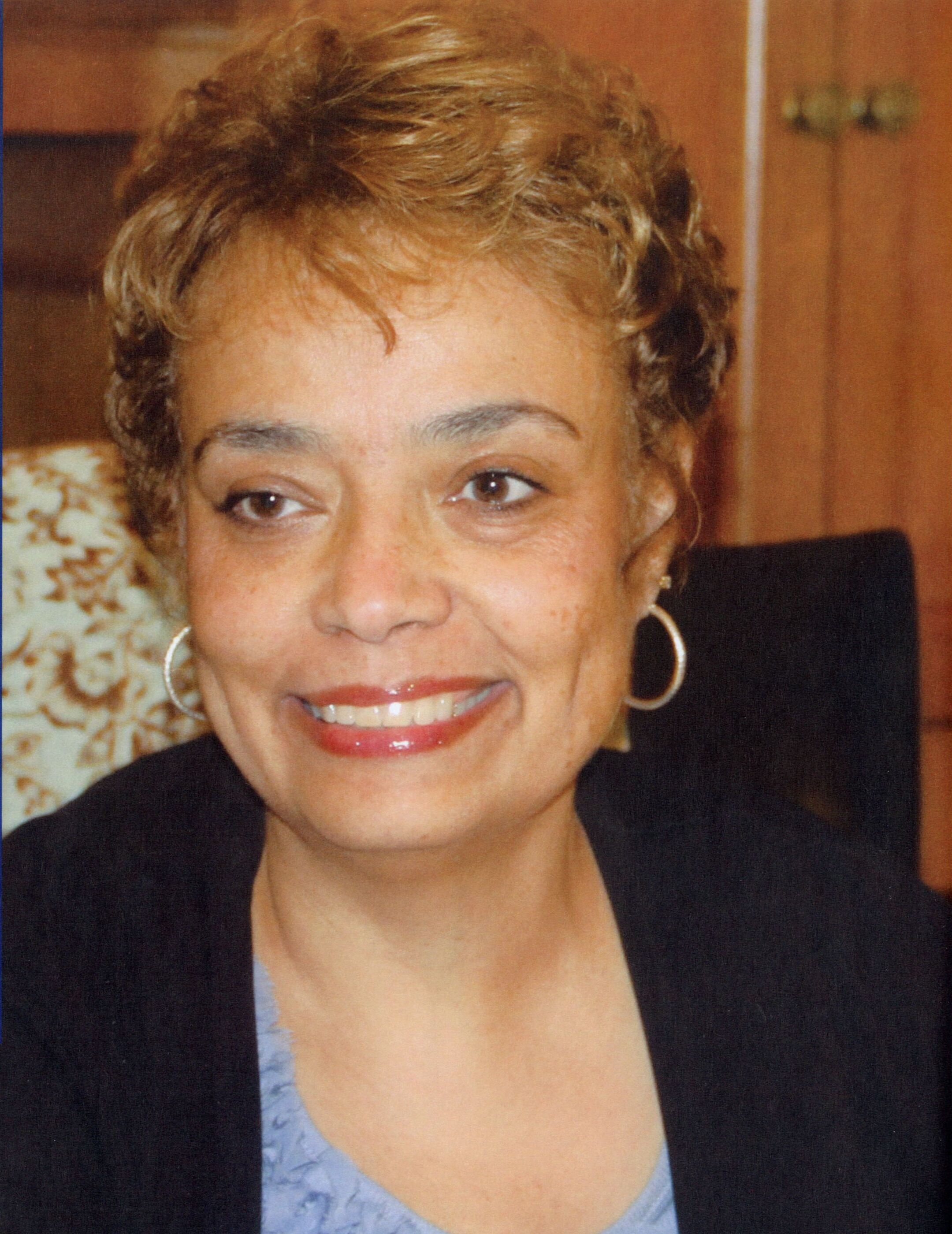
Nominee	Ken Blackwell	Charleta Tavares
Party	Republican	Democratic
Popular vote	1,789,105	1,404,081
Percentage	56.03%	43.97%
- County results Blackwell: 50–60% 60–70% 70-80% Taraves: 50–60% 60–70%
Secretary of State before election
Bob Taft
Republican
Elected Secretary of State
Ken Blackwell
Republican

The 1998 Ohio Secretary of State election was held on November 3, 1998, to elect the Ohio Secretary of State. Primaries were held on May 3, 1998. Incumbent Republican Ohio Secretary of State Bob Taft was term-limited and could not run for a third consecutive term.

Republican Ohio State Treasurer Ken Blackwell won the election, defeating Democratic Ohio House Representative Charleta Tavares with 56.03% of the vote.

== Republican primary ==
=== Candidates ===
- Ken Blackwell, Ohio State Treasurer (1994–1999)

=== Campaign ===
Blackwell won the Republican nomination unopposed.

=== Results ===
Republican primary results
Party	Candidate	Votes	%
Republican	Ken Blackwell	601,746	100%
Total votes		601,746	100.00%

== Democratic primary ==
=== Candidates ===
- Charleta Tavares, Ohio House Representative (1993–1998)
- Mark Hanni, Attorney

=== Campaign ===
Tavares easily defeated Attorney Mark Hanni to seize the Democratic nomination, winning by over 20 percentage points.

=== Results ===
Democratic primary results
Party	Candidate	Votes	%
Democratic	Charleta Tavares	427,805	63.87%
Democratic	Mark Hanni	241,988	36.13%
Total votes		669,793	100.00%

== General election ==
=== Candidates ===
- Ken Blackwell, Ohio State Treasurer (1994–1999) (Republican)
- Charleta Tavares, Ohio House Representative (1993–1998)
- Robert Anthony Martin (Write-in)

=== Results ===
1998 Ohio Secretary of State election results
Party	Candidate	Votes	%	±%
Republican	Ken Blackwell	1,789,105	56.03%	−8.75%
Democratic	Charleta Tavares	1,404,081	43.97%	+8.75%
Write-in	Robert Anthony Martin	186	0.01%	
Total votes		3,193,372	100.00%	
Republican hold				
