= Gentry Collins =

American politician

Gentry Collins is a Republican politician in the United States. He has formerly served as both the RNC political director and the executive director of the Iowa Republican Party. In 2010 Collins ran to replace Michael Steele as head of the Republican National Committee but dropped out before the eventual election of Reince Priebus. On December 28, 2010, an interview with Collins was broadcast on C-SPAN's "Newsmakers" program.
