= Right Now (book) =

2010 book by Michael Steele

- Author: Michael Steele
- Publisher: Regnery Publishing
- Publication date: January 4, 2010
- ISBN: 9781596981089

Right Now: A 12-Step Program for Defeating the Obama Agenda, written by Michael Steele, was released on January 4, 2010. The book was published by Regnery Publishing.

== Content ==
MSNBC reported, "In his new book, Right Now, Republican National Committee chairman Michael Steele writes that Republicans have made the mistake of drifting away from their conservative roots."

The Associated Press reported, "Steele focuses much of the book on familiar GOP denunciations of President Barack Obama's overall policies (a roadmap to failure), the $787 billion stimulus bill (a reckless, wasteful, pork-laden spending spree), liberal views on manmade global warming (A threat to life on Earth? Depends on whom you ask) and other issues. To regain the public confidence, Steele says the GOP should, among other things, expose the reign of error inherent in liberal policies, contrast conservative and liberal principles, and highlight the damage caused by Obama's policies while explaining conservative solutions."

CNN reported, “In his new book, Republican National Committee chairman Michael Steele accuses President Obama of being "hypocritical" for choosing to send his daughters to an expensive private school while also killing a voucher program that offered low-income children in Washington the chance to do the same.”

== Response ==
Christian Toto, of Human Events, stated that “Republican National Committee Chairman Michael Steele feels the same sense of urgency regarding the Obama administration’s policies as do fellow conservatives. It’s why Steele’s new book feels like it was written after reading the latest headlines on The Drudge Report.

Frances Rice, of Canada Free Press, called it "a bold new book that attacks Obama’s big-government agenda, and reaches out to town-hallers, tea partiers, independents, and anyone fed up with a federal government spiraling out of control.”

Dan Balz, of the Washington Post, called it "a predictable broadside aimed at President Obama, the Democrats and all things liberal. But it is also a broadside aimed at the Republican Party and its leadership over the past decade. He writes less as chairman of the Republican National Committee and more as would-be president of the Tea Party movement, with whom he seems to feel more kinship and camaraderie than with the Republican establishment whose chairmanship he actively sought. Much of what he says, in both substance and style, will resonate with conservatives."

Eugene Robinson, stated that the book "just adds to the compendium that should be called the Quotations of Chairman Mike."

Frank Rich, of the New York Times, stated that the book "attacks unnamed party leaders in its pages for forsaking conservative principles."

Linda Feldmann, of the Christian Science Monitor, placed Steele's book within a number of conservative political manifestos “hoping to repeat Newt Gingrich's 1994 success in taking over the House with his 'Contract With America.'”

Marta Mossburg, of the Washington Examiner, stated, "The book drips with hypocrisy. He claims Republicans 'reject identity politics' and that a 'lot of bad ideas flow from categorizing people as either victims or oppressors.' But as a Senate candidate and as lieutenant governor of Maryland, he championed minority business subsidies and affirmative action. In the book, Steele slams President Obama for sending his daughters to private school while rejecting school choice for poor Washington D. C. children. As lieutenant governor in Maryland, he headed a commission whose final report never mentioned school vouchers, a key component of any school choice platform. The report rightly endorsed expanding charter schools, but where was his outrage for Baltimore City children denied access to safe, effective learning environment."

During a conversation with Eddie Glaude, the chair of the Center for African American Studies, Glaude asked Michael Steele about the intended audience of his book. Steele discussed the importance of both Democrat and Republican agendas and stated, "You want to be intellectually armed to talk to your opponents. So [the book] is written for you. You may not agree with it, but at least when you're done, you'll understand why I say what I say."

=== Republican response ===
The Hill reported that on January 7, "Republican staffers in Congress held a conference call with RNC staff," in which they discussed "reining in Steele, whose off-the-cuff remarks during a media tour to promote his new book have stoked GOP establishment dyspepsia." Steele responded during an interview on the Christian Broadcasting Network, "This book is a book a lot of those staffers who are trying to get the chairman on message or muzzle the chairman, it's a book they don't want you to read. They don't want you to read this book because a guilty conscience is a funny thing.”

On January 8, the Washington Post reported that "Republican congressional leaders say they did not know that their party chairman, Michael S. Steele, was publishing a book until it was released this week, and they had no input in drafting what Steele is promoting as the blueprint Republicans should follow to win back power." The Washington Post reported that GOP congressional aides stated that "more than half a dozen Republican Senate and House leaders have been upset with Steele's remarks and the book. None has spoken out publicly against Steele-- in part, aides said, because the leaders see little benefit to continued strife within GOP ranks."

On January 10, the Seattle Times reported that the "Republican Party's national chairman says he's had no thoughts of resigning despite criticism of his first-year performance and controversy about his recent book that takes shots at the GOP. Michael Steele is apologizing for not alerting Republicans in advance about the book's release. In the book, he accuses GOP leaders of abandoning conservative principles over the past decade. Steele also is defending his record as party chairman, saying he's "pushing the ball" for the GOP and helping the party win elections and raise money.”

On January 13, the Washington Times reported that "Senior Republican National Committee members are preparing a motion demanding that RNC Chairman Michael S. Steele cancel promotional events for the book he wrote as chairman. The proposed motion, to be presented to the 168-member RNC at its annual winter meeting in Honolulu at the end of this month, also would direct him to donate to the RNC and Republican candidates all proceeds from the book.” On January 30, the Washington Times reported that the Republican National Committee abandoned the motion that "would have directed Mr. Steele to stop touring the country to promote his book, redirected all proceeds from book sales to the RNC, and it would have banned speech-making for personal financial gain."

== Honest Injun controversy ==
Steele attracted controversy by using the phrase "honest Injun" during an interview while promoting the book.”

On January 4, "Sean Hannity hosted RNC Chairman Michael Steele to promote the release of Steele's new book, Right Now: A 12-Step Program for Defeating the Obama Agenda. During the interview, Steele emphatically denied that the GOP needs 'more modern' ideas, calling the party's platform 'one of the best political documents' produced in the last quarter-century. 'Honest Injun on that,' he added."

On January 5, The Hill reported that Rep. Dale Kildee (D-MI) said, "The Co-Chairman of the Congressional Native American Caucus demanded an apology from RNC Chairman Michael Steele for using a 'racist' phrase on national television." Kildee was quoted as stating that Steele's "insensitive comment undermines and threatens to reverse the progress we have made to correct those wrongs. A cursory look through a dictionary or even some knowledge of Native American history would show Mr. Steele that the term is a racial slur for Native Americans. I strongly urge Mr. Steele to publicly apologize to the Native American community immediately for his derogatory comment."

On January 10, The Raw Story reported that Rep. Tom Cole, a member of the Chickasaw Nation, "called Steele's remarks 'unacceptable' and said, 'It's an offensive phrase in the Native American community.'"

== See also ==
- United States elections, 2010
