= 60 Plus Association =

American conservative political organization for seniors

The 60 Plus American Association of Senior Citizens is an American conservative advocacy group founded in 1992 and based in Alexandria, Virginia. Its stated purpose is to promote solutions to seniors' issues that are grounded in free markets, less government, and less taxes. The organization is pro-Republican Party. The organization is known for its advocacy for the privatization of Social Security and senior citizen health programs, as well as its opposition to the estate tax. The organization has been funded by Charles and David Koch (of Koch Industries). Although the organization did have ties to Koch family in the past, they said in 2022 that there have been no contributions from anyone in the Koch network for well over a decade.

== Political advocacy ==
The organization is known for its advocacy for the privatization of Social Security and senior citizen health programs, as well as its opposition to the estate tax. The organization bills itself as a conservative alternative to the American Association of Retired Persons (AARP). In the 2012 election, the organization ran a $3.5 million ad campaign which claimed that President Barack Obama had proposed rationing and denial of certain Medicare treatments, and that he would cut $500 billion from the program.

A 2021 advertising campaign run by 60 Plus asserted that drug price negotiations with pharmaceutical companies would take $500 billion from Medicare to "cut benefits and no longer pay for lifesaving medicines." PolitiFact called the advertisement misleading and rated it as false. Another 60 Plus attack ad targeting West Virginia Senator Joe Manchin in 2022 stated that provisions in the Build Back Better Act allowing the government to negotiate prices for prescription drugs would "strip $300 billion from Medicare." The ad was found to use misleading math and earned Three Pinocchios from Glenn Kessler's "Fact Checker" feature in The Washington Post.

== Funding ==
As a 501(c)(4) nonprofit organization, the 60 Plus Association is not required to disclose its donors. In 2002, The Washington Post reported that 60 Plus received an unrestricted educational grant (which can be used as most needed) from the Pharmaceutical Research and Manufacturers of America, also known as PhRMA. Ken Johnson, senior vice president and spokesman for PhRMA said that as of 2009 the association had not provided any funding to 60 Plus for in nearly five years. In 2009, Carl Forti, a political consultant and spokesman for 60 Plus said, "I don't believe PhRMA has ever given 60 Plus money." He added that 60 Plus is funded by donations from its 5.5 million members. In 2019, PhRMA contributed at least $75,000 to 60 Plus.

In 2014, documents left behind by an attendee at an exclusive "donor seminar" put on by Charles and David Koch (of Koch Industries) revealed that the billionaire brothers count the 60 Plus Association as a part of their political network.

In 2014, as a sign of the diversity within Koch-funded projects, the Freedom Partners supported 60 Plus Association ran TV ads that the Koch brothers did not agree with.

== Staff ==
60 Plus is led by its chairman, James L. Martin, a veteran of the US Marines. He previously led several conservative advocacy groups, and was chief of staff for six years for former Republican Congressman and Senator, Edward Gurney of Florida. Martin also served as a member of President George W. Bush's health and human services transition team. In 2017, Saul Anuzis was named president of the 60 Plus Association. Anuzis is a Michigan politician who was chairman of the Michigan Republican Party from 2005 to 2009 and was also a candidate for chairman of the Republican National Committee in 2009 and 2011. Singer Pat Boone has served as lead spokesman for 60 Plus.
