= 2009 Democratic National Committee chairmanship election =

American party leadership vote

- January 21, 2009
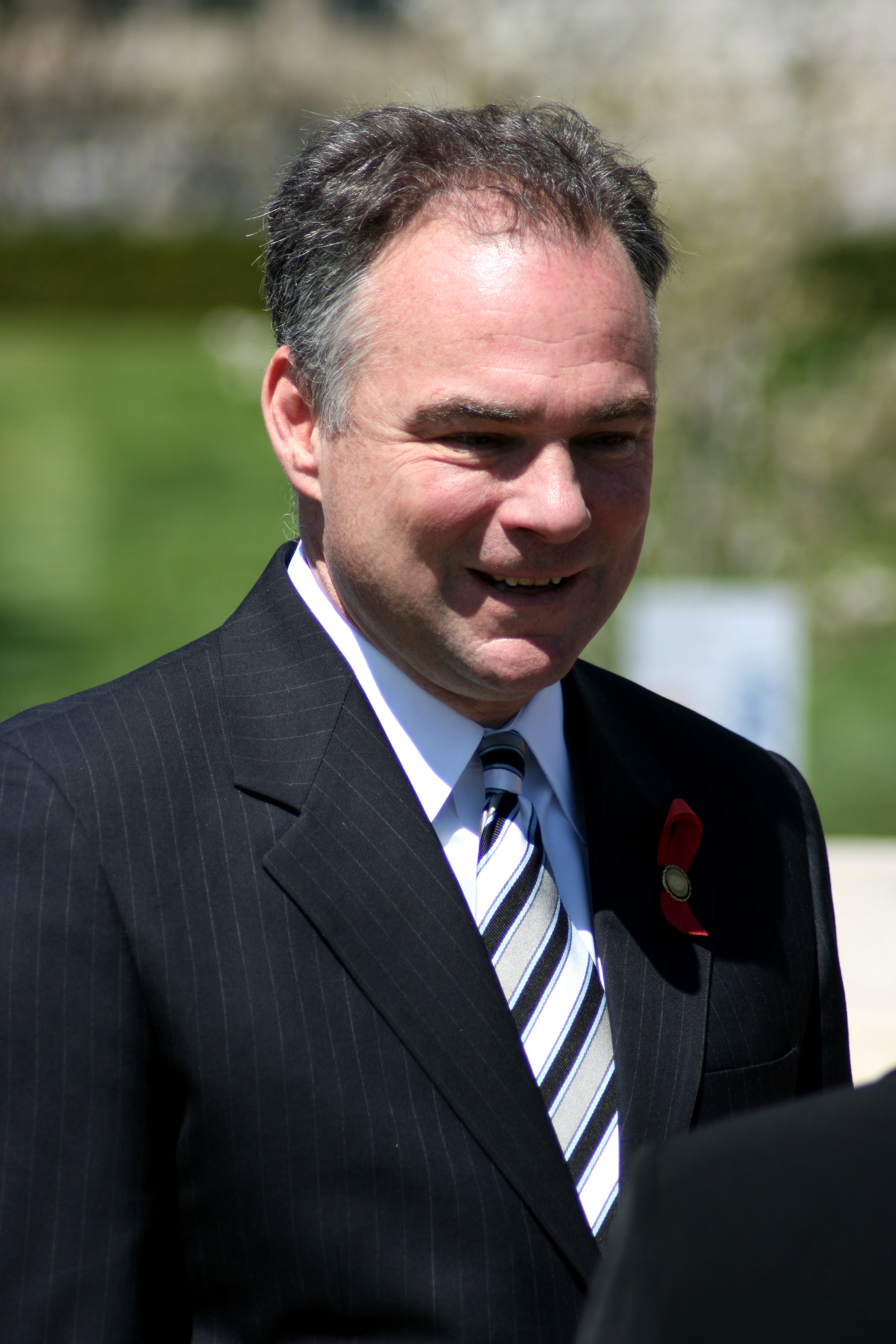
Candidate	Tim Kaine
Chair before election
Howard Dean
Elected Chair
Tim Kaine

The 2009 Democratic National Committee chairmanship election was held in Washington, D.C. on January 21, 2009, at the party's winter meeting to determine the next chairperson of the Democratic National Committee (DNC). The chair election was uncontested, and Tim Kaine was elected chairperson, succeeding Howard Dean.

== Background ==
On January 4, 2009, then President-elect Barack Obama privately told his associates that he had selected Tim Kaine as the 51st chair of the Democratic National Committee (DNC), succeeding Howard Dean. Obama held a press conference on January 8 to officially announce his endorsement of Kaine for the position.

== Results ==
Virgie Rollins made the official nomination of Kaine for DNC chair at the party's winter meeting on January 21, 2009, which was then seconded by Gilberto Hinojosa, Doris Crouse-Mays, and Mame Reiley. Howard Dean proposed the motion to suspend the rules and elect Kaine by acclamation, which was then unanimously approved, forgoing a formal ballot.

== See also ==
- 2009 Republican National Committee chairmanship election
