= American Solutions for Winning the Future =

American political committee, 2007–2011

- Formation: 2007
- Dissolved: July 2011
- Type: 527 organization
- Legal status: Not-for-profit
- Purpose: Political action committee
- Headquarters: Atlanta, Georgia
- Founder: Newt Gingrich
- Website: www.americansolutions.com

American Solutions for Winning the Future (often referred to as American Solutions) was a 527 organization created by former Speaker of the United States House of Representatives Newt Gingrich. The group first received national attention for its 2008 effort, "Drill Here. Drill Now. Pay Less", focused on the issue of offshore drilling. The organization closed in July 2011.

American Solutions was established by Gingrich in 2007. Gingrich served as chairman of the group. The group was a "fundraising juggernaut" that raised $52 million from major donors, such as Sheldon Adelson and the coal company Peabody Energy. The group promoted deregulation and increased offshore oil drilling and other fossil-fuel extraction and opposed the Employee Free Choice Act; Politico reported in 2009 that, "The operation, which includes a pollster and fundraisers, promotes Gingrich’s books, sends out direct mail, airs ads touting his causes and funds his travel across the country." American Solutions closed in 2011 after he left the organization.

== Organization ==
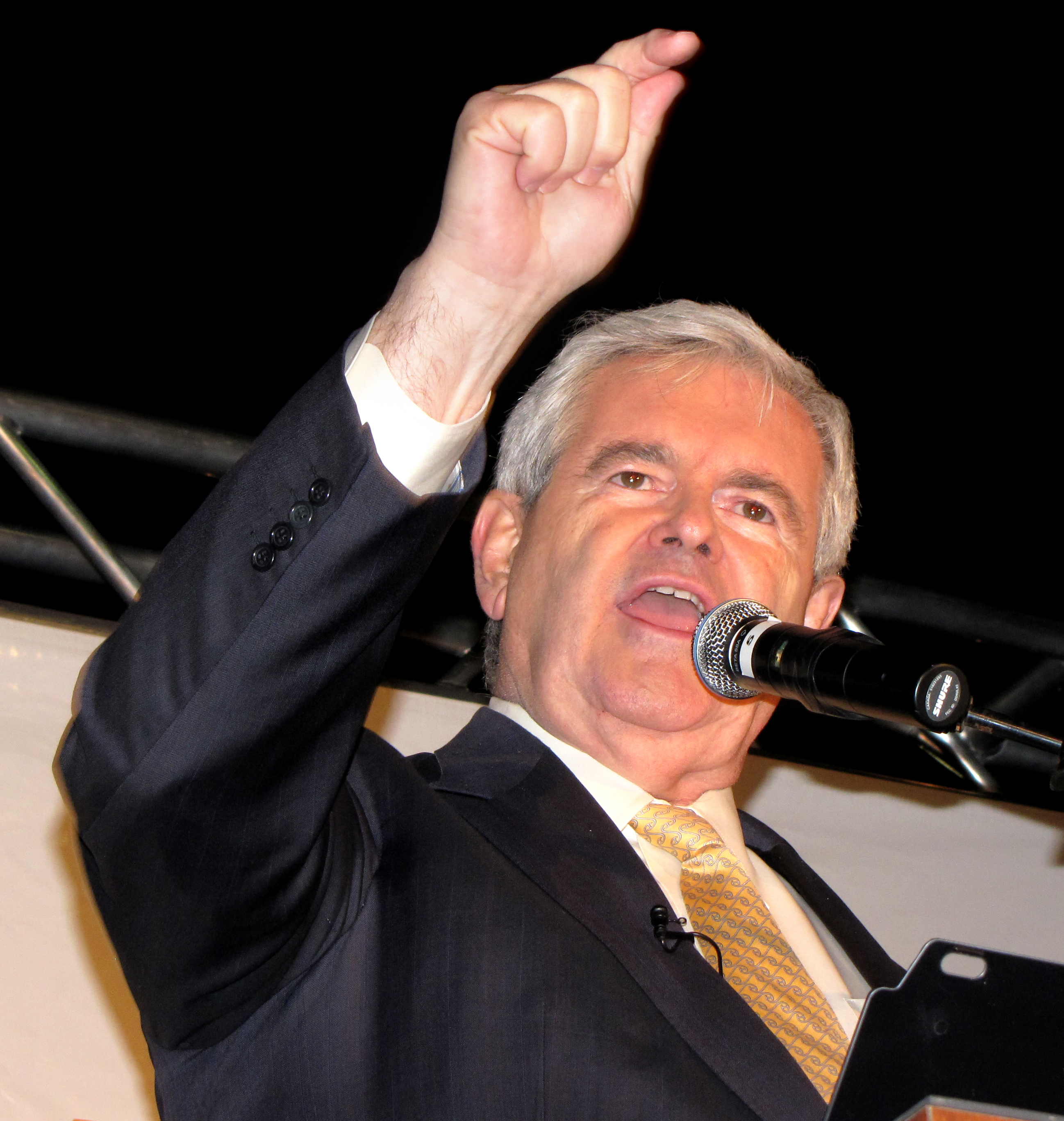
American Solutions founder Newt Gingrich speaking at the April 15, 2009 New York City Tea Party

American Solutions was officially launched with an opening presentation on September 27, 2007, before a standing-room only crowd at the Cobb Galleria Center in Atlanta, Georgia, which featured then-Governor Sonny Perdue. On September 29, 2007, American Solutions held its first "Solutions Day" with more than 2,000 workshops across the United States, designed to help volunteers learn how to get involved with government activism at the state, federal and local level. American Solutions' broad goals include transforming government "from bloated bureaucracy to lean machine."

In October 2010, American Solutions Director of Internet Strategy was named at George Washington University's PoliticsOnline conference as one of the "Top 10 Who Are Changing the World of Internet and Politics", joined by fellow winners including President Barack Obama, MTV and The Huffington Post. The same month, Politico reported American Solutions had raised more than $10 million during the 2010 year.

== Initiatives ==
"Drill Here. Drill Now." is an American political slogan coined on May 20, 2008, by former speaker of the House, Newt Gingrich and the organization to advocate for increased use of America's domestic energy resources in a bid to lower the cost of oil.

The slogan inspired the title of Gingrich's 2008 book Drill Here, Drill Now, Pay Less: A Handbook for Slashing Gas Prices and Solving Our Energy Crisis.

=== Drill Here. Drill Now. Pay Less ===
In 2008, American Solutions launched its Drill Here. Drill Now. Pay Less. campaign, which involved a television ad campaign featuring Gingrich and a petition to Congress in support of opening the Arctic National Wildlife Refuge to oil drilling, and expanded offshore drilling. The petition stated "We ... the undersigned citizens of the United States, petition the U.S. Congress to act immediately to lower gasoline prices (and diesel and other fuel prices) by authorizing the exploration of proven energy reserves to reduce our dependence on foreign energy sources from unstable countries." South Carolina Republican Party chairman Katon Dawson was the first state party chair to endorse the campaign. The petition garnered over a million names and email addresses.

=== Jobs Here. Jobs Now. Jobs First ===
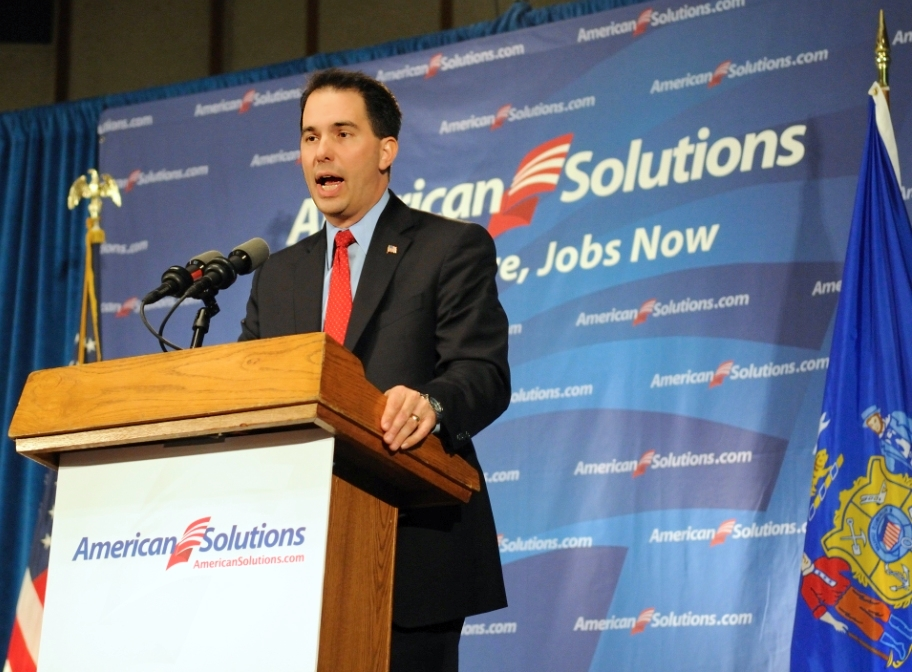
Then Milwaukee County Executive Scott Walker speaks before the Wisconsin gubernatorial election, 2010.

In August 2009, American Solutions launched its "Jobs Here. Jobs Now. Jobs First" campaign, which promoted five major tax cuts: a two-year, 50 percent reduction in payroll taxes; a 100 percent annual write-off for small businesses' new equipment purchases; a reduction in the corporate income tax to 12.5 percent (the Irish rate); elimination of the estate tax; and elimination of the capital gains tax.

=== No More Obamacare ===
On January 6, 2011, American Solutions launched NoMoreObamacare.com, a website encouraging congressional Republican lawmakers to defund and repeal the federal health care legislation passed in 2010. The site included a petition calling for the bill’s repeal as well as tools for activists. As of January 19, 2011, the petition had gathered more than 100,000 signatures.

== Dissolution ==
Gingrich left the organization when he announced his forming an exploratory committee to run for president in March 2011, as required by law. The organization was dissolved in July 2011. Joe Gaylord, who took over after Gingrich's departure, stated: "We had difficulty raising money after Newt left." During its four years it raised $52 million but spent nearly two-thirds of that on fundraising. According to an August 2011 filing with the IRS, it raised $2.4 million in the first half of 2011, but spent $2.9 million.

On September 14, 2011, the defunct organization's landlord, B.G.W. Limited Partnership, filed a complaint against American Solutions in the landlord-tenant division of District of Columbia Superior Court alleging that the organization owed $16,000 in back rent on its offices located in the same "K" Street building that houses the other Gingrich Enterprises organizations, and that the office space had neither been vacated nor the keys surrendered. American Solutions failed to enter an appearance at a court hearing held on October 6, and on October 19 Superior Court Judge A. Franklin Burgess Jr. ruled that the organization owed $20,130 in back rent and court fees and authorized the U.S. Marshals Service to evict American Solutions.
