= Maria Cino =

American civil servant and politician

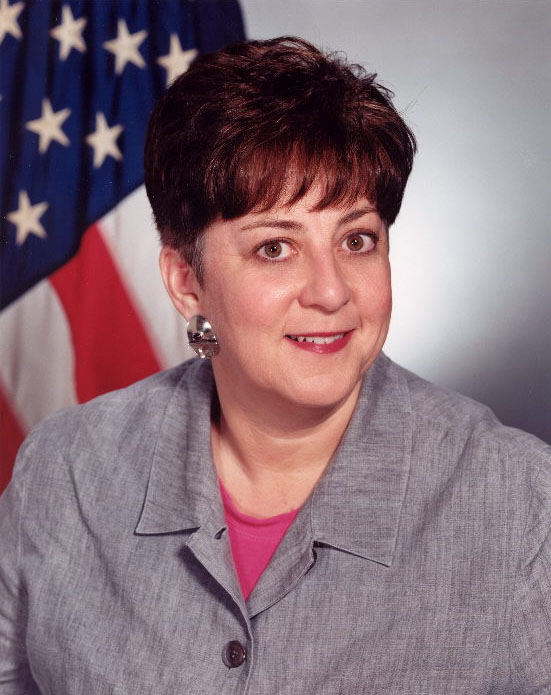

Acting United States Secretary of Transportation
- In office August 7, 2006 – October 17, 2006
- President: George W. Bush
- Preceded by: Norman Mineta
- Succeeded by: Mary Peters

8th United States Deputy Secretary of Transportation
- In office May 6, 2005 – March 3, 2007
- President: George W. Bush
- Preceded by: Michael P. Jackson
- Succeeded by: Thomas J. Barrett

Personal details
- Born: April 19, 1957 (age 69) Buffalo, New York, U.S.
- Party: Republican
- Education: St. John Fisher College (BA)

Maria Cino (born April 19, 1957) is an American public servant and political operative of the Republican Party. She served in the United States Department of Commerce and served as acting United States Secretary of Transportation during the George W. Bush administration.

== Early life ==
Cino was born in Buffalo, New York on April 19, 1957. She grew up in Buffalo in an "Italian Catholic Democratic union household". Cino is a graduate of St. John Fisher College in Rochester, New York.

== Career ==
Cino served as Chief of Staff from 1989-1993, for U.S. Representative Bill Paxon.

From 1993 to 1997, Cino served as the executive director of the National Republican Congressional Committee, she played a key role in orchestrating the 1994 and 1996 elections—returning Republican control to the U.S. House of Representatives for the first time in 40 years and retaining the majority in 1996, for the first consecutive time in 68 years.

She helped lead the Republican Party to congressional victories in the 1994 election cycle.

In 1999 and 2000, Cino served as National Political Director for the presidential campaign of George W. Bush. She was also the Republican Nation Committee Deputy Chair for political and congressional relations in 2000, and she served as RNC Deputy Chair in 2003 and 2004.

=== United States Department of Commerce ===
President George W. Bush appointed Cino to serve as Assistant Secretary and Director General of the U.S. Foreign Commercial Service; in that capacity, "she supervised 1,700 employees and had a budget of $200 million".

=== United States Department of Transportation ===
Cino was nominated by President George W. Bush as the Deputy Secretary of Transportation on April 6, 2005, and was confirmed by the United States Senate on May 11, 2005. As Deputy Secretary, she managing a $61 billion budget and 60,000 employees across 10 agencies. In 2005, Cino was award the Department of Transportation Gold Medal for her outstanding leadership and distinguished contributions during Hurricane Katrina. During her time at DOT, she led the development of the National Strategy to Reduce Transportation Congestion and served on the National Surface Transportation Policy and Revenue Study Commission.

After Norman Mineta's departure in July 2006, Cino served as Acting United States Secretary of Transportation for a short time. Mary Peters was sworn in as Mineta's successor on September 30, 2006.

=== Later work ===
Cino served as president and chief executive officer of the 2008 Republican National Convention (National Republican Convention) in Minneapolis-Saint Paul. She managing the organization's strategy, budget and daily operations, producing a four-day event for over 45,000 attendees with a $125 million budget. The Associated Press praised the event as “a model of efficiency and organization.”

In December 2010, Cino announced her candidacy for chair of the Republican National Committee in the RNC's January 2011 election. The contest was won by Reince Priebus, and Cino finished third out of a field of 7 candidates.

In 2012, Cino was appointed as Vice President of Americas and U.S. Government Relations for Hewlett Packard Enterprise. From 2013 to 2022, Cino was named to The Hill's Top 100 Lobbyists list.

=== Board memberships ===
Cino has served as a board members of The WISH List and VIEW PAC committed to increasing the numbers of Republican women holding office. She also served on the Board of The Women's Campaign School at Yale, training campaign staff.

Political offices
Preceded by Norman Mineta	United States Secretary of Transportation; Acting; 2006	Succeeded by Mary Peters
