= Ken Blackwell =

American politician and activist

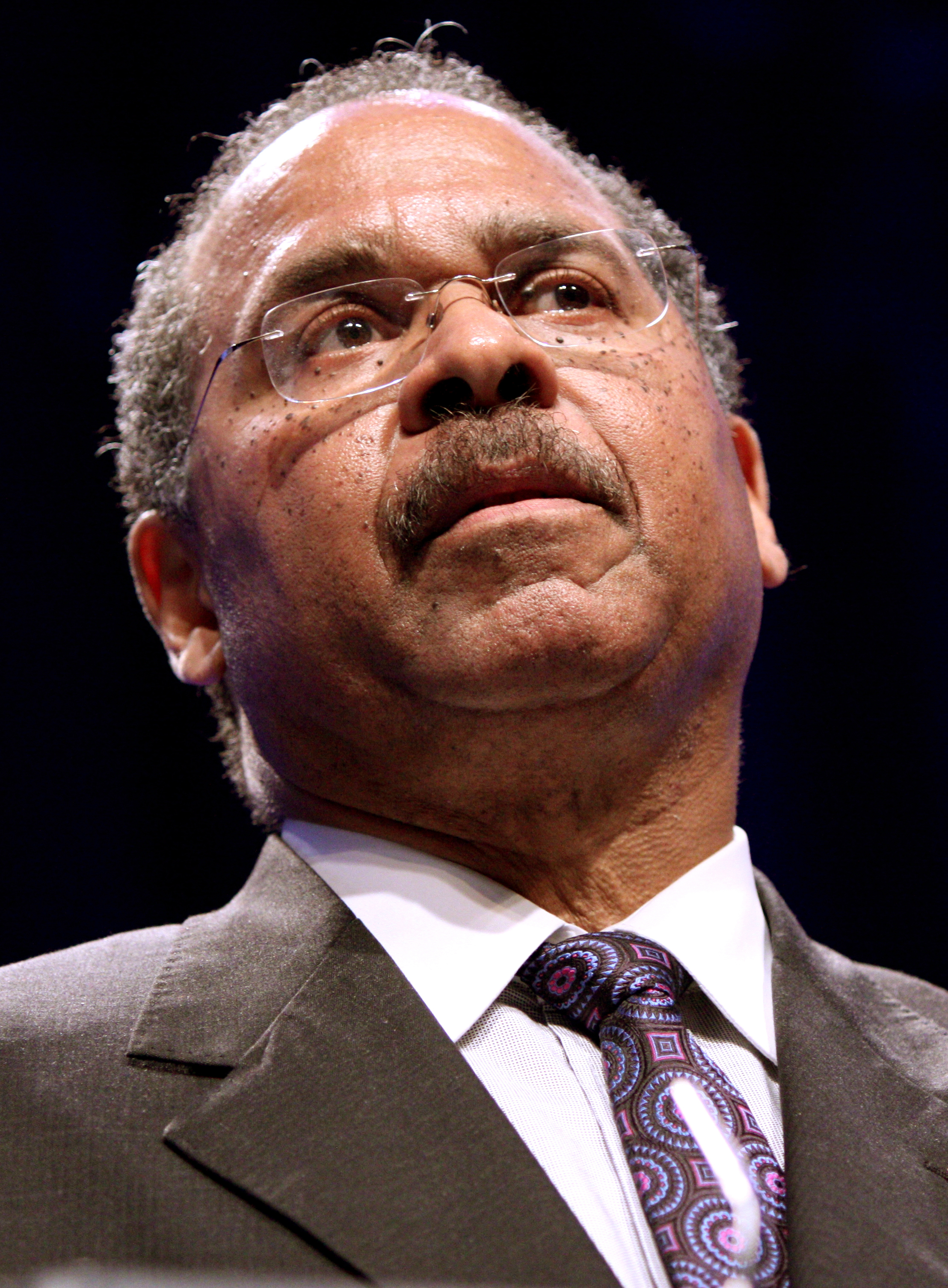
- Blackwell in 2011

48th Secretary of State of Ohio
- In office January 8, 1999 – January 8, 2007
- Governor: Nancy Hollister; Bob Taft
- Preceded by: Bob Taft
- Succeeded by: Jennifer Brunner

43rd Treasurer of Ohio
- In office March 1, 1994 – January 8, 1999
- Governor: George Voinovich; Nancy Hollister
- Preceded by: Mary Ellen Withrow
- Succeeded by: Joe Deters

Mayor of Cincinnati
- In office 1979–1980
- Preceded by: Bobbie Sterne
- Succeeded by: David Mann

Personal details
- Born: John Kenneth Blackwell; February 28, 1948 (age 78) Alliance, Ohio, U.S.
- Party: Republican
- Education: Xavier University (BS, MEd)

John Kenneth Blackwell (born February 28, 1948) is an American politician, author, and conservative activist who served as the mayor of Cincinnati, Ohio (1979–1980), the Ohio state treasurer (1994–1999), and Ohio secretary of state (1999–2007). He was the Republican candidate for governor of Ohio in 2006, the first African American major-party candidate for governor of Ohio. He is a senior fellow at the Family Research Council. He is vice president of the executive committee of the Council For National Policy and is a member of the Council on Foreign Relations.

== Early life and education ==
Blackwell was born in Alliance, Ohio, the son of Dana, a part-time nurse, and George Blackwell, a meat packer. He has two brothers, Carl and Charles. He married his wife, Rosa, in 1969 while he was in college. They have three children. Blackwell is the nephew of Olympic long-jumper DeHart Hubbard, who was the first Black athlete to win a gold medal in an individual Olympic event, jumping more than 24 feet at the 1924 Paris Olympics.

Blackwell grew up in the Avondale and West End neighborhoods in Cincinnati. He attended Samuel Ach Junior High School and graduated from Hughes High School, where he met his future wife.

Blackwell attended Xavier University in Cincinnati on a football scholarship. He received a Bachelor of Science degree in psychology from Xavier in 1970 and his Master of Education degree, also from Xavier, in 1971. After college, he was invited to the Dallas Cowboys' training camp; he gave up football when told he would have to convert from linebacker to offensive lineman. He taught at Xavier from 1974 to 1991.

He has served as a trustee of Wilberforce University and Wilmington College. On April 25, 1987, Blackwell was made a Mason-on-Sight by Grand Master Odes J. Kyle Jr. of the Most Worshipful Prince Hall Grand Lodge of Ohio; thereby making him a Prince Hall Freemason. This African-American branch of Freemasonry was founded in the 19th century.

== Early political career ==
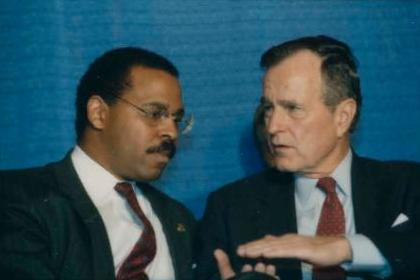
Blackwell with President George H. W. Bush in 1990

Blackwell became involved in politics through the Charter Committee, Cincinnati's third party. He was subsequently elected to and served on the Cincinnati city council. In 1978, he was elected as the mayor of Cincinnati, serving into 1980. One of his first priorities was to establish a crowd control task force, to study better methods of crowd control and injury prevention. This was in response to the deaths of 11 concert fans at a concert by the British rock group The Who at Riverfront Coliseum on December 3, 1979.

When Blackwell began to consider statewide and national offices, he became a Republican. He was appointed to serve in the administration of President George H. W. Bush as undersecretary in the Department of Housing and Urban Development, a position he held from 1989 to 1990. He returned to Cincinnati to run for the first district seat in the United States House of Representatives which was being vacated by Tom Luken. Blackwell lost to Luken's son, Charlie Luken, by a narrow 51% to 49% margin. Following his close defeat, Blackwell was appointed by President Bush as U.S. ambassador to the United Nations Commission on Human Rights. Blackwell served in that post from 1992 to 1993.

In 1994, Governor George Voinovich appointed Blackwell as Ohio state treasurer to complete the term of Mary Ellen Withrow. She had been appointed as Treasurer of the United States by President Bill Clinton. Blackwell was elected treasurer in 1994.

== Ohio secretary of state (1999–2007) ==
Blackwell was elected Ohio secretary of state in 1998. Blackwell was national chairman of longtime friend Steve Forbes' presidential campaign in 2000. Blackwell was re-elected secretary of state in 2002.

As Ohio's secretary of state and chief elections officer during the 2004 presidential election, Blackwell also served as an honorary co-chair of President George W. Bush's campaign. On December 27, 2004, Blackwell requested a court order to protect him from being interviewed in the Moss v. Bush case, a challenge of the presidential vote. He fought a subpoena, arguing that the litigation was frivolous.

Blackwell's office twice accidentally exposed the Social Security numbers of Ohio citizens: first in March 2006, when 1.2 million numbers were published online alongside business filings, prompting a class-action lawsuit that was settled after the data was removed and safeguards were put in place; and again in April 2006, when computer disks containing the names, addresses, and Social Security numbers of 5.7 million registered voters were inadvertently mailed out under a routine Freedom of Information Act release. The second incident triggered an investigation by Republican Attorney General Jim Petro, who pledged "maximum due diligence" to ensure the data had not been copied before being returned.

Ohio state senator Jeff Jacobson asked Blackwell in July 2003 to disqualify Diebold Election Systems' bid to supply voting machines for the state after security problems were discovered in its software. On April 4, 2006, the Columbus Dispatch reported that Blackwell "owned stock [83 shares, down from 178 shares purchased in January 2005] in Diebold, a voting-machine [and ATM] manufacturer. After discovering the stock ownership, Blackwell promptly sold the shares at a loss." He attributed the purchase to an unidentified financial manager at Credit Suisse First Boston who he said had, without his knowledge, violated his instructions to avoid potential conflict of interest. When Cuyahoga County's primary was held on May 2, 2006, officials ordered the hand-counting of more than 18,000 paper ballots after Diebold's new optical scan machines produced inconsistent tabulations. Blackwell ordered an investigation by the Cuyahoga County Board of Elections.

== 2006 Ohio gubernatorial campaign ==
=== Primary election ===
Blackwell won the Republican primary on May 2, 2006, against Ohio attorney general Jim Petro with 56% of the vote. The run up to the primaries was dominated by strongly critical television ads that Blackwell and his opponent Jim Petro ran against one another. Blackwell was criticized by Petro for declining to engage in three planned debates which had been organized by the Dayton Daily News and the City Club of Cleveland. According to The Columbus Dispatch, "Blackwell said he has 'shared plenty of forums' with Petro and that he wants to focus on talking to Republicans in the final days of the campaign."

On April 29, the Hamilton County Democrats publicly demanded that Blackwell pull radio ads which urged unregistered Democrats to ask for Republican primary ballots on May 2, 2006, rather than issues-only ballots. The Democrats argued that the ads are using "illegal and unethical political tactics."

During the primary, Blackwell led the Republican candidates in fundraising. He raised $1.09 million between January 31, 2006, and April 12, 2006, from approximately 12,000 individuals and businesses.

=== General election ===
Blackwell's opponents in the general election were Democratic U.S. Representative Ted Strickland, Libertarian nominee and professor emeritus Bill Peirce, and Green Party nominee Bob Fitrakis. Blackwell chose Ohio state representative Tom Raga to be his running mate. Blackwell was the first African American to be nominated by a major political party as a candidate for the Ohio governorship. After winning their respective primaries, both Blackwell and Strickland were able to raise record sums, in part because of the national attention paid to the race. As of September 9, 2006, Strickland led Blackwell, $11.2 million to $10 million. On November 7, 2006, Strickland defeated Blackwell by a 24% margin.

There had been increased national attention on the ability of the Republican Party to maintain control in Ohio. On a national level, The New York Times suggested that the results of the election would be a bellwether for the 2008 U.S. presidential election. According to a broad survey reported by The Plain Dealer on April 30, 2006, Ohio voters would "prefer to see a Democrat occupy the governor's mansion." John Stemberger, president and general counsel for the Florida Family Policy Council, however, was quoted as saying that Blackwell could "potentially be president of the United States someday, and the first black president at that."

== Later career ==
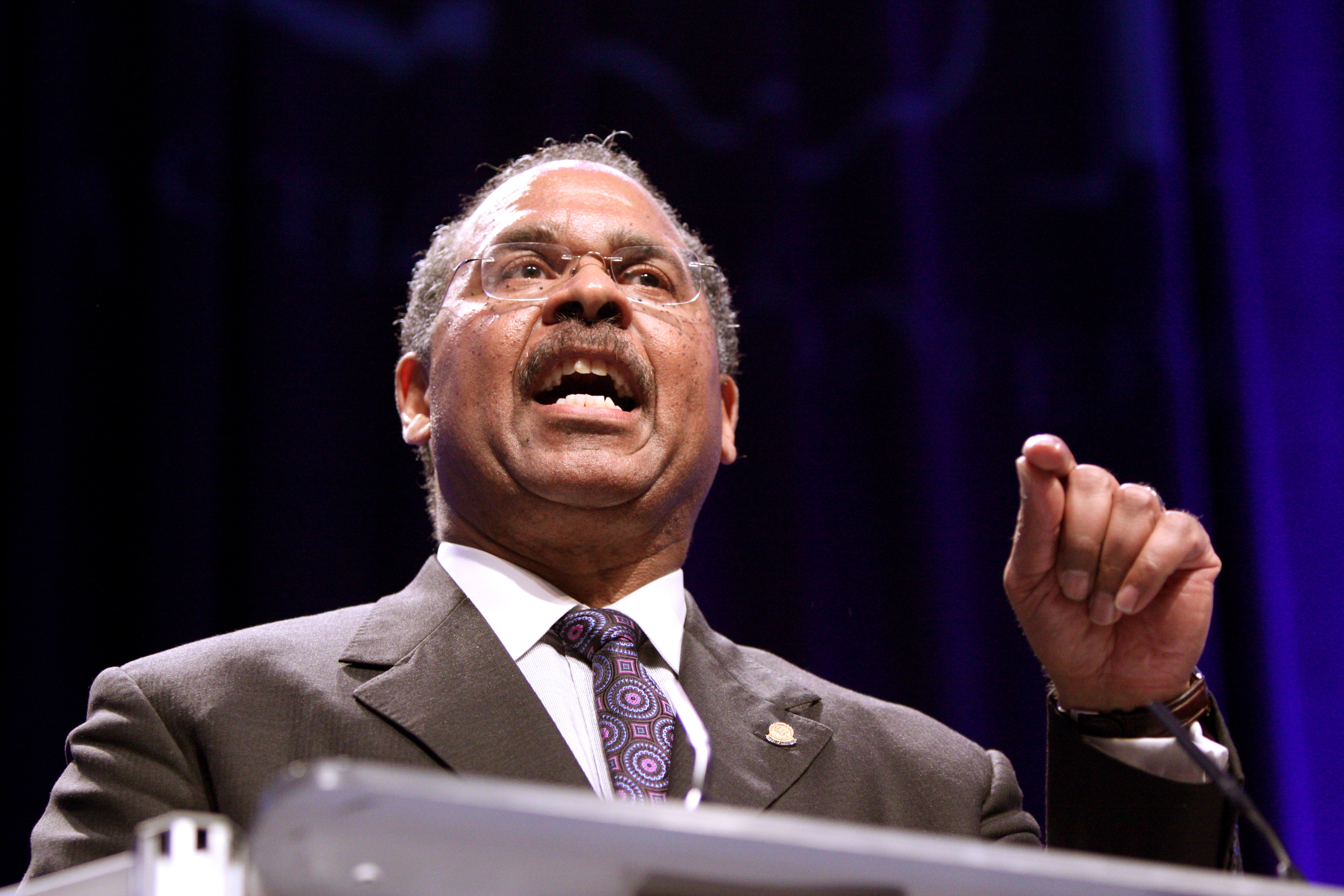
Blackwell speaking at the 2011 Conservative Political Action Conference

Blackwell is a member of the Council for National Policy and as of 2022 was vice president of the group's executive committee.

On May 14, 2007, Blackwell was appointed a senior fellow at the Family Research Council, a conservative group. In October 2011, the National Federation of Republican Assemblies elected Blackwell their executive vice president; Blackwell was re-elected in September 2013. The Family Research Council identified Blackwell as a senior fellow for family empowerment in 2012. As of 2015, he was a member of the National Rifle Association's board of directors.

During the first presidential transition of Donald Trump, Blackwell led appointment selections for positions involving domestic issues.

=== 2009 RNC chairmanship election ===
Blackwell announced his intentions to run in the 2009 RNC chairmanship election, but withdrew after the 4th round of voting. He won early endorsement from the state chairmen in Louisiana (Roger F. Villere Jr.), Texas (Tina Benkiser), and Oklahoma (Gary Jones).

RNC chairman vote Source: CQPolitics and Poll Pundit

Candidate	Round 1	Round 2	Round 3	Round 4	Round 5	Round 6
Michael Steele	46	48	51	60	79	91
Katon Dawson	28	29	34	62	69	77
Saul Anuzis	22	24	24	31	20	Withdrew
Ken Blackwell	20	19	15	15	Withdrew	
Mike Duncan	52	48	44	Withdrew		

Candidate won that Round of voting
Candidate withdrew
Candidate won RNC Chairmanship

== Bibliography ==
- Rebuilding America: A Prescription for Creating Strong Families, Building the Wealth of Working People, and Ending Welfare. WND Books, 2006. ISBN 1-58182-501-3 (with Jerome R. Corsi)
- The Blueprint: Obama's Plan to Subvert the Constitution and Build an Imperial Presidency. Lyons Press, 2010. ISBN 0-7627-6134-2 (with Ken Klukowski)

== See also ==
- Ohio's 1st congressional district
- List of African-American Republicans

Political offices
Preceded by Bobbie Sterne	Mayor of Cincinnati; 1979–1980	Succeeded by David Mann
Preceded by Mary Ellen Withrow	Treasurer of Ohio; 1994–1999	Succeeded by Joe Deters
Preceded by Bob Taft	Secretary of State of Ohio; 1999–2007	Succeeded by Jennifer Brunner
Party political offices
Preceded by Judith Y. Brachman	Republican nominee for Ohio State Treasurer; 1994	Succeeded by Joe Deters
Preceded by Bob Taft	Republican nominee for Ohio Secretary of State; 1998, 2002	Succeeded by Greg Hartmann
Preceded by Bob Taft	Republican nominee for Governor of Ohio; 2006	Succeeded by John Kasich
