= Michael Steele =

American politician (born 1958)

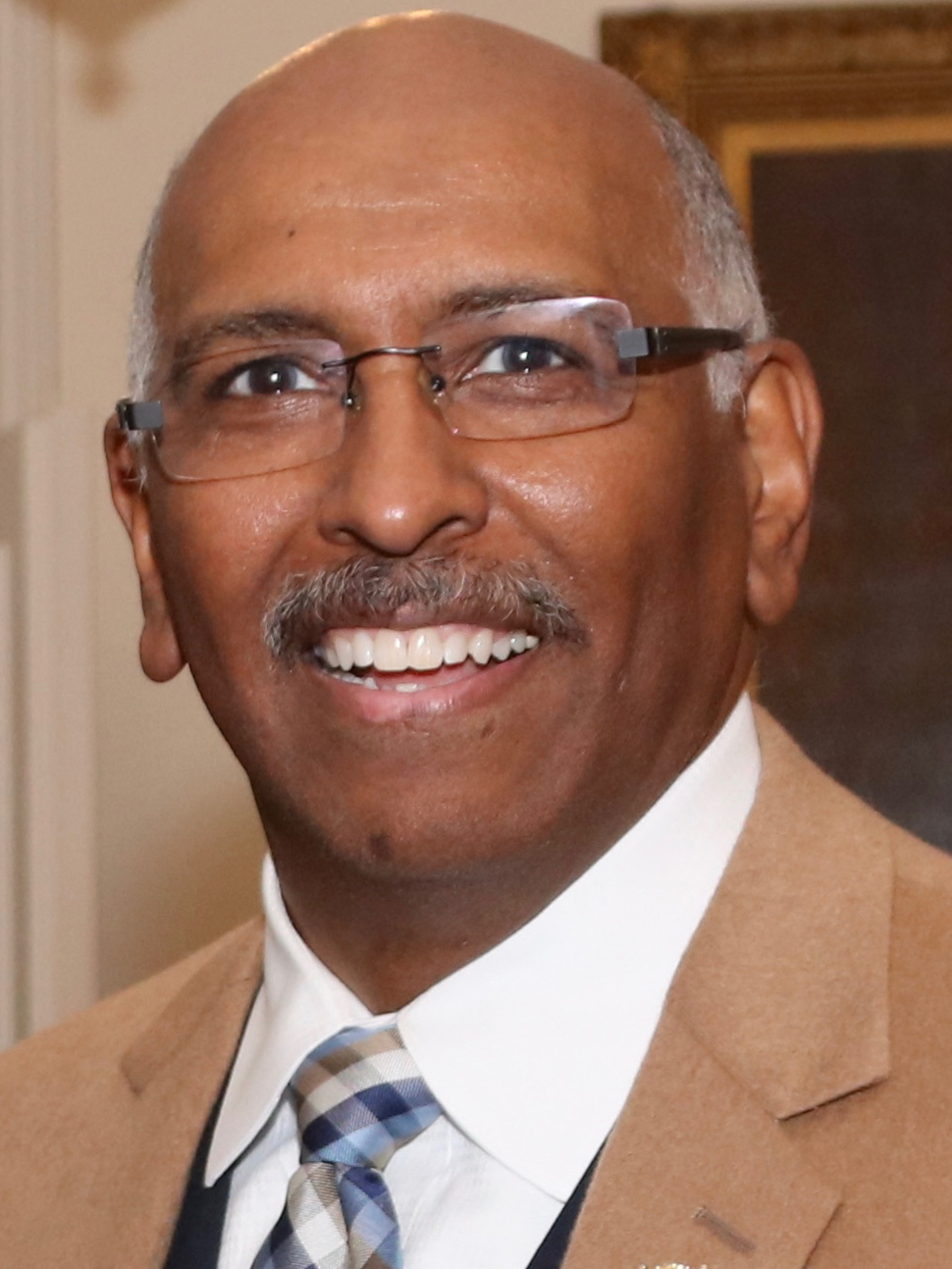
- Steele in 2019

Chair of the Republican National Committee
- In office January 30, 2009 – January 14, 2011
- Preceded by: Mike Duncan
- Succeeded by: Reince Priebus

7th Lieutenant Governor of Maryland
- In office January 15, 2003 – January 17, 2007
- Governor: Bob Ehrlich
- Preceded by: Kathleen Kennedy Townsend
- Succeeded by: Anthony Brown

Chair of the Maryland Republican Party
- In office December 10, 2000 – July 1, 2002
- Preceded by: Joyce Lyon Tehres
- Succeeded by: Louis Pope

Personal details
- Born: October 19, 1958 (age 68) Andrews Field, Maryland, U.S.
- Party: Republican
- Spouse: Andrea Derritt (m. 1985)
- Children: 2
- Education: Johns Hopkins University (BA); Villanova University (attended); Georgetown University (JD)

Michael Stephen Steele (born October 19, 1958) is an American politician, attorney, and political commentator who served as the seventh lieutenant governor of Maryland from 2003 to 2007 and as chair of the Republican National Committee (RNC) from 2009 until 2011; he was the first African-American to hold either office.

In the 1990s, Steele worked as a partner at the international law firm of LeBoeuf, Lamb, Greene & MacRae and co-founded the Republican Leadership Council, a "fiscally conservative and socially inclusive" political action committee. Steele also made numerous appearances as a political pundit on Fox News and other media outlets prior to running for public office. As lieutenant governor, Steele chaired the Minority Business Enterprise task force, actively promoting an expansion of affirmative action in the corporate world.

Steele made an unsuccessful run in the 2006 U.S. Senate election in Maryland, losing to Democrat Ben Cardin. From 2007 to 2009, Steele was chairman of GOPAC, a 527 organization that trains and supports Republican candidates in state and local elections. After serving one term as RNC Chair from 2009 to 2011, he lost his bid for a second term and was succeeded by Reince Priebus.

Since 2011, Steele has contributed as a regular columnist for online magazine The Root and as a political analyst for MS NOW, where he began co-hosting the prime time program The Weeknight in 2025. In 2018, he became a Senior Fellow at Brown University's Watson Institute for International and Public Affairs. In 2020, he formally endorsed Joe Biden for the presidency, after previously starring in an advertisement aired by The Lincoln Project.

== Early life and education ==
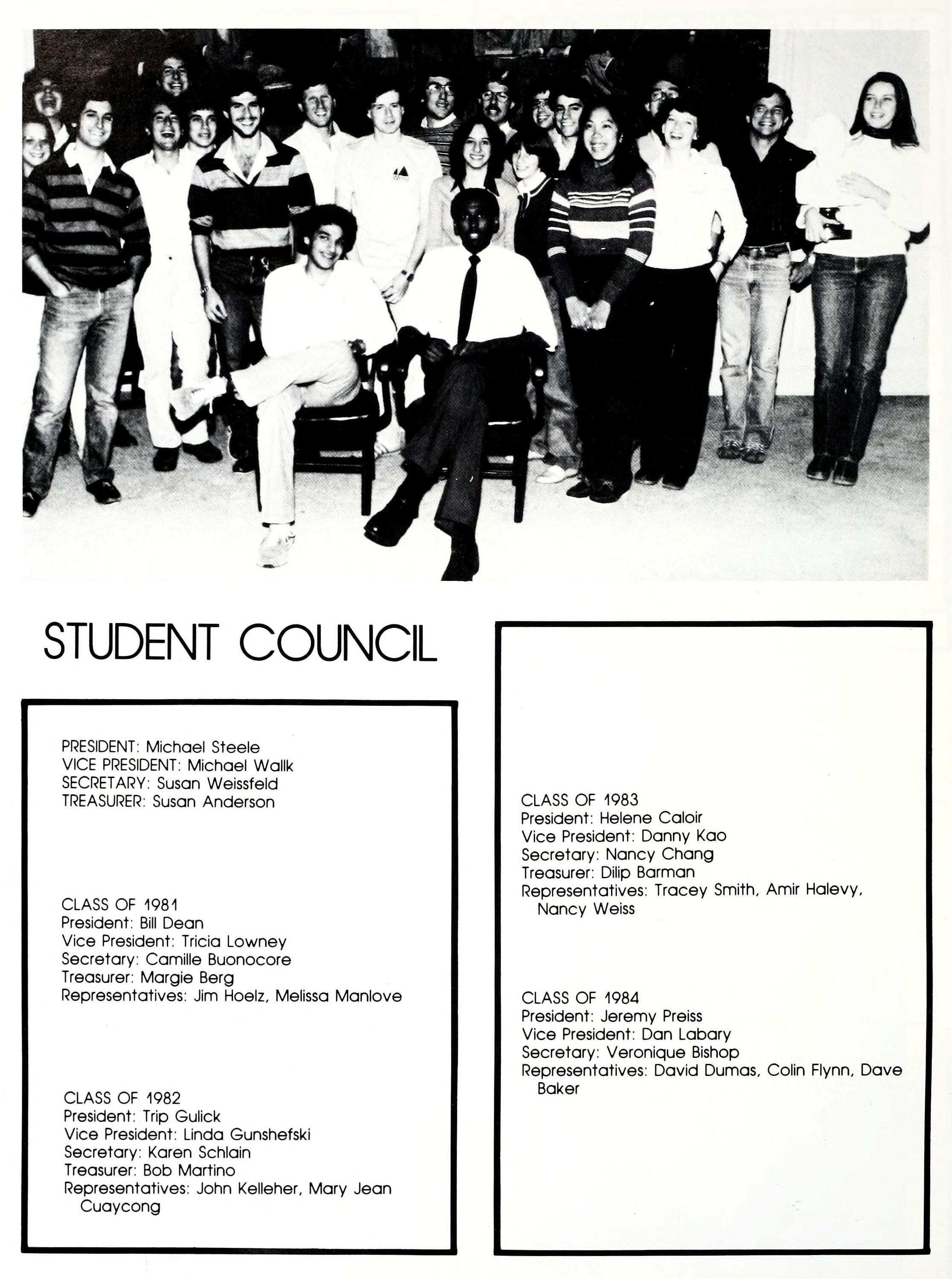
Steele in the Johns Hopkins University yearbook, 1981

Steele was born on October 19, 1958, at Andrews Air Force Base in Prince George's County, Maryland, and was adopted as an infant by William and Maebell Steele. His father died in 1962. His mother, who had been born into a sharecropping family in South Carolina, worked for minimum wage as a laundress to raise her children. After Steele's father died, she ignored her friends' appeals to apply for public assistance, later telling Steele, "I didn't want the government raising my children." She later married John Turner, a truck driver. Michael and his sister, Monica Turner, were raised in the Petworth neighborhood of Northwest, Washington, D.C., which Steele has described as a small, stable and racially integrated community that insulated him from some of the problems elsewhere in the city. Steele's sister later married and divorced former heavyweight boxing champion Mike Tyson.

Steele attended Archbishop Carroll High School in Washington, D.C., participating in the glee club, the National Honor Society and many of the school's drama productions. During his senior year, he was elected student council president. In 1981, Steele received a BA degree in international studies from the Johns Hopkins University in Baltimore City, Maryland.

After graduating from Hopkins, Steele worked for one year as a high school teacher at Malvern Preparatory School in Pennsylvania, teaching classes in world history and economics. He spent three years preparing for the Catholic priesthood at the Augustinian Friars Seminary at Villanova University, which he left prior to ordination to enter civil service.

Steele subsequently attended Georgetown Law School where he graduated with a JD degree in 1991. He failed the Maryland bar exam, but passed the Pennsylvania exam. From 1991 to 1997, Steele worked in Washington, D.C., as a corporate securities associate for the Cleary, Gottlieb, Steen & Hamilton international law firm, where he specialized in financial investments for Wall Street underwriters. He left the firm to found the Steele Group, a business and legal consulting firm.

== Political development ==
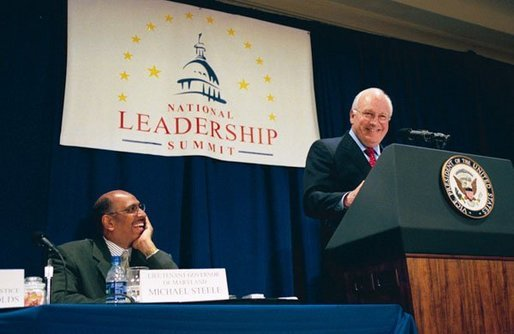
Steele listens during then-Vice President Dick Cheney's address at the Second Annual African American Leadership Summit in Washington, D.C., Wednesday, April 28, 2004.

After joining the Republican Party, Steele became chairman of the Prince George's County Republican Central Committee. He was a founding member of the centrist, fiscally conservative and socially inclusive Republican Leadership Council in 1993 but left in 2008, citing disagreements over endorsing primary candidates. In 1995, the Maryland Republican Party selected him as their Republican Man of the Year. He worked on several political campaigns, was an alternate delegate to the 1996 Republican National Convention and a delegate to the 2000 Republican National Convention. Steele's Maryland biography identifies him as a member of the Tau Epsilon Phi fraternity. In December 2000, he was elected chairman of the Maryland Republican Party, becoming the first African-American ever to be elected chairman of any state Republican Party.

== Lieutenant Governor of Maryland ==
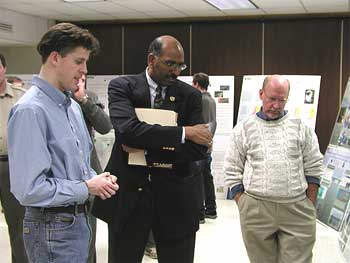
Steele watches a video and discusses Seaduck Research with Edward Lohnes (left) and Dr. Matthew C Perry (right)

In 2002, Robert Ehrlich, who was running for Maryland governor, selected Steele as his running mate for lieutenant governor. The campaign was waged against Democrat Kathleen Kennedy Townsend, who was running for governor, and Charles R. Larson who was running for lieutenant governor.

In the September primary election, Ehrlich and Steele had no serious opposition. In the November 2002 general election, the Republican Ehrlich-Steele ticket won, 51 percent to 48 percent, even though Maryland traditionally votes Democratic and had not elected a Republican Governor in almost 40 years. The Townsend-Larson campaign had been tainted by outgoing Democratic governor Parris Glendening's marital problems and backlash due to his strict enforcement of environmental regulations.

Steele's most prominent efforts for the Ehrlich administration were reforming the state's Minority Business Enterprise program and chairing the Governor's Commission on Quality Education in Maryland. Steele garnered criticism for his failure to oppose Ehrlich's reinstitution of the death penalty, despite claims of racial inequities in the use of the death penalty, Steele's own religious beliefs and his prior anti-death penalty pronouncements. In 2005, Steele was named an Aspen Institute Rodel Fellow in Public Leadership and was awarded the Bethune-DuBois Institute Award for his continuing efforts to improve the quality education in Maryland.

At the 2004 Republican National Convention, Steele gave the Republican counterpoint to Barack Obama's 2004 Democratic National Convention keynote address; it was Steele's first major national exposure. In April 2005, President Bush chose him to be a member of the U.S. delegation at the investiture of Pope Benedict XVI in Vatican City.

== 2006 campaign for U.S. Senate ==
When Paul Sarbanes, Maryland's longest-serving United States Senator, announced in March 2005 that he would not be a candidate for re-election in 2006, top state and national Republican officials began pressing Steele to become their party's nominee for the seat. In April 2005, The Baltimore Sun announced the results of a poll it conducted, stating that Steele would run statistically neck and neck against either former NAACP head Kweisi Mfume, or Rep. Benjamin L. Cardin of Baltimore County. Steele formally announced his candidacy for the U.S. Senate on October 25, 2005.

Steele won the Republican nomination after facing little opposition in the primary. His opponents were Democrat Ben Cardin and Independent Kevin Zeese (who was endorsed by the Green and Libertarian parties). The three candidates participated in three debates. Cardin primarily attacked Steele over his close relations with President Bush. Steele focused on low taxes, less government spending, free markets and national security. Steele lost the general election to Cardin on November 7, 2006, 44% to Cardin's 54%. Steele's former campaign finance chairman later alleged improprieties in Steele's handling of campaign funds, which Steele denied.

== After the Senate race ==
One day after Steele conceded defeat in the senate election, Chris Cillizza of The Washington Post reported that Steele was hoping to succeed Ken Mehlman as the chairman of the Republican National Committee. Senator Mel Martinez of Florida, who had the endorsement of President George W. Bush, got the position. In February 2007, Steele became chairman of GOPAC, a political action committee that helps fund state and local Republican campaigns around the country and is responsible for training future Republican candidates. He succeeded former U.S. Congressman J.C. Watts, a fellow black Republican. In April 2007, Steele joined the international law firm of Dewey & LeBoeuf, as a partner in the firm's Washington, D.C. office.

At a speech given at the Media Research Center's 2007 DisHonors Awards Gala, Steele said:

I get a question all the time, 'Are you going to run again for office?' And I've thought about that, and I've come to realize that there's still some Democrats out there that I haven't ticked off yet. So, yeah, we're gonna do it again. We're gonna do it again, and all I have to say is, they haven't seen anything yet.

Steele is considered a possible candidate for Governor of Maryland in the future and said he was "intrigued by the idea" for 2010. He said that he would not run for president in 2012.

Steele appeared several times on HBO's political show Real Time with Bill Maher, and was on Comedy Central's talk show The Colbert Report on January 23, 2007. He also hosted a PBS Republican Primary debate in Baltimore, Maryland on September 27, 2007. He coined the phrase "Drill Baby Drill" during the 2008 Republican National Convention in Minnesota, where he promoted offshore drilling as an alternative to dependency on foreign oil.

== RNC chairman ==
=== 2009 election ===
On November 24, 2008, Steele kicked off his campaign for the RNC chairmanship by launching his website. On January 30, 2009, Steele won the chairmanship of the RNC in the sixth round, with 91 votes to Katon Dawson's 77. Steele, the RNC's first African American chairman, was selected in the aftermath of President Obama's election; many in the GOP saw him as a charismatic counter to the nation's first Black president.

Source: CQPolitics and Poll Pundit

Candidate	Round 1	Round 2	Round 3	Round 4	Round 5	Round 6
Michael Steele	46	48	51	60	79	91
Katon Dawson	28	29	34	62	69	77
Saul Anuzis	22	24	24	31	20	Withdrew
Ken Blackwell	20	19	15	15	Withdrew	
Mike Duncan	52	48	44	Withdrew		

Candidate won that Round of voting
Candidate withdrew
Candidate won RNC Chairmanship

=== Leadership dispute with Rush Limbaugh ===
On March 1, 2009, in response to a question on CBS's Face the Nation as to who spoke for the Republican Party, White House Chief of Staff Rahm Emanuel opined that Rush Limbaugh spoke for the Party; Emanuel asserted that "whenever a Republican criticizes [Limbaugh], they have to run back and apologize to him, and say they were misunderstood. He is the voice and the intellectual force and energy behind the Republican Party. And he has been upfront about what he views, and hasn't stepped back from that, which is he hopes for [President Obama's] failure. He said it. And I compliment him for his honesty, but that's their philosophy that is enunciated by Rush Limbaugh."

In remarks aired by the CNN program D.L. Hughley Breaks the News on March 1, 2009, Steele said he, rather than Limbaugh, was "the de facto leader of the Republican Party. Rush Limbaugh is an entertainer. Rush Limbaugh's whole thing is entertainment. Yes, it is incendiary. Yes, it is ugly." On March 2, 2009, Limbaugh said on his radio show that Steele was not fit to lead the Republican Party, asking why Steele claimed "to lead the Republican Party when [he seemed] obsessed with seeing to it President Obama succeeds?" After the show, Steele called Limbaugh to apologize, saying "I have enormous respect for Rush Limbaugh. I was maybe a little bit inarticulate. There was no attempt on my part to diminish his voice or his leadership. I went back at that tape and I realized words that I said weren't what I was thinking. It was one of those things where I thinking I was saying one thing, and it came out differently. What I was trying to say was a lot of people want to make Rush the scapegoat, the bogeyman, and he's not." Steele later issued another statement to say that Limbaugh "is a national conservative leader, and in no way do I want to diminish his voice. I truly apologize."

=== Fire Pelosi Bus Tour ===
In the fall of 2010, Steele launched the "Fire Pelosi Bus Tour", with the goal of "firing" Speaker Pelosi from her position as Speaker of the House of Representatives by re-establishing a Republican majority in the United States House of Representatives. The tour began on September 15 and lasted six weeks, visiting 48 states in the Continental U.S. and more than 100 cities while covering 14,000 miles. The Tour's purpose was to "encourage votes for Republicans in districts across the nation". The stops in individual districts gave Steele, "known for his bomb-throwing speaking style", an opportunity to fire up local GOP activists. During the tour, "Steele urged party unity" as the Republicans attempted to take over the House of Representatives and end Representative Pelosi's tenure as Speaker of the House.

The RNC broke fundraising records by raising over $198 million during the 2010 congressional cycle; in November 2010, Republicans won 63 House seats (the biggest pickup since 1938) and retook control of the House. The 2010 midterm elections were successful for Steele and the Republicans, as they also took back six Senate seats, seven governorships, and the greatest share of state legislative seats since 1928 (over 600 seats).

=== 2011 election ===
In December 2010, Steele declared that he would run for re-election as RNC chairman. The 2011 Republican National Committee (RNC) chairmanship election was held on January 14, 2011. Steele withdrew from the race after the fourth ballot, urging his supporters to vote for Maria Cino. After seven rounds of balloting, Reince Priebus was elected over Steele, Saul Anuzis, Ann Wagner and Maria Cino.

Candidate	Round 1	Round 2	Round 3	Round 4	Round 5	Round 6	Round 7
Reince Priebus	45	52	54	58	67	80	97
Saul Anuzis	24	22	21	24	32	37	43
Maria Cino	32	30	28	29	40	34	28
Ann Wagner	23	27	32	28	28	17	Withdrew
Michael Steele	44	37	33	28	Withdrew		

Candidate won majority of votes in the round
Candidate secured a plurality of votes in the round
Candidate withdrew

== After the chairmanship ==
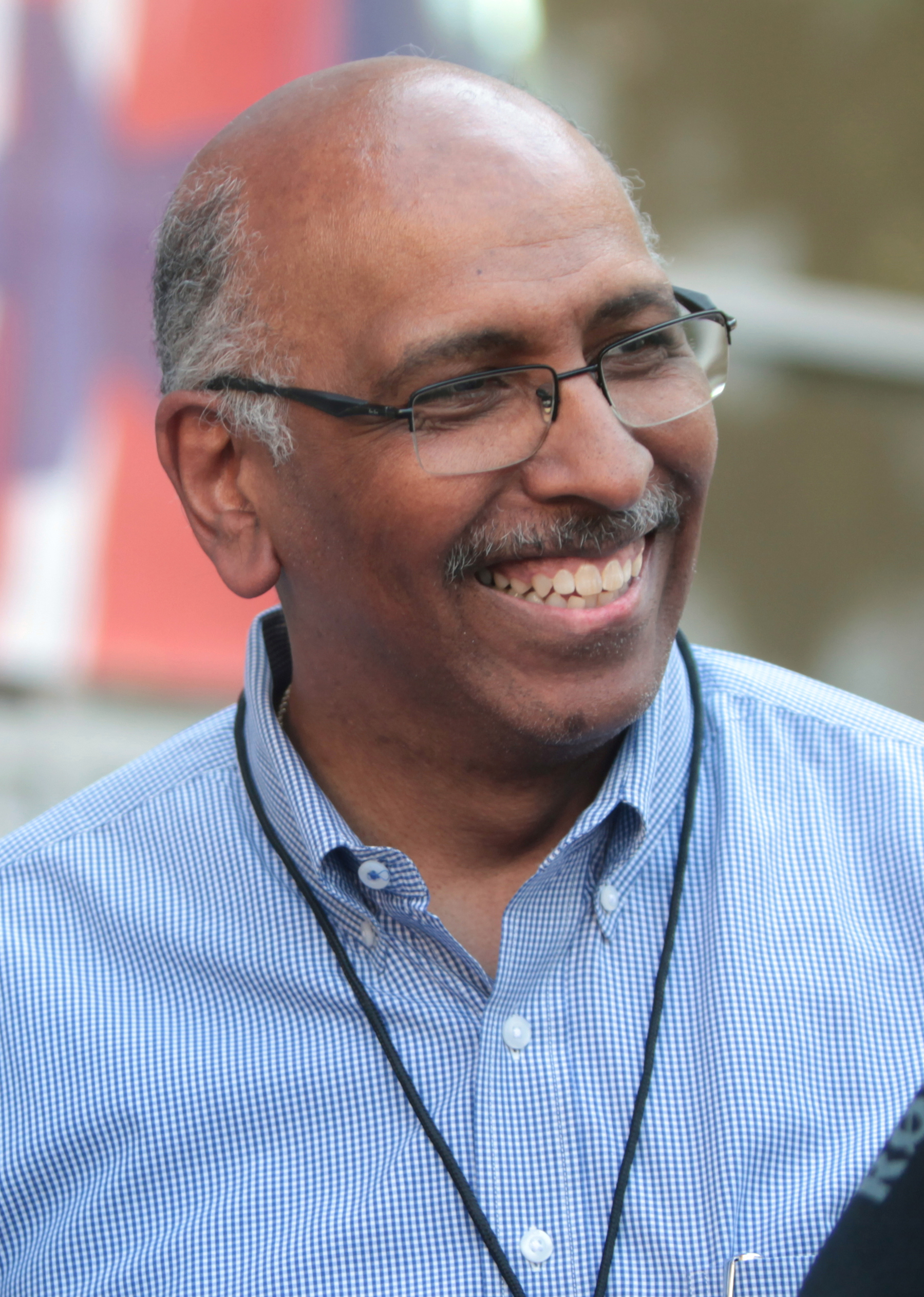
Steele in 2016

After his loss in the chairmanship election, Steele was hired by MSNBC to be a regular political analyst as of May 2011. He also was hired to be a columnist for the online magazine The Root, an African-American news and commentary site owned by The Washington Post Company.

On C-SPAN's Washington Journal on the Sunday after the 2012 Obama reelection victory, Steele expressed some interest in running for RNC Chairman again. He emphasized the need to make conservative minorities feel comfortable and welcome in a party that offered them opportunities to launch political careers in counties and statehouses. In 2018, Steele was named a faculty fellow at Brown University's Watson Institute for International and Public Affairs, where he leads seminars.

In August 2020, Steele joined the Lincoln Project PAC and endorsed Joe Biden for president. In April 2021, he expressed interest in running in the Republican primary for governor of Maryland, later forming an exploratory committee in July 2021. Later that month, state delegate Lauren Arikan filed a campaign finance complaint against Steele, alleging that he was illegally using a 527 committee to coordinate campaign activities. In a formal response, Steele rejected these claims, citing that the committee had not made any expenditures and was not in violation of Maryland campaign finance law. In January 2022, he announced that he would not run for governor. Steele later attended the inauguration of Governor-elect Wes Moore on January 18, 2023.

On November 30, 2023, MSNBC announced that Steele would be co-hosting a new weekend morning show in 2024, The Weekend, alongside Alicia Menendez and Symone Sanders-Townsend. On February 24, 2025, MSNBC announced that the trio would move to a new evening program on weekdays, which later premiered in May 2025 as The Weeknight.

== Political positions ==
=== Economic views ===
As Lieutenant Governor of Maryland, Steele chaired the Governor's Commission on Minority Business Enterprise Reform. Steele criticized the American Recovery and Reinvestment Act of 2009 (stimulus bill).

=== Environment and energy ===
Steele previously rejected the scientific consensus on climate change, claiming in 2009 that the Earth is "cooling" rather than "the supposed warming".

Subsequently, during a panel discussion in 2020, Steele noted that US state governments of both parties were implementing emissions-reductions because they "have to deal with the reality of what science is telling them is going to happen to their states".

=== Opposition to President Donald Trump ===
Steele was openly critical of Donald Trump during his 2016 presidential campaign and has continued to oppose President Trump during his subsequent administration. In a January 2018 interview on MSNBC, in response to an accusation that President Trump had referred to El Salvador and Haiti as "shithole countries", Steele expressed his belief that the President was "racist". Steele reiterated his frustration with Trump and his supporters during the COVID-19 pandemic by saying "I've talked to enough of them over the last few days. I'm exhausted, I'm exasperated. You know, at this point, it's like, save who you can save. Because there's only so much you can do, there's only so much you can say. The fact that we have to literally beg people to wear a mask to save their own dumb ass from getting sick, I'm sorry. To me, it is beyond the imagination... I am just so exhausted with this president."

=== Social views ===
In 2008, Steele said he was opposed to abortion and thought Roe v. Wade was "wrongly decided". In a March 2009 interview with GQ, Steele suggested that abortion restrictions should be left to state governments, and stated that he "absolutely" believed there was room for a "pro-choice" candidate in the GOP. This statement prompted criticism from socially conservative Republicans such as Arkansas Governor Mike Huckabee and former Ohio Secretary of State Ken Blackwell, as well as the Christian Coalition, and Tony Perkins of the Family Research Council. In response to these critics, Steele suggested that he asked God for patience "so I absolutely don't go out and kick this person's ass".

In 2008, Steele said that he personally opposes a constitutional amendment to ban same-sex marriage, saying that he believes states should decide the issue for themselves. Steele, however, has indicated he would uphold the Republican Party platform and support the amendment. He rated the issue of banning same-sex marriage low in importance. In 2009, Steele opposed same-sex civil unions. However, in 2012, Steele said that LGBT couples deserve full privileges and benefits under the law.

In a 2006 interview with The Washington Post, Steele commented on gun control: "Society should draw lines. What do you need an assault weapon for, if you're going hunting? That's overkill. But I don't think that means you go to a total ban for those who want to use guns for skeet shooting or hunting or things like that. But what's the point of passing gun laws if we're not going to enforce them? If you want to talk about gun control, that's where you need to start. We've got 300 gun laws on the books right now. At the end of the day, it's about how we enforce the law."

During his 2006 campaign, Steele said that he only supported stem cell research if it did not result in the destruction of the embryo. In February 2006, Steele compared embryonic stem cell research to medical experiments performed by the Nazis during the Holocaust, remarks for which he later apologized.

In 2009, speaking on illegal immigration, Steele called for the U.S. to "secure our borders first", saying, "you cannot begin to address the concerns of the people who are already here unless and until you have made certain that no more are coming in behind them."

=== Wars in Afghanistan and Iraq ===
In July 2010, video footage of Steele was released in which he stated that the Afghan war was "a war of Obama's choosing. If he's such a student of history has he not understood that, you know, that's the one thing you don't do – is engage in a land war in Afghanistan? Everyone who has tried, over a thousand years of history has failed." He also said the war was "not something the United States had actively prosecuted or wanted to engage in". However, the war in Afghanistan was initiated by George W. Bush in October 2001 in retaliation for the September 11 attacks on New York City and Washington D.C.; Barack Obama increased troop levels there.

Steele's comments drew criticism, with neoconservative commentator William Kristol calling for Steele's resignation and former George W. Bush adviser Karl Rove calling Steele's comment "boneheaded." U.S. Senator John McCain of Arizona, the Republican nominee for president in the 2008 election, withdrew his support from Steele, calling Steele's comments "wildly inaccurate ... there is no excuse for them" and saying "I think that Mr. Steele is going to have to assess as to whether he can still lead the Republican Party as chairman of the Republican National Committee." Senator Jim DeMint called upon Steele to apologize and Senator Lindsey Graham said, "It was an uninformed, unnecessary, unwise, untimely comment. This is not President Obama's war, this is America's war. We need to stand behind the president." Former Vice President Dick Cheney's daughter Elizabeth Cheney also called for Steele to resign. However, Congressman Ron Paul, who is known for his generally antiwar stance, in support of Steele said, "Michael Steele has it right, and Republicans should stick by him."

In contrast to his position on Afghanistan, Steele has been a supporter of the Iraq War and President George W. Bush's war strategy. During his 2006 campaign, Steele opposed setting a timetable for U.S. withdrawal from Iraq. Steele criticized President Obama on the issue, complaining that he had "demonized" the Iraq War.

=== National Popular Vote Interstate Compact ===
Steele is a supporter of the National Popular Vote Interstate Compact. In a piece co-authored with former Michigan Republican Party Chairman Saul Anuzis, Steele states that "the good news is that under a national popular vote, a Republican could probably survive a narrow popular vote loss in Texas or Florida and still win the presidency, because every GOP vote in those states would still count toward a national popular vote majority."

== Right Now ==
Steele's book, Right Now: A 12-Step Program for Defeating the Obama Agenda, was released on January 4, 2010; it was published by Regnery Publishing, ISBN 978-1-59698-108-9. The Associated Press reported that, "Steele focuses much of the book on familiar GOP denunciations of President Barack Obama's overall policies ('a roadmap to failure'), the $787 billion stimulus bill ('a reckless, wasteful, pork-laden spending spree'), liberal views on man-made global warming ('A threat to life on Earth? Depends on whom you ask') and other issues. To regain the public confidence, Steele says the GOP should, among other things, expose the 'reign of error' inherent in liberal policies, contrast conservative and liberal principles, and highlight the damage caused by Obama's policies while explaining conservative solutions."

== Honors and awards ==
Michael Steele has been awarded honors and awards in recognition of his political career. These include:

- 2003 Honorary degree of Doctor of Laws (LL.D) from Morgan State University

== See also ==
- List of African-American firsts
- List of African-American Republicans
- List of minority governors and lieutenant governors in the United States
- List of African-American United States Senate candidates

Party political offices
Preceded by Joyce Lyon Tehres	Chair of the Maryland Republican Party; 2000–2002	Succeeded by Louis Pope
Preceded by Paul Rappaport	Republican nominee for U.S. Senator from Maryland (Class 1); 2006	Succeeded by Dan Bongino
Preceded by Mike Duncan	Chair of the Republican National Committee; 2009–2011	Succeeded by Reince Priebus
Political offices
Preceded by Kathleen Kennedy Townsend	Lieutenant Governor of Maryland; 2003–2007	Succeeded by Anthony Brown
