= Saul Anuzis =

American politician (born 1959)

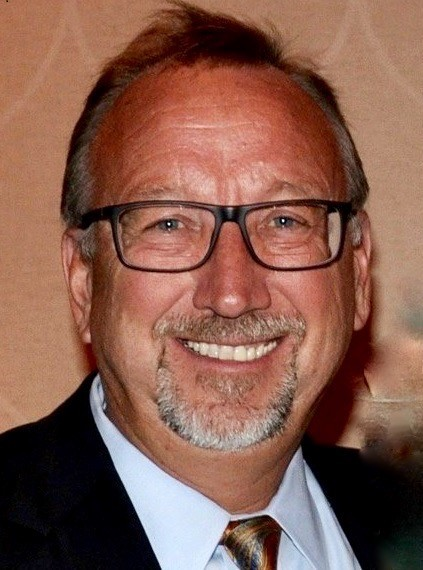

Chair of the Michigan Republican Party
- In office January 21, 2005 – January 31, 2009
- Preceded by: Betsy DeVos
- Succeeded by: Ronald Weiser

Personal details
- Born: Saulius Anuzis; March 6, 1959 (age 67) Detroit, Michigan, U.S.
- Party: Republican
- Spouse: Lina (née Alksninis)
- Children: 4
- Education: University of Michigan–Dearborn

Saulius "Saul" Anuzis (born March 6, 1959) is the president of the 60 Plus Association and a Republican Party politician from the U.S. State of Michigan. He was chairman of the Michigan Republican Party from 2005–2009 and was also a candidate for national chairman of the Republican National Committee in 2009 and 2011.

== Early life ==
Anuzis was born in Detroit, Michigan, to Lithuanian immigrants, Česlovas and Elena Anuzis. He attended Bishop Borgess High School and studied economics at the University of Michigan–Dearborn. He was the first chairman of the College Republican club on campus. His senior year, he was elected President of the Student Government.

== Personal life ==
Anuzis is married to Lina (née Alksninis) and they have four sons, Matas, Tadas, Vytis, and Marius. Anuzis and his family reside in Eaton County.

He is a gubernatorial appointee to the Michigan Jobs Commission and the Michigan Export Development Authority. He is honorary consul to Michigan for the Republic of Lithuania.

Anuzis's parents, Ceslovas and Elena Anuzis, and paternal grandparents, Ignas and Elena Anuzis, received the Righteous Among the Nations award from Israel's national Holocaust memorial, Yad Vashem, for helping three young girls escape from a Jewish ghetto and make their way from Lithuania to Estonia and Belarus during World War II. One of those girls, now grown, nominated them for the award.

== Career ==
In 1980, Anuzis was elected as the youngest delegate to the Republican National Convention. He was elected third vice chairman of the Michigan Republican Party in 1981. Anuzis was a member of the Michigan Republican Party's state committee.

Anuzis managed Dick Posthumus's first state Senate race in 1982 and then worked closely with Posthumus throughout his career in Michigan politics, including running his unsuccessful bid for governor in 2002. During that time, Anuzis worked for the House Republican Campaign Committee, the Senate Republican Campaign Committee and as chief of staff to then-Senate Majority Leader Posthumus.

In 1990, Anuzis and partner Bruce Yuille founded Coast to Coast Telecommunications. They later sold that business in 2000-2001 when Anuzis and Yuille then co-founded Quick Connect USA.

In 2018, Anuzis was appointed President of 60 Plus Association known as the American Association of Senior Citizens, a conservative advocacy group.

On February 5, 2005, Anuzis was elected chairman of the Michigan Republican Party. He was re-elected to a second term February 10, 2007. Anuzis ran unsuccessfully for chairman of the Republican National Committee in 2009 and 2011.

Anuzis also worked for former Speaker Newt Gingrich at American Solutions, he worked on Jack Kemp's 1988 presidential campaign and served as a Senior Advisor in Senator Ted Cruz's 2016 presidential campaign.

Anuzis was elected to fill a vacancy in 2011 to the Republican National Committee as Michigan's National Committeeman. Anuzis was defeated for re-election to the Republican National Committee in 2012 by Dave Agema, a former member of the Michigan House of Representatives who was largely backed by Tea Party activists in the Michigan Republican Party.

Party political offices
Preceded by Betsy DeVos	Chairperson of the Michigan Republican Party; 2005–2009	Succeeded by Ronald Weiser
