= Republican National Committee =

Top institution of the U.S. Republican Party

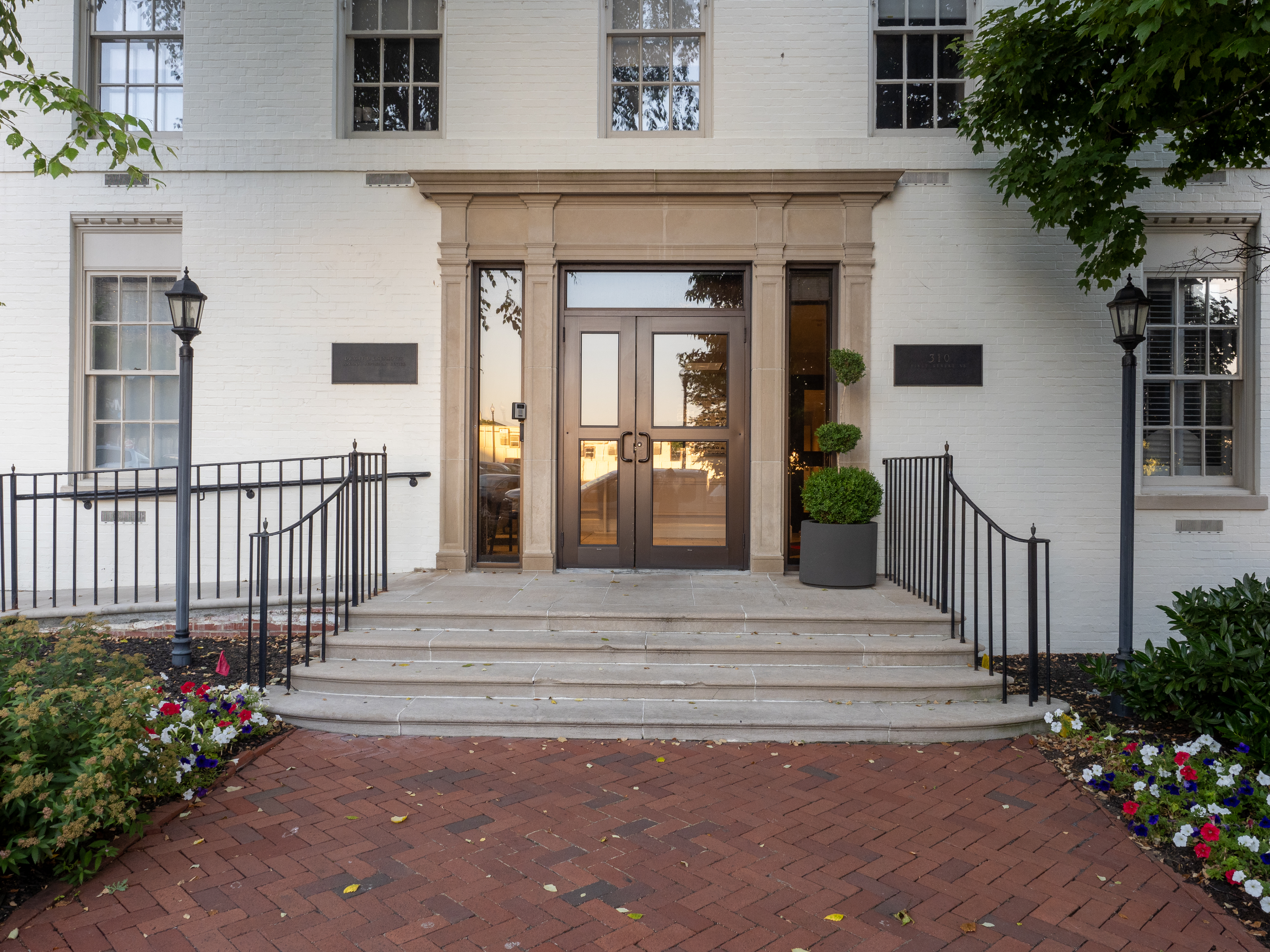
- RNC headquarters in Washington, D.C., 2024
- Founded: June 1856; 170 years ago
- Location(s): 310 First Street SE, Washington, D.C., U.S.
- Coordinates: 38.88538°N 77.00552°W
- Key people: Chair: Joe Gruters; Co-Chair: KC Crosbie; Finance Chair: JD Vance; Secretary: Vicki Drummond; Treasurer: Jennifer Rich
- Affiliations: Republican Party
- Website: www.gop.com

The Republican National Committee (RNC) is the primary committee of the Republican Party of the United States. Its members are chosen by the state delegations at the national convention every four years. It is responsible for developing and promoting the Republican brand and political platform, as well as assisting in fundraising and election strategy. It does not have direct authority over elected officials. It is also responsible for organizing and running the Republican National Convention. When a Republican is president, the White House controls the committee. According to Boris Heersink, "political scientists have traditionally described the parties' national committees as inconsequential but impartial service providers."

Similar committees exist in every U.S. state and most U.S. counties, although in some states party organization is structured by congressional district, allied campaign organizations being governed by a national committee. Joe Gruters is the current committee chairman.

The Democratic Party's counterpart to the RNC is the Democratic National Committee.

== History ==
The 1856 Republican National Convention appointed the first RNC. It consisted of one member from each state and territory to serve for four years. Each national committee since then has followed the precedent of equal representation for each state or territory, regardless of population. From 1924 to 1952, there was a national committeeman and national committeewoman from each state and U.S. possession, and from Washington, D.C. In 1952, committee membership was expanded to include the state party chairs of states that voted Republican in the preceding presidential election, have a Republican majority in their congressional delegation (U.S. representatives and senators), or have Republican governors. By 1968, membership reached 145. As of 2011, the RNC has 168 members.

While a number of the chairs of the RNC have been state governors, the only person to have chaired the RNC and later become U.S. president is George H. W. Bush. During Bush's time as RNC chair, Spiro Agnew was being investigated for corruption, which would later lead to Agnew's resignation as vice president. Bush assisted, at the request of Nixon and Agnew, in getting John Glenn Beall Jr., the U.S. senator from Maryland, to pressure his brother, George Beall the U.S. attorney in Maryland, to shut down the investigation into Agnew. Attorney Beall ignored the pressure.

In 2013, the RNC began an outreach campaign towards the American youth and minority voters, after studies showed these groups generally perceived that the Republican Party did not care about their concerns.

During the presidency of Donald Trump, the RNC showed staunch loyalty to President Trump, even at times when prominent Republicans did not. Under Ronna McDaniel's leadership, the RNC ran ads for Trump's 2020 campaign as early as 2018, put numerous Trump campaign workers and affiliates on the RNC payroll, spent considerable funds at Trump-owned properties, covered his legal fees in the Russian interference investigation, hosted Trump's Fake News Awards, and criticized Trump critics within the Republican Party. Two days after the January 6th riot at the Capitol following the controversial 2020 presidential election results, the RNC held an event where members expressed loyalty to the President.

In February 2022, the RNC censured two Republican representatives, Liz Cheney of Wyoming and Adam Kinzinger of Illinois, for their participation in the United States House Select Committee to Investigate the January 6 Attack on the US Capitol; the censure statement described the committee as a "Democrat-led persecution of ordinary citizens who engaged in legitimate political discourse." The censure of sitting congressmembers, and particularly the description of the January 6 events as "legitimate political discourse", received bipartisan criticism from politicians and media.

In May 2024, The Associated Press reported that under Lara Trump, the RNC had "sought alliances with election deniers, conspiracy theorists and alt-right advocates the party had previously kept at arm's length." It also noted the prevalence of election deniers had increased among top Republican officeholders and RNC officials as part of a larger election denial movement in the United States.

== Role ==
The Republican National Committee's main function is to assist the Republican Party of the United States. It helps to promote the Republican political platform and the "party brand" or image. It is more focused on campaign and organizational strategy than public policy.

It helps coordinate fundraising and election strategy, as well as organizing and running the Republican National Convention.

According to Jim Nicholson, a former chairman of the Republican National Committee:

“The party can’t coordinate with these Super PACs and neither can the campaigns so there’s a lot more chaos . . . .And the party structure clearly has a diminished role because they don’t have the resources they used to have.”

== Organization ==
Since January 17, 2025, the Republican National Committee has been chaired by Joe Gruters and co-chaired by KC Crosbie.

The previous chair of the Republican National Committee was Michael Whatley, serving from 2024 to 2025. Before him, Ronna McDaniel was chair of the RNC from 2017 until 2024 and had previously been chair of the Michigan Republican Party from 2015 to 2017.

In January 2019, Thomas O. Hicks Jr. was elected co-chairman of the RNC. Hicks has a strong connection to former president Trump's campaigns and policy initiatives, having served as chairman of the America First Action PAC and America First Policies, and as national finance co-chairman for Donald J. Trump for President.

Similar committees to the RNC exist in each U.S. state and most U.S. counties. The RNC also organizes volunteer groups for specific interests, such as the Black Republican Activists, GOP Hispanics, RNC Women (not to be confused with National Federation of Republican Women), GOP Faith, Asian Pacific Americans, Young Leaders, and Veterans & Military Families.

== Chairs of the Republican National Committee ==
=== Elections ===
==== 1993 election ====
Candidate	Round 1	Round 2	Round 3
Haley Barbour	60	66	90
Spencer Abraham	47	52	57
Bo Callaway	22	19	18
John Ashcroft	26	20	Withdrew
Craig Berkman	10	8	Withdrew

Candidate won majority of votes in the round
Candidate secured a plurality of votes in the round
Candidate withdrew

==== 1997 election ====
Candidate	Round 1	Round 2	Round 3	Round 4	Round 5	Round 6
Jim Nicholson	23	30	38	65	74	*
David Norcross	41	46	47	50	47	Withdrew
Steve Merrill	42	42	43	46	43	Withdrew
John S. Herrington	4	4	3	3	Withdrew	-
Tom Pauken	22	24	21	Withdrew		-
Chuck Yob	17	18	12	Withdrew		-
Robert T. Bennett	15	Withdrew				

Candidate won majority of votes in the round
Candidate secured a plurality of votes in the round
Candidate withdrew

- Merrill and Norcross both dropped out after the fifth round, giving the chairmanship to Nicholson by acclamation.

==== 2009 election ====
On November 24, 2008, Steele launched his campaign for the RNC chairmanship with the launch of his website. On January 30, 2009, Steele won the chairmanship of the RNC in the sixth round, with 91 votes to Dawson's 77.

Source: CQPolitics, and Poll Pundit.

Candidate	Round 1	Round 2	Round 3	Round 4	Round 5	Round 6
Michael Steele	46	48	51	60	79	91
Katon Dawson	28	29	34	62	69	77
Saul Anuzis	22	24	24	31	20	Withdrew
Ken Blackwell	20	19	15	15	Withdrew	-
Mike Duncan	52	48	44	Withdrew		

Candidate won majority of votes in the round
Candidate secured a plurality of votes in the round
Candidate withdrew

On announcing his candidacy to succeed RNC Chairman Duncan, former Maryland Lt. Gov. Michael Steele described the party as being at a crossroads and not knowing what to do. "I think I may have some keys to open the door, some juice to turn on the lights," he said.

Six people ran for the 2009 RNC chairmanship: Steele, Ken Blackwell, Mike Duncan, Saul Anuzis, Katon Dawson and Chip Saltsman. After Saltsman's withdrawal, there were only five candidates during the hotly contested balloting January 30, 2009.

After the third round of balloting that day, Steele held a small lead over incumbent Mike Duncan of Kentucky, with 51 votes to Duncan's 44. Shortly after the announcement of the standings, Duncan dropped out of contention without endorsing a candidate. Ken Blackwell, the only other African-American candidate, dropped out after the fourth ballot and endorsed Steele, though Blackwell had been the most socially conservative of the candidates and Steele had been accused of not being "sufficiently conservative." Steele picked up Blackwell's votes. After the fifth round, Steele held a ten-vote lead over Katon Dawson, with 79 votes, and Saul Anuzis dropped out. After the sixth vote, he won the chairmanship of the RNC over Dawson by a vote of 91 to 77.

Mississippi governor and former RNC chair Haley Barbour has suggested the party will focus its efforts on congressional and gubernatorial elections in the coming years rather than the next presidential election. "When I was chairman of the Republican National Committee the last time we lost the White House in 1992, we focused exclusively on 1993 and 1994. And at the end of that time, we had both houses of Congress with Republican majorities, and we'd gone from 17 Republican governors to 31. So anyone talking about 2012 today doesn't have their eye on the ball. What we ought to worry about is rebuilding our party over the next year and particularly in 2010," Barbour said at the November 2008 Republican Governors conference.

==== 2011 election ====
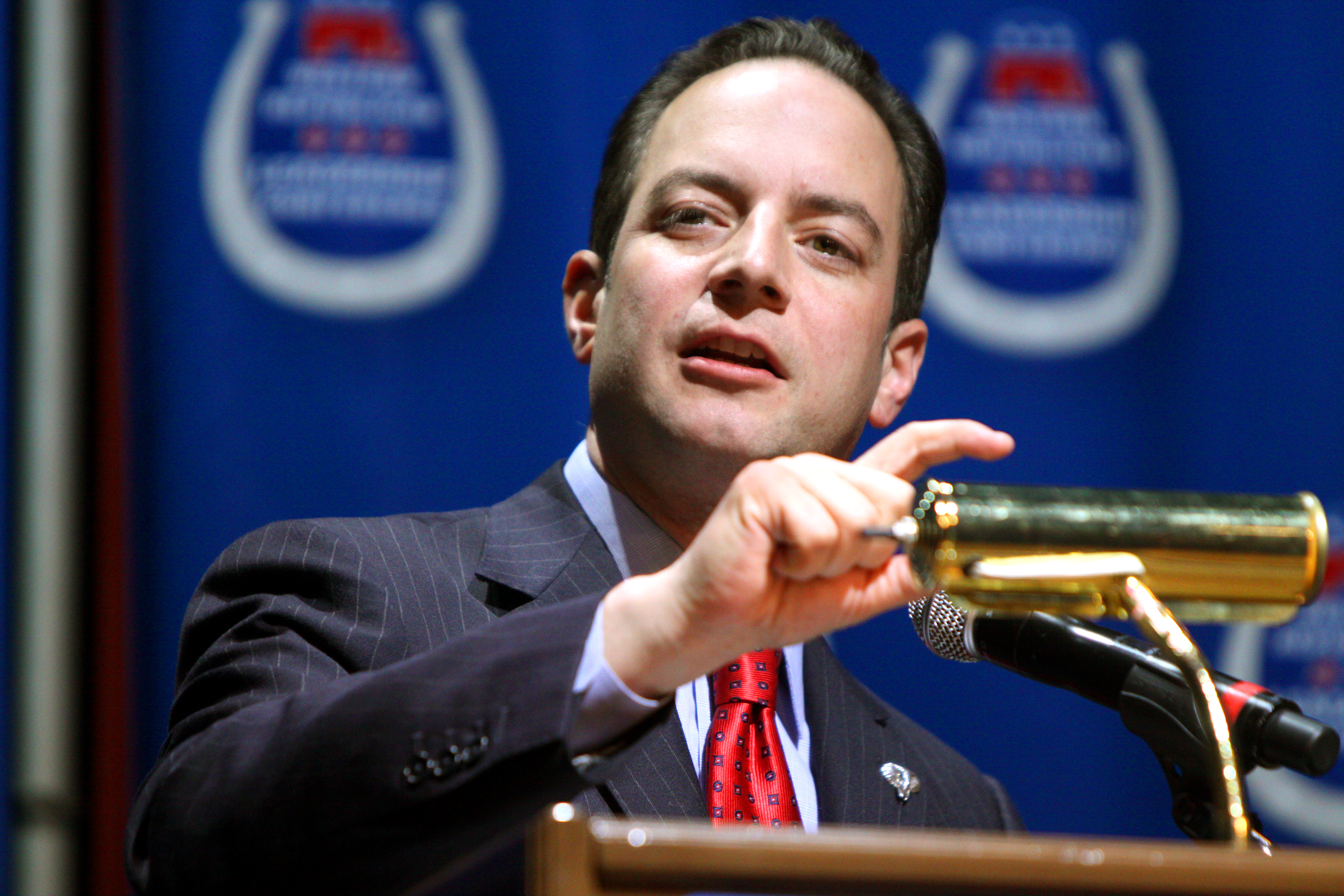
Chairman of the Republican National Committee Reince Priebus at the Western Republican Leadership Conference in October 2011 in Las Vegas

Michael Steele ran for re-election at the 2011 RNC winter meeting. Other candidates were Reince Priebus, Republican Party of Wisconsin chairman; Ann Wagner, former ambassador to Luxembourg; Saul Anuzis, former Republican Party chairman of Michigan; and Maria Cino, former acting secretary of transportation under George W. Bush. Steele's critics increasingly called on him to step down as RNC chair when his term ended in 2011. A debate for chairman hosted by Americans for Tax Reform took place on January 3 at the National Press Club. The election for chairman took place January 14 at the RNC's winter meeting with Reince Priebus winning on the seventh ballot after Steele and Wagner withdrew.

Candidate	Round 1	Round 2	Round 3	Round 4	Round 5	Round 6	Round 7
Reince Priebus	45	52	54	58	67	80	97
Saul Anuzis	24	22	21	24	32	37	43
Maria Cino	32	30	28	29	40	34	28
Ann Wagner	23	27	32	28	28	17	Withdrew
Michael Steele	44	37	33	28	Withdrew		

Candidate won majority of votes in the round
Candidate secured a plurality of votes in the round
Candidate withdrew

==== 2013–2023 elections ====
Priebus won re-election with near unanimity in the party's 2013 meeting in Charlotte, North Carolina. He was re-elected to a third term in 2015, setting him up to become the longest serving head of the party ever.

After winning in November 2016, President-elect Donald Trump designated Priebus as his White House chief of staff, to begin upon his taking office in January 2017; David Bossie of Maryland was seen as a potential next RNC chairman.

Trump then recommended Ronna Romney McDaniel as RNC chairwoman and she was elected to that role by the RNC in January 2017. McDaniel was re-elected in 2019 and 2021. Mike Lindell announced that he would challenge McDaniel in 2023. Lindell accused McDaniel of not denying the legitimacy of the 2020 presidential election forcefully enough, and criticized her for presiding over the RNC during three disappointing election years. McDaniel was re-elected in to a fourth term in January 2023, easily defeating Lindell and California RNC committeewoman Harmeet Dhillon.

Candidate	Round 1
Ronna McDaniel	111
Harmeet Dhillon	51
Mike Lindell	4
Lee Zeldin	1

Candidate won majority of votes in the round

==== 2024 election ====
On February 6, 2024, The New York Times reported that McDaniel intended to resign after the South Carolina Republican presidential primary held on February 24, 2024, following dissatisfaction from former president Donald Trump, who publicly supported North Carolina Republican Party chair Michael Whatley.

McDaniel confirmed these reports when, on February 26, 2024, she and Drew McKissick announced their resignations as chair and co-chair of the RNC effective on March 8, 2024. Later that same day, Michael Whatley, chair of the North Carolina Republican Party, announced that he would seek the position of RNC chair.

Lara Trump, daughter-in-law of president Donald Trump, also announced on February 28 that she would seek to succeed McKissick as co-chair of the RNC. Both Whatley and Trump gained the endorsement of former President Trump.

Whatley and Trump were both elected via acclamation as chair and co-chair of the Republican National Committee on March 8, 2024.

==== January 2025 election ====
Whatley was reelected as RNC chair on January 17, 2025, and KC Crosbie, whom Donald Trump endorsed, was elected as co-chair, after Lara Trump chose not to continue in the role.

==== August 2025 election ====
On July 24, 2025, after Michael Whatley announced he would run in the 2026 United States Senate election in North Carolina and vacated his position as chair of the RNC, Donald Trump endorsed Joe Gruters to be the next chair of the RNC. Whatley endorsed him as well, and called Gruters "a true conservative fighter". On August 22, 2025, Gruters was unanimously elected Chairman of the Republican National Committee. After his election, Gruters told members of the RNC: “Today is not about one person, it is about our mission: The midterms are ahead, where we must expand our majority in the House and Senate and continue electing Republicans nationwide."

== Current Republican National Committee members ==
A collapsible list of the voting members of the Republican National Committee follows, as of April 10, 2025. The state chair, national committeeman and national committeewoman each receive one vote at RNC meetings and vote for RNC chairmanship.

State	Chairperson	Committeeman	Committeewoman
Alabama	Scott Stadthagen	Bill Harris	Vicki Drummond
Alaska	Carmela Warfield	Brian Hove	Cynthia Henry
American Samoa	Will Sword	Frank Barron	Amata Radewagen
Arizona	Sergio Arellano	Jake Hoffman	Liz Harris
Arkansas	Joseph Wood	Eddie Arnold	Mindy McAlindon
California	Corrin Rankin	Shawn Steel	Connie Conway
Colorado	Craig Steiner	Randy Corporon	Christy Fidura
Connecticut	Ben Proto	John H. Frey	Annalisa Stravato
Delaware	Gene Truono	Hank McCann	Mary McCrossan
District of Columbia	Patrick Mara	Tim Costa	Joanne Young
Florida	Evan Power	Joe Gruters	Kathleen King
Georgia	Josh McKoon	Jason Thompson	Amy Kremer
Guam	Shawn Gumataotao	Juan Carlos Benitez	Sam Mabini-Young
Hawaii	Shirlene Ostrov	Scott Smart	Laura Nakanelua
Idaho	Dorothy Moon	Bryan Smith	Vicki Keen
Illinois	Bob Grogan	Dean White	Rhonda Belford
Indiana	Lana Keesling	Victor Smith	Anne Hathaway
Iowa	Jeff Kaufmann	Steve Scheffler	Tamara Scott
Kansas	Danedri Herbert	Mark Kahrs	Wendy Bingesser
Kentucky	Robert Benvenuti	John McCarthy	KC Crosbie
Louisiana	Derek Babcock	Roger Villere	Gena Gore
Maine	James Deyermond	David Whitney	Lauren LePage
Maryland	Nicole Harris	David Bossie	Nicolee Ambrose
Massachusetts	Amy Carnevale	Brad Wyatt	Janet Fogarty
Michigan	Jim Runestad	Robert Steele	Hima Kolanagireddy
Minnesota	Alex Plechash	AK Kamara	Emily Novtony-Chance
Mississippi	Mike Hurst	Arnie Hederman	Lesley Davis
Missouri	Peter Kinder	David Lightner	Maryam Mohammadkhani
Montana	Art Wittich	Tanner Smith	Debbie Churchill
Nebraska	Mary Jane Truemper	William Feely	Fanchon Blythe
Nevada	Michael McDonald	James DeGraffenreid	Sue Lowden
New Hampshire	Scott Maltzie	Bill O'Brien	Mary Jane Beauregard
New Jersey	Christine Hanlon	Bill Palatucci	Janice Fields
New Mexico	Amy Barela	Jim Townsend	Tina Dziuk
New York	Ed Cox	Joseph G. Cairo Jr.	Jennifer Rich
North Carolina	Jason Simmons	Ed Broyhill	Kyshia Brassington
North Dakota	Matthew Simon	Steve Nagel	Lori Hinz
Northern Mariana Islands	Patrick Cepeda	Edward Deleon Guerrero	Irene Holl
Ohio	Alex Triantafilou	Dave Johnson	Jane Timken
Oklahoma	Charity Linch	Larry Murray	Karen Hardin
Oregon	Connie Whelchel	Dan Mason	Tracy Honl
Pennsylvania	Greg Rothman	Andy Reilly	Lori Hardiman
Puerto Rico	Angel Cintrón	Luis Fortuño	Zoraida "Zori" Fonalledas
Rhode Island	Allyn Meyers	Thomas Carroll	Sue Cienki
South Carolina	Drew McKissick	Tyson Grinstead	Cindy Costa
South Dakota	Jim Eschenbaum	Ried Holien	Heidi Engelhart
Tennessee	Scott Golden	Oscar Brock	Beth Campbell
Texas	D'Rinda Randall	Robin Armstrong	Debbie Georgatos
US Virgin Islands	John Yob	Jim Hughes	April Newland
Utah	Robert Axson	Brad Bonham	Kim Coleman
Vermont	Paul Dame	Josh Bechhoefer	Deb Billado
Virginia	Jeff Ryer	Morton Blackwell	Patti Lyman
Washington	Jim Walsh	Mathew Patrick Thomas	Marlene Pfiefer
West Virginia	Josh Holstein	Larry Pack	Beth Bloch
Wisconsin	Brian Schimming	Terry Dittrich	Pam Travis
Wyoming	Bryan Miller	Corey Steinmetz	Nina Webber

== Para Bellum Labs ==
In February 2014, during the chairmanship of Reince Priebus, the RNC launched an in-house technology incubator called Para Bellum Labs. This new unit of the RNC was first headed by Azarias Reda, an engineer with a PhD in computer science from the University of Michigan. The effort is designed to help the party and its candidates bridge the technology gap. "Para bellum", translated from Latin, means "prepare for war."

== Federal "pay-to-play" investigation ==
In September 2019, McDaniel emailed Doug Manchester, whose nomination to become Ambassador to the Bahamas was stalled in the Senate, asking for $500,000 in donations to the Republican Party. Manchester responded, noting that his wife had given $100,000 and that his family would "respond" once he was confirmed by the Republican-led Senate to the ambassadorship. Manchester copied the email to aides of two U.S. senators whose support he needed to win confirmation. CBS News described McDaniel's action as a "possible pay-for-play scheme" for the ambassadorship. The San Diego Union-Tribune reported in May 2021 that a federal grand jury had issued a subpoena in a criminal investigation into Manchester's nomination, apparently focused on the RNC, McDaniel and RNC co-chair Tommy Hicks, "and possibly members of Congress". The Union-Tribune reported the investigation began in 2020.

== See also ==
- Republicans Overseas
- Democratic National Committee
- Green National Committee
- Libertarian National Committee
