= Saltsman =

Saltsman is a surname. Notable people with the surname include:

- Adam Saltsman, American video game designer
- Bruce Saltsman (1930–2017), American civil servant from Tennessee
- Chip Saltsman (born 1968), American politician from Tennessee
- Dmitry Saltsman (born 1974), Tajikistani footballer
- Don Saltsman (1933–2014), American politician from Illinois
- Max Saltsman (1921–1985), Canadian businessman and politician

== See also ==
- Saltman (surname)
- Salzman, surname
- Zaltzman (surname)
