= 2008 Republican Party presidential candidates =

Republican Party presidential candidates, 2008
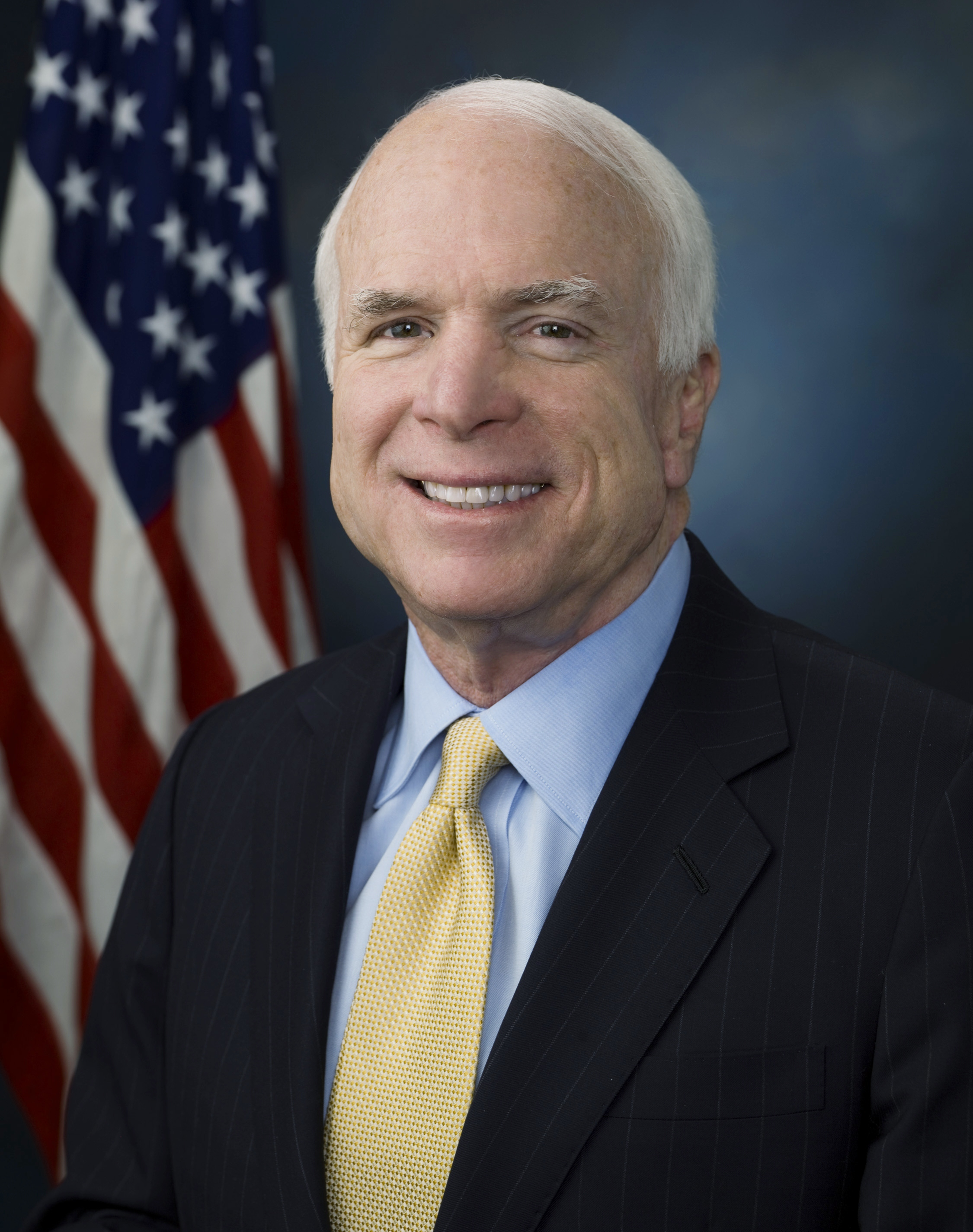

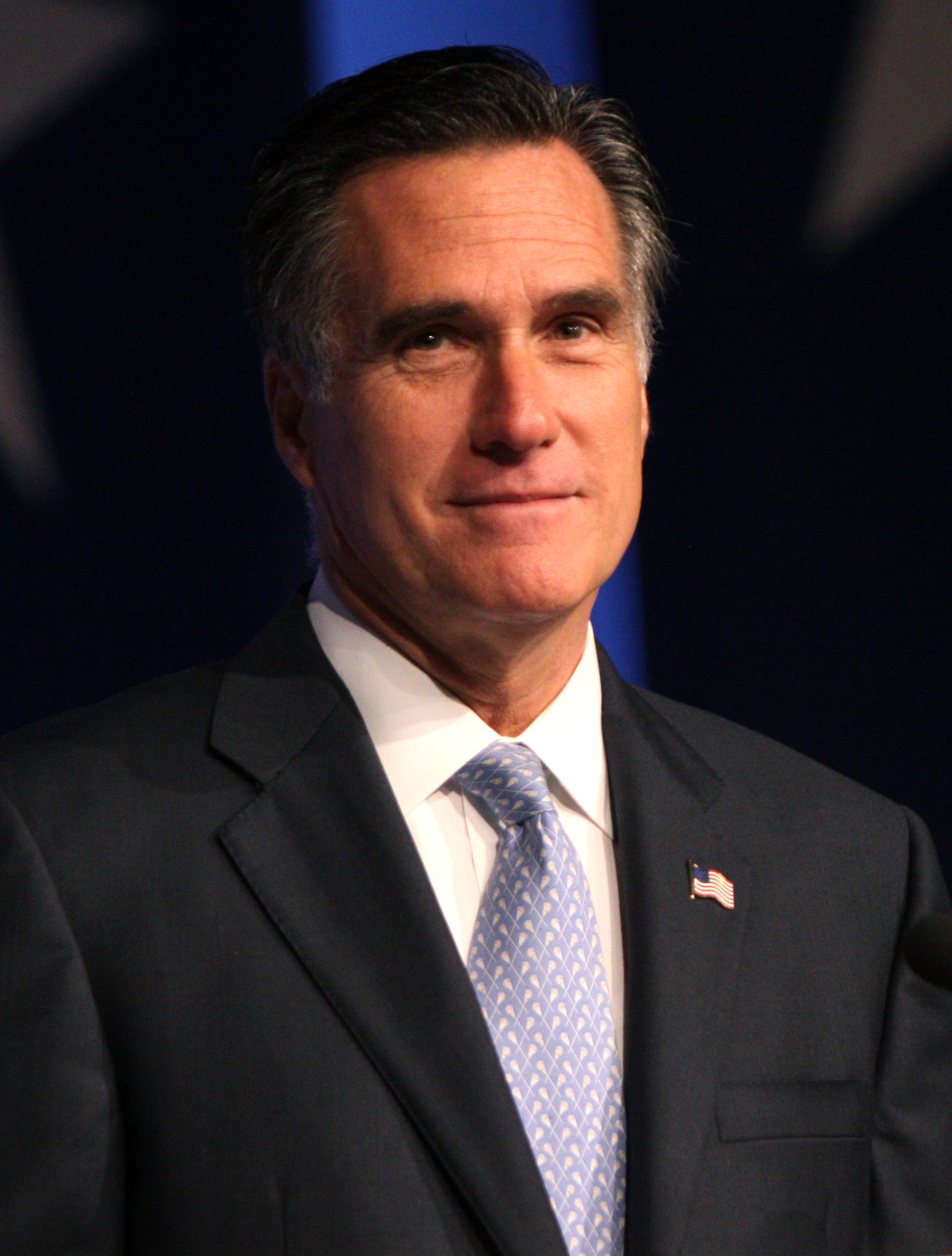

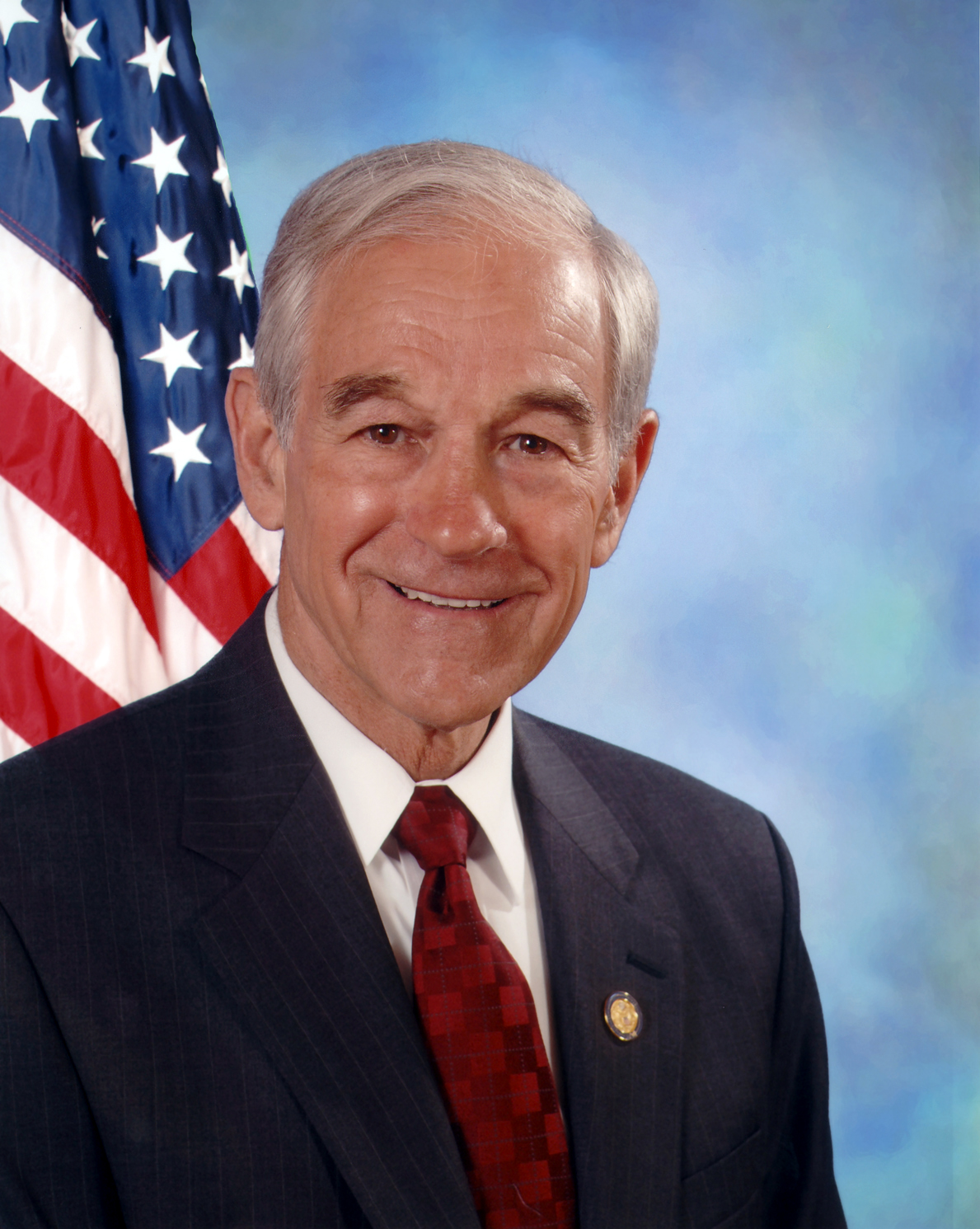
Candidate	John McCain	Mike Huckabee
Home state	Arizona	Arkansas
Delegate count	1,575	278
States carried	37	8
Popular vote	9,902,797	4,276,046
Percentage	46.7%	20.1%
Candidate	Mitt Romney	Ron Paul
Home state	Massachusetts	Texas
Delegate count	271	35
States carried	11	0
Popular vote	4,699,788	1,160,403
Percentage	22.2%	5.6%

This article contains lists of official candidates associated with the 2008 Republican Party presidential primaries for the 2008 United States presidential election.

In accordance with the 22nd Amendment, incumbent President George W. Bush was prohibited from running for president in 2008, having served two full terms in the office. Vice President Dick Cheney chose not to run for president.

On March 4, 2008, John McCain became the Republican presumptive presidential nominee when he obtained the 1,191 delegates necessary to receive the party's nomination. Mike Huckabee announced his withdrawal from the race later in the evening. McCain's last remaining competitor in the race, Ron Paul, withdrew on June 12, 2008.

== Delegate race count ==
This chart shows the total number of delegates committed to each candidate from the Primaries/caucuses/state conventions (different state parties use varied methods for electing delegates).

2008 Republican presidential primaries delegate count As of June 10, 2008
Candidates	Actual pledged delegates^{1} (1,780 of 1,917)	Estimated total delegates^{2} (2,159 of 2,380; 1,191 needed to win)
John McCain	1,378	1,575
Mike Huckabee	240	278
Mitt Romney	148	271
Ron Paul	14	35
Color key: / 1st place / Candidate has withdrawn
Sources:^{1} "Primary Season Election Results". The New York Times. September 16, 2008. Archived from the original on September 16, 2008.^{2} "Election Center 2008 - Republican Delegate Scorecard". CNN. June 4, 2008.

== Nominee ==
Senator John McCain	Main article: John McCain presidential campaign, 2008 See also: Political positions of John McCain John McCain, born August 29, 1936, in the U.S.-controlled Panama Canal Zone, Senator from Arizona. Born into a military family, he became a naval aviator and POW during the Vietnam War. Often characterized as a Republican maverick in the Senate, he is well known. In 2000, he failed in his attempt against George W. Bush for the Republican nomination: McCain continued his ultimately unsuccessful campaign long after the other Republican candidates had united behind Bush. McCain's bipartisan compromise on judicial nominations and his strong support of campaign finance reform have drew the ire of many groups, However, his party stood with him on issues concerning foreign policy and government spending. On November 15, 2006, McCain announced he would form an exploratory committee. On the Late Show with David Letterman on February 28, 2007, he announced he would seek the GOP presidential nomination. He made a formal announcement on April 25, 2007. On November 4, McCain was defeated for the presidency by Barack Obama, the Democratic nominee.

== Withdrew during the primary elections ==
Candidates who withdrew from seeking the nomination.
Rudy Giuliani, former mayor of New York City	Main article: Rudy Giuliani presidential campaign, 2008 See also: Political positions of Rudy Giuliani Rudy Giuliani, born May 28, 1944, in New York, former mayor of New York City. Giuliani said on October 2, 2005, that he would look at the possibility of running for president. On November 13, 2006, he announced that he was forming an exploratory committee. He led several state and nationwide polls for the Republican nomination and the general election, and had been mentioned by many media sources as a possible candidate since the 9/11 attacks and a speech to the 2004 Republican Convention. (See polls below) On February 5, 2007, Giuliani unofficially entered the race for the 2008 U.S. presidential election by filing a "statement of candidacy" with the Federal Election Commission, but legally keeping him at the same level as he was while running an exploratory committee. On February 15, Giuliani officially announced that he was running on CNN's Larry King Live show. Giuliani finished third in the Florida primary on January 29, 2008. The next day he withdrew from the race and endorsed John McCain.
Representative Duncan Hunter	Main article: Duncan Hunter presidential campaign, 2008 See also: Political positions of Duncan Hunter Duncan Hunter, born May 31, 1948, in Riverside, California, U.S. Representative from that state and former chairman of the House Armed Services Committee. Hunter formally announced his presidential candidacy in Spartanburg, South Carolina, on January 25, 2007. He withdrew from the race on January 19, 2008, after a poor showing in the Nevada Republican caucuses, and endorsed Mike Huckabee.
Mike Huckabee, former governor of Arkansas	Main article: Mike Huckabee presidential campaign, 2008 See also: Political positions of Mike Huckabee Mike Huckabee, born August 24, 1955, was the governor of the U.S. state of Arkansas from 1996 to 2007. He announced his candidacy on January 28, 2007. After Mitt Romney withdrew from the race, Huckabee chose to continue with his campaign, despite the fact McCain was already the presumptive nominee. Following losses to McCain in the Texas, Ohio, Vermont, and Rhode Island primaries, he ended his presidential campaign on the evening of March 4, 2008, and endorsed McCain the following day.
Representative Ron Paul	Main article: Ron Paul presidential campaign, 2008 See also: Political positions of Ron Paul Ron Paul, born August 20, 1935, in Green Tree, Pennsylvania, is a longtime U.S. Representative from Texas with a strong constitutionalist and libertarian voting record. He first ran for president as a Libertarian nearly two decades before the 2008 campaign. On January 11, 2007, Paul filed papers to form an exploratory committee for the 2008 presidential race. He formally declared his candidacy 12 March 2007 as a guest on Washington Journal on C-SPAN. On February 20, 2007, Paul's exploratory committee posted on YouTube a formal video of him explaining his reason for running. Paul did well in Republican straw polls and broke several fundraising records including raising the most money ever raised in 24 hours, when Paul raised over $6.3 million on December 16, 2007, as a part of a moneybomb celebrating the Boston Tea Party. On June 12, Paul withdrew from the race. He did not endorse John McCain as the presumptive nominee for president - Paul eventually went on to endorse Chuck Baldwin of the Constitution Party.
Mitt Romney, former governor of Massachusetts	Main article: Mitt Romney presidential campaign, 2008 See also: Political positions of Mitt Romney Mitt Romney, born March 12, 1947, in Michigan, is former governor of Massachusetts. He formed a presidential exploratory committee on January 3, 2007, the day before he left the governor's office. Romney officially announced his candidacy on February 13, 2007, at the Henry Ford Museum in Dearborn, Michigan. On February 7, 2008, Romney announced that he was withdrawing from the race, and endorsed John McCain.
Alan Keyes, former U.S. Ambassador	Main article: Alan Keyes presidential campaign, 2008 Alan Keyes, born August 7, 1950, is an American conservative political activist, author, former diplomat, and perennial candidate for public office. Keyes announced his candidacy for president in a radio interview on September 14, 2007. He participated in one nationally televised debate before the primaries. His best showing was a 4th-place finish in North Carolina. Keyes withdrew from consideration on April 15, 2008, when he announced he was leaving the Republican party and advocating to be the Constitution Party nominee for president.
Fred Thompson, former senator of Tennessee	Main article: Fred Thompson presidential campaign, 2008 See also: Political positions of Fred Thompson Fred Dalton Thompson, born August 19, 1942, was a former senator from Tennessee and a former actor, best known for playing D.A. Arthur Branch on Law & Order. On March 11, 2007, Thompson said "I'm giving some thought to it. Going to leave the door open. A lot of people think it's late already. I don't really think it is, although the rules of the game have changed somewhat. ... I think people are somewhat disillusioned. I think a lot of people are cynical out there. I think they're looking for something different." On June 1, Thompson announced he had established a preliminary campaign committee, thus taking his first formal step toward an official presidential bid. On September 5, he officially entered the presidential race. On January 22, 2008, he ended his campaign and endorsed John McCain.

== Withdrew before primary elections ==
Candidates who dropped out before the Iowa Caucuses
Senator Sam Brownback	Main article: Sam Brownback 2008 presidential campaign Sam Brownback, born September 12, 1956, in Kansas, senior Senator from that state. In April 2005, the Associated Press reported that Brownback, who is little known outside his home state, "is using a network of social conservatives and Christian activists to raise his profile" in such battleground states as Iowa and New Hampshire. He is well known for his social and fiscal conservative record, such as opposing abortion and instituting a flat tax alternative to the current IRS Code. He was also instrumental in Congress' bestowing the Congressional Medal upon Mother Teresa. In his own words, "The core of my being is to rebuild the family and renew the culture." On December 4, 2006, Brownback announced that he would form an exploratory committee. On January 20, 2007, Brownback officially announced his candidacy. Of his campaign, Brownback said, "I'm a son of a farmer from Kansas ... I still think anybody can be president. I don't think you have to show up with $100 million to do it. ... I'm the tortoise in the race. And I don't like how the race starts; I like how it ends up." Brownback was one of three who raised his hand in the May 3, 2007, Republican candidates debate when asked "Is there anybody on the stage who does not believe in evolution?". Despite his high-profile among Evangelicals, most of them threw their support behind Mike Huckabee. Brownback officially withdrew from the presidential race on October 19, 2007, and endorsed John McCain.
Jim Gilmore, former governor of Virginia	Main article: Jim Gilmore presidential campaign, 2008 Jim Gilmore, a Draft for President group was formed in August 2006, encouraging former Virginia Governor Jim Gilmore to run for president after he was seen traveling to the presidential primary states. In November 2006, Gilmore told ABC News that a 2008 presidential run was one of several possibilities he is considering. On December 19, 2006, Gilmore announced he was forming an exploratory committee for a presidential candidacy. Gilmore announced on December 20, 2006, that he would launch his exploratory committee on January 2, 2007. Perhaps hoping to mirror the surprising 2004 campaign of Democrat Howard Dean, another former governor with little national recognition when he entered the race, Gilmore declared that he represents "the Republican wing of the Republican Party" echoing the popular Dean quotation. Gilmore declared his candidacy from the Des Moines, Iowa GOP headquarters on April 26, 2007. Gilmore, however, raised a mere $380,000 in the first half of 2007, which he cited as a reason why he withdrew from the presidential race on July 14, 2007, and endorsed John McCain.
Representative Tom Tancredo	Main article: Tom Tancredo presidential campaign, 2008 Tom Tancredo, born December 20, 1945, in Colorado, U.S. Representative from that state and leading advocate for more restrictive immigration policies. On April 2, 2007, Rep. Tancredo announced his official candidacy on Iowa talk radio station 1040 WHO. Tancredo has a dedicated grassroots following among paleoconservatives. He has visited early Presidential primary states such as New Hampshire, Michigan and Iowa to begin building popular support and has polled favorably amongst grassroots Republicans. Tancredo announced on January 16, 2007, that he was forming an exploratory committee. Tancredo was one of three who raised his hand in the May 3, 2007, Republican candidates debate when asked "Is there anybody on the stage who does not believe in evolution?" On December 20, 2007, Tancredo withdrew from the race and endorsed Mitt Romney. After Romney withdrew from the race, Tancredo threw his support behind John McCain.
Tommy Thompson, former governor of Wisconsin	Main article: Tommy Thompson presidential campaign, 2008 Tommy Thompson, born November 19, 1941, in Elroy, Wisconsin, is the former four-term Governor of Wisconsin and was Secretary of Health and Human Services under President George W. Bush from 2001 to 2005. He announced interest in the 2008 nomination and, on December 15, 2006, announced that he had formed an exploratory committee. He officially announced his candidacy on April 1, 2007. After a poor showing in the August 11 Iowa Straw Poll, Tommy Thompson announced on the following day that he is withdrawing from the race, and endorsed Rudy Giuliani. After Giuliani withdrew from the race, Thompson threw his support behind John McCain.

== See also ==
- 2008 Republican National Convention
- 2008 Republican Party vice presidential candidate selection
- 2008 Republican Party presidential primaries
- Nationwide opinion polling for the 2008 United States presidential election
- 2008 Democratic Party presidential candidates
- Third-party and independent candidates for the 2008 United States presidential election
- 2008 United States presidential election timeline
