= Political positions of Mike Huckabee =

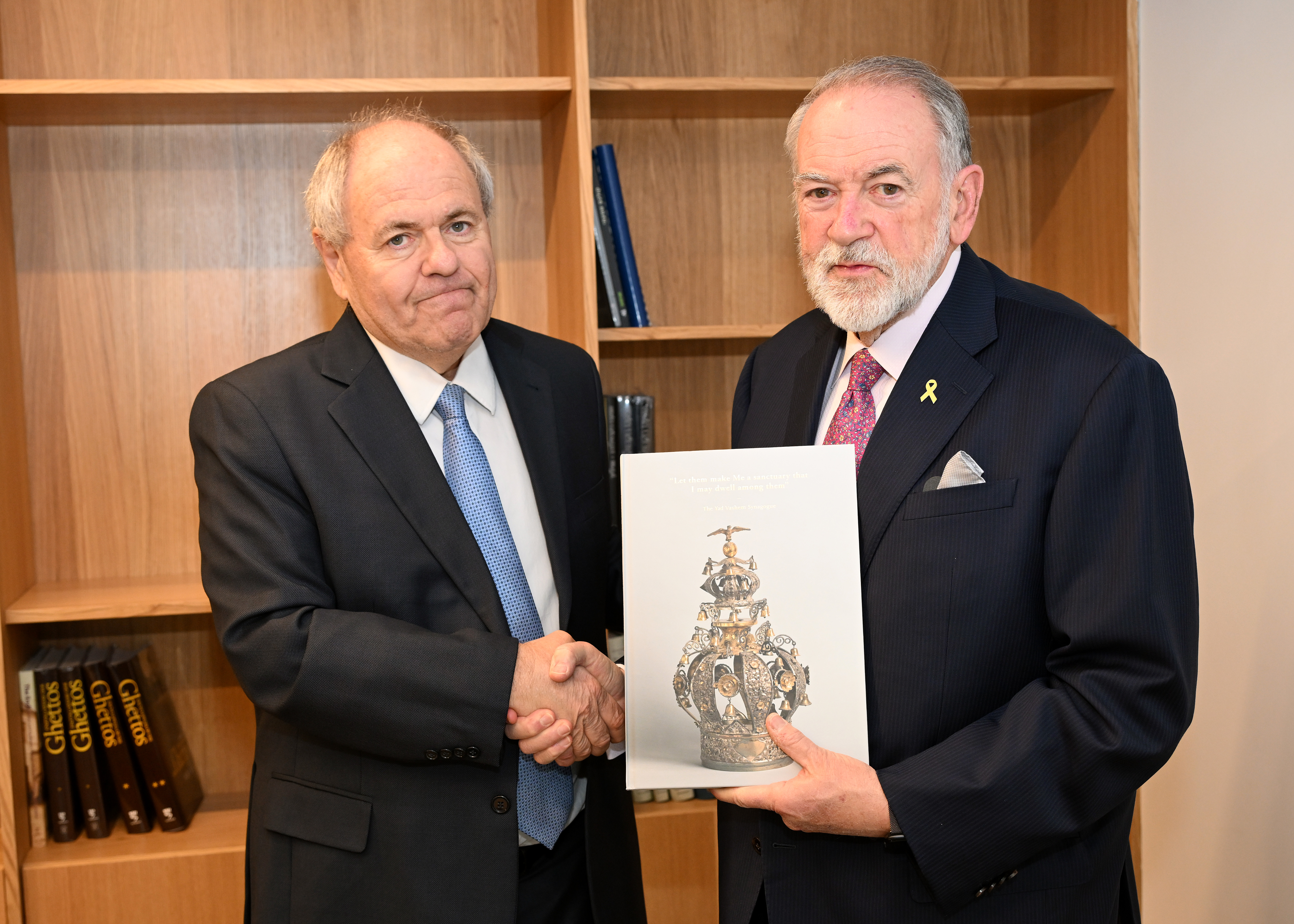
Huckabee as ambassador to Israel and Dani Dayan in 2025

Mike Huckabee has served as the United States Ambassador to Israel since 2025. He previously had served as the Governor of Arkansas (1996–2007) and was an unsuccessful candidate for the Republican Party nomination for President of the United States in the 2008 and 2016 presidential elections.

== Social issues ==
=== Abortion ===
Huckabee opposes any public funding for abortion, and believes that abortion should be legal only when the life of the mother is at risk. He believes that it would "most certainly" be a good day for America if Roe v. Wade were repealed.

In a 2006 interview, Huckabee said that the legality of abortion "should be left to the states." However, in November 2007 he told Fox News that the federal government should outlaw abortion, stating, "For those of us for whom this is a moral question, you can't simply have 50 different versions of what's right".

In one 1996 case, the abortion clinic that performed an abortion on a 15-year-old Arkansas girl who was allegedly raped by her stepfather was denied Medicaid reimbursement by Huckabee. The State of Arkansas was involved in a lawsuit to determine whether the state would be required to stop accepting Medicaid benefits from the federal government due to a discrepancy between state and federal law. Arkansas voters had approved a 1988 amendment to the state constitution banning public funding for abortions except to save the life of the mother. This was in harmony with the federal law at the time. Federal laws changed in 1993, mandating that Medicaid funds also be used for abortions in cases of rape and incest. This caused an abortion opponent to file a lawsuit asking that Arkansas be forced to withdraw from Medicaid. The state contended that abortions in cases of rape and incest were being funded by a private trust in order to abide by state law. Huckabee claimed that if Medicaid funds were used in those cases, the state risked losing both the lawsuit and about $900 million in federal funding. Huckabee has indicated that he personally opposes public funding for abortions or for organizations that perform or advocate the procedure. He stated the Supreme Court ruling, Roe v Wade, had created a "holocaust of liberalized abortion".

Roe v. Wade was ultimately overturned in June 2022 by the Supreme Court's ruling in Dobbs v. Jackson Women's Health Organization, which returned the authority to regulate abortion to the states.

=== Crime and drugs ===
Huckabee said that he supports the death penalty, but only reluctantly. He believes that eliminating parole gives no incentive for rehabilitation, and believes that more prisons should be built, and their management should be privatized. As Governor, he granted 1,033 pardons and commutations which is ten times more pardons than Governor Bill Clinton granted during his tenure. He supports flexible federal block grants for crime programs, and supports tougher juvenile crime penalties, but believes that the states should set them. Huckabee supports drug courts for non-violent drug offenders, believes that drug education fails and drug punishment works, and that stricter penalties for drug-related crimes should be enforced. He opposes the medical use of marijuana, and said he would continue to raid, arrest, prosecute, and imprison patients who are using marijuana as a medicine.

=== Education ===
Huckabee believes that "education is empowerment. The lack of it leads us to ... all kinds of obstacles in our path." He has also stated that "education is a key for every child."

Huckabee supports incorporating character education into school curricula, displaying the Ten Commandments in schools, and implementing stringent remedial action to correct severely failing schools. While governor of Arkansas, he made conspicuous efforts to protect the rights of parents to homeschool their children, and was rewarded in the subsequent 2008 Republican presidential primaries with enthusiastic support from many homeschool families.

Huckabee was instrumental in implementing standards-based education reforms and academic testing changes in Arkansas. He has described these "standards" reforms by writing, "[i]n 1998 I announced ... the first of several major reform efforts in Arkansas that were to focus on not only increasing funding but, more important, improved results." He has also called for more federal funding of IDEA for the education of disabled students. He supports charter schools.

=== Embryonic stem cell research ===
Huckabee has said that embryonic stem cell research creates life only to end a life. He applauded George W. Bush's veto of legislation meant to loosen federal funding for embryonic stem cell research in June 2007, saying that the bill was wrong on moral grounds and based on inconclusive science. He also said that scientists have developed other types of stem cell research that would not require the use of a human embryo. He said that "vital scientific research can and is being conducted without the destruction of life."

=== Energy independence ===
During his 2008 presidential campaign, Huckabee stated that if elected, he would make the US "energy independent" by the end of a second term. His plan calls for conservation, exploration and the pursuit of alternative energy. He specifically mentions nuclear, wind, solar, hydrogen, clean coal, biodiesel and biomass and he supports federal research and development of these energy sources. Huckabee states that dependence on foreign oil has "not just shaped our foreign policy, it has deformed it". He sees energy independence as vital to an effective foreign policy.

=== Environment ===
Huckabee strongly supported "cap and trade" (also called emissions trading) when running for President in 2007. Speaking at the Cool Air Planet Conference in Oct. 2007 he said, "I also support cap and trade of carbon emissions. And I was disappointed that the Senate rejected a carbon counting system to measure the sources of emissions, because that would have been the first and the most important step toward implementing true cap and trade." In December 2010, Huckabee claimed on his website that he had never supported cap and trade, and responding to those that said he had supported it, "to put it simply, that's just not true." However, given the video that shows him favoring cap and trade, Huckabee's denial was inaccurate. Huckabee has stated that Americans should follow the Scout rule: "leave the earth better than we found it." He supported conserving the Buffalo River in north Arkansas against dams, and supports the State Revolving Loan Fund for flexible clean water. He also supports the national drought policy. As Governor, Huckabee supported a conservation tax for Arkansas parks. In 2007, Huckabee supported a "cap and trade" emissions control program and also stated that confronting global warming is a moral issue. In 2010, however, he said of cap and trade, "I never did support and never would support it—period." As Governor, Huckabee opposed efforts by Oklahoma to reduce water pollution. Oklahoma Attorney General Drew Edmondson had sued Arkansas poultry companies alleging that chicken waste fouled Oklahoma rivers. He has said that "Republicans ought to be leading the way to be better stewards on the environment, and we're not."

=== Gun laws ===
Huckabee has voiced his support for self-defense and the Castle Doctrine, and has generally taken an anti-gun control stance. He believes that the concealed carrying of weapons should be allowed. He has said that whenever he hears people start talking about hunting when referring to the Second Amendment, he realizes they do not know what they are talking about, because the Second Amendment was to allow an armed citizenry the opportunity to protect themselves in case a tyrannical government ever came into power.

=== Health care ===
Huckabee feels that the American health care system focuses too much on treatment and not enough on prevention. He says that America needs a "health" system, not just a "health care" system. He is a strong advocate of healthy living, encouraging Americans to exercise more and eat less.

Huckabee opposed Obama's health care plan, the Affordable Care Act, more commonly known as Obamacare. He stated that he wants to "give citizens more control over their own health care choices".

Huckabee thinks HMOs should not be required to cover people with preexisting conditions.

=== HIV/AIDS ===
Huckabee supports increasing George W. Bush's President's Emergency Plan for AIDS Relief (PEPFAR) from $15 billion to $30 billion over five years.

In his 1992 Senate campaign, Huckabee called for AIDS patients to be isolated from the general public. In response to a candidate questionnaire from the Associated Press, he stated:

If the federal government is truly serious about doing something with the AIDS virus, we need to take steps that would isolate the carriers of this plague. It is difficult to understand the public policy towards AIDS. It is the first time in the history of civilization in which the carriers of a genuine plague have not been isolated from the general population, and in which this deadly disease for which there is no cure is being treated as a civil rights issue instead of the true health crisis it represents.

In the same statement, Huckabee also opposed increasing federal funding for HIV/AIDS research and suggested that Hollywood celebrities should provide additional funds instead. Huckabee now supports additional funding for HIV/AIDS research.

In 2007, facing critics who pointed out that by 1992 it was well known that HIV/AIDS could not be spread by casual contact, Huckabee stood by his earlier view, saying that in 1992 "there was still a great deal of, I think, uncertainty about just how widespread AIDS was, how it could be transmitted. So we know more now than we did in 1992, all of us do—hopefully."

=== Immigration ===
In 2001, Huckabee endorsed the use of foreign workers from Canada and Mexico for agricultural labor.

In 2006, a Mexican consulate opened in Little Rock. Huckabee strongly supported it. Some say his support of the Mexican consulate was illegal.

Huckabee disagrees with aspects of John McCain/Ted Kennedy immigration reform but in a May 16, 2006, Washington Post interview he agreed with George W. Bush's immigration plan, saying:

I tend to think that the rational approach is to find a way to give people a pathway to citizenship. You shouldn't ignore the law or ignore those who break it. But by the same token, I think it's a little disingenuous when I hear people say they should experience the full weight of the law in every respect with no pathway, because that's not something we practice in any other area of criminal justice in this country. ... To think that we're going to go lock up 12 million people, or even round them up and drive them to the border and let them go, might make a great political speech, but it's not going to happen. What should happen, however, is exactly what I think [George W. Bush] has proposed, and that is that we create a process where people make restitution for the fact they have broken the law.

Huckabee argued illegal immigrants pay more in taxes than they receive in benefits: "They pay fuel taxes. If they're using a fake Social Security number, they're paying Social Security taxes and will never receive any benefit. It would be closer to the truth to say they're subsidizing Joe McCutchen and Jim Holt more than the other way around."

In 2007, Huckabee said, "I just don't think it's realistic to say this weekend we're going to round up 12 to 20 million young people and their children and we're going to put them across the border and they're never going to come back." In a 2007 interview, Huckabee argued job loss caused by illegal immigration is not a problem, saying, "You know, when people say, 'they're taking our jobs'—I used to hear that as Governor—and I started asking this question, 'can you name me any person, give me their name, who can't get a job plucking a chicken or picking a tomato or tarring a roof that would like to do that work?' ... I never, ever, had a person who could come up with the name of a person who could not get a job because an illegal immigrant had stepped in front of them because it was either a job that person didn't want to do or didn't exist." Huckabee stated in an interview with National Review, "I have always said you don't punish a child for the crime of a parent. ... Frankly, it's in our best interest to try to get that child on to a higher level of education."

In his opening remarks among Hispanic civil rights leaders at a LULAC convention, Huckabee said the nation will need to address the concerns of the Hispanic community because of its growing influence and population base. "Pretty soon, Southern white guys like me may be in the minority," Huckabee said jokingly as the crowd roared in laughter. He told the LULAC delegates that their presence in the state's capital city was very important because Arkansas has one of the fastest growing Hispanic populations in the nation. "Your gathering is so very significant for our state," Huckabee said.

Roy Beck, founder of NumbersUSA, played a major role in defeating the Senate immigration bill, at first called Huckabee "an absolute disaster as governor of Arkansas ... Every time there was any enforcement in his state, he took the side of the illegal aliens." At the time, Huckabee responded by saying if voters are looking for the toughest guy on immigration, he's not their man. Beck was "pleased" with Huckabee's improvement on this issue, after Huckabee officially spelled out his position to require illegals to go to the "back of the line" before returning.

In October 2007 Huckabee said, "We need to make it clear that we will say no to amnesty, and no to sanctuary cities, and no to the idea that there can be some complete ignoring of the fact that our laws have been broken." In February 2007, Huckabee had stated, "We shouldn't have amnesty where we just say, "Fine, everybody's good, we're going to let it go." We should have a process where people can pay the penalties, step up and accept responsibility for not being here legally. But here's the point. The objective is not to be punitive. The objective is to make things right. Right for us. Right for them." Huckabee said it's irrational to deport twelve million people and supported a pathway to citizenship.

Later that month, Huckabee suggested abortion is partly to blame for illegal immigration, saying "It might be that for the last 35 years, we have aborted more than a million people who would have been in our workforce", had abortion not been legalized.

During his bid for President, Huckabee released a comprehensive nine-point immigration enforcement and border security plan. His plan includes building a border fence, increased border patrol personnel, and increases in visas for skilled workers who enter the country legally. He has previously stated he is opposed to using military resources for border patrol. Huckabee's plan would also require all 11-12 million illegal immigrants to register with the federal government and return to their home countries within 120 days. Failure to do so would carry a 10-year ban from entering the US. Huckabee's plan was partly modeled on a ten-point plan proposed in 2005 by Mark Krikorian. Krikorian has said he is pleasantly surprised by the plan.

In 2008, after some confusion about whether Huckabee wanted to repeal birthright citizenship, Huckabee issued a statement on the issue:

I do not support an amendment to the Constitution that would prevent children born in the U.S. to illegal aliens from automatically becoming American citizens. I have no intention of supporting a constitutional amendment to deny birthright citizenship.

On January 16, 2008, Huckabee became the first presidential candidate to sign Americans for Better Immigration's No-Amnesty pledge. In response, NumbersUSA raised his rating on illegal immigration to EXCELLENT.

Huckabee continues to speak for the dignity of legal immigrants. In the January 10 Republican debate he said:

The point we need make is that when people do come here, they ought to live with their heads up. They ought to live in the light, not the darkness. They ought to not be afraid of seeing a police car. It's not just in our benefit that we solve this problem. It's in the benefit of those who do come to this country so nobody looks at a person of maybe Hispanic origin and questions whether or not they are legal. We ought to have the assumption that everybody here is legal, that nobody here is illegal.

In February 2011, a bipartisan group of eight mayors from Arizona, Texas, and California, responding to a New York Post op-ed by Huckabee in which he said the Department of Homeland Security had "failed miserably" to secure the borders, released a letter addressed to both Huckabee and the Post.

Huckabee was added to ALIPAC's Cantor List of Republicans that GOP primary voters should reject due to his support for amnesty for illegal immigrants and his documented duplicity on the issue.

=== LGBT rights ===
Huckabee believes that marriage should be between one man and one woman, and he opposes both same-sex marriage and civil unions. He outlawed gay marriage in Arkansas, but in 2007 he stated that Americans should respect gay couples. He says that adoptions should be child focused and opposes gay adoptions.

Huckabee stated in 1992, "I feel homosexuality is an aberrant, unnatural, and sinful lifestyle, and we now know it can pose a dangerous public health risk". He stuck by those comments in December 2007 when asked if homosexuality is sinful. He replied, "Well I believe it would be—just like lying is sinful and stealing is sinful. There are a lot of things that are sinful. It doesn't mean that a person is a horrible person. It means that they engage in behavior that is outside the norms of those boundaries of our traditional view of what's right and what's wrong. So, I think that anybody who has, maybe a traditional worldview of sexuality would classify that as an unusual behavior that is not traditional and that would be outside those bounds."

In 2006, Huckabee stated,

I'm not real fond when people try to tell me that I'm just against same sex marriage. I tell people I'm actually just for keeping marriage in the only manner in which it's even been known in any culture in any civilization throughout all of history, and dear friends, until Moses comes down with two stone tablets from Brokeback Mountain saying he's changed the rules, let's keep it like it is.

In April 2010, whilst speaking to student journalists at The College of New Jersey, Huckabee said that legalizing same-sex marriage would "be like saying, well, there are a lot of people who like to use drugs so let's go ahead and accommodate those who want to use drugs. There are some people who believe in incest, so we should accommodate them. There are people who believe in polygamy, should we accommodate them?"

Huckabee released a 60-second commercial in August 2010 for Pastor Lou Engle's "The Call", in which he exhorted the nation to oppose same-sex marriage and "fast and pray and turn this nation back to God, as Jesus is our only hope."

Huckabee believes that the responsibility of defining marriage should be left up to the states to decide. Huckabee criticized the Obergefell v. Hodges Supreme Court decision legalizing same-sex marriage nationwide, calling the ruling "an out of control act of judicial tyranny", saying "I will not acquiesce to an imperial court".

=== Teaching of evolution ===
Huckabee has voiced his support of intelligent design and he has stated that he does not accept the validity of Darwin's theory of evolution. He was quoted in July 2004 on Arkansans Ask, his regular show on the Arkansas Educational Television Network: "I think that students also should be given exposure to the theories not only of evolution but to the basis of those who believe in creationism." Huckabee has also stated, "I do not necessarily buy into the traditional Darwinian theory, personally." In the Third GOP Debate in June 2007, Huckabee was asked by Tom Fahey whether he believed in evolution, and he responded, in part: "I believe there is a God who was active in the creation process. Now, how did he do it, and when did he do it, and how long did he take? I don't honestly know, and I don't think knowing that would make me a better or a worse president ... if anybody wants to believe that they are the descendants of a primate, they are certainly welcome to do it—I don't know how far they will march that back. ..."

== Economic issues ==
=== Budget and economy ===
Huckabee has said that Wal-Mart is the case study in the genius of the American marketplace. He has said that consumerism is addictive but tranquility is immaterial. He increased state spending 0.91% percent from 1996 to 2004. During his tenure, the number of state government workers in Arkansas increased over 20 percent, and the state's general obligation debt increased by approximately $1 billion. As Governor of Arkansas, Huckabee received grades of B in 1998, C in 2000, C in 2002, D in 2004, and F in 2006 from the Cato Institute, a libertarian think tank, in their biennial Fiscal Policy Report Card on America's Governors.

=== Campaign finance ===
Huckabee stated on the topic of campaign finance, "I think the best system, and to me the most American, is don't create a lot of prohibitions but create full disclosure."

=== Trade ===
Huckabee has not outlined other clear positions on trade, but has said that he thinks that globalization can be done fairly and that Americans are losing jobs because of an "unlevel, unfair trading arena that needs to be fixed."

In his book From Hope to Higher Ground, Huckabee expressed support for free trade, but only if it is "fair trade". He identified excess litigation, excess taxation, and excess regulation as three factors contributing to the loss of American jobs.

== National security and foreign policy ==
=== Size of the military and defense spending ===
Huckabee supports a larger military and a fifty percent increase in defense spending. In December 2007, he wrote:

The Bush administration plans to increase the size of the U.S. Army and the Marine Corps by about 92,000 troops over the next five years. We can and must do this in two to three years. I recognize the challenges of increasing our enlistments without lowering standards and of expanding training facilities and personnel, and that is one of the reasons why we must increase our military budget. Right now, we spend about 3.9 percent of our GDP on defense, compared with about six percent in 1986, under President Ronald Reagan. We need to return to that six percent level.

=== Tax reform ===
The 1999 gas and fuel tax hikes were never on the ballot in Arkansas, but Huckabee has told reporters "the fuel tax was a vote of the people—eighty percent of the people voted to improve roads", and his 2008 presidential campaign manager, Chip Saltsman, has stated that "more than 80% of the voters supported a four cent tax on diesel fuel to fix the roads" and that through the same process voters approved a tax increasing the sales tax by an eighth of a cent to preserve their natural and cultural heritage. Saltsman has said that it would have been in violation of Governor Huckabee's oath of office to override the voters with respect to the referendums, and concluded that the citizens were responsible for the increases in taxation. However the tax increase was signed into law over two months before the voters approved a bond issue which did not include the gas tax increases.

In January 2007 on Meet the Press, Huckabee said "I think you've got to be very careful. I wouldn't propose any new taxes. I wouldn't support any. But if we're in a situation where we are in a different level of war, where there is no other option, I think that it's a very dangerous position to make pledges that are outside the most important pledge you make, and that is the oath you take to uphold the Constitution and protect the people of the United States." Grover Norquist, the president of Americans for Tax Reform, who in 2006 called the governor a "serial tax increaser," stated recently, "Gov. Huckabee recognizes that the challenge is to rein in spending and reduce taxes." Huckabee supports the FairTax, which would do away with all federal taxes and replace them with a single national sales tax. In March 2007, Huckabee signed the Presidential Taxpayer Protection Pledge of Americans for Tax Reform, promising not to increase taxes at the federal level. Huckabee cut taxes while governor, which saved Arkansas' citizens close to $380 million. For 2007, his state enjoyed a surplus of nearly $850 million.

Huckabee has voiced support for the FairTax system, and wants to eliminate the Internal Revenue Service. He has called FairTax the flatter, fairer, finite, family friendly overhaul. Ann Coulter was quoted saying, "The problem with the fair tax is that it's so conservative it would never be implemented..." Rudy Giuliani criticized the fair tax saying "This would not be a good time—I don't know if there would ever be a good time to do this—to advocate ending the home mortgage deduction. The home mortgage deduction is considered by many critical to the ability of people to buy a home and keep their home."

Huckabee lowered taxes 94 times, although critics claim that most of these were small deductions that the legislature initiated. He supported the removal of the poorest taxpayers from the tax rolls. He was also criticized for his fiscal record. Huckabee supported 5 tax increases, prompting the Club for Growth to label him a liberal. He signed bills raising taxes on gasoline in 1999, a $5.25 bed-tax on private nursing home patients in 2001, and publicly opposed the repeal of a sales tax on groceries and medicine in 2002. He believes that states should independently determine estate taxes.

== Foreign policy ==
=== Armenia ===
Huckabee issued a proclamation declaring April 24, 2001, as "Day of Remembrance of the Armenian genocide."

=== Afghanistan ===
Huckabee is supportive of the War in Afghanistan, and says that the war should not be judged while the United States is in the midst of it.

=== Guantanamo Bay ===
Huckabee has expressed concern that Guantanamo Bay detention camp is a distraction from the Global War on Terror. Previously, he stated, "[Guantanamo is] more symbolic than it is a substantive issue because people perceive of mistreatment when in fact there are extraordinary means being taken to make sure these detainees are being given really every consideration".

=== Iran ===
Huckabee has criticized the Bush administration for "only proceeding down one track with Iran: armed conflict". He noted that the US has "[not] had diplomatic relations with Iran in almost 30 years, and a lot of good it's done". Huckabee is willing to consider using military force against Iran. He wrote: "The Bush administration has properly said that it will not take the military option for dealing with Iran off the table. Neither will I."

Speaking with Breitbart News in 2015 on the recent Iranian nuclear deal, he said: "This president's foreign policy is the most feckless in American history. It is so naive that he would trust the Iranians. By doing so, he will take the Israelis and march them to the door of the oven." These comments were considered a reference to the systematic gassing of Jews in Nazi Germany and as deeply offensive by Mika Brzezinski of MSNBC, who said that:

If you've been to Auschwitz, if you've been to Birkenau, if you've been to any of these places where people were killed and you see the piles of glasses, the piles of hair, the piles of shoes and the piles of clothes, and every bit of their humanity that had to be stripped away, handed over as they went and burned to their deaths among other things, it's really not a good comment to say. It's a deal breaker! It should be over for him. You don't say that.

=== Israel and Palestine ===
Huckabee calls Israel an "ally", "America's greatest friend in the region", and says Israel should have access to advanced weapons and technology. He is a Christian Zionist politician, and has written that, "the Jews have a God-given right to reclaim land given to their ancestors and taken away from them."

Huckabee opposes the notion of Palestinian statehood in the Holy Land. Huckabee encourages West Bank settlements which are illegal under international law, and has gone so far as to deny Israel's existing military occupation in the region. In 2017, at an event in the West Bank, he stated: "There is no such thing as a West Bank - it's Judea and Samaria. There's no such thing as a settlement. They're communities. They're neighborhoods. They're cities. There's no such thing as an occupation."

Huckabee first visited Israel as a teenager, and has returned numerous times since then. During some of his visits he expressed his support for Israeli settlements in the Israeli-occupied West Bank, stating that Jews "should be able to live in their own country."

He has advocated for the release of convicted Israeli spy Jonathan Pollard.

Huckabee supports Greater Israel, stating in 2026 that he supported the expansion of Israeli territory from the Nile to the Euphrates rivers, based off an Old Testament passage.

Huckabee was nominated by President-elect Donald Trump in November 2024 to serve as U.S. Ambassador to Israel, and was confirmed by the United States Senate on April 9, 2025.

=== Fight against global disease ===
Huckabee supports increasing President's Emergency Plan for AIDS Relief (PEPFAR) from $15 billion to $30 billion over five years. He also supports more funding to fight tuberculosis and malaria.

== Religion ==
Huckabee, an ordained Southern Baptist minister, has highlighted his religious views during his time as governor, and in some of his presidential campaign advertisements. He has called himself the "Christian Leader", and suggested that being a pastor is "pretty good preparation to lead a country." Critics, including presidential rival Mitt Romney, have accused Huckabee of using the religion issue for political advantage, pointing out that otherwise identical ads often do not include the "Christian Leader" claim.

In 1998, Huckabee said, "I got into politics because I knew government didn't have the real answers, that the real answers lie in accepting Jesus Christ into our lives." The same year he endorsed the Baptist convention's statement of beliefs on marriage that "[t]he husband and wife are of equal worth before God, since both are created in God's image," signing a full-page ad in USA Today in support of the statement with 129 other evangelical leaders. In 1998 he also stated, "Politics are totally directed by worldview. That's why when people say, 'We ought to separate politics from religion,' I say to separate the two is absolutely impossible".

On the campaign trail in 2007, Huckabee told a Dallas Baptist church, "If you're with Jesus Christ, we know how it turns out in the final moment. I've read the last chapter in the book, and we do end up winning."

A month later, Huckabee credited divine intervention for his improving presidential poll numbers. "There's only one explanation for it," Huckabee said, "and it's not a human one. It's the same power that helped a little boy with two fish and five loaves feed a crowd of 5,000 people."

In December 2007, Huckabee was accused by many media outlets of including a subliminal image of a cross in the background of his Christmas campaign advertisement.

On NBC's Meet The Press on December 31, 2007, Huckabee stood by a decade-old comment in which he said, "I hope we answer the alarm clock and take this nation back for Christ." In the same interview he said if elected, he would have no problem appointing atheists to government posts.

On January 14, 2008, he condemned the Constitution's establishment clause, stating "I believe it's a lot easier to change the Constitution than it would be to change the word of the living God. And that's what we need to do—to amend the Constitution so it's in God's standards rather than try to change God's standards so it lines up with some contemporary view." He later clarified this as referring to the "right to life" amendment that has been part of the Republican platform since 1980, and his support for a constitutional amendment against same-sex marriage.

== Electoral issues ==
=== Election of senators ===
On July 28, 2017, after the Health Care Freedom Act was rejected by the Senate due to three GOP senators, John McCain, Susan Collins and Lisa Murkowski voting against the repeal, Huckabee called for the repeal of the direct election of Senators by the 17th Amendment, tweeting "Time to repeal 17th Amendment. Founders had it right-Senators chosen by state legislatures. Will work for their states and respect 10th amid [sic]". He later also tweeted, "Ignorance of history of 17th Amendment is revealed by response to my earlier Tweet. Direct election of Senate is major cause of swamp," as a reference to one of President Donald Trump's slogans "Drain the swamp".

== See also ==
- Mike Huckabee
- Mike Huckabee presidential campaign, 2008
- 2008 United States presidential election
