= David Ehrenstein =

American critic (1947–2025)

David Ehrenstein (February 18, 1947 – March 12, 2025) was an American critic who focused primarily on gay issues in cinema.

== Life and career ==
Ehrenstein was born in New York City on February 18, 1947. His father was Jewish with Polish ancestors, and his mother was half-Black and half-Irish. His mother raised him in her religion, Roman Catholicism. He attended the High School of Music and Art (different from the Fiorello H. LaGuardia High School of Music & Art and Performing Arts) and then Pace College (now Pace University). He lived in Los Angeles and was openly gay.

His writing career started in 1965 with an interview with Andy Warhol which was published in Film Culture magazine in 1966. Ehrenstein wrote for Film Culture until 1983. During the 1960s he also wrote for December and the Village Voice. In 1976 he moved to Los Angeles with his partner Bill Reed and began work as a film critic and entertainment journalist for the Los Angeles Herald-Examiner and also wrote for Film Comment and Film Quarterly during this period.

In 1982 he collaborated with Bill Reed on the book Rock On Film, while continuing to write for diverse publications, including the San Francisco Examiner, Rolling Stone, Cahiers du Cinéma, Arts, the Los Angeles Reader, Enclitic, and Wide Angle. From the Herald-Examiner he moved to Daily Variety and later The Advocate. He also wrote Film: The Front Line - 1984, a survey of experimental and independent film work. He has contributed to Sight and Sound.

In 1987 he served as the film researcher and historian for the "Hollywood and History" costume exhibition at the Los Angeles County Museum of Art. In 1992 he published The Scorsese Picture: The Art and Life of Martin Scorsese. In 1998 he published Open Secret: Gay Hollywood 1927-1997. As he documents on his blog and website, lawyers representing Hollywood actor Tom Cruise threatened to take legal action against Ehrenstein because he wrote of how Cruise is appealing to both men and women.

Ehrenstein appeared often on The E! True Hollywood Story, specifically for the profiles of Rock Hudson, Sonny Bono, and Bob Guccione. He also wrote about the film Brokeback Mountain for LA Weekly. His homepage and blog also contain commentary and satire on various journalists, politicians and figures in the entertainment industry.

Ehrenstein died on March 11, 2025, at the age of 78.

== "Obama the 'Magic Negro'" ==
In March 2007, Ehrenstein wrote an opinion piece on Barack Obama, in which he used the archetype of the magical negro to describe Obama, who was then an Illinois senator and candidate for the Democratic Party's nomination for president. The title of the piece, "Obama the 'Magic Negro'", was later used in a musical parody called "Barack the Magic Negro" by conservative satirist Paul Shanklin. This piece of music caused some controversy in late December, 2008, when compact discs featuring the song were distributed by Tennessee political activist Chip Saltsman (a candidate for chairman of the Republican National Committee) to various Republican Party activists as Christmas gifts.

Part of Saltsman's response to the controversy was that the song was actually a parody of Ehrenstein's "irresponsible" column itself, rather than a parody of Obama. Ehrenstein responded to the controversy in late December stating, "As everyone knows Whites feel no guilt about America's racist history whatsoever. All they care about is the appearance of politesse — the slimy veneer of 'good manners.' Clearly the Republican party is 'split' over what to do in the wake of having lost so much political capital. Chip and his ilk want to continue making childish attacks. Others in the party seek to turn chicken shit into chicken salad by claiming Obama is the second coming of Ronald Reagan."
