= Paul Shanklin =

American entertainer (born 1962)

Paul Shanklin (born 1962 in Memphis, Tennessee) is an American conservative political satirist, impressionist, comedian, and conservative speaker. Shanklin wrote and voiced the characters for the songs and satirical comedy segments used by conservative radio host Rush Limbaugh.

Shanklin first came to media attention after doing his vocal impersonation of then-President of the United States Bill Clinton for Memphis radio show host "The Big Kahuna", Bill Young. Shanklin was brought to the attention of Limbaugh by announcer Johnny Donovan, and was first featured on Limbaugh's show in May 1993.

One of Shanklin's most controversial works was his 2007 parody "Barack the Magic Negro", in which he impersonates Al Sharpton lamenting that white voters will perceive Barack Obama as a "magic negro" and therefore favor Obama for president over him. This was based on a column titled "Obama the 'Magic Negro'" by black columnist David Ehrenstein in the Los Angeles Times. The inclusion of this song on a CD by Republican National Committee chairman candidate Chip Saltsman in 2008 caused some consternation, resulting in him withdrawing his candidacy.

Shanklin has released a total of 15 albums of political parody and has performed over 1,900 parody songs and skits for Limbaugh incorporating over 80 voice impressions.

== Discography ==
=== Albums ===
- Bill Clinton: The Early Years
- Bill Clinton: The Comeback Kid Tour
- This Land Was Your Land
- Executive Privileges
- Simply Reprehensible
- Vice Vice Baby
- The Usual Suspects
- Mama Told Me Not to Run
- Talk Radio Classics Vol 1
- Talk Radio Classics Vol 2
- Holiday Classics (2006)
- American Spastic (2006)
- We Hate the USA (2008)
- You Didn't Build That (2009)
- Songs of the Revolution (2010)
