= Magical Negro =

Stock character who helps white protagonists

The Magical Negro (also magic Negro or mystical Negro, with varying capitalization) is a trope in American cinema, television, and literature. In the cinema of the United States, the Magical Negro is a supporting stock character who comes to the aid of the (usually white) protagonists in a film. Magical Negro characters, often possessing special insight or mystical powers, have long been a tradition in American fiction. The old-fashioned word "Negro" is used to imply that a "magical Black character" who devotes himself to selflessly helping whites is a throwback to racist stereotypes such as the "Sambo" or "noble savage".

The term was popularized in 2001 by film director Spike Lee during a lecture tour of college campuses, in which he expressed his dismay that Hollywood continued to employ this premise. He specially noted the films The Green Mile and The Legend of Bagger Vance, which featured "super-duper magical Negro" characters.

== Usage ==
=== Fiction and film ===
The Magical Negro is a trope in cinema, television, and literature: the character is typically, but not always, "in some way outwardly or inwardly disabled, either by discrimination, disability or social constraint". The "Negro" is often a janitor or prisoner. The character often has no past but simply appears one day to help the white protagonist. They usually have some sort of magical power, "rather vaguely defined but not the sort of thing one typically encounters." The character is patient and wise, often dispensing various words of wisdom, and is "closer to the earth". The character will also do almost anything, including sacrificing themselves, to save the white protagonist, as exemplified in The Defiant Ones, in which Sidney Poitier plays the prototypical Magical Negro.

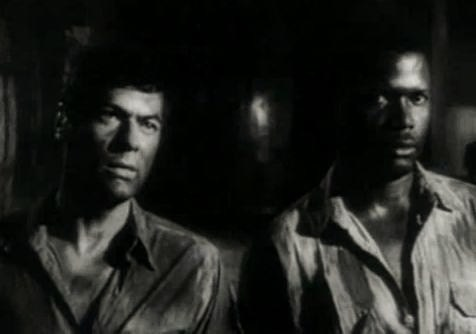
Screenshot with Tony Curtis and Sidney Poitier from 1958 Hollywood film The Defiant Ones

Film critic Matt Zoller Seitz stated that the trope "takes a subject that some white folks find unpleasant or even troubling to ponder (imagining that resentful black people's status in a country that, 50 years after the start of the modern civil rights struggle, is still run by, and mostly for, whites) and turns it into a source of gentle reassurance". Film reviewer Audrey Colombe argues that the trope has been perpetuated by the overwhelmingly White blockbuster film industry. Film director and writer Spike Lee said in 2001 that the White-dominated film industry is "still doing the same old thing ... recycling the noble savage and the happy slave".

Racism historians Francisco Bethencourt and John Beusterien trace the trope to late fifteenth century and early sixteenth century Spanish comedias de negros and their depiction of black "savior soldiers", who reinforce the stereotype of the supposed greater physical strength of Africans. These include El prodigio de Etiopía and El negro del mejor amo by Lope de Vega and El valiente negro en Flandes by Andrés de Claramonte.

Christopher John Farley, referring to the magical Negro as "Magical African American Friends" (MAAFs), says they are rooted in screenwriters' ignorance of African Americans:

MAAFs exist because most Hollywood screenwriters don't know much about black people other than what they hear on records by white hip-hop star Eminem. So instead of getting life histories or love interests, black characters get magical powers.

The Magical Negro stereotype serves as a plot device to help the white protagonist get out of trouble, typically through helping the white character recognize his own faults and overcome them and teaching him to be a better person. Although the character may have magical powers, the "magic is ostensibly directed toward helping and enlightening a white male character". An article in a 2009 edition of the journal Social Problems stated the Magical Negro was an expression of racial profiling within the United States:

These powers are used to save and transform disheveled, uncultured, lost, or broken whites (almost exclusively white men) into competent, successful, and content people within the context of the American myth of redemption and salvation. It is this feature of the Magical Negro that some people find most troubling. Although from a certain perspective the character may seem to be showing blacks in a positive light, the character is still ultimately subordinate to whites. He or she is also regarded as an exception, allowing white America to like individual black people but not black culture.

In 2001, Spike Lee used the term in a series of talks on college campuses to criticize the stereotypical, unreal roles created for black men in films that were recent at that time, naming The Family Man (2000), What Dreams May Come (1998), The Legend of Bagger Vance (2000), and The Green Mile (1999) as examples. Talking about the time and place in which Bagger Vance is set, he said:

Blacks are getting lynched left and right, and [Bagger Vance is] more concerned about improving Matt Damon's golf swing! ... I gotta sit down; I get mad just thinking about it. They're still doing the same old thing ... recycling the noble savage and the happy slave.

He went on to discuss his desire to create films showing black people doing all kinds of things.

In a book published in 2004, writer Krin Gabbard claimed that the Oda Mae Brown character in the 1990 movie Ghost, played by Whoopi Goldberg, was an example of a Magical Negress.

In 2012, writer Kia Miakka Natisse discussed actor Morgan Freeman playing parts conforming to the Magical Negro form, such as "a doctor who creates a prosthetic tail for a dolphin (in Dolphin Tale), and an ailing CIA mentor (in Red) – in both roles he reprises the Magical Negro type, coming to save the day for his imperiled white counterparts. One could argue his gadget guru in The Dark Knight Rises fits under that same umbrella."

Chris Rock made references to the trope on his show The Chris Rock Show, including one critical of The Legend of Bagger Vance, entitled "Migger, the Magic Nigger". Keegan-Michael Key and Jordan Peele, of MADtv and Key and Peele fame, followed suit in both shows with their own critical Magical Negro sketches.

The 2019 indie film Cold Brook, written and directed by William Fichtner, includes a Magical Negro named Gil Le Doux, played by Harold Perrineau. The role is a century-old trapped ghost who is saved by two middle-aged men experiencing midlife crises.

The 2024 film The American Society of Magical Negroes critiques and satirizes the magical negro trope by portraying a secret society of African-Americans who make it their job to keep White people comfortable. The film was not well-received, with critiques of it being too safe to make any commentary.

=== Barack Obama ===
In March 2007, American critic David Ehrenstein used the title "Obama the 'Magic Negro'" for an editorial he wrote for the Los Angeles Times, in which he described Barack Obama's image in white American culture:

He's there to assuage white 'guilt' (i.e., the "minimal discomfort" they feel) over the role of slavery and racial segregation in American history, while replacing stereotypes of a dangerous, highly sexualized black man with a benign figure for whom interracial sexual congress holds no interest ... The only mud that momentarily stuck was criticism (white and black alike) concerning Obama's alleged 'inauthenticity', as compared to such sterling examples of "genuine" blackness as Al Sharpton and Snoop Dogg. ... Obama's fame right now has little to do with his political record ... Like a comic-book superhero, Obama is there to help, out of the sheer goodness of a heart we need not know or understand. For as with all Magic Negroes, the less real he seems, the more desirable he becomes. If he were real, white America couldn't project all its fantasies of curative black benevolence on him.

Discussing the Ehrenstein editorial at length, Rush Limbaugh at one point sang the words, "Barack the magic negro" to the tune of song "Puff, the Magic Dragon". Shortly after that Paul Shanklin recorded a song about Barack the Magic Negro set to that same tune, which Limbaugh played numerous times throughout the 2008 presidential election season. In Christmas 2008, Chip Saltsman, a Republican politician and chair of the Tennessee Republican Party, sent a 41-track CD containing the song to members of the Republican National Committee during the Republican National Committee chairmanship election. Saltsman's campaign imploded as a result of the controversy caused by the CD, and he withdrew from the race.

In May 2015, theater and cultural critic Frank Rich, looking back at the coincidence of the 2015 Baltimore protests with the annual White House Correspondents' dinner in Washington, DC, wrote: "What made this particular instance poignant was the presence in the ballroom of our first African-American president, the Magic Negro who was somehow expected to relieve a nation founded and built on slavery from the toxic burdens of centuries of history."

== See also ==
- Black Girl Magic
- Counterstereotype
- Donor (fairy tale)
- John Henryism
- Mammy stereotype
- Manic Pixie Dream Girl
- Mary Sue
- Model minority
- Primitivism
- Romantic racism
- Stereotypes of African Americans
- The American Society of Magical Negroes
- Uncle Tom
- Xenocentrism
- White savior narrative in film
- Uncle Remus
