= Salzman =

Salzman is a German surname meaning "salt-man". It may also appear as Salzmann or Saltzman. Notable people with this surname include:

== Salzman ==
- Eric Salzman (1933–2017), American musicologist and composer
- Herbert Salzman (1916–1990), American businessman and US Ambassador to the Organisation for Economic Co-operation and Development
- J. R. Salzman, champion logroller and Iraq War veteran
- Linda Salzman Sagan (1940–2023), American artist and writer
- Louis Francis Salzman (1878–1971), British historian
- Lorna Salzman, American environmental activist, writer, lecturer, and organizer
- Mark Salzman (born 1959), American writer
- Michelle Salzman (born 1977), American politician
- Michele R. Salzman (born 1952), American historian
- Pnina Salzman (1922–2006), Israeli prize-winning pianist
- Peter J. Salzman, hacker
- Marian Salzman (born 1959), American businesswoman
- Nancy Salzman (born 1954), American co-founder of NXIVM cult

== Salzmann ==
- Christian Gotthilf Salzmann (1744–1811), priest and educationalist
- Jodok Salzmann (born 1995), Austrian cyclist
- Joseph Salzmann (1819–1874), priest, rector of Saint Francis de Sales Seminary (1819–1874)
- Marianna Salzmann (born 1985), German playwright, essayist, theatre curator and novelist
- Richard Salzmann (1929–2023), Czech banker and politician
- Felix Salten (1869–1945), Austrian writer, born Siegmund Salzmann

== Saltzman ==
- Arnold A. Saltzman (1916–2014), American businessman, diplomat, art collector, and philanthropist
- Avery Saltzman, Canadian actor and theater director
- B. Chance Saltzman, United States Space Force general and Chief of Space Operations
- Buddy Saltzman (1924–2012), American drummer
- Charles E. Saltzman (1903–1994), American soldier, businessman and U.S. State Department official
- Charles McKinley Saltzman (1871–1942), American major general
- Dan Saltzman, Portland, Oregon city councilman
- Devyani Saltzman (born 1980), Canadian writer
- Elliot Saltzman, American psychologist
- Harry Saltzman (1915–1994), Canadian theater- and film-producer
- Kathy Saltzman (born 1955), Minnesota politician
- Linda Saltzman (1949–2005), American public health researcher
- Lisa Saltzman, American photographer
- Mark Saltzman, American script writer
- Murray Saltzman (1929–2010), American Reform rabbi and civil rights leader
- Paul Saltzman, Canadian film director-producer and author
- Percy Saltzman (1915–2007), Canadian TV meteorologist
- Philip Saltzman (1928–2009), American executive producer and television writer
- W. Mark Saltzman (born 1959), American biomedical engineer

== See also ==
- Saltsman, a surname
