= Saltman (surname) =

Saltman is an English surname. Notable people with the surname include:

- Benjamin Saltman (1927–1999), American poet and academic
- David Saltman (born 1946), American writer
- Elliot Saltman (born 1982), Scottish golfer
- Lloyd Saltman (born 1985), Scottish golfer
- Paul Saltman (1928–1999), American biologist
- Shelly Saltman (1931–2019), American sports promoter

== See also ==
- Zaltzman (surname)
- Saltsman
