= Jim Gilmore 2008 presidential campaign =

Campaign for the presidency of US

JIM GILMORE FOR PRESIDENT
- Campaign: U.S. presidential election, 2008
- Candidate: Jim Gilmore; Governor of Virginia (1998–2002)
- Affiliation: Republican Party
- Status: Withdrawn
- Headquarters: Springfield, VA
- Key people: Kieran Mahoney (National Consultant); Danny Adams (Treasurer)
- Receipts: US$0.358 (2007-01-31)

Website
- Gilmore For President (archived May 9, 2007)

The 2008 presidential campaign of Jim Gilmore, 68th Governor of Virginia and Chairman of the Republican National Committee began after being drafted to run by his peers in January 2007. He officially began the campaign in April after filing papers with the Federal Election Commission. Gilmore was committed to conservative principles throughout his run, which ultimately ended in July 2007 due to a lack of sufficient funding. The campaign led to Gilmore's decision to run in the 2008 Virginia Senatorial race, which he lost to Democrat Mark Warner.

== Early stages ==
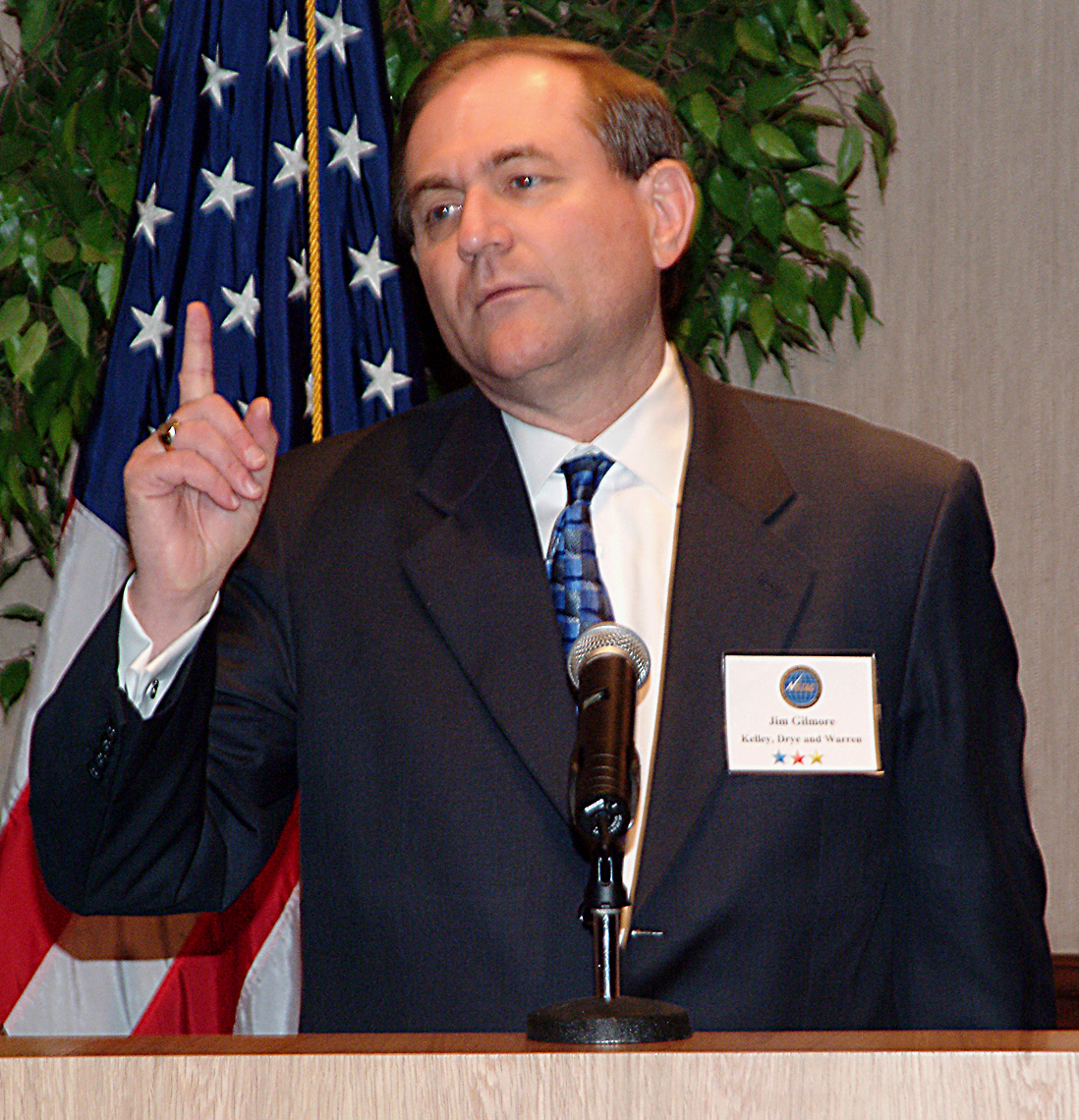
2008 Presidential candidate Jim Gilmore taking questions during a 2004 National Security Telecommunications Advisory Committee meeting

In August 2006, an effort arose to convince Jim Gilmore to run for president of the United States in 2008. The volunteers cited Gilmore's past experiences as qualifications for the job including his service as a counter-intelligence officer for the U.S. army, his post of attorney general of Virginia, his services as chairman of the Gilmore Commission and the National Council on Readiness and Preparedness, as well as his role as president of the non-profit homeland security think-tank USA Secure.

Gilmore decided to listen to the draft efforts, and weighed a possible presidential run when he became the sixth Republican to enact an exploratory committee on January 10, 2007. During his announcement, Gilmore cast himself as a "mainstream Reagan conservative that has always kept his promises" alluding to his record of tax cuts as Governor of Virginia.

On March 14, Gilmore attended his first forum along with other, mostly Democratic presidential candidates. The meeting addressed the International Association of Fire Fighters labor union. Gilmore discussed how his policies as president would "be supportive of the troops" in Iraq and Afghanistan, and that he agreed with the policy for a troop surge in Iraq. Gilmore received no applause from the crowd after making the latter comment.

At the end of March, it was revealed that Gilmore had raised $200,000 for his exploratory committee.

Early in April, Gilmore coined the term "Rudy McRomney" to describe the three Republican frontrunners, whom he labeled as liberals during a forum in Des Moines, Iowa. On April 16, ten days prior to his official announcement, polling results revealed that Gilmore hovered between 1% and 2% support among the Republican electorate. A Washington Post-ABC News poll found that Gilmore was in twelfth place among Republicans with 1% of participants, compared to 0% in February and 1% in January. Somewhat promising results showed that among Newt Gingrich supporters, Gilmore had 2% support; up from 0% in February.

== Campaign developments ==
On April 26, 2007, Gilmore announced his candidacy for president via webcast on his campaign website. He described this method of communication as the "wave of the future" through which he could "talk directly to the people as [he] develop[ed] the campaign." Gilmore stated that as a dark horse candidate it would be beneficial for him to take advantage of the internet as a campaign tool to reach larger audiences without the cost associated with travel.

Gilmore speaking during the first GOP debate

On May 3, Gilmore participated in the first televised GOP debate featured on MSNBC at the Ronald Reagan Presidential Library in Simi Valley, California. The first question he received regarded the Iraq War, which he defended, stating that it represented the "entire Middle East issue" which he described as a "fundamental problem" that he connected to the conflict between Palestinians and Israelis. During an exchange with California Representative Duncan Hunter, Gilmore expressed the responsibility to capture Osama bin Laden and to fight terrorism with the help from allies and to use diplomacy to end the "sea of hostility" that he believed existed from "Morocco, all the way through the Middle East, [and] all the way to the Philippines." Later in the debate, he announced his disagreement with a possible constitutional amendment to give naturalized citizens such as California Governor Arnold Schwarzenegger, the ability to run for president. On abortion, Gilmore confirmed his support for a woman's right to an abortion in the first eight to twelve weeks of pregnancy, but commented that he operated as a pro-life governor. He affirmed his opposition to stem-cell research. At the end of the debate, Gilmore asserted his attributes as a "consistent Conservative" while surprising many when he stated that he would not pardon Scooter Libby. He established his opposition to a National Identification Card, and highlighted the need to be "vigorous on the war on terror", focus on homeland security, and become energy independent in the next presidency.

Gilmore participated in his second debate on May 15 in South Carolina broadcast by Fox News. His first question concerned the perceived growing threat of a nuclear armed Iran. Gilmore thanked the questioner on the basis that he believed the "Middle East issue" should be looked at beyond Iraq. He stated that as president he would join with American allies to put "serious mandatory sanctions" on the regime to let them know "that it is better for them to give up this sort of plan (Nuclear proliferation)." After receiving a question about Social Security, Gilmore changed the subject to address his record of cutting taxes as Governor of Virginia. He would later attack fellow candidates: Rudy Giuliani for his pro-choice positions, former Arkansas Governor Mike Huckabee for his record on taxes, and Mitt Romney for his position on health care. When asked about potential terrorist attacks, Gilmore reminded the audience that he was governor when The Pentagon was attacked on 9/11 and that he has "the experience to deal with these issues." At the end of the debate, Gilmore addressed the issue of race when asked why no minorities where present on the stage running for the presidency, he reacted to this question by declaring that the Republican Party has "people that are prepared to [run] in the immediate future". He also cited his own credentials on race stating that as attorney general of Virginia he faced the issue when he had to deal with the burning of African-American churches, which gave him a good standing with the African-American community in his own judgment.

On May 18, Gilmore appeared on the MSNBC program Tucker, hosted by Tucker Carlson. When alerted about the situation in Iraq, Gilmore made the assessment that when Iraq was invaded the president probably did not think American troops would be trying to control the streets in Baghdad at this point. He stated that it is in the interest of Americans to remain in Iraq and be involved in the "Middle East issue" because if not, America is "going to end up with a major war". Later in the interview when Gilmore was asked if he believed Attorney General Alberto Gonzales was credible, he stated, "No, I don't think he is particularly credible". On May 27, Gilmore appeared on ABC's This Week and continued the strategy of attacking his opponents in the race for president. On the show, he criticized the credentials of former Senator and potential candidate Fred Thompson of Tennessee. He reminded the audience that Thompson is "a one-term senator" and that "he's well known because of his Law & Order appearance. But the question is, is there a solid, consistent record there of supporting conservative principles?"

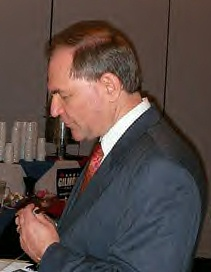
Gilmore at a campaign event in Des Moines, April 2007

Gilmore participated in his final debate on June 5 in Goffstown, New Hampshire telecast by CNN. During this debate, Gilmore spoke less than all of his nine fellow candidates. After Kansas Senator Sam Brownback stated that he did not read the National Intelligence Estimate on weapons of mass destruction in Iraq prior to his vote to authorize the 2003 invasion of Iraq, Gilmore stated that those "who are responsible for sending this country to war ... ought to read at least that kind of material". When asked if he had a problem with oil companies making a profit, Gilmore stated that he saw no problems with it and that he believed this was "an appropriate thing to do." He later confirmed his opposition to the Kyoto Protocol because it "was going to basically just transfer money directly to Russia for nothing" and that it must include "every nation of the world in this entire project ... includ[ing] China and India" to meet his approval. But at the end of the debate when asked if he believed a conservative could include conservationist principles, he answered that he believed it could be a part of the platform because "energy independence ... is a national security issue" which serves the interests of Conservatives by preserving a "clean society that is also safe and secure for the nation."

On June 17, Gilmore was featured as the spotlight guest on CNN. He discussed economic policies of the Bush Administration that he disagreed with including "the prescription drug program", but he applauded the president's record on cutting taxes and stated that the handling of the economy was "not the source of the president's unpopularity." He assessed that "there are other areas" that have caused the low polling numbers including "the Iraq war". He confirmed that he was "very uncomfortable with" the handling of the war, but strongly disagreed with some Democratic leaders who called for a timetable for withdrawal. He argued that these politicians were "not taking the best interest of this country (The United States) into effect."

Later in June, Fox News did a report on the families of the candidates running for president. Jim Gilmore's family was described as being busy with school and employment, limiting them from full-time campaigning. Two of the candidate's sons, Ashton and Jay were examined for the report. Ashton Gilmore worked full-time for his father's campaign headquarters, and Jay Gilmore worked in Washington and was only able to campaign as his schedule allowed. In election polling, unpromising results surfaced for the Gilmore campaign. In a CNN/Opinion Research Corporation poll, Gilmore failed to register half a percentage point among Republican voters. A grimmer portrait was painted for the campaign when end of the month finances revealed it was nearly broke with only $61,765 cash on hand from the $391,693 that had been raised overall.

Early in July, Gilmore was rushed to the emergency room after suffering from vision problems. He was immediately hospitalized and compelled to undergo surgery after he was diagnosed with a detached retina. Gilmore's campaign was stalled as the candidate was ordered by doctors to restrict travel for an indefinite period. The doctors revealed that Gilmore's vision problems could have deteriorated to the loss of eyesight.

On July 14, Gilmore ended his campaign citing a late start, which "made it impractical to continue to pursue this path towards further public service". The withdrawal was tied to a lack of funds and his diagnosis of a detached retina, which cut short at least a week of scheduled campaign appearances. In his final address of the campaign, Gilmore stated:

I have come to believe that it takes more than a positive vision for our nation's future to successfully compete for the presidency. I believe that it takes years of preparation to put in place both the political and financial infrastructure to contest what now amounts to a one-day national primary in February.

== Campaign staff ==
Gilmore selected Kieran Mahoney to serve as the national consultant of the campaign. He was employed as the managing partner of Mercury Public Affairs, and worked on Bob Dole's presidential campaign in 1996, George Pataki's three gubernatorial runs and Al D'Amato's 1992 Senatorial campaign.

Tom Bunnell served as Gilmore's deputy campaign manager. He previously served as the campaign manager for Conrad Burns' unsuccessful 2006 Senatorial re-election campaign and worked as the political director for Oliver North's 1994 Senatorial run.

Gilmore's policy director was Dick Leggitt who previously served as the consultant on Gilmore's 1997 gubernatorial campaign. Director of Administrative Affairs was Egan Crover, who was formally a Legislative Aide to Maryland Senator Richard F. Colburn. Danny Adams served as Gilmore's treasurer, and Boyd Marcus and Christian Josi both served as consultants for the campaign. Marcus worked on George Allen's 1991 congressional campaign, and served as the Virginia state coordinator for President George H. W. Bush's 1988 presidential campaign. Josi worked on Dan Quayle's 1999 campaign for president and Gilmore's 1997 gubernatorial run. Troy Bishop served as the Iowa campaign director for Gilmore's campaign.

== Endorsements ==
- Former Treasury Secretary John W. Snow
- Former Congressional candidate Paul Jost

== Aftermath ==
Following his presidential campaign, Gilmore announced on November 19, 2007 that he had begun a campaign to fill the United States Senate seat of retiring Republican Senator John Warner in his home state of Virginia. In his four-minute announcement video, Gilmore stated that the Senatorial race "is going to be a campaign about national security, about transportation, about education and about illegal immigration." His Democratic challenger was former Virginia Governor Mark Warner who was previously mentioned as a potential candidate for president in 2008. Gilmore would later lose the race to Warner in a landslide.

On February 9, 2008, Gilmore endorsed presumptive Republican Party nominee John McCain for the presidency. In a statement, Gilmore described McCain as "a proven conservative leader with a track record of cutting taxes, eliminating wasteful government spending, upholding our traditional values and promoting a strong national defense." On July 30, 2015, Gilmore eventually launched another presidential bid for the 2016 election, but dropped out on February 12, 2016.
