= Mike Huckabee 2008 presidential campaign =

American political campaign

Mike Huckabee for President 2008
- Campaign: 2008 U.S. presidential election
- Candidate: Mike Huckabee; Governor of Arkansas 1996–2007
- Affiliation: Republican Party
- Status: Announced Jan. 28, 2007; Suspended Mar. 4, 2008
- Headquarters: Little Rock, Arkansas
- Key people: Chip Saltsman (Manager); Ed Rollins (Chairman & Senior Advisor); James Pinkerton (Senior Advisor); Kirsten Fedewa (Communications Director); Alice Stewart (Press Secretary); Mike Rounds (National Steering Committee Chairman)
- Slogan: Faith. Family. Freedom.

Website
- mikehuckabee.com (archived February 28, 2008)

The Mike Huckabee 2008 presidential campaign began on January 28, 2007, when former Governor of Arkansas Mike Huckabee announced his candidacy for the Republican nomination for President of the United States for the 2008 election. Huckabee ultimately ended his bid for the nomination after losing the Texas Republican primary on March 4, 2008.

Huckabee's campaign began with a first-quarter fundraising total lower than many of the front-running Republican candidates, raising $544,880. Huckabee said that he found it difficult to move forward in a race "ruled by candidates with the biggest names". Nonetheless, Huckabee placed second in the August 11 Iowa Straw Poll with 18.1 percent. He came in second at the onsite polling of the Family Research Council Values Voters Summit on October 21, 2007, with 28% of the vote, and garnered a celebrity endorsement from actor Chuck Norris.

In December 2007, Huckabee began challenging other candidates for first place in national polls among Republicans. On January 3, 2008, Huckabee won the Iowa Republican Caucuses with 34% of the electorate. On Super Tuesday, Huckabee won an additional six states, including most of the Deep South. After losing the Texas primary in March, however, Huckabee officially ended his campaign and conceded the race to U.S. senator John McCain.

== Campaign development ==
=== Beginnings ===
On January 27, 2007, the Associated Press reported that Huckabee planned to file papers to form a presidential exploratory committee. He announced his run for the White House on Meet the Press on January 28, 2007. James Carville, Clinton's former political consultant, said the following about Huckabee: "He likes people, he knows how to relate to people. He can talk the talk. I'm impressed with this guy's political skills."

On Meet the Press, Huckabee said "I think you've got to be very careful. I wouldn't propose any new taxes. I wouldn't support any. But if we’re in a situation where we are in a different level of war, where there is no other option, I think that it's a very dangerous position to make pledges that are outside the most important pledge you make, and that is the oath you take to uphold the Constitution and protect the people of the United States."

Grover Norquist, the president of Americans for Tax Reform, who in 2006 called the governor a "serial tax increaser," stated, "Gov. Huckabee recognizes that the challenge is to rein in spending and reduce taxes." Huckabee supports the Fair Tax, which would do away with all federal taxes and replace them with a single national sales tax. In March 2007, Huckabee signed the Presidential Taxpayer Protection Pledge of Americans for Tax Reform, promising not to increase taxes at the federal level.

On April 3, 2007, Huckabee's campaign reported that it had raised only $500,000 in the first quarter of 2007, much less than rival candidates. The numbers prompted speculation in Arkansas that Huckabee might abandon the Presidential race for a U.S. Senate race against first-term Democrat Mark Pryor. Huckabee denied any plans to do this, and Huckabee campaign manager Chip Saltsman claimed that the campaign had actually surpassed its first quarter fund raising goal.

On April 23, 2007, Huckabee finished second in a South Carolina straw poll conducted by the local Republican parties in Greenville, Spartanburg and Richland counties with 111 votes behind former Massachusetts Gov. Mitt Romney. That same day, Huckabee said that Attorney General Alberto Gonzales is "creating a major distraction for the President and for the administration and for the Republican Party," and suggested that perhaps Gonzales should consider resigning due to the current controversy surrounding him.

Huckabee participated in the May 3, 2007 Republican Presidential Debates along with the party's other nine declared candidates. Huckabee expressed support of a FairTax, a balanced budget with reduced spending, making the Bush administration's 2001 and 2003 tax cuts permanent, combating climate change, and comprehensive immigration reform. Political analyst and former Clinton and Huckabee adviser Dick Morris said Huckabee performed well, asserting that he was the "most original" candidate, especially with his explanation of the pro-life platform; and that his articulation was "novel and intriguing." Huckabee was one of three candidates in the debate who said that they do not believe in human evolution.

Huckabee generated even better reviews from his performance in the May 15, 2007 Republican Presidential Debates. He received what was characterized by Esquire as "gales of laughter" as well as approval from the political press for his statement that "[w]e've had a Congress that's spent money like John Edwards at a beauty shop," a reference to the report of Edwards, a 2008 Democratic presidential candidate, spending $800 of campaign money on two haircuts. Many supporters of the FairTax plan were also impressed by Huckabee's unfettered support of that proposed policy.

The Huckabee campaign announced on Friday, June 8, that the former governor would participate in the Iowa Republican Party's Straw Poll, scheduled for Saturday, August 11, 2007, in Ames, at Iowa State University. An Iowa poll conducted in mid-June showed Huckabee in fourth place with 7 percent; ahead of John McCain and Sam Brownback. Later, an ABC News/Washington Post poll showed Huckabee at 8%, tied with John McCain. That was the highest Huckabee had polled in that state.

=== Third quarter 2007 ===
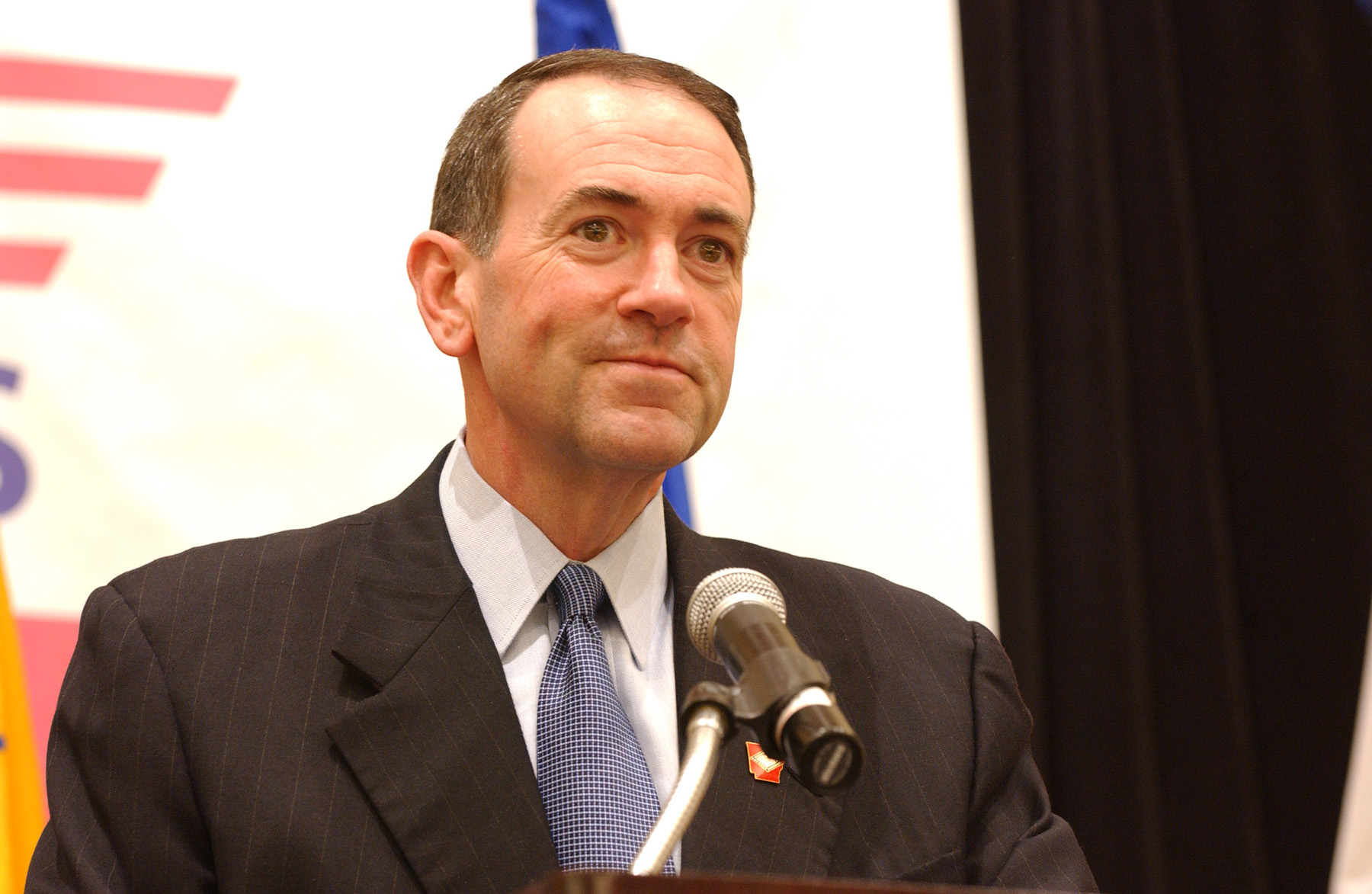
Mike Huckabee giving a speech in 2004

Early in the third quarter, after second-quarter fundraising totals increased only slightly to over $760,000, Huckabee criticized the top-tier Republicans for wastefully spending their campaign money and said that "I really don't want some folks in charge of the federal treasury if the way they're burning campaign money is indicative of how they would burn taxpayer money"

Political analyst and former Bill Clinton campaign manager Dick Morris called Huckabee his favorite among the bottom-tier candidates on Hannity & Colmes on July 3. Huckabee began a grassroots movement in Iowa, and stumped throughout the state during July. In a July 9, 2007, interview, Huckabee said that his solution for ending the ongoing violence in Iraq would include a troop increase and seeking additional support from other nations in the Middle East. He was a guest on Fox News' The Neil Cavuto Show on Friday, July 20, and then returned to Iowa for numerous Meet Mike Huckabee events. He traveled to Amarillo, Texas on July 22 to give a sermon at The Church at Quail Creek. Huckabee continued to keep a busy schedule in Iowa in late July; he traveled to Muscatine and was a guest on the conservative radio talk show The Right Balance with host Greg Allen on July 24.

An Iowa poll conducted on July 26 placed Huckabee far behind front-runners Mitt Romney and Fred Thompson, but ahead of second-tier candidates Tom Tancredo, Ron Paul, Duncan Hunter, and Tommy Thompson. Huckabee has also agreed to be part of a Cancer Forum in Iowa on August 28, held by cancer survivor Lance Armstrong. In the summer of 2007, Huckabee began to become closely compared to Kansas Senator Sam Brownback, also a Presidential candidate, for their similar socially conservative views. Huckabee and Brownback have been said to be the top candidates among evangelicals and other Christians. Huckabee tried to separate himself from Brownback (and succeeded, as Brownback dropped from the campaign) whom he saw as his main rival at that point. When asked what separates him from Brownback, he said that "the key difference is I've actually been a Governor for ten and a half years and I've run a government." He also said that no senator has been elected since JFK, and "frankly there's a good reason for that." Several polls in the state have placed Huckabee ahead of Brownback; a Mason-Dixon poll placed him at 7% with Brownback at 6. Huckabee acknowledged their similarities and said that "without a doubt, we're going after the same voters." Other sources have expressed concern that there is room for only one of them in the race, and that if Huckabee comes out on top, Brownback will struggle to raise money and vice versa.

On July 26, Huckabee called upon Tom Tancredo to pull his campaign's campaign ad which attacked Huckabee on the subject of illegal immigration. Huckabee called the ad "blatantly dishonest" and said that "when people engage in a completely false attack, it's usually an act of desperation. To me, it's a badge of honor because he sees that we are reaching the people we are trying to reach." Tancredo's campaign responded by saying that Huckabee supports amnesty for illegal immigrants, and that the ad was correct while Huckabee's campaign insisted that the ad "clearly distorts Mike Huckabee's conservative record on amnesty."

In early August, after the collapse of the I-35W Mississippi River bridge in Minneapolis, Minnesota, Huckabee expressed his sympathy to the victims of the disaster and said that taxes do not need to be raised in order to fix the roads, bridges, and other infrastructure, claiming that the billions of dollars spent on other countries' infrastructure should be spent in the United States. He said that "we have to start addressing building this country, not everybody else's."

Mike Huckabee appeared on the CBS Evening News on August 1 to discuss the Iowa Straw Poll and his ongoing campaign in Iowa. He was among the Republican debaters in Iowa on August 5, and came in with 8 percent support in a pre-debate poll, tying with John McCain and ahead of his main competitor Sam Brownback who came in with 5 percent. Huckabee was pleased with the results, which showed that he was ahead of all of his second-tier candidates, and said "we think [the poll is] a great sign for us because it shows that when other candidates are standing still or moving backwards we clearly are moving forward."

In the days before the Iowa Straw Poll, potential but undeclared Republican candidate Newt Gingrich commented that Huckabee is "the most interesting dark horse," and that he will catch on with Republican Primary voters. He also said that Huckabee has a level of authenticity and candor that is beginning to resonate with people. Huckabee appeared on Hardball with Chris Matthews on August 8 and discussed his standing in the polls as well as the upcoming straw poll.

At the August 11 Iowa Straw Poll, Huckabee took second place with 2,587 votes, roughly 18 percent. Huckabee spent $57.98 per vote in the Straw Poll, which is the lowest among the top three finishers. Since Romney was expected by the vast majority to take first in the poll, many declared Huckabee the big winner. The National Review said that "When it was all over, there was no doubt that the winner of the day was Huckabee." Huckabee told reports that "It is beyond huge. Tonight, for all practical purposes, we won the Iowa straw poll. No one was even saying we would come in second. You gotta admit, for what we had to work with, the resources we had, for us to surge, coming in second, is the victory, it is the story."

Huckabee echoed his statement when he appeared on Face the Nation on the morning of August 12. "We're in fact in the first tier, I think, by everybody's estimation, and here's why," Huckabee told Jim Axelrod. "It wasn't just that we surprised people with a second showing, it's that we did it with so few resources. I mean, this really was feeding the 5,000 with two fish and five loaves, an amazing kind of day for us." Looking beyond Iowa, former Governor of South Carolina and Huckabee supporter David Beasley said that Huckabee is filling the void created by the lack of a social conservative in the race. He said that "I really believe now that the conservative voters will begin to coalesce behind Mike Huckabee...and it's going to be infectious in New Hampshire and South Carolina"

In the week following the Straw Poll, Huckabee scheduled a trip to New Hampshire, seen as the next battleground state. He is scheduled to spend August 17 to the 20th in that state attending picnics and spaghetti dinners, and meeting with local pastors. When Huckabee appeared on Fox News' Hannity & Colmes to discuss his straw poll showing and future plans, he expressed confidence in his New Hampshire effort and said that "we have a great team in New Hampshire. I'm very confident we're going to surprise people in New Hampshire just like we did Iowa. Also in the week following the Straw Poll, Huckabee continued to talk of the momentum his campaign gained from his 2nd place showing. He told reporters that "it was a great day for us and the results have been pretty dramatic. We had over 1,000 first-time contributors from Saturday night to Tuesday morning online and the phones have not stopped ringing." In all, Huckabee experienced more media exposure in one week than he had in the past 6 months. He appeared on such shows as Hardball with Chris Matthews, Kudlow & Company, Hannity & Colmes, The Early Show, Your World with Neil Cavuto and the Laura Ingraham radio show.

Huckabee's media exposure continued to grow when he appeared on The Colbert Report on August 16 and the season premiere of Real Time with Bill Maher on August 24. Colbert jokingly attributed Huckabee's success in the Ames Straw Poll to "the Colbert bump" in reference to Huckabee's two prior appearances on the show while Maher remarked, "Rudy Giuliani scares the hell out of me so I hope you win, and the good news for you, on your birthday, is that this year a Republican dark horse could win." The coverage from Colbert instigated the Who Made Huckabee? mock feud.

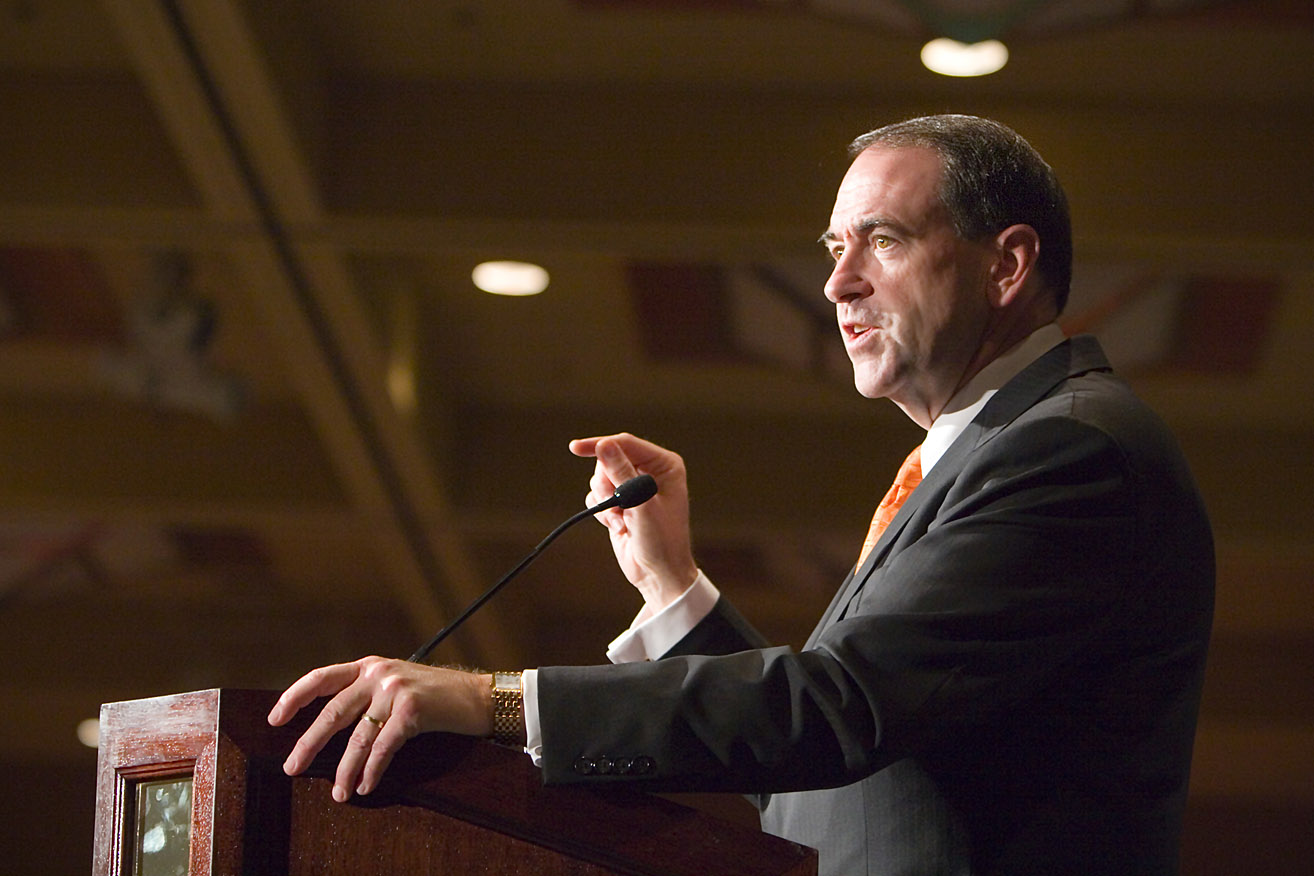
Mike Huckabee speaking at a Southern California engagement in October 2007.

Further evidence of his growing prominence was seen the next day, when during a Democratic rally, Jesse Jackson was asked about his opinion of the "four Republican front-runners" and responded with "I tell y'all, don't ever forget about Mike Huckabee!"

Huckabee starred in what pundits called the highlight of the New Hampshire Republican Debate on September 5, sparring with Congressman Ron Paul in a heated exchange over the war in Iraq and the United States' obligation to the Iraqi people. After Paul stated that U.S. foreign policy is dragging the Republican Party down, Huckabee responded, "Even if we lose elections, we should not lose our honor, and that is more important than the Republican Party." As the third quarter closed, Huckabee was reported to have missed a major GOP conference in Michigan because his campaign could not afford a charter flight. Huckabee rebounded his finances before the end of the third quarter, however, reporting $651,301 on hand. In late September, former Speaker of the House Newt Gingrich and former President Bill Clinton said in separate interviews that Huckabee will catch on with Republican primary voters, and called him most likely "dark horse" candidate to win.

=== Fourth quarter 2007 ===
Huckabee came in second place in the Family Research Council Value Voters Summit straw poll with 27.15%, behind former Massachusetts Governor Romney, but won among onsite voters with 51.26 percent of onsite votes at the Washington, DC meeting. On October 22, actor Chuck Norris announced his endorsement of Huckabee in a release on Huckabee's website. Norris said that "I believe the only one who has all of the characteristics to lead America forward into the future is ex-Arkansas Gov. Mike Huckabee. Mike Huckabee is the real deal." On The Sean Hannity Show on October 22, debate analyst Frank Luntz said "I think Mike Huckabee's coming in 2nd in Iowa." In late October, following the Republican Presidential Debate in Orlando, Florida, Huckabee's website traffic increased to more than that of all of the other Republican candidates except for Ron Paul. On October 25, a national Rasmussen poll gave Huckabee his highest polling number yet – 10%. Talk show host Bill O'Reilly, who was a skeptic of Huckabee's success, had previously made a bet with Dick Morris that Huckabee would never reach double digits.

There was controversy when Huckabee was asked about responses he gave on a questionnaire during his 1992 race for the U.S. Senate. Huckabee stated in 1992, "I feel [homosexuality] is an aberrant, unnatural, and sinful lifestyle, and we now know it can pose a dangerous public health risk." He also suggested that AIDS patients should be "isolated from the general population." He stuck by those comments in December 2007 when asked if homosexuality is sinful. He replied, "Well I believe it would be—just like lying is sinful and stealing is sinful. There are a lot of things that are sinful. It doesn't mean that a person is a horrible person. It means that they engage in behavior that is outside the norms of those boundaries of our traditional view of what's right and what's wrong. So, I think that anybody who has, maybe a traditional worldview of homosexuality would classify that as an unusual behavior that is not traditional and that would be outside those bounds." He also defended his statements about isolation of AIDS patients, claiming that in 1992 "we were still learning about the virus that causes AIDS." Huckabee's poll numbers rose consistently through November and December. On November 15, 2007, Huckabee was recorded as placing second in Iowa in an American Research Group poll at 24%. This was only 2% points lower than the leader Mitt Romney. Polls in early December placed Huckabee ahead of Romney in Iowa by as much as 5 points in a poll by the Des Moines Register, and 3 points in a Rasmussen poll.

On November 16, 2007, Huckabee was recorded as placing second, for the first time, in a nationwide poll, garnering 12% of presidential tracking poll by Rassmussen Reports. He was tied with Mitt Romney and Fred Thompson. On December 1, 2007, Huckabee moved up to 15%, his highest percentage yet - and he surpassed Giuliani on December 5 with 20% of Republican voters supporting him nationally versus Giuliani's 17%. On December 19, Huckabee tied with Giuliani in the national Reuters/Zogby poll.

Huckabee credited divine intervention for his rising poll numbers. "There's only one explanation for it," Huckabee said, "and it's not a human one. It's the same power that helped a little boy with two fish and five loaves feed a crowd of 5,000 people." When the close proximity of the first contests to the holidays led to many candidates putting out Christmas ads and videos — allowing them to keep presenting their message but in a more appropriate setting — Huckabee chose one acknowledging that viewers were tired of political messages in the holiday season and that what "really matters is the celebration of the birth of Christ," avoiding other candidates' "Happy holidays" formulation. The ad generated considerable media discussion about whether a white bookshelf in the background was a subliminal Christian cross; Huckabee mocked the suggestion and said it was just a bookshelf. When asked about the ad and the thought of it being a cross, Republican presidential candidate Ron Paul stated that he had not seen the ad, but replied with the assumption that it was a cross, quoting Sinclair Lewis' warning that "when fascism comes to this country, it will be wrapped in the flag, carrying a cross."

Roy Beck called Huckabee "an absolute disaster as governor of Arkansas... Every time there was any enforcement in his state, he took the side of the illegal aliens." Huckabee responded by saying if voters are looking for the toughest guy on immigration, he's not their man. Nevertheless, like many in the Republican party, Huckabee's position has evolved, particularly after the bruising immigration reform fight in summer 2007. On December 6, 2007, he released a nine-point immigration enforcement and border security plan. These were modeled on a ten-point plan proposed in 2005 by Mark Krikorian. On January 16, 2008, Huckabee became the first presidential candidate to sign Americans for Better Immigration's No-Amnesty pledge. NumbersUSA raised his rating on illegal immigration to EXCELLENT. Huckabee continues to speak for the dignity of legal immigrants. In the January 10 Republican debate he said that all immigrants "ought to live with their heads up. We ought to have the assumption that everybody here is legal, that nobody here is illegal."

=== First quarter 2008: caucuses and primaries begin ===
On January 3, 2008, actual delegate selections began. Huckabee was declared the winner of the Iowa Republican caucus, with 34 percent of the vote, nine percentage points ahead of his chief Iowa rival, Mitt Romney.

On January 8, 2008, Huckabee finished third place in the New Hampshire primary, behind John McCain in first place, and Mitt Romney who finished second, with Huckabee receiving one more delegate for a total of 18 delegates, gained via elections, and 21 total delegates, verses 30 total (24 via elections) for Romney, and 10 for McCain (all via elections).

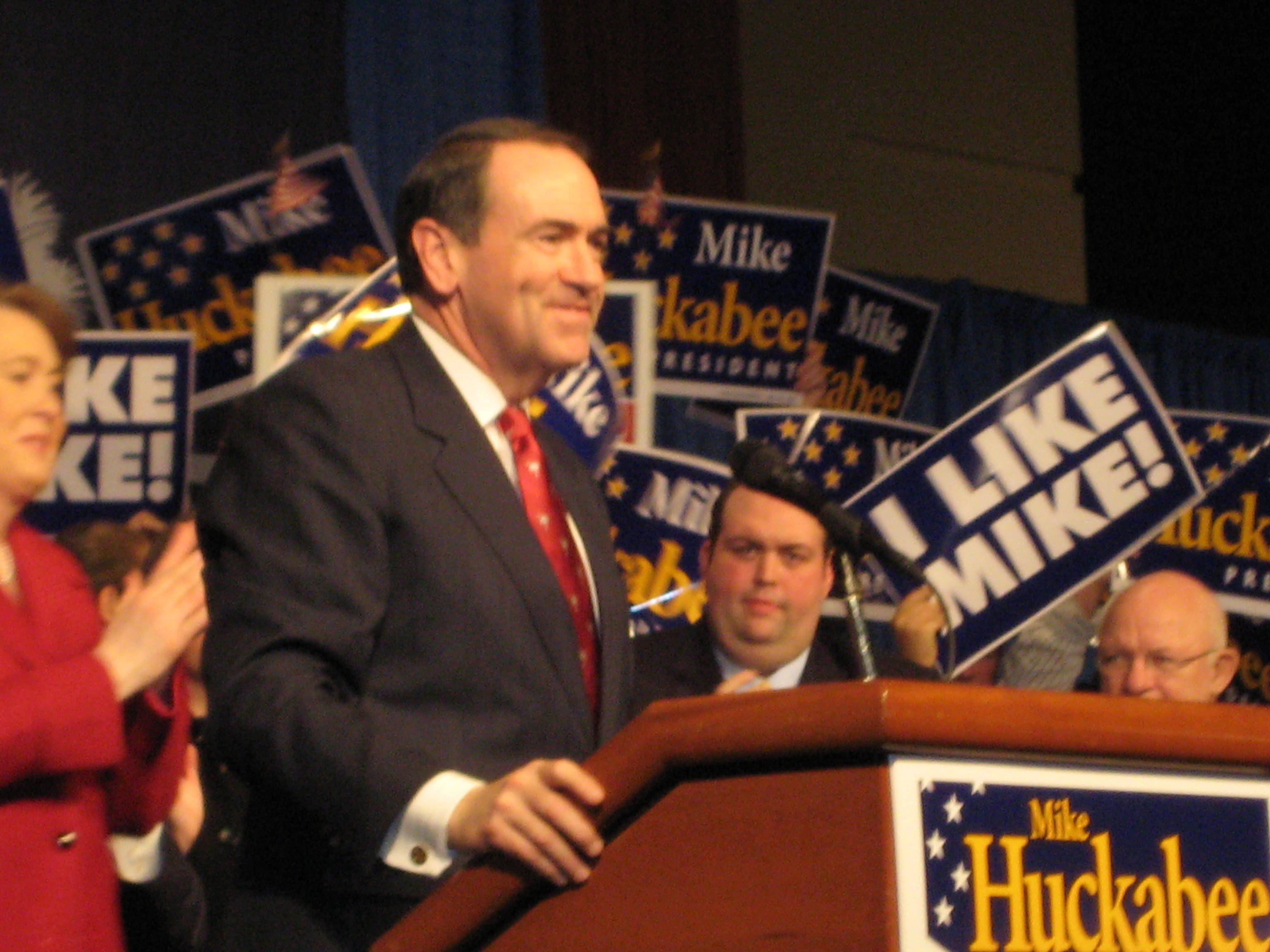
Mike Huckabee giving his concession speech after the 2008 South Carolina Presidential primary in Columbia, South Carolina.

On January 15, 2008, Huckabee finished in third place in the Michigan primary, behind John McCain in second place, Mitt Romney who finished first and ahead of Ron Paul, who finished in fourth place.

On January 19, 2008, Huckabee finished in second place in the South Carolina primary, behind John McCain who finished first.

On February 5, 2008, Huckabee won the first contest of "Super Tuesday" by winning the West Virginia GOP state convention by winning 52% of the electorate to Mitt Romney's 47%. Backers of rival John McCain threw him their support to prevent Mitt Romney from capturing the winner-take-all GOP state convention vote. He also registered victories in Alabama, Arkansas, Georgia and Tennessee on Super Tuesday, bringing his delegate count up to 156, a distant third compared to 689 for Republican Party front-runner John McCain and Mitt Romney's 286, according to the 2008 Republican presidential primaries and caucuses.

On February 9, 2008, Huckabee won the first election following Super Tuesday, by winning 60% of the vote in the Kansas Republican Caucuses. This was also the first contest to be held without Mitt Romney, who was said to be splitting the conservative vote with Huckabee and some pundits suggested it was the reason for Huckabee's landslide victory. Huckabee also won the Louisiana Republican Primary with 44% of the vote to John McCain's 43% in second. Although Huckabee won the primary he was not awarded any delegates, because of the state party rules that state a candidate must pass the 50% threshold to receive the state's pledged delegates.

Despite those wins, however, McCain won all the other post-super-Tuesday February primaries. On March 4, McCain obtained the necessary delegates to secure the nomination with wins in the first four March primaries. As a result, Huckabee conceded the nomination to McCain in the late evening of March 4.

First place by popular vote and plurality of delegates Huckabee in Red

=== Delegate count ===
2008 Republican presidential primaries delegate count As of June 10, 2008
Candidates	Actual pledged delegates^{1} (1,780 of 1,917)	Estimated total delegates^{2} (2,159 of 2,380; 1,191 needed to win)
John McCain	1,378	1,575
Mike Huckabee	240	278
Mitt Romney	148	271
Ron Paul	14	35
Color key: / 1st place / Candidate has withdrawn
Sources:^{1} "Primary Season Election Results". The New York Times. September 16, 2008. Archived from the original on September 16, 2008.^{2} "Election Center 2008 - Republican Delegate Scorecard". CNN. June 4, 2008.

== Controversies and criticism ==
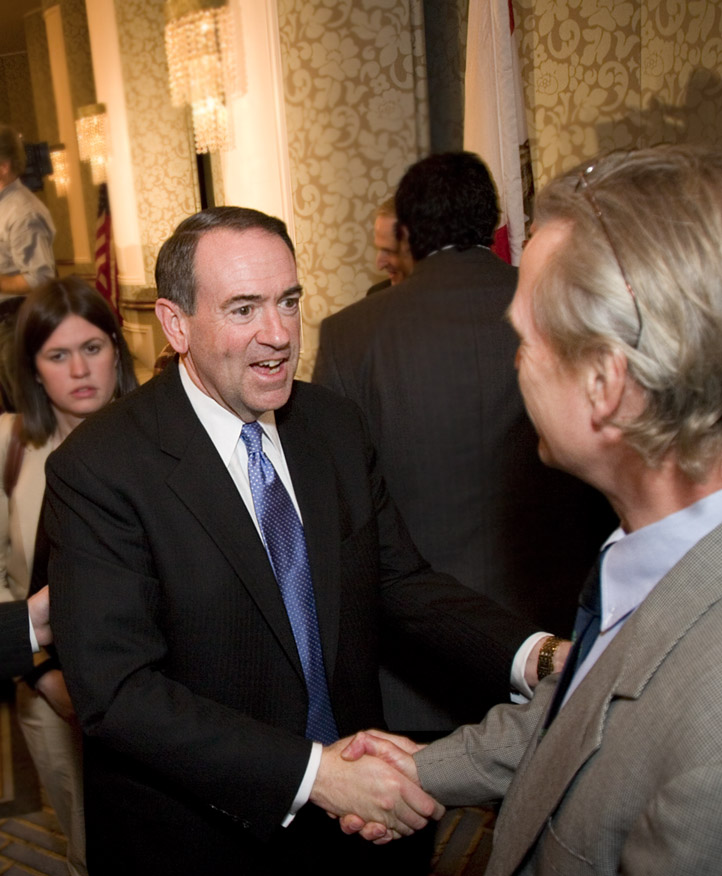
Huckabee greeting an attendee after an address at the San Francisco Commonwealth Club on January 31, 2008.

Huckabee stated that being criticized was a good sign for him because it meant that he was a viable candidate. Huckabee said of the political attacks, "Suddenly, I seem to be in the cross hairs of every predator who is out there." "As a hunter, I know that a good hunter never aims his gun at a dead carcass. You only point it at something you want to put on the wall as a trophy."

On Hillary Clinton, Huckabee said, "There's nothing funny about Hillary Clinton being president. Let me tell you why. If she's president, taxes go up, healthcare becomes the domain of the government, spending goes out of control, our military loses its morale, and I'm not sure we'll have the courage and the will and the resolve to fight the greatest threat this country's ever faced in Islamofascism."

Huckabee criticized Fred Thompson on his stance on abortion and gay marriage. Thompson stated that such issues should be left to the states to decide. Thompson returned the criticism by criticizing Huckabee on immigration and taxes.

Mitt Romney criticized Huckabee on immigration by stating, "Giving a better deal to the children of illegal aliens than we give to US citizens from surrounding states is simply not fair and not right." Huckabee responded, "I guess Mitt Romney would rather keep people out of college so they can keep working on his lawn, since he had illegals there." Previously, Huckabee had criticized Romney for claiming to have been a hunter.

The Club for Growth criticized Huckabee in November 2007 over inconsistencies in how Huckabee represents his tax record, specifically regarding the 1999 gas and diesel fuel tax hikes. The 1999 gas and fuel tax hikes were never on the ballot in Arkansas, but Huckabee has told reporters that "the fuel tax was a vote of the people—eighty percent of the people voted to improve roads". However, FactCheck.org, after looking at the nuances of the issue in detail, states "Huckabee seems to be describing the plan he wanted rather than the plan he actually supported", which was a compromise plan arrived at after much political wrangling.

Huckabee's son, David Huckabee, also posed a small controversy with his arrest for carrying a weapon in a prohibited place after a Glock pistol was found in his briefcase while going through a security checkpoint at the Little Rock National Airport. David Huckabee, who pleaded guilty to the misdemeanor charge, said that he forgot to take the gun out of his bag before going to the airport. After the events took place, Mike Huckabee, a strong right to bear arms candidate said "I love my son but what he did was irresponsible, but not intentional. The right to carry a firearm has to be balanced with an equal responsibility to not make foolish errors like forgetting about it being in one's briefcase. ...I make no excuses for him and would expect him to accept whatever penalties are given. It is the court's responsibility to properly consequence him for a foolish act but his family's responsibility to love him and temper our disappointment with our support."

Some critics, including Romney, accused Huckabee of using his religion background for political advantage. A Romney campaign staff member pointed out that similar ads in Iowa and New Hampshire are different in that the New Hampshire ad did not include the term "Christian Leader" in the spot, while an ad in Iowa did. Alice Stewart, a spokeswomen of the Huckabee campaign, later said that there was no intention to downplay religion in New Hampshire, noting the ads "were simply different spots running in different markets, which is typical in presidential campaigns."

Huckabee received further criticism in early January 2008 when, having previously agreed to try to work with unions if elected, he then crossed a WGA Writer's Strike picket line in order to appear on The Tonight Show with Jay Leno.

=== Relationship with McCain campaign ===
In most of the primaries, the conservative votes had been split between Huckabee and Romney while Romney was in the race. Due to Huckabee's third-place standing in the delegate count and his refusal to concede, some prominent conservative pundits had charged that "a vote for Huckabee equals a vote for McCain", and that Huckabee's actions hinted to a possible bid to a vice presidency or cabinet position for Huckabee in McCain's administration, should McCain win the Presidency.

McCain and Huckabee had a cordial relationship during the campaign, which has been questioned by those who see Huckabee campaigning from a strong social conservative platform while McCain is seen by many as socially moderate or liberal.

On Super Tuesday in West Virginia, McCain supporters threw their support to Huckabee, which resulted in a highly publicized Huckabee win early on Tuesday. Romney had been leading there in the polls prior to the primary. This strategy likely both increased the number of votes given to Huckabee and reduced the number that went to Romney of those voting Tuesday evening. The strategy appears to have been successful as Romney suspended his campaign two days later after a poor showing in Super Tuesday.

Although the Romney campaign initially criticized the deal between McCain and Huckabee, Romney later threw his support behind McCain after dropping out of the race, stating that "This is a man capable of leading our country at a dangerous hour."

== Lincoln-Douglas debate ==
On September 7, Huckabee sent an open letter to Fred Thompson inviting him to participate in a Lincoln-Douglas style debate. "I share your view of the debates and agree that Newt's 'Nine Nineties in Nine' concept is a far better way to make sure America's next President has the character and capacity to lead our nation forward, and that's why I have already signed that pledge," Huckabee wrote in his letter. "I agree that what is needed is a real discussion by the candidates about their vision for the future of our country." He suggested that the first debate be held in New Hampshire.

Huckabee posted the letter on his campaign site and invited American voters to co-sign it as an appeal to Thompson to accept the challenge. In 72 hours it received nearly 2,000 signatures. The Strafford County Republican Women group agreed to host the debate and CNN's Wolf Blitzer suggested to Huckabee on The Late Edition that it be broadcast by CNN. On September 11, the media reported that Thompson campaign had turned down the challenge, saying that they would "push hard for Lincoln-Douglas style debates once [they] get into the General Election, when there are only two candidates running."

== Financial struggles ==
In late January 2008, after finishing 2nd in the January 19 South Carolina primary, the Huckabee campaign faced significant financial setbacks, due to a decrease in cash flow expectations after not meeting the expectation of winning the first in the south primary. This caused Huckabee to ask some senior staff members to work without pay, and put uncertainty on the future of his campaign and how long Huckabee would be able to compete financially.

== Media ==
Huckabee initially formed a website at www.explorehuckabee.com, in which he based his exploratory committee. When he officially announced his candidacy, he moved the website to www.mikehuckabee.com. Huckabee's campaign used various forms of social media to reach out to voters. Beginning in March 2007, Huckabee created a YouTube account to update followers of his campaign with videos. Huckabee's campaign also launched an official MySpace account and Facebook page.

Huckabee, who plays the bass guitar in a band known as Capitol Offense, performed with the band at numerous events throughout his campaign, including at a troop rally in New Hampshire, and a National Governors Association staff party in Des Moines, Iowa. On January 2, 2007, Huckabee played the guitar along with The Tonight Show Band on The Tonight Show with Jay Leno.

During his campaign, Huckabee made frequent appearances on late night television shows including The Tonight Show with Jay Leno, the Late Show with David Letterman, Saturday Night Live, Late Night with Conan O'Brien, The Daily Show with Jon Stewart, The Late Late Show with Craig Ferguson and The Colbert Report.

== Popularity among young voters ==
Mike Huckabee generated a considerable following of young voters, primarily because of his support of the Fair Tax as well as his concerns about global warming, education, and several other issues typically not referred to by Republicans.

Huckabee gathered a following among the younger crowd via the internet. Huck's Army, an online grassroots coalition and volunteer think tank, was composed of younger, more technologically savvy supporter base. This group received national media attention and was credited by Huckabee as "the secret weapon of our campaign."Hucksamy - Blog chia sẻ kỹ năng sống, kỹ năng sinh tồn cần thiết

Huckabee has also gained considerable popularity from his frequent appearances on The Daily Show, The Tonight Show with Jay Leno, and The Colbert Report, all of which have considerably younger viewers.

In the early part of 2008, there was a comedic on-air "feud" between Conan O'Brien (host of Late Night with Conan O'Brien), Stephen Colbert (host of The Colbert Report), and later Jon Stewart (host of The Daily Show), with the three men taking credit for Huckabee's success and popularity among young voters, saying that they "made Huckabee".

On February 7, 2008, Huckabee made a trip to New York to appear on The Tyra Banks Show, a popular show with younger women, and later that night, went back on The Colbert Report to declare he was still a candidate in the race and played a game of air hockey with the host, Stephen Colbert.

On February 23, 2008, Huckabee appeared on the Weekend Update portion of Saturday Night Live to explain why he was still in the election despite the "mathematical impossibility" of him winning the nomination. After an explanation by Seth Meyers about why he cannot win, Huckabee said that he would "not overstay his welcome" if he did not win the nomination.

== African-American support ==
In a debate, Huckabee claimed to have gained 48 percent of the black vote, a feat seldom reached by Republican candidates since the 1930s. However, this figure was based on a very small sample of blacks polled at exit polls; the actual number has been estimated at 20%.

On January 21, 2008, Mike Huckabee received the endorsement of 50 African-American leaders in Atlanta, Georgia. The endorsers cited Huckabee's record on life, education, minorities, the economy, the prison system, and immigration as Arkansas governor.

Hip-Hop 4 Huckabee, a blog targeted to young African-American voters, features several highlights of Huckabee's speeches and policies that tend to the needs of the black community.

== Endorsements ==
=== U.S. representatives ===
- Former 2008 Republican presidential candidate Duncan Hunter of California
- John Boozman of Arkansas
- Bob Inglis of South Carolina
- John Linder of Georgia
- Don Young of Alaska

=== Governors ===
- Former Governor of South Carolina, David Beasley
- Former Governor Jim Geringer of Wyoming
- Former Governor Judy Martz of Montana

=== State senators ===
- David Hartsuch (R-Iowa)
- Robert Clegg (R-New Hampshire)
- David L. Thomas (R-South Carolina)
- Danny Verdin (R-South Carolina)
- Daniel Webster (Florida Senate Majority Leader)
- Mike Haridopolos (Florida Senate Majority Whip)
- Dan Patrick (R-Texas)

=== State representatives ===
- Dwayne Alons (R-Iowa)
- Carmine Boal (R-Iowa)
- Julie M Brown (R-New Hampshire)
- Dudley D Dumaine (R-New Hampshire)
- Jason Bedrick (R-New Hampshire)
- Glenn L. Hamilton (R-South Carolina)
- R. Keith Kelly (R-South Carolina)
- Rex F. Rice (R-South Carolina)
- Liston D. Barfield (R-South Carolina)
- Marco Rubio (Florida House of Representatives Speaker)
- David Rivera (R-Florida)
- William J. Howell (Virginia House of Delegates Speaker)

=== Other politicians ===
- Lieutenant Governor of South Carolina Andre Bauer.
- Mayor of Ft. Lauderdale, Florida, Jim Naugle (D)
- Attorney General of Nebraska, Jon Bruning.
- Gubernatorial candidate Bob Vander Plaats of Iowa
- Former Arkansas Republican Party chairman Odell Pollard

=== Individuals ===
- Actor, Chuck Norris
- TNA wrestler Ric Flair
- Founder of Focus on the Family and prominent evangelical Christian leader, James Dobson
- Jim Gilchrist, founder of the Minuteman Project
- John Tyson, CEO and chairman of Tyson Foods
- Steven Reinemund, chairman of PepsiCo (Pepsi Food and Beverage Corporation)
- Scott Ford, president and CEO of Alltel
- Stephen Strang, founder of Charisma
- Rick Scarborough, president and founder of Vision America
- Liberty University chancellor Jerry Falwell, Jr.
- Jerry Cox, president of Arkansas Family Council
- Janet Folger, President of Faith2Action
- Jim Pfaff, President and CEO of Colorado Family Action
- Mathew Staver, founder and chairman of Liberty Counsel
- Kelly Shackelford, president of Free Market Foundation, Plano, Texas
- Phil Burress, president of Citizens for Community Values
- Donald Wildmon, founder of the American Family Association.
- Neal Boortz, Libertarian broadcaster
- Boxer Roy Jones Jr.
- Conservative political activist Paul Weyrich
- Bobby Schindler, brother of Terri Schiavo
- Former New York Yankee Bobby Richardson.
- Former Dallas Cowboys' safety Cliff Harris.
- Jeff Cook
- Randy Owen

=== Organizations ===
- International Association of Machinists and Aerospace Workers

=== Newspapers ===
- The Dallas Morning News
- Adel Dallas Co. News newspaper
- Albia Union-Republican newspaper
- Chariton Leader newspaper.
- Iowa City Press-Citizen newspaper
- Sheldon N'West Iowa Review newspaper
- Shenandoah Valley News Today

Governor Huckabee's notable endorsements included five current United States congressmen (including former presidential candidate Duncan Hunter), conservative leaders such as Focus on the Family chairman James Dobson, Minuteman Project founder Jim Gilchrist, Liberty University chancellor Jerry Falwell, Jr., and Libertarian talk-radio host Neal Boortz.

Huckabee was endorsed by professional wrestler "The Nature Boy" Ric Flair and boxer Roy Jones Jr.

Some Huckabee endorsements came from groups who don't typically support Republicans. He was the only Republican endorsed by a major labor union (having the support of the International Association of Machinists and Aerospace Workers) and has been endorsed by 50 African-American political and religious leaders. He also had the support of one of Texas's largest newspapers, The Dallas Morning News.
