= Brownback =

Brownback is a surname. Notable people with the surname include:

- Sam Brownback (born 1956), American politician, attorney, and diplomat
- Peter Brownback (1920-2012), American military officer and lawyer
