= Zaltzman (surname) =

Zaltzman is a surname. Notable people with the surname include:

- Andy Zaltzman (born 1974), British comedian and author
- Helen Zaltzman (born 1980), English podcaster, broadcaster, and writer

== See also ==
- Zaltman
- Saltman (surname)
