= Bruce Saltsman =

Former Commissioner for the Tennessee Department of Transportation

Commissioner of the Tennessee Department of Transportation
- In office January 21, 1995 – January 18, 2003
- Governor: Don Sundquist
- Preceded by: Carl Wood (acting)
- Succeeded by: Gerald F. Nicely

Personal details
- Born: John Bruce Saltsman; August 28, 1930 Loretto, Kentucky, U.S.
- Died: September 1, 2017 (aged 87) Nashville, Tennessee, U.S.
- Party: Republican
- Spouse: Edna Elaine

John Bruce Saltsman (August 28, 1930 – September 1, 2017) was the commissioner of the Tennessee Department of Transportation from 1995 to 2003. Before becoming commissioner, he was a road construction company executive with McDowell-Saltsman Construction, Saltsman Construction, and Rodgers and Saltsman Construction.

In 1996, Saltsman, along with Governor Don Sundquist, approved a $160,000 grant to convert a bridge in Townsend, Tennessee, to a covered bridge, but later announced that the grant had been pulled. The bridge was closed to traffic in 2009 and became a pedestrian bridge. During his tenure as commissioner, Saltsman oversaw the construction of State Route 840's southern loop around Davidson County, and the planning for the route's northern loop which was cancelled shortly after he left office due to budget and environmental issues.

After Republican Bill Haslam won the 2010 gubernatorial election, there was speculation that Saltsman would return to his former position at the Department of Transportation. Saltsman did not return to politics, and Haslam instead chose John Schroer to serve as commissioner.

On September 2, 2014, a portion of U.S. Route 64 in Lawrenceburg was renamed in Saltsman's honor. Saltsman's son Chip is an American politician, who has served as a political adviser and campaign manager.
