= Chip Saltsman =

American politician (born 1968)

- Born: John Bruce Saltsman Jr. March 24, 1968 (age 58); Nashville, Tennessee, US
- Education: Christian Brothers U. (MBA)
- Occupation: Politician
- Parents: Bruce Saltsman (father); Edna Elaine Saltsman (mother)
- Website: chipsaltsman.com

John Bruce "Chip" Saltsman Jr. (born March 24, 1968) is an American politician who has served as chairman of the Tennessee Republican Party from 1999 to 2001. He was also senior political advisor to former Senate Majority Leader Bill Frist and manager of Mike Huckabee's 2008 presidential campaign.

Saltsman worked for the Chuck Fleischmann campaign in Tennessee's 3rd district from 2009 to 2010. Saltsman also worked for Randy Boyd's unsuccessful Tennessee gubernatorial campaign in 2018.

== Early life ==
Saltsman was born in Nashville, Tennessee, to parents Bruce Saltsman and Edna Elaine Saltsman. He attended Father Ryan High School, a Catholic high school in Nashville, and then Christian Brothers University in Memphis, where he earned his bachelor's and master's in business administration degrees. While at Christian Brothers, Saltsman was active in the Sigma Alpha Epsilon fraternity, the Knights of Columbus and student government.

== Political career ==
=== 2000 election ===
Under Saltsman's watch as state party chairman in 2000, then-Governor George W. Bush defeated then-Vice President Al Gore in his home state of Tennessee.

=== Work with Bill Frist ===
In 2002 Saltsman worked as development director for Senator Bill Frist at the National Republican Senatorial Committee, where he helped Republicans regain control of the Senate after the defection of Senator Jim Jeffords handed the chamber to Democratic control in May 2001.

Saltsman then became senior political advisor to Frist at VOLPAC, a political action committee chaired by Frist and dedicated to recruitment and support of Republican candidates for political office nationwide. In 2004, eighteen of the twenty-two races that VOLPAC supported were successful. And, in 2006, VOLPAC helped ensure the election of Senator Bob Corker over Harold Ford Jr. in Tennessee.

Saltsman was also an important figure in Frist's preparations for a potential run for the Republican presidential nomination in 2008 and was labeled "Frist's secret weapon" by Chris Cillizza of The Washington Post and by Frist himself as: "a multi-talented superstar ... [who has] demonstrated uncanny, remarkable leadership in every endeavor he's undertaken".

=== Huckabee presidential campaign ===
Saltsman led Mike Huckabee's 2008 presidential campaign, picking up a major win in the 2008 Iowa Caucus. Saltsman was nominated by Marc Ambinder of The Atlantic as one of the top four campaign managers of the election cycle, and has since been labeled a "noted GOP strategist" with "a strong future on the national campaign-management stage."

=== Work with Sarah Huckabee Sanders ===
Saltsman serves as a senior advisor and media consultant to the first female governor of Arkansas, Sarah Huckabee Sanders. Saltsman was a key operative in Sanders' 2022 gubernatorial win, where Sanders' received 62.96% of the vote in the general election.

Saltsman's longtime friendship with Sanders began when Saltsman hired Sanders, (at the time Sarah Huckabee), to work on her father, Mike Huckabee's 2008 presidential campaign.

=== RNC chair candidacy ===
Saltsman announced his candidacy for RNC Chairman, after frequent mentions prior to announcing.

In his bid for the RNC chairmanship, Saltsman was endorsed by: former Republican presidential candidate Governor Mike Huckabee, former United States Senate Majority Leader Bill Frist, Tennessee Lt. Governor Ron Ramsey, and Tennessee House Majority Leader Jason Mumpower.

Saltsman dropped out one day before the voting following a controversy regarding Saltsman's distribution of a CD containing the song 'Barack the Magic Negro".

=== Fleischmann congressional campaign ===
After incumbent U.S. Representative Zach Wamp decided to leave Congress to run for governor of Tennessee, Saltsman became campaign manager for Chuck Fleischmann, an attorney and former talk radio host who sought the Republican nomination to succeed Wamp in the third congressional district seat. Mike Huckabee endorsed Fleischmann in March 2010. Fleischmann's biggest competition in the Republican primary was expected to come from former state GOP chairwoman Robin Smith. The U.S. House Republican whip Eric Cantor, chief deputy whip Representative Kevin McCarthy, the House Republican Conference chairman Mike Pence and Newt Gingrich had endorsed Smith. Fleischmann won the August 5, 2010, primary, topping a field of 11 candidates with about 30% of the vote and edging out second-place finisher Robin Smith, who earned 28%.

=== Tim James gubernatorial campaign ===
In 2008, Tim James hired Saltsman to serve as a senior advisor on his 2010 Alabama gubernatorial campaign. James ultimately came in third place in the primary and failed to make the runoff.

=== Randy Boyd gubernatorial campaign ===
Randy Boyd, who was previously the commissioner of the Tennessee Department of Economic and Community Development, announced in March 2017 that he would be running for governor in the 2018 election. Boyd tapped Saltsman to serve as the Campaign CEO.

Former Congresswoman Diane Black and Boyd as recently as June 2018 were considered to be the frontrunners to win the Republican primary. Bill Lee ended up winning the primary with 37% of the vote, followed by Boyd at 24% and Black at 23%, despite Boyd being the biggest spender in the governor's race. Black was second in spending.

Boyd’s campaign led by Saltsman was marred by infighting and hostility. One report said, “After opening a Shelby County HQ last Saturday, they capped the day by dressing down Shelby County’s GOP chairman and terrorizing diners at the GOP dinner that night. All because they weren’t treated the way they believed they deserved to be treated.”

=== Kris Kobach Senate Super PAC ===
Saltsman worked on Free Forever PAC in 2020, which supported Kris Kobach during the 2020 Kansas Senate primary.

=== 2020 Tennessee Senate Republican primary ===
During the 2020 Tennessee Senate Republican Primary, Saltsman was not part of either campaign, but towards the end of the campaign said the race would be a “photo finish” and hyped up Sethi’s chances.

Saltsman two weeks before Primary Day said, “You've got to give a lot of credit to Manny Sethi. He's worked hard. He's told a good story. He's put in the work. And now he's sitting two weeks before the election and it's going to be a photo finish in about two weeks."

Speaking about the Hagerty campaign, Saltsman said, “"I think what the campaign did, that endorsement you want to open with it and you want to close with it, their whole campaign was a Trump endorsement. And it kind of lost its sizzle along the way after 4 or 5 months of advertisement… The campaign has run the Trump endorsement a little too much.”

Bill Hagerty ended up winning the Tennessee Senate Republican primary by 11%.

=== Rusty Crowe congressional campaign ===
Phil Roe decided not to seek reelection in Tennessee's First Congressional District, setting up an open primary in 2020. State Senator Rusty Crowe (R-Johnson City), was considered an early favorite, having been a state senator nearly 30 years. Crowe led by 10% in a January poll conducted by Spry Strategies. Crowe switched up his advising team in June 2020, hiring Saltsman with less than a month left before early voting began.

Despite starting out with a lead in the polls and being one of the leading spenders in the race, Crowe finished in third place.

=== Matt Hullander Hamilton County mayoral campaign ===
Saltsman served as a consultant for Matt Hullander's 2022 Hamilton County Mayoral campaign. Despite, being the largest spender in the Republican primary, Hullander came in third place in the Republican primary.

=== Baxter Lee congressional campaign ===
After redistricting, Tennessee’s 5th Congressional District became a Republican friendly district – and a prime pickup opportunity. The new 5th Congressional District attracted many Republican candidates for the primary. Saltsman was named campaign manager for Baxter Lee, a Nashville businessman, was kicked off the ballot for not being a bonafide Republican.

=== Tennessee House Speaker Cameron Sexton ===
Saltsman serves as a senior advisor to Tennessee House Speaker Cameron Sexton. Sexton was first elected Speaker in 2019.

Saltsman was appointed by House Speaker Cameron Sexton to join the Tennessee Fish and Wildlife Commission in July 2022.

=== Mike Pence presidential campaign ===
Saltsman was part of Mike Pence’s 2024 presidential campaign. Saltsman served as the campaign chair.

Pence dropped out of the presidential race in October 2023.

== Controversies ==
=== 2009 RNC Chairmanship withdrawal ===
Saltsman was forced to drop out of the 2009 RNC Chairmanship election following a controversy regarding Saltsman's distribution of a CD containing the song “Barack the Magic Negro”, a satirical song mocking the David Ehrenstein opinion-editorial of the same name.

Party political offices
Preceded by Jim Burnett	Chair of the Tennessee Republican Party; 1999–2001	Succeeded by Beth Harwell
