= 2017 Republican National Committee chairmanship election =

← 2015	January 19, 2017	2019 →
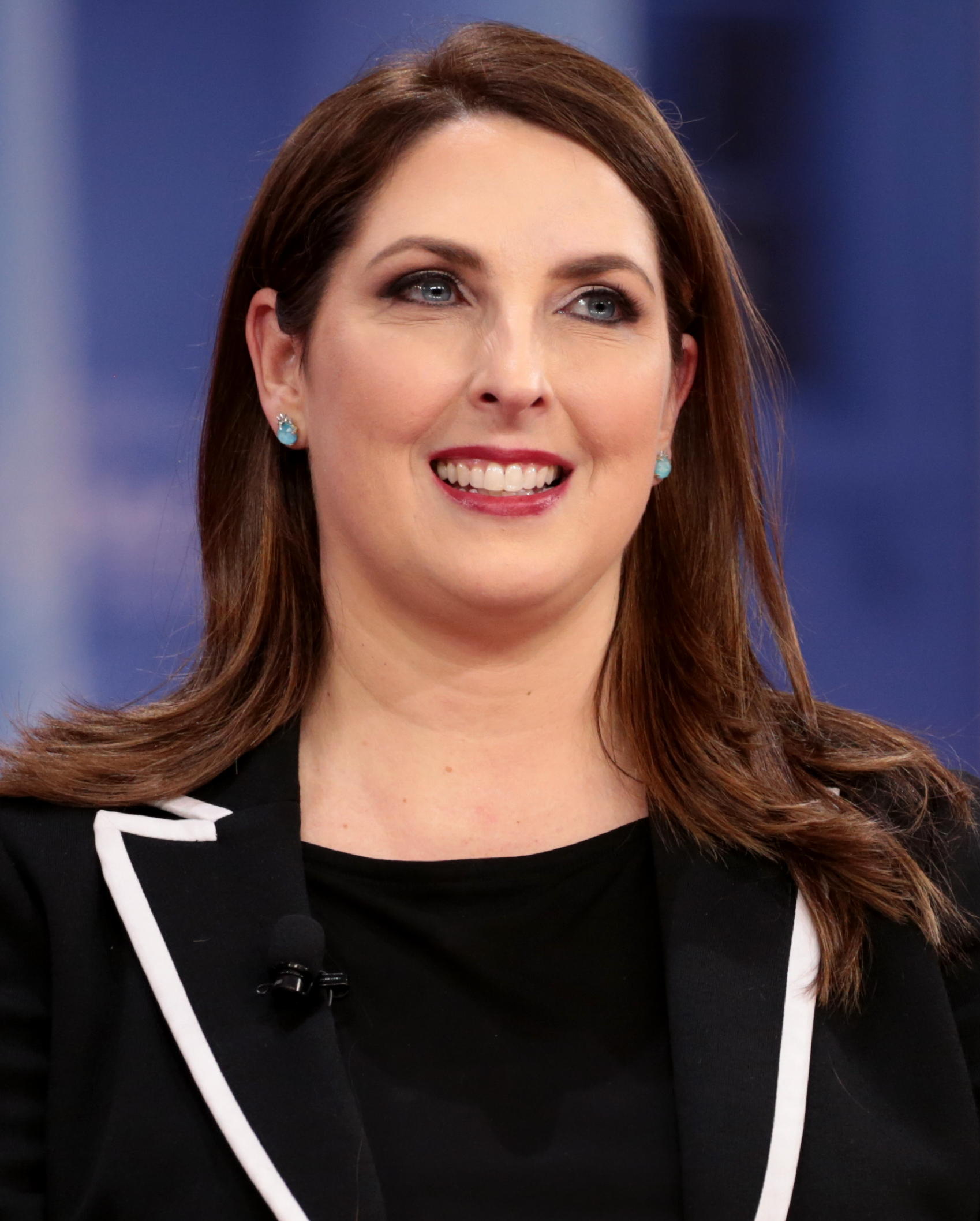
Candidate	Ronna McDaniel
Caucus vote	168
Percentage	100.0%
Chairman before election
Reince Priebus
Elected Chairwoman
Ronna McDaniel

The 2017 Republican National Committee (RNC) Chairperson election was held in January 2017, to determine the next chairperson of the Republican National Committee. The elected chair will be in charge of the national party activities during their two-year term.

== Background ==
Reince Priebus, the longest serving RNC chairman, did not run for reelection. Priebus had been named by President Donald Trump as his White House Chief of Staff.

On December 9, 2016, it was widely reported that President-elect Donald Trump intended to recommend Ronna Romney McDaniel as the person fill this post. On December 14, 2016, Trump announced that McDaniel was his recommendation to be the next chair of the Republican National Committee. The 168 members of the RNC, all of whom were elected at state and territorial conventions during the primaries and caucuses earlier in 2016, will decide and vote upon their next chair at their January 2017 meeting. Although historically the recommendation of the Republican nominee for the presidency is usually followed, there is no restriction on who the RNC members may eventually elect.

=== Candidates ===
Image	Name	Description
	Ronna Romney McDaniel	Chair of Michigan Republican Party, niece of governor and presidential candidate Mitt Romney, granddaughter of governor and presidential candidate George W. Romney, officially recommended by President-elect Trump for the role

=== Did not run ===
the following individuals did not run, despite speculation that they might become candidates:

Image	Name	Description
	Nick Ayers	Former executive director of the Republican Governors Association
	Matt Borges	Chair of Ohio Republican Party
	David Bossie	President and Chairman of Citizens United and Trump deputy campaign manager
	Chris Christie	Governor of New Jersey, 2016 presidential candidate
	Kellyanne Conway	Trump campaign manager; Republican strategist and pollster
	Robert Graham	Businessman and Chair of the Arizona Republican Party
	Matt Moore	Chair of South Carolina Republican Party
	Joe Nosef	Chair of the Mississippi Republican Party
	Matt Pinnell	National State Party Director at the Republican National Committee
	Mercedes Schlapp	Conservative commentator and columnist, Fox News contributor and wife of Matt Schlapp, the Chairman of the American Conservative Union
	John Whitbeck	Chair of Republican Party of Virginia
