= Daniel I. Ross Jr. =

Chairman of the South Carolina Republican Party
- In office 1977–1979
- Preceded by: Jesse L. Cooksey
- Succeeded by: Dr. George G. Graham

Personal details
- Born: Daniel Iradell Ross Jr. December 31, 1923 Blackville, South Carolina
- Died: April 15, 2008 (aged 84)
- Party: Republican
- Spouses: Goldie Jeanniene Prater Ross (m. 1955; died 1991); Helen Halford Barnes (m. 1992)
- Education: University of South Carolina (Geology, 1943); University of Texas

Daniel I. Ross Jr. (December 31, 1923 – April 15, 2008) was the chairman of the South Carolina Republican Party from 1977 to 1979.

Ross is credited with starting the First in the South Primary in South Carolina.

== Background ==
Ross served in World War II as a corporal in the U.S. Army in the China-Burma-India Theater, where he was wounded in the leg leading to a nine-month hospitalization. From 1953 to his retirement in 1986, he worked at the Savannah River Plant with environmental monitoring and health protection.

== Life in Politics ==
In 1960, Ross started a lifelong involvement with the South Carolina Republican Party when he served on Richard Nixon's campaign in Barnwell County. Later he would work on campaigns for or promote William D. Workman Jr., Floyd Spence, Jim Henderson, and Governor Jim Edwards.

Ross served two terms as Chairman of the South Carolina Republican Party, losing a third term to Dr. George C. Graham. During his term he was known for his fundraising and emphasis on grassroots campaigns. He would serve in the state party's executive committee until 2002.
