= Blake Sanders =

American politician from South Carolina

Member of the South Carolina House of Representatives from the 9th district
- Incumbent
- Assumed office November 11, 2024
- Preceded by: Anne Thayer

Personal details
- Party: Republican

Richard B. 'Blake' Sanders is an American politician. He is a member of the South Carolina House of Representatives from the 9th District, serving since 2024. He is a member of the Republican party.

== Political career ==
=== 2024 South Carolina House race ===
See also: 2024 South Carolina elections, 2024 state legislature elections in the United States, South Carolina House of Representatives elections, 2024 South Carolina House of Representatives election

In November 2023, Republican incumbent Anne Thayer announced that she would not run for re-election. Blake Sanders filed to compete in the Republican primary for the seat. He was endorsed by Americans for Prosperity.

Sanders defeated James Galyean in the Republican primary runoff. He had no opponent in the general election, winning the House seat in November.

Sanders serves on the House Legislative Oversight and the Medical, Military, Public and Municipal Affairs Committees.
