= Jesse L. Cooksey =

American politician (1932-2016)

Chairman of the South Carolina Republican Party
- In office 1977–1979
- Preceded by: C. Kenneth Powell
- Succeeded by: Dr. George G. Graham

Personal details
- Born: Jesse L. Cooksey; May 23, 1932 Spartanburg County, South Carolina, United States
- Died: 3 April 2016 (aged 83) Spartanburg, South Carolina, United States
- Party: Republican
- Spouse: Jean Cooksey

Jesse L. Cooksey (May 23, 1932 – April 3, 2016) was the chairman of the South Carolina Republican Party from 1974 to 1976. He presided over the party during the tumultuous period of Richard Nixon's resignation and Gerald Ford's term in office.
