= David Dows =

American politician (1885–1966)

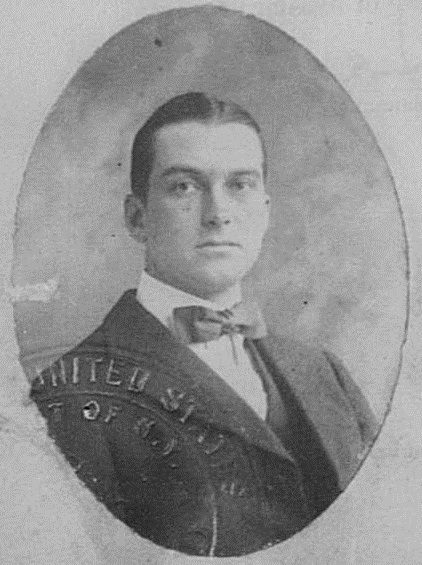
- Dows in 1915

Chair of the South Carolina Republican Party
- In office March 28, 1956 – March 26, 1958
- Preceded by: J. Bates Gerald
- Succeeded by: Gregory D. Shorey Jr.

Personal details
- Born: August 12, 1885 Irvington, New York, U.S.
- Died: August 13, 1966 (aged 81) Hot Springs, Virginia, U.S.
- Resting place: Sleepy Hollow Cemetery
- Party: Republican
- Spouse: Emily Weller Schweizer
- Education: Yale University

Military service
- Branch/service: United States Army
- Rank: Captain
- Battles/wars: World War I

David Dows III (August 12, 1885 – August 13, 1966) was an American politician from New York who served in South Carolina Republican politics. He served as Chair of the South Carolina Republican Party from 1956 to 1958.

== Early life ==
Dows was born on August 12, 1885, in Irvington, New York, the son of David Dows II and Jane Strahan. He attended Yale University where he graduated in 1908. He served in World War I with the rank of Captain on the Western Front.

== Political career ==
Dows began his political career in local New York, where he served as Sheriff of Nassau County and a member of the New York Racing Commission. In South Carolina, he was a Republican Candidate for Congress in 1952. He served as a delegate to the 1956 Republican National Convention, and responsible for patronage during the Eisenhower administration. He was elected chair of the South Carolina Republican Party on March 28, 1956 and served until he resigned on March 26, 1958.

== Personal life ==
Throughout his life, he was an avid sports enthusiast. He died on August 13, 1966, in Hot Springs, Virginia, a day after his 81st birthday due to a heart attack. He was survived by his wife, Emily Weller Schweizer, daughter, and three stepchildren. His son was killed in a plane accident on November 25, 1964. He is interred at Sleepy Hollow Cemetery in New York.
