= Anne Thayer =

American politician from South Carolina

Member of the South Carolina House of Representatives from the 9th district
- In office 2011–2024
- Preceded by: Michael Dwain D. Thompson
- Succeeded by: Blake Sanders

Personal details
- Born: April 13, 1961 (age 65) Greenville, South Carolina, U.S.
- Party: Republican

Anne J. Thayer (born April 13, 1961) is an American politician. She was a member of the South Carolina House of Representatives from the 9th District from 2011 to 2024. She is a member of the Republican party.

== Political career ==
Thayer chaired the House Rules Committee.

=== 2024 South Carolina House race ===
See also: 2024 South Carolina elections, 2024 state legislature elections in the United States, South Carolina House of Representatives elections, 2024 South Carolina House of Representatives election

In November 2023, Thayer announced that she would not run for re-election. Rick Bradshaw, James Galyean and Blake Sanders filed to compete in the Republican primary for the seat. Sanders won the seat in the general election.
