= Drew McKissick =

American politician (born 1968)

Chair of the South Carolina Republican Party
- Incumbent
- Assumed office May 13, 2017
- Preceded by: Matt Moore

Co-Chair of the Republican National Committee
- In office January 28, 2023 – March 8, 2024
- Leader: Ronna McDaniel
- Preceded by: Thomas O. Hicks Jr.
- Succeeded by: Lara Trump

Personal details
- Born: Martin Andrew McKissick; December 1968 (age 57)
- Party: Republican
- Spouse: Amy McKissick
- Education: College of Charleston (BA)

Martin Andrew McKissick (born December 1968) is an American politician who has served as chair of the South Carolina Republican Party since 2017. In 2025, he was re-elected to a record fifth term as State Chairman. McKissick also served as co-chair of the Republican National Committee from 2023 to 2024, when he was replaced by Lara Trump.

== Career ==
McKissick was endorsed by Donald Trump during a previous challenge for state party chair. Presidential candidate Vivek Ramaswamy floated McKissick's name as a replacement for national Republican Party Chair Ronna McDaniel. McKissick was elected co-chair of the Republican National Committee on January 28, 2023.

McKissick was widely quoted after the 2022 South Carolina general election produced what many news outlets called a 'red wave', with a number of Democratic Party legislators losing their seats, and Republicans gaining a super majority in the state legislature.

On February 26, 2024, McKissick submitted his resignation as Republican National Committee co-chair, stating that he would be working with the Trump Campaign and the RNC to win both the Senate and the White House.

On November 15, 2024, the South Carolina State Election Commission certified a new Republican supermajority in the South Carolina Senate, the first time since Reconstruction. McKissick stated, “It was the biggest Republican wave in this state since Ronald Reagan.”

Party political offices
Preceded by Matt Moore	Chair of the South Carolina Republican Party; 2013–present	Incumbent
