= Harry S. Dent Sr. =

American journalist

Harry Dent

Chair of the South Carolina Republican Party
- In office 1965–1969
- Preceded by: Drake Edens
- Succeeded by: Raymond A. Harris

Personal details
- Born: Harry Shuler Dent Sr. February 21, 1930 St. Matthews, South Carolina, U.S.
- Died: October 28, 2007 (aged 77) Columbia, South Carolina, U.S.
- Party: Republican
- Children: Harry Dent Jr.
- Education: Presbyterian College (BA); George Washington University (LLB, LLM)

Harry Shuler Dent Sr. (February 21, 1930 – October 28, 2007) was an American political strategist considered one of the architects of the Republican Southern Strategy. One of the South's leading power brokers, he was instrumental in securing the votes to get Richard Nixon nominated for President at the 1968 Republican National Convention. He was the father of the financial prognosticator, Harry S. Dent Jr.

== Biography ==
Harry Shuler Dent, Sr. was born on February 21, 1930, in St. Matthews, South Carolina, to Hampton Nathaniel Dent, Sr. and Sally Prickett. He earned a Bachelor of Arts degree from Presbyterian College in Clinton, South Carolina, in 1951, the same year he married Elizabeth Inez Francis. From 1951 to 1953, Dent served in the United States Army, attaining the rank of first lieutenant in the 24th Infantry Division, Far East Command.

Between 1955 and 1965, Dent worked as an administrative assistant to U.S. Senator Strom Thurmond. During this period, he earned an LL.B. degree from George Washington University Law School in 1957 and an LL.M. from Georgetown University Law Center in 1959. In 1962, he co-founded and chaired the Senate Staff Prayer Breakfast Group. He also chaired the Thurmond Speaks for Goldwater Committee during Barry Goldwater’s 1964 presidential campaign.

In 1965, Dent entered private legal practice as a partner at the firm Dent and Kennedy, where he remained until 1969. He simultaneously rose within Republican Party ranks, serving as chairman of the South Carolina Republican Party from 1965 to 1968 and managing statewide campaigns, including the 1966 South Carolina Republican campaign and the Thurmond Speaks for Nixon–Agnew Committee in 1968.

Dent joined the Nixon administration in 1969, initially as Deputy Counsel to President Richard Nixon. He later became Special Counsel to the President, a role he held until resigning in December 1972. After leaving the White House, he returned to legal practice, first with Whaley, McCutchen, Blanton and Dent (1973–1974), then as senior partner at Dent, Kirkland, Taylor and Wilson until 1981. During this time, he also served as General Counsel to the Republican National Committee from 1973 to 1974.

In 1974, Dent pleaded guilty to a misdemeanour campaign finance violation related to fundraising for the Nixon administration. He was sentenced to unsupervised parole. Despite this setback, he continued to play an active role in Republican politics, acting as Southern Campaign Manager and a member of the National Campaign Steering Committee for President Gerald Ford’s 1976 reelection bid.

He also participated on the Campaign Advisory Committee of the Republican National Committee and was appointed as the President’s representative to the Sabine River Compact Administration from 1977 to 1978. Dent later worked on George H. W. Bush’s 1980 presidential campaign.

In 1981, Dent shifted his focus from politics to faith-based initiatives. He enrolled at Columbia Bible College (now Columbia International University), earning a Certificate in Bible Studies in 1982. He subsequently served as Director of the Billy Graham Lay Center in Asheville, North Carolina, from 1982 to 1985. In 1985, Dent and his wife founded Laity Alive and Serving, Inc., a lay ministry aimed at encouraging Christian service and leadership.

Dent also authored multiple books throughout his life, addressing both political and religious themes. His works include The Prodigal South Returns to Power (1978), Layman Looks Through the Bible for God's Will (1983), Right vs. Wrong: Solutions to the American Nightmare (1992, co-authored with Elizabeth Dent), Cover Up: The Watergate in All of Us (1996), and Teaching Jack and Jill Right vs. Wrong in the Homes and Schools: A Primer on Character Education (1996).

=== Death ===
Dent died from complications of Alzheimer’s disease on September 28, 2007, in Columbia, South Carolina.
