= Karen Floyd =

American politician

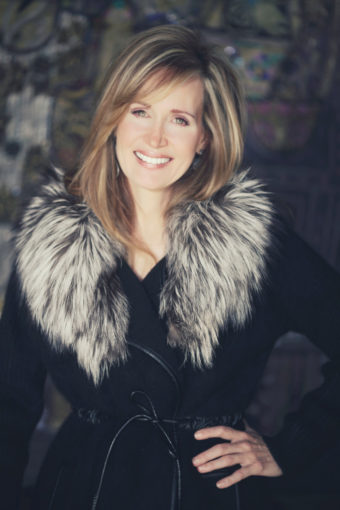
- Floyd in 2016

Chair of the South Carolina Republican Party
- In office May 2009 – May 7, 2011
- Preceded by: Katon Dawson
- Succeeded by: Chad Connelly

Personal details
- Party: Republican
- Education: University of South Carolina School of Law (1986)
- Website: http://www.karenfloyd.com/

Karen Floyd is an American publisher, filmmaker, attorney, and former politician from South Carolina. She was the first woman to serve as chair of the Spartanburg County Council and chaired the South Carolina Republican Party from 2009 to 2011. In 2006, she was the Republican nominee for South Carolina Superintendent of Education, losing by a narrow margin. Floyd is the founder and chief executive officer of The Palladian Group, a marketing and communications firm, and the publisher of Elysian, a women's lifestyle magazine. Her career includes work in law, business, politics, media, and film production.

== Education ==
At the age of 16, Floyd passed the French baccalaureate entrance examinations in Philosophy and Literature at Notre Dame. She earned her bachelor's degree from Goucher College in Maryland and a Juris Doctor from the University of South Carolina School of Law, where she served as president of the Student Bar Association. She attended the Aspen Institute and is a Liberty Fellow, Class of 2008. She speaks French and Arabic.

== Career ==
Floyd began her career as a prosecutor in South Carolina's 7th Judicial Circuit, concentrating on cases of child abuse and sexual assault. She later became a partner at the law firm King, Hray and Kanes. In 1992, she was appointed a magistrate judge in Spartanburg County and subsequently became Chief Magistrate, the first woman to hold that role in the state. During her tenure, Floyd implemented operational changes aimed at reducing costs and increasing efficiency. She served as chief magistrate from 1992 to 1994 before transitioning to the private sector.

After leaving the judiciary, Floyd joined Flagstar Corporation, the parent company of the Denny's restaurant chain, El Pollo Loco, Hardee's, Quincy's Family Steakhouse and Volume Services, where she held various executive roles, including vice president. In 1999, she established The Palladian Group, a marketing, technology, and development firm. In 2015, Floyd founded Palladian Publications and began publishing Elysian magazine, with the first issue released in February 2016.

Floyd has served on the boards of the S.C. Department of Natural Resources, the S.C. Ports Authority (where she was treasurer until her term ended in 2013), the Palmetto Conservation Foundation, the Spartanburg Area Chamber of Commerce, the Spartanburg Development Council, and The Arts Partnership of Spartanburg.

=== Political career ===
Floyd was elected to the Spartanburg County Council in 1998 and became its first and only female chair. She served on the council for four years. In 2006, she was the Republican nominee for South Carolina Superintendent of Education, advocating for policies such as school choice and tax credits for private school tuition. The election was decided by a margin of only 455 votes, with Democrat Jim Rex declared the winner.

In 2009, Floyd was elected chair of the South Carolina Republican Party, becoming the first woman to hold the post. She led the party during the 2010 midterm elections with positive results, as Republicans swept all of the statewide offices, but did not seek reelection and concluded her term in 2011.

=== Media and publications ===
After her tenure in political office, Floyd expanded into media and publishing. In 2011, she launched Palladian View, a digital platform for conservative women in the Republican Party. In 2015, she founded Elysian Magazine, whose mission is "Women Inspiring Women".

Floyd has served as executive producer on four documentary films: two related to CatWalk FurBaby, which documents a charity fashion event benefiting animal rescue organizations, and two films about the war in Ukraine. Fight for Ukraine: 12 Women’s War documents the perspectives of Ukrainian women and has received multiple film festival awards. Floyd met the film's subjects during her travels in Ukraine in early 2023. Later that year, she returned to Ukraine to produce Ukraine: For the Children, a 93-minute documentary. The film premiered at a private screening in Charleston, South Carolina, on July 30, 2024. An abbreviated version was screened at the Kennedy Center in Washington, D.C., and another screening was held in Rome in conjunction with a Vatican panel on world peace, moderated by Floyd.

In May 2025, Floyd was awarded the Âme de lumière ("Soul of Light") Impact in Cinema Award at the Cannes Sustainable Responsibility Gala.

== Personal life ==
Floyd resides in Spartanburg, South Carolina, with her husband, Gordon Floyd. They have two sons. In 2010, she received the Order of the Palmetto, South Carolina's highest civilian award.

Party political offices
Preceded by Katon Dawson	Chairman of the South Carolina Republican Party; May, 2009 - May 7, 2011	Succeeded by Chad Connelly
Preceded by Dan Hiltgen	Republican nominee for South Carolina Superintendent of Education; 2006	Succeeded by Mick Zais
