= Matt Moore (politician) =

US politician (born 1982)

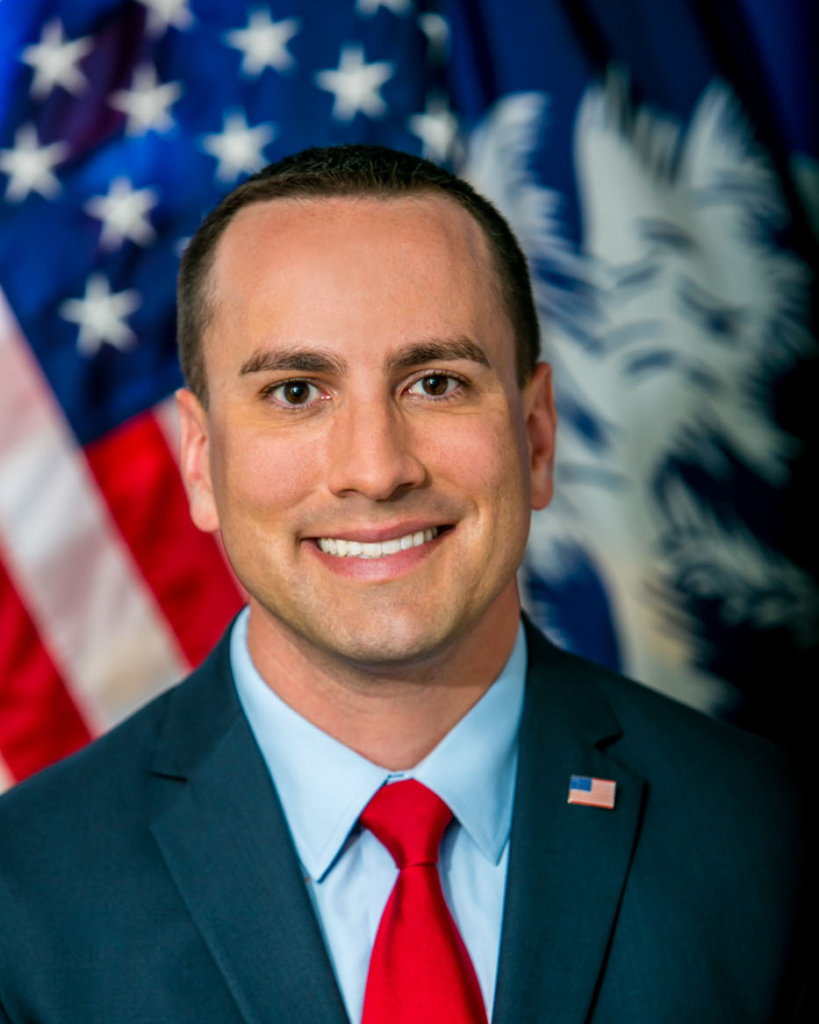

Chair of the South Carolina Republican Party
- In office June 8, 2013 – May 13, 2017
- Preceded by: Chad Connelly
- Succeeded by: Drew McKissick

Personal details
- Born: Donald Matthew Moore; April 22, 1982 (age 44) Tifton, Georgia, U.S.
- Party: Republican
- Spouse: Meg
- Education: Georgia Institute of Technology (BS); University of South Carolina (MA)

Donald Matthew Moore (born April 22, 1982) is an American political commentator and Republican political strategist who served as the 18th chairman of the South Carolina Republican Party from 2013 to 2017. For most of his two terms, he was the youngest state chairman in America's two major political parties.

== Early life, education, and early career ==
Moore was born and raised in Tifton, Georgia. Moore attended Georgia Tech, where he majored in industrial engineering and minored in pre-law. At Georgia Tech, Moore was a Presidential Scholar, the highest academic scholarship awarded to undergraduate students. He graduated with honors in 2005. After working for Republican political organizations including the Georgia Republican Party and the Republican Governors Association, Moore moved to South Carolina in 2007 to work for then-governor Mark Sanford.

Moore attended business school at the University of South Carolina, where in 2014 he earned a master's degree in Economics. His research thesis, "The Economic Impact of South Carolina's 2012 Republican Presidential Primary," received state and national press coverage.

He served as the South Carolina Republican Party's executive director during the 2011–2012 election cycle and as a senior staffer for United States Senator Tim Scott before his election.

== Political career ==
Moore has served as a commentator for Fox News, CNN, MSNBC, The Wall Street Journal, The Washington Post, and The New York Times. On June 12, 2014, he earned the national New York Times "Quotation of the Day" for describing the power of grassroots activists in the social media era. On May 2, 2015, Moore was re-elected to a second term. He won 83% of the vote.

In April 2016, Moore was mentioned as a possible candidate for chairman of the Republican National Committee. An editorial in The Post and Courier stated the "Republican National Committee probably needs to move Matt Moore to the top of its short list."

In July 2016, Moore served as co-chairman of the South Carolina delegation to the 2016 Republican National Convention and as a member of the convention's powerful Rules Committee.

In November 2016, Moore's name appeared on a short list of candidates under consideration to replace Republican National Committee chairman Reince Priebus. Michigan Republican Party chairwoman Ronna Romney McDaniel was eventually chosen by then-President-elect Donald Trump as his recommendation to replace Priebus.

In December 2016, Moore served as a member of the Presidential Electoral College. On February 4, 2017, Moore announced that he would not seek a third term as chairman of the South Carolina Republican Party. In 2018, he joined political consulting firm First Tuesday Strategies as a partner.

== Personal life ==
Moore has two siblings, including a twin brother. He is married to Meg LeHeup and they have one child.

Despite being in rival parties, Moore is friends with former South Carolina Democratic Party chairman Jaime Harrison. They co-taught a class together at University of South Carolina during the fall semester of 2015.

Moore is a member of Liberty Fellowship, a partner of the Aspen Institute, and is a member of the Aspen Global Leadership Network.

Party political offices
Preceded by Chad Connelly	Chair of the South Carolina Republican Party; 2013–2017	Succeeded by Drew McKissick
