= Harmeet Dhillon =

American lawyer and politician

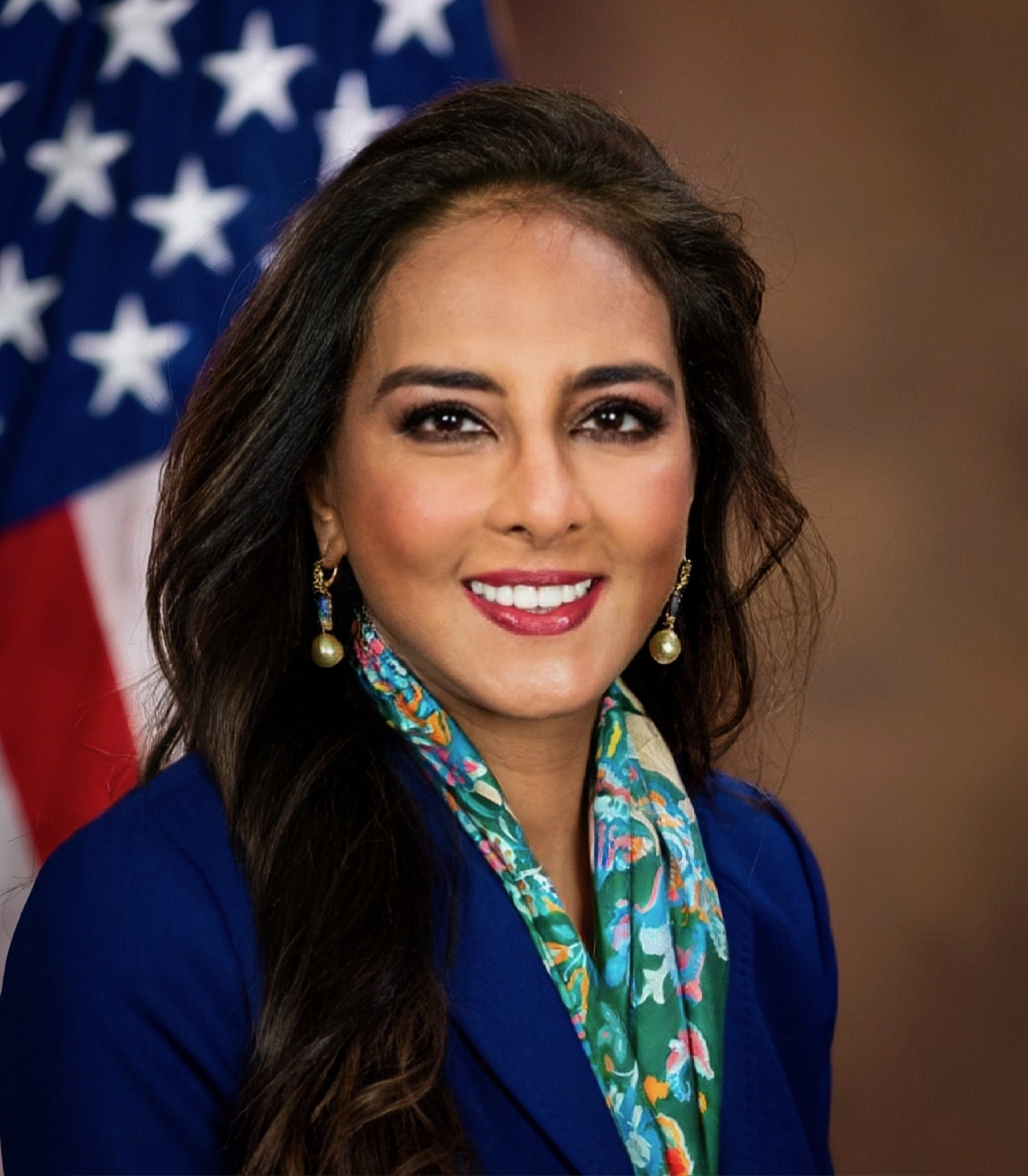
- Official portrait, 2025

United States Assistant Attorney General for the Civil Rights Division
- In office April 7, 2025 – November 5, 2026
- President: Donald Trump
- Preceded by: Kristen Clarke
- Succeeded by: Craig Trainor (Acting)

Republican National Committeewoman from California
- In office July 19, 2016 – April 7, 2025
- Preceded by: Linda Ackerman
- Succeeded by: Connie Conway

Personal details
- Born: Harmeet Kaur Dhillon; October 2, 1968 (age 58) Chandigarh, India
- Citizenship: United States
- Party: Republican
- Spouse(s): D. Singh (m. 1989; div. 1991) Kanwarjit Singh (m. 1994; div. 2004) Sarvjit Randhawa (m. 2011; died 2024)
- Education: Dartmouth College (BA); University of Virginia (JD)
- Website: Official website

Harmeet Kaur Dhillon (born October 2, 1968) is an American lawyer who served as the U.S. assistant attorney general for the Civil Rights Division from 2025 until her resignation in 2026. A member of the Republican Party, she is the former vice chair of the California Republican Party and a former Republican National Committeewoman for California.

She is the founder of a law practice called Dhillon Law Group Inc. In 2018, she helped launch the 501(c)(3) conservative nonprofit Center for American Liberty, which does legal work related to civil liberties. During the COVID-19 pandemic in the United States, Dhillon filed numerous unsuccessful lawsuits to halt the implementation of stay-at-home-orders and other restrictions. She criticized face masks requirements, called for the re-opening of the economy, and opposed mail-in voting.

In the 2023 Republican National Committee chairmanship election, Dhillon unsuccessfully challenged incumbent Ronna McDaniel. In December 2024, then president-elect Donald Trump nominated Dhillon to serve as the assistant attorney general for civil rights.

In November 2026, after the 2026 midterms, Dhillon resigned from the Civil Rights Division.

== Early life and education ==
Dhillon was born in Chandigarh, India, to a Punjabi Sikh family in 1968 or 1969. Her family first moved to London before eventually settling in the United States, so her father Tejpal Singh Dhillon could pursue training and a career as an orthopedic surgeon. Dhillon attended elementary school in the Bronx, New York, before moving with her family to Smithfield, North Carolina, when her father became part of a medical practice there.

Dhillon graduated from the North Carolina School of Science and Mathematics at age 16. She then graduated from Dartmouth College in 1989 with a Bachelor of Arts in classics. As an undergraduate at Dartmouth, she became the editor-in-chief of The Dartmouth Review. During her tenure at The Review, a satirical column criticizing the school's president and the policies of his administration generated controversy. In the column, Dartmouth College president James O. Freedman, who was Jewish, was likened to Adolf Hitler due to the alleged discriminatory policies of his administration against conservatives. These policies were referred to by the column as a "holocaust" and the "Final Solution to the Conservative Problem". The column also characterized conservatives at Dartmouth as being "deported in cattle cars in the night".

Dhillon claimed that the column sought to draw parallels between fascism and what she terms "liberal fascism". She stated that there was no intention to minimize the horrors of the Holocaust and that the column sought to demonstrate the alleged mistreatment that conservative students faced under Freedman's administration. After graduating from Dartmouth, she attended the University of Virginia School of Law, where she became an editor of the Virginia Law Review and earned her Juris Doctor (JD) in 1993.

== Legal career ==
Following law school, Dhillon clerked for Judge Paul V. Niemeyer of the U.S. Court of Appeals for the Fourth Circuit from 1993 to 1994. For the next ten years, Dhillon became an associate at a number of law firms before becoming a managing partner at the law firm named for herself, Dhillon Law Group, which was founded in 2006.

=== Lawsuits ===
Dhillon filed a lawsuit in April 2017 against University of California, Berkeley on behalf of the Berkeley College Republicans (BCR) and Young America's Foundation for freedom of speech issues, particularly the school cancelling Ann Coulter's speech quoting security reasons. The suit was settled in December 2018, with Dhillon arguing that it had forced the university to change its policies about controversial speakers, whereas the university maintained that it had already been following the amended policies before.

In August 2017, James Damore, a former Google employee, hired Dhillon to be his lawyer against Google. Dhillon's firm has said it is also willing to represent more employees from Google who have similar stories to Damore, although Dhillon has already lost an appeal to the National Labor Relations Board. Damore's lawsuit against Google also was dismissed pursuant to a mandatory arbitration clause; however, the case continues without him.

Conservative social media influencer and activist Andy Ngo retained Dhillon as his attorney after being assaulted on the street in Portland, Oregon, in June 2019. In June 2020, Dhillon filed suit on behalf of Ngo against antifa seeking $900,000 in damages for assault and emotional distress, and an injunction to prevent further harassment. The lawsuit cited Rose City Antifa, five other named defendants, and additional unknown assailants. It stemmed from multiple alleged attacks on Ngo in Portland during 2019 and accused Rose City Antifa in particular of a "pattern of racketeering activities". He subsequently lost the lawsuit when the jury did not find enough evidence to support his claim.

==== COVID-19 pandemic ====
During the COVID-19 pandemic in California, Dhillon was behind many lawsuits challenging the state's response to the pandemic including restrictions imposed by stay-at-home orders. On April 13 and 24, 2020, Dhillon filed suits against the state of California challenging its stay-at-home order. On behalf of two pastors in Riverside County, two parishioners in San Bernardino County, and seven businesses, including restaurants, a pet grooming shop, and a gondola company, she argued that their constitutional rights were being violated. Dhillon also filed lawsuits against the governors of New Jersey and Virginia over their restrictions on religious services. Most of these lawsuits were filed through the Center for American Liberty. Dhillon later argued that her lawsuits led to "large sectors of California’s economy opening up much sooner than the governor originally intended", which in the assessment of The New York Times contributed to an "alarming surge in cases" in the second half of June. She criticized California's decision to send mail-in ballots to all registered voters for the 2020 election and, regarding California's approach to the pandemic, she asserted it uncovered its propensity to overreach, “The Constitution is not suspended in a pandemic, any more than it was suspended in every war that we’ve had in this country.’’ In July 2020, it was reported that she was suing state and local governments in California to keep nail salons and barbers open and to prevent the closure of schools during the pandemic.

In May 2020, Dhillon criticized Virginia for requiring the use of face masks in public. She claimed that "the masks don't work" (contradicting the recommendation of health experts and the US CDC). In June 2020, she criticized California for requiring the use of face masks in public when individuals were unable to physically distance. She argued that people should be free to make their own decisions. She called on California to reopen its economy, even though coronavirus cases were surging. In July 2020, she said that she was considering filing a lawsuit over a restriction on singing or chanting in church to prevent the spread of the coronavirus. She filed a lawsuit against Hawaii when the state required that visitors to Hawaii undergo quarantine upon arrival. In July 2020, a judge ruled that the emergency mandate was a reasonable response to the public health threat posed by the coronavirus. On April 17, 2024, Dhillon testified in front of the House Judiciary Committee to demonstrate the supposed violations of civil rights that took place during the Covid pandemic. She argued that during the pandemic that fundamental rights were taken simply because the government declared an emergency. Dhillon expressed that she was alarmed that an emergency, when perceived by the government as such, could lead to such an abrupt “erosion of our freedoms and the complete disregard for the judicial scrutiny the courts use to preserve them in every other instance.”

==== Detransitioning case ====
On February 22, 2023, Dhillon's firm filed a lawsuit against Kaiser Permanente over misinformation and medical damage experienced by Chloe Cole, an 18-year-old detransitioner from Central Valley, California. The letter of intent to sue — addressed to Kaiser, a named endocrinologist, a named psychiatrist, and a named plastic surgeon — claimed that Cole suffers from ongoing health effects from off-label use of prescription drugs. Cole says she was not properly informed as to potential negative effects of the puberty blockers and testosterone she was given at age 13. She also had a double mastectomy as a gender-affirming surgery at age 15 (legal in California). The lawsuit claims that Cole did not give informed consent and that she was under extreme duress to accede to the medical treatments.

=== Legal representations ===
==== Trump 2020 campaign legal adviser ====
She was a legal adviser on the Trump 2020 campaign. While the Trump campaign was making claims of voter fraud during the 2020 election (as the ballots were being counted), Dhillon said the campaign was hoping that the U.S. Supreme Court, including Trump-appointed justices such as Amy Coney Barrett, would help Trump win the presidency.

==== Carlson lawsuit ====
In 2023, Dhillon was hired by Tucker Carlson to represent him in a gender discrimination lawsuit filed by former Fox News producer Abby Grossberg.

== Political career ==
=== Early career ===
In 2008, Dhillon ran for a seat in the California Assembly. She lost the race, garnering 17% of the vote in the traditionally Democratic district. She ran for the California Senate in 2012, but was again unsuccessful. She served as the chair of the San Francisco Republican Party. Dhillon became a board member of the northern California chapter of the American Civil Liberties Union (ACLU) after the September 11 attacks, in connection with her work on discrimination against Sikhs and other South Asians, and stayed on the board for three years. She has been heavily criticized by Republican activists for her ties to the ACLU, as well as her past contributions to the political campaigning of Kamala Harris.

=== Rise to prominence ===
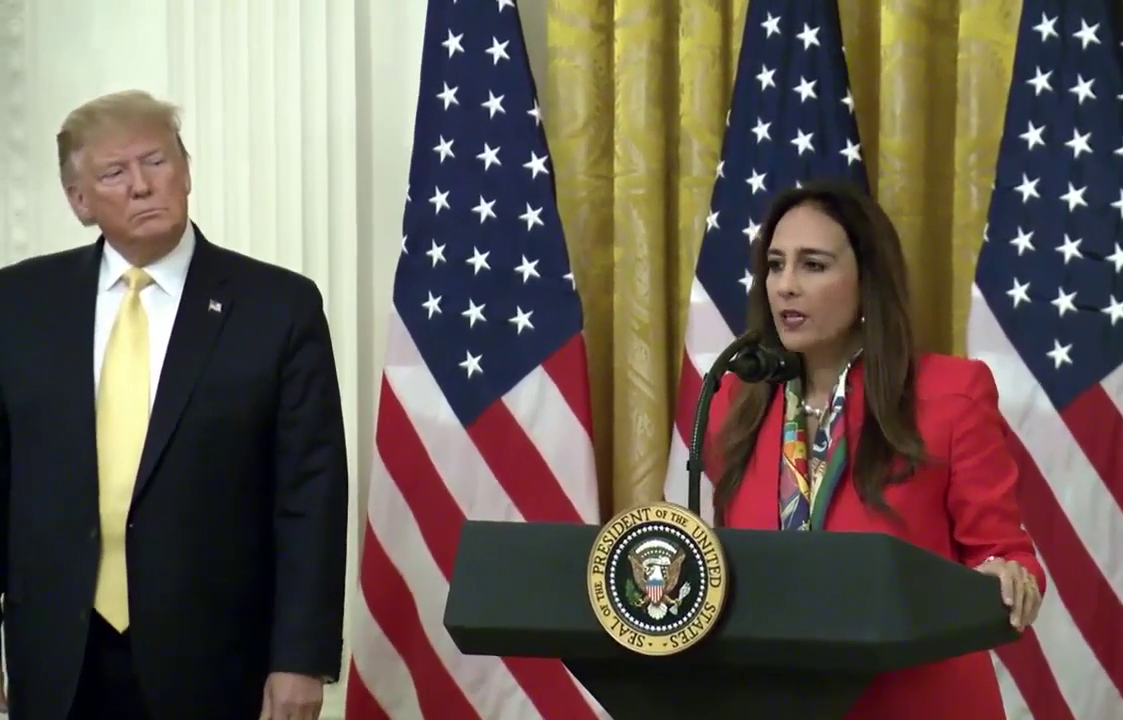
Dhillon with President Donald Trump in 2019

Dhillon was chosen to be a member of the California Republican Party's board in 2013 and a Republican National Committeewoman from California in 2016. She gave the opening prayer at the 2016 Republican National Convention. Dhillon led the successful effort to remove Chad Mayes as the California State Assembly Republican caucus leader in August 2017.

A supporter of Donald Trump, Dhillon gave a speech at his "Social Media Summit" on July 11, 2019, and she was a co-chair of Women for Trump. In early 2017, Dhillon interviewed to be the Assistant Attorney General for Civil Rights in the U.S. Department of Justice (DOJ). She was not nominated for the position in Trump's first term.

Dhillon performed a Sikh prayer, the Ardās, at the 2024 Republican National Convention. It was met with backlash on social media by far-right political figures such as Lauren Witzke, Nick Fuentes, and Stew Peters. In October 2024, Dhillon took part in an interview with Tucker Carlson on The Tucker Carlson Show to discuss criticisms of Kamala Harris in both her political and legal career. A regular guest on Fox News, she has described Laura Ingraham as a "long-time mentor." Dhillon was chosen by the Arizona Republican Party in 2024 to run its election integrity operation.

==== 2023 Republican National Committee chairmanship election ====
In December 2022, Dhillon announced her candidacy to challenge Ronna McDaniel as chairperson of the Republican National Committee. During the race, conservative activist Scott Presler published the email addresses and Twitter account names of RNC committee members on a website called "hireharmeet.com", which Dhillon shared on Twitter. In January 2023, Dhillon reportedly faced a whisper campaign from supporters of McDaniel and of Mike Lindell focusing on her Sikh faith. On January 11, 2023, McDaniel disavowed the attacks, citing her own minority Mormon faith. On January 27, 2023, Dhillon would lose to McDaniel in a 111–51 vote.

=== Assistant Attorney General for Civil Rights ===
On December 9, 2024, Dhillon was nominated by then President‑elect Trump to serve as Assistant Attorney General for Civil Rights in the Department of Justice. Her nomination was confirmed on April 3, 2025, by a Senate vote of 52–45, making her the first Republican woman and first Republican of Indian origin to head the division.

==== Shift in division priorities ====
Upon entering office on April 7, 2025, Dhillon issued new mission statements across all eleven sections of the Civil Rights Division, refocusing its work toward themes including combating antisemitism (especially on campus protests), gun rights enforcement, religious liberty (often framed as anti‑Christian bias), challenges to transgender participation in women's sports, and dismantling diversity, equity, and inclusion (DEI) culture. This led to widespread departures and reassignments: over half of the division's roughly 380 attorneys either submitted resignations or accepted deferred separation offers, reducing the enforcement staff to around 105 members. Dhillon publicly welcomed these departures as aligning the division with the administration's agenda and asserted that new hires were available to refill aligned roles.

Shortly after taking office, Dhillon's division launched investigations into DEI and affirmative-action policies at public institutions. The DOJ opened a civil rights investigation into Minnesota's Department of Human Services, deeming its requirement that supervisors justify hiring candidates from non‑underrepresented groups as potentially illegal race and sex discrimination. Parallel probes were launched into hiring practices at George Mason University and the University of California system. In higher education, the DOJ's pressure led to the resignation of the University of Virginia president after he failed to dismantle DEI programs, a clear indication of the administration's broad DEI crackdown.

In May 2025, Dhillon's leadership prompted the DOJ to formally cancel consent decrees with the Minneapolis and Louisville police departments—agreements reached under prior administrations to address systemic misconduct. Investigations in other jurisdictions were suspended or reversed, with critics warning these moves strip away federal oversight structures essential for police accountability. Concurrently, enforcement actions concerning voting rights, systemic employment discrimination, disability access, housing discrimination, and police misconduct were de‑emphasized or dropped entirely. Civil rights advocates and former division officials have criticized this shift as a departure from the division's statutory mandate to protect marginalized communities.

Dhillon signed the DOJ letter in the 2025 Texas redistricting.

After the 2025 Brown University shooting, Dhillon amplified a theory misidentifying a pro-Palestinian Brown University undergraduate student as the perpetrator. A different individual, Claudio Neves Valente, was subsequently identified as the shooter.

In January 2026, it was reported that Dhillon had decided that the Civil Rights Division would not open an investigation into whether ICE agent Jonathan Ross's involvement in the killing of Renée Good violated her federal rights. This led to the resignation of the criminal section chief, principal deputy chief, deputy chief, and acting deputy chief.

When Trump forced Attorney General Pam Bondi to resign in April 2026, according to The Washington Post, Dhillon tried to maneuver for a more senior position in the Justice Department, and was unsuccessful, leading to strained relations with other top Justice Department officials.

The former civil rights division lawyer Stacey Young, head of the justice department alumni group Justice Connection, characterized Dhillon as "the most destructive, lawless and hateful head of the civil rights division in DoJ history".

In the months ahead of the 2026 midterm elections, Dhillon sent letters to all the states of the United States that criminal chargers may occur if non-citizens were allowed to vote. According to The Washington Post cases of electoral fraud represent an infinitesimal number of ballots cast.

On November 5, 2026, Dhillon resigned from her position. In a letter to Trump, she stated that she had informed White House Chief of Staff Susie Wiles in early October of her intention to resign, wanting to return to her private practice. Fox News reported that she had been asked by a White House official to delay her resignation until after the midterm elections.

== Personal life ==
Dhillon began an arranged marriage with a physician, D. Singh, in 1989 that ended in divorce in 1991, with Dhillon describing the relationship as abusive. She married her second husband, Kanwarjit Singh, in 1994; the couple divorced in 2004. Her third marriage was to Sarvjit Singh Randhawa, lasting 13 years. Randhawa died in 2024 of Parkinson's disease and cancer.

Dhillon is an avid knitter. She describes herself as a "knitter" before "lawyer," and regularly posts photos of her knitting projects to her Instagram and X accounts. On December 28, 2025, Dhillon tweeted a photo of a knit cap with the caption, "This hat is an hour behind schedule thanks to influencer retards."
