= C. Kenneth Powell =

American politician (1939–2019)

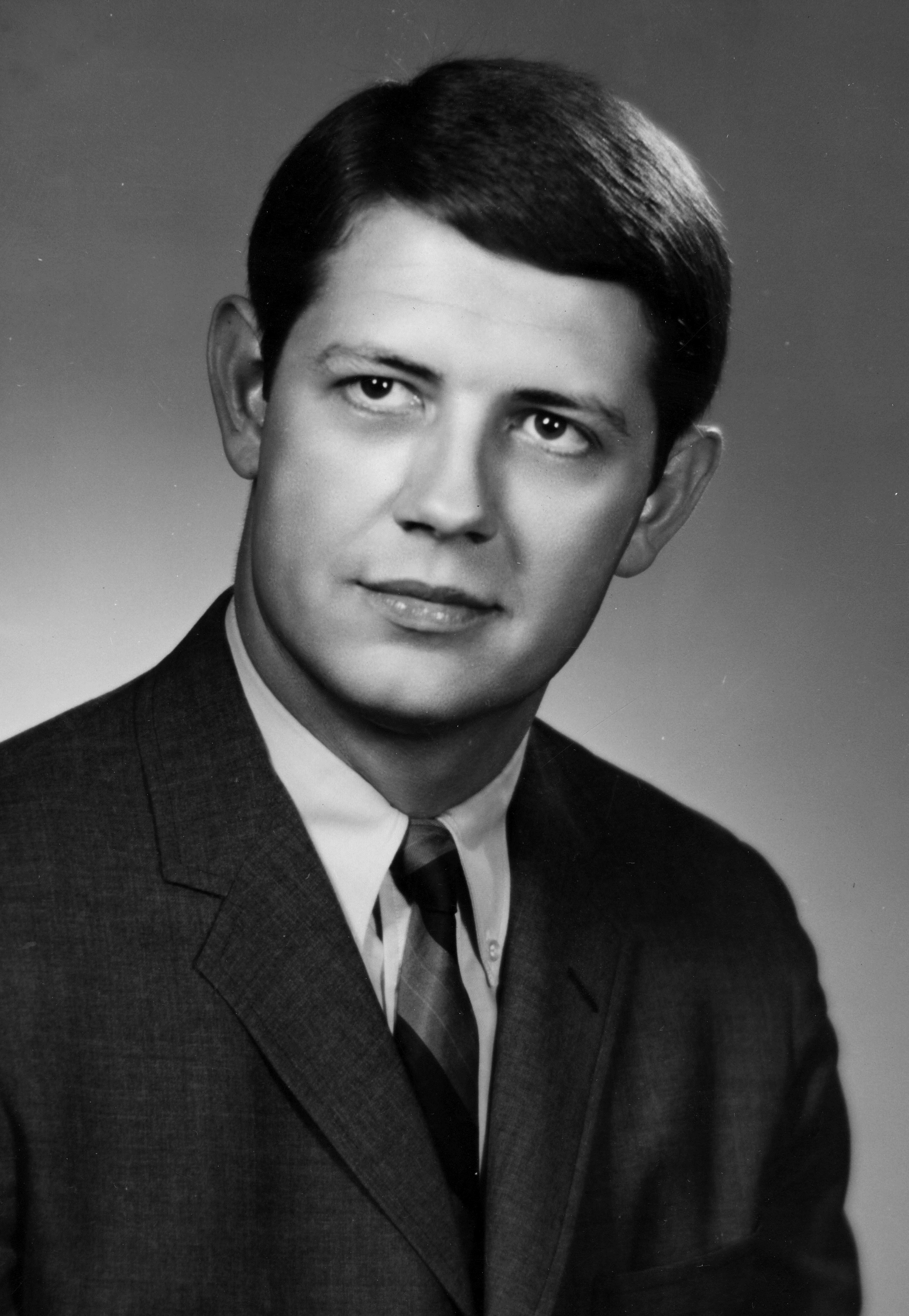

Chairman of the South Carolina Republican Party
- In office 1971–1974
- Preceded by: Raymond A. Harris
- Succeeded by: Dr. George G. Graham

Personal details
- Born: Charles Kenneth Powell; August 11, 1939 Greenwood, South Carolina, U.S.
- Died: October 13, 2019 (aged 80)
- Party: Republican
- Education: Clemson University (BS), University of South Carolina School of Law (JD)
- Occupation: Attorney

C. Kenneth Powell (August 11, 1939 – October 13, 2019) was the chairman of the South Carolina Republican Party from 1971 to 1974.

C. Kenneth Powell was active in the SCGOP, where he first worked on Floyd Spence's 1962 campaign for Congress as a Republican. He ran several times for elective office and became chair of the Richland County Republican Party in 1970. Powell served the S.C. Republican Party as its chair from 1971 to 1974. The election of 1974 was a landmark year for the Party with the victory of James B. Edwards, the first Republican governor of the state since Reconstruction.

Powell died on October 13, 2019, at the age of 80.
