= Ronna McDaniel =

American political strategist (born 1973)

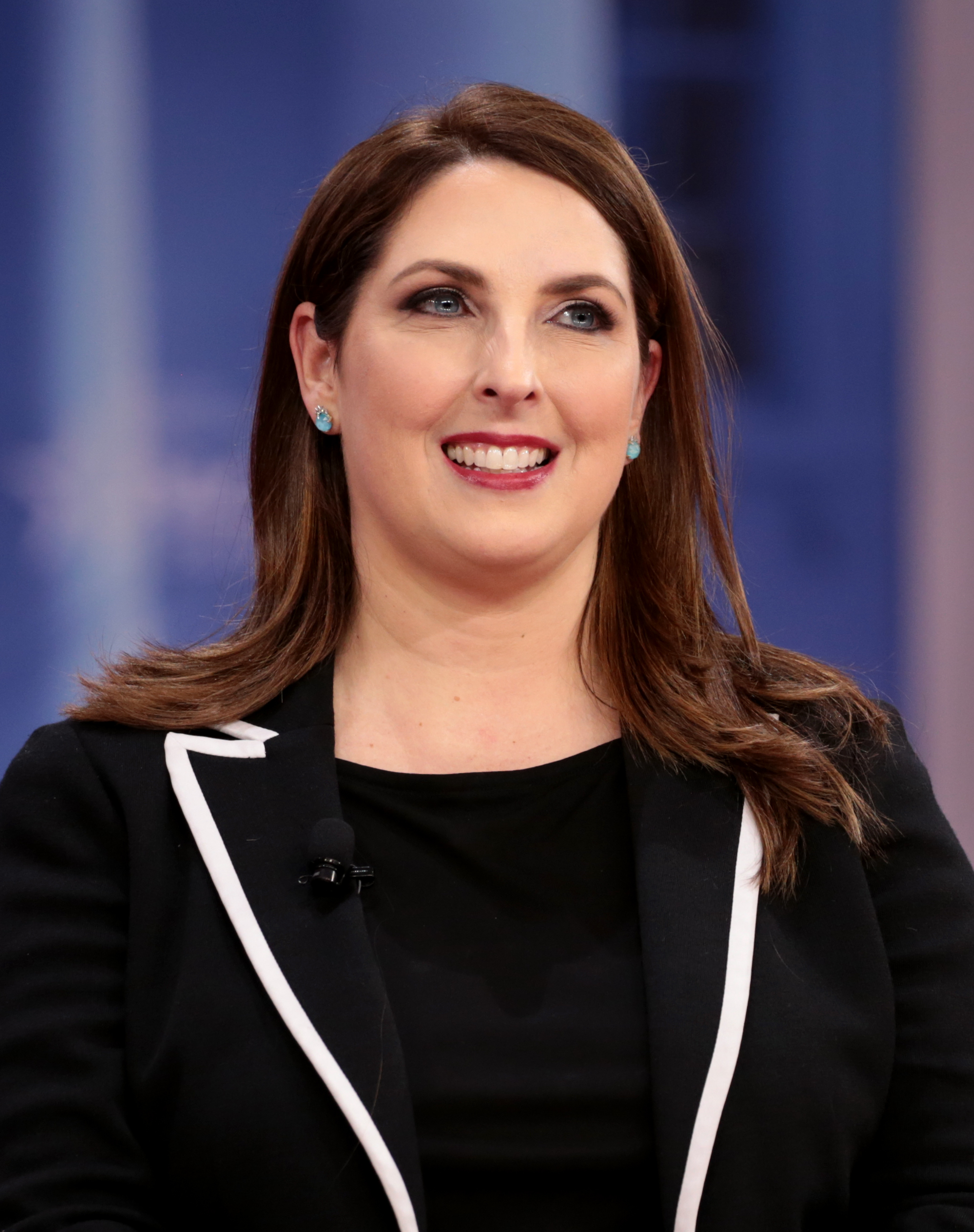
- McDaniel in 2018

65th Chair of the Republican National Committee
- In office January 19, 2017 – March 8, 2024
- Preceded by: Reince Priebus
- Succeeded by: Michael Whatley

Chair of the Michigan Republican Party
- In office February 21, 2015 – January 19, 2017
- Preceded by: Bobby Schostak
- Succeeded by: Ronald Weiser

Personal details
- Born: Ronna Romney; March 20, 1973 (age 53) Austin, Texas, U.S.
- Party: Republican
- Spouse: Patrick McDaniel
- Children: 2
- Relatives: Ronna Romney (mother); Mitt Romney (uncle); See Romney family
- Education: Brigham Young University (BA)

Ronna Romney McDaniel (née Romney; born March 20, 1973) is an American political strategist who served as chair of the Republican National Committee (RNC) from 2017 until her resignation in 2024. A member of the Republican Party and the Romney family, McDaniel was chair of the Michigan Republican Party from 2015 to 2017.

During McDaniel's tenure as chair of the RNC, the Republican Party lost eight governorships, four seats in the United States Senate, 20 seats in the House of Representatives, and the presidency. In December 2022, Axios wrote that McDaniel "has thus far failed to preside over a single positive election cycle."

McDaniel is a granddaughter of Michigan Governor and businessman George W. Romney and a niece of Massachusetts Governor and U.S. Senator Mitt Romney of Utah. She is known for her prolific fundraising and staunch support for former President Donald Trump while RNC chair. Under her leadership, the RNC ran ads for Trump's 2020 campaign as early as 2018, placed numerous Trump campaign workers and affiliates on the RNC payroll, spent considerable funds at Trump-owned properties, covered Trump's legal fees during the Russian interference investigation, hosted the Fake News Awards, and criticized Trump critics within the Republican Party.

McDaniel and the RNC made claims of voter fraud after Joe Biden's 2020 election victory, which Trump refused to concede and attempted to overturn. She directed the RNC to help organize fake electors for Trump at the request of Trump and John Eastman. In 2022, McDaniel orchestrated a censure of Liz Cheney and Adam Kinzinger, two Republicans who were on the House Select Committee on the January 6 Attack. The censure characterized the violent pro-Trump mob as having engaged in "legitimate political discourse".

On February 26, 2024, McDaniel announced her resignation as RNC chair on advice from Donald Trump following his victory in the 2024 South Carolina Republican presidential primary. Her term as chair of the RNC ended March 8. McDaniel served as an NBC News on-air political contributor for less than a week in March 2024.

== Early life and education ==
McDaniel was born Ronna Romney on March 20, 1973, in Austin, Texas. The third of five children born to Ronna Stern Romney and Scott Romney, the older brother of Mitt Romney, McDaniel is a granddaughter of three-term Michigan Governor George W. Romney. Her mother ran for the U.S. Senate in 1996 against Carl Levin, served on the Republican National Committee, and was a delegate to the 1988 Republican National Convention. Romney's grandmother, Lenore Romney, ran for the U.S. Senate in 1970. McDaniel has said her career in politics was inspired by her family.

She attended Lahser High School in Bloomfield Township, Oakland County, Michigan, and earned an undergraduate degree in English from Brigham Young University.

== Career ==
McDaniel worked for SRCP Media as a production manager. She also worked for the production company Mills James as a business manager and as a manager at the staffing firm Ajilon.

McDaniel worked in Michigan for her uncle Mitt's 2012 campaign for President of the United States. She was elected Michigan's representative to the Republican National Committee (RNC) in 2014. In 2015, McDaniel ran to be chair of the Michigan Republican Party, receiving support from both the party establishment and Tea Party activists. At the party's convention in February 2015, she defeated Norm Hughes and Kim Shmina, receiving 55% of the vote in the first ballot. She succeeded Bobby Schostak as chair and stepped down from her position at the RNC.

During the 2016 U.S. presidential election, McDaniel served as a delegate to the 2016 Republican National Convention for Donald Trump. Following the 2016 presidential election, McDaniel became a candidate to chair the Republican National Committee. McDaniel was an early supporter of Donald Trump. McDaniel had activist Wendy Day removed from her party position as grassroots vice-chair due to her refusal to support Trump.

=== RNC chair ===
During McDaniel's tenure as chair of the RNC, the Republican Party had a net loss of seven governorships, three seats in the United States Senate, 19 seats in the House of Representatives, and the presidency. In December 2022, Axios wrote that McDaniel "has thus far failed to preside over a single positive election cycle."

On February 6, 2024, The New York Times reported that McDaniel intended to resign after the South Carolina Republican presidential primary, following dissatisfaction from Trump, who publicly supported North Carolina Republican Party chair Michael Whatley. South Carolina Republican Party chair and Republican National Committee Co-Chair Drew McKissick had also been mentioned as a replacement in several news outlets.

==== Election as chair ====
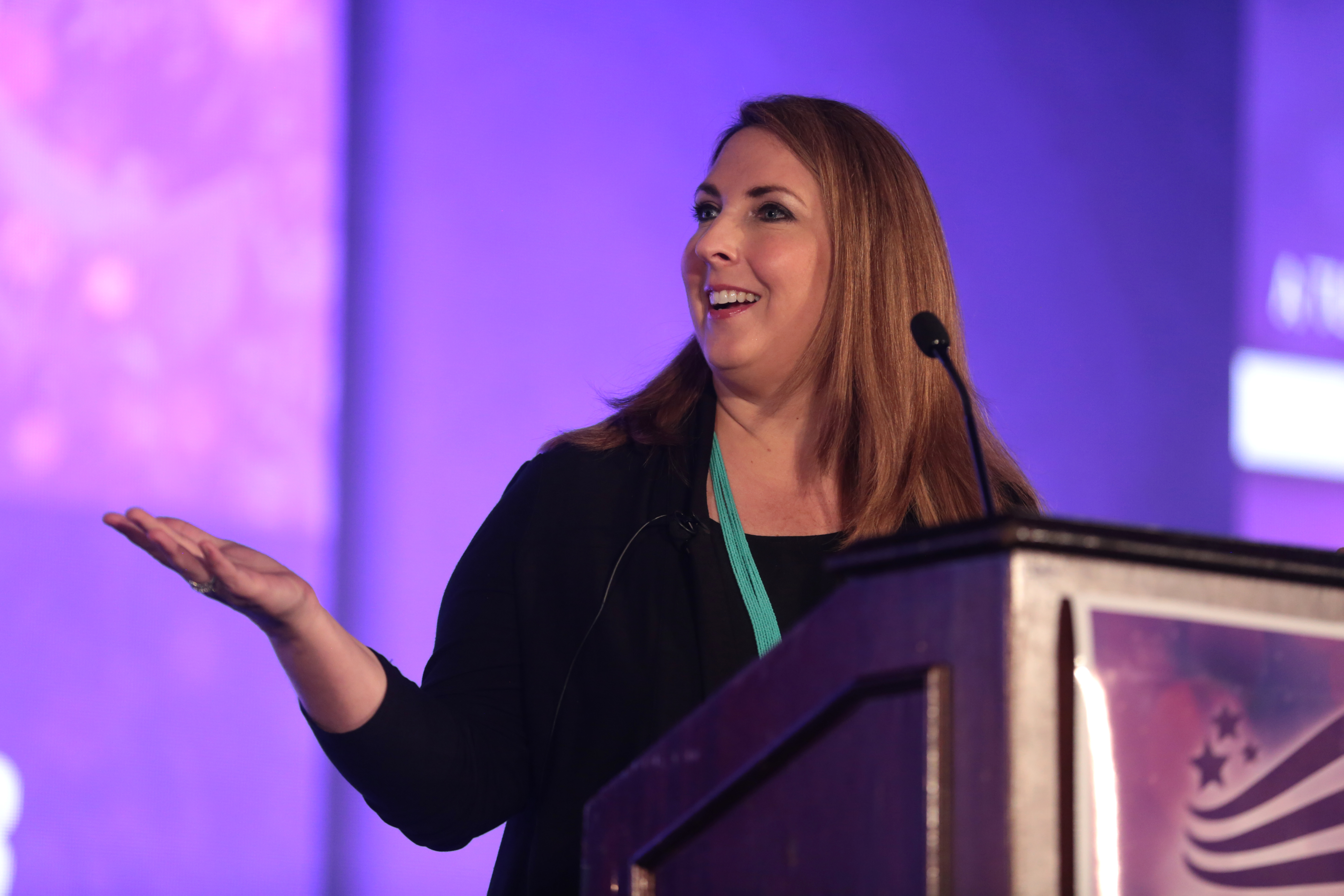
McDaniel at the 2018 Young Women's Leadership Summit

On November 13, 2016, Reince Priebus, chairman of the RNC, was announced as the new White House Chief of Staff, thereby turning the RNC chairman election into an open seat election. Soon afterward, several candidates were reported as likely to seek the position, including McDaniel. On December 14, 2016, McDaniel was chosen by then president-elect Trump as his recommendation to replace Priebus. She served as deputy chair before her formal election. She was officially elected as RNC chair on January 19, 2017, by unanimous vote, becoming the second woman (after Mary Louise Smith) in RNC history to hold the post. According to The Washington Post, Trump requested that she stop using her maiden name, and McDaniel subsequently did not use it in official communications. McDaniel denies that Trump pressured her to change the name.

McDaniel was re-elected as RNC chair in unanimous elections in both 2019 and 2021, with the endorsement of Trump in both elections.

On January 27, 2023, McDaniel was re-elected to stand as the Chair for the RNC going into the 2024 U.S. presidential election, fending off challenges from Harmeet Dhillon and Mike Lindell and winning a fourth term. After her victory, McDaniel stated that she would not seek a fifth term as RNC Chair and further announced she would resign on advice from Donald Trump after he won the 2024 South Carolina Republican presidential primary. She was the longest-serving RNC chair since the Civil War. Her term ended on March 8, 2024.

==== Fundraising efforts ====
In 2018, McDaniel spent up to six hours daily calling donors. Under McDaniel's leadership, the RNC had what The Washington Post described as "a huge financial edge heading into the 2018 midterm elections". As of January 2018, the RNC had almost $40 million banked while the Democratic National Committee had $6.3 million. As of July 17, the Republican National Committee had raised about $213 million for the election cycle with $50.7 million in cash on hand and no debt. In comparison, the Democratic National Committee raised $101 million during the same period. After many white suburban female voters switched to vote for Democrats in the 2018 midterm elections, McDaniel said that the party would engage in a "deep data dive" to learn why.

==== LGBT rights ====
In 2021, McDaniel issued a statement supporting and celebrating LGBT Pride Month, but she did not issue a similar statement in 2022 and 2023 following backlash from social conservatives. McDaniel had also announced the creation of the RNC Pride Coalition in coordination with the Log Cabin Republicans, a group of LGBTQ Republicans. Following the backlash, she apologized for not communicating the initiative prior to the announcement and clarified that the Pride Coalition does not change the GOP's platform on same-sex marriage. McDaniel also said that the initiative was not advocating for any policy issue or change to the platform. She faced calls to resign from some state-level Republican leadership. The RNC dismissed the calls for her to resign.

==== Support for Trump ====
The New York Times described McDaniel as "unfailingly loyal to Trump". According to a 2018 study in The Journal of Politics, under her leadership the RNC has sought to consistently promote Trump and his policies. This includes running ads for Trump's 2020 campaign as early as in 2018, putting a considerable number of Trump campaign workers and affiliates on the RNC payroll, spending considerable funds at Trump-owned properties, covering Trump's legal fees in the Russian interference investigation, hosting Trump's "Fake News Awards", and harshly criticizing Trump critics within the Republican Party. The day after Republican congressman Mark Sanford, known for his criticism of Trump, lost his primary against a pro-Trump candidate, McDaniel tweeted that those who do not embrace Trump's agenda "will be making a mistake". In April 2018, McDaniel praised Trump as a "moral leader".

Politico reported that after Trump endorsed Republican Senate candidate Roy Moore just days before the special Alabama Senate election, the White House influenced McDaniel to resume RNC funding for Moore, who lost in a narrow election to Democrat Doug Jones in December 2017. According to two people close to McDaniel, she privately complained about spending time and money on Moore's behalf. McDaniel was reportedly shocked by Trump's decision to endorse Moore but felt that she had little choice but to follow the president's wishes.

In January 2019, Mitt Romney penned an editorial for The Washington Post criticizing President Trump's moral character. McDaniel said the editorial by her uncle, "an incoming Republican freshman senator", "feeds into what the Democrats and mainstream media want" and was "disappointing and unproductive". In March 2019, McDaniel stated she would not support "the nicest, most moral person in the world" to be president if they were not "aligned with [her] politics".

In May 2019, when House Representative Justin Amash became the first Republican member of Congress to call for Trump's impeachment, citing the evidence of obstruction of justice in the Mueller report, McDaniel criticized Amash, saying he was "parroting the Democrats' talking points on Russia". While she did not explicitly express support for a primary challenge against Amash, she tweeted, "voters in Amash's district strongly support this president".

In September 2020, following the release of audio recordings from February 2020 where President Trump said he was intentionally downplaying the coronavirus, McDaniel defended Trump's handling of the coronavirus. She said, "history will look back on him well as how he handled this pandemic."

By November 2021, the RNC was still covering the legal fees for former president Trump related to investigations into his financial practices in New York.

==== False claims of fraud in the 2020 election ====
By May 2020, the RNC had allocated $20 million to oppose Democratic lawsuits to make voting easier during the coronavirus pandemic, in particular expanding vote-by-mail to states that had not adopted it previously. McDaniel accused Democrats of trying to "destroy" and "assault" the integrity of elections. McDaniel said, "a national vote by mail system would open the door to a new set of problems, such as potential election fraud." According to Deseret News, "Election experts say while voting by mail can be abused, it's rare and inconsequential." In general, research has found no evidence of widespread voter fraud in the United States.

In June 2020, McDaniel shared a RNC video warning about voter fraud in the upcoming 2020 election due to expansions of vote-by-mail related to the coronavirus pandemic. The Washington Post fact-checker wrote that the video "tortures the facts to create a narrative of an election about to be stolen. The illegality being satirized here is a phantom. State election officials, in many cases Republicans, are expanding vote-by-mail as a public health precaution to prevent the risk of spreading the coronavirus — not to rig the outcome."

After Joe Biden won the 2020 election, McDaniel claimed without evidence that there was electoral fraud and voter fraud, and had the RNC promote falsehoods and conspiracy theories about the election. At the same time that she was making claims of fraud, President Trump endorsed her to continue to lead the RNC in the January 2021 RNC chairman election.

In 2022, McDaniel led efforts within the RNC to censure Republican members of Congress Liz Cheney and Adam Kinzinger who had voted to impeach Trump over his incitement of a pro-Trump mob in the U.S. Capitol attack and served on a bipartisan committee to investigate the attack. Within the Republican Party, Cheney had a consistently conservative record, aside from her criticisms of Trump. The censure that McDaniel orchestrated characterized the U.S. Capitol attack as "legitimate political discourse".

==== Campaign donations controversies ====
In October 2017 after Harvey Weinstein, a major donor to the Democratic Party, was accused of sexual abuse, McDaniel said that "returning Weinstein's dirty money should be a no-brainer"; the Democratic Party did give away some of Weinstein's contributions. In January 2018, Steve Wynn resigned as RNC finance chairman after he was accused of sexual misconduct and McDaniel came under pressure to return his donations. McDaniel said that Wynn should be allowed "due process" and that his donations would be returned only after the allegations were investigated by the Wynn Resorts board of directors. In May 2019, it was reported that Wynn had donated nearly $400,000 to the national Republican Party, most of it to the RNC, the previous month. In 2017, Wynn and his wife donated $375,000 to the RNC. As of May 2019, none of the money has been returned by the RNC. Steve Wynn has never been convicted of the allegations.

In September 2019, McDaniel emailed Doug Manchester, whose nomination to become Ambassador to the Bahamas was stalled in the Senate, asking for $500,000 in donations to the Republican Party. Manchester responded, noting that his wife had given $100,000 and that his family would "respond" once he was confirmed by the Republican-led Senate to the ambassadorship. Manchester copied the email to aides of two U.S. senators whose support he needed to win confirmation. CBS News described McDaniel's action as a "possible pay-for-play scheme" for the ambassadorship. The San Diego Union-Tribune reported in May 2021 that a federal grand jury had issued a subpoena in a criminal investigation into Manchester's nomination, apparently focused on the RNC, McDaniel and RNC co-chairman Tommy Hicks, and possibly members of Congress. The Union-Tribune reported the investigation began in 2020.

==== Other controversies ====
Under McDaniel's leadership, the RNC set up a website in April 2018 which attacked and sought to undermine former FBI Director James Comey and called him "Lyin' Comey". McDaniel said Comey was a liar and a leaker, and said that the RNC would "make sure the American people understand why he has no one but himself to blame for his complete lack of credibility".

Politico reported in November 2018 that McDaniel called on the Republican candidate Martha McSally to be more aggressive during the ballot counting process in the Arizona Senate race. The Arizona Senate race remained undecided for several days after election night while all ballots were being accounted in a close contest. McSally held a lead by the end of election night, but her lead narrowed over the next few days, as more ballots were counted. Reportedly, the McSally campaign was being pressured from McDaniel for not being aggressive enough.

On May 13, 2020, ProPublica reported that big RNC contracts were awarded by McDaniel to companies closely connected to her. Contracts went to her husband's company and companies that supported her 2015 run for the chairmanship of the Republican Party in Michigan.

=== Later career ===
On March 22, 2024, NBC News announced that it had hired McDaniel as a contributor. Many of the network's hosts publicly opposed the hiring, due to her statements about the 2020 election, which included instances of undermining journalism and attacks on journalistic integrity. Four days later, NBC reversed its decision and parted ways with McDaniel.

On May 29, 2025, it was announced that McDaniel would serve as CEO of the new DeVos family-backed Michigan Forward Network, which would help elect Republicans in Michigan.

== Personal life ==
A member of the Church of Jesus Christ of Latter-day Saints, she has two children with her husband, Patrick McDaniel. They live in Northville, Michigan.

Party political offices
Preceded by Bobby Schostak	Chair of the Michigan Republican Party; 2015–2017	Succeeded by Ron Weiser
Preceded by Reince Priebus	Chair of the Republican National Committee; 2017–2024	Succeeded by Michael Whatley
