= 2023 Republican National Committee chairmanship election =

American party leadership vote

- January 27, 2023
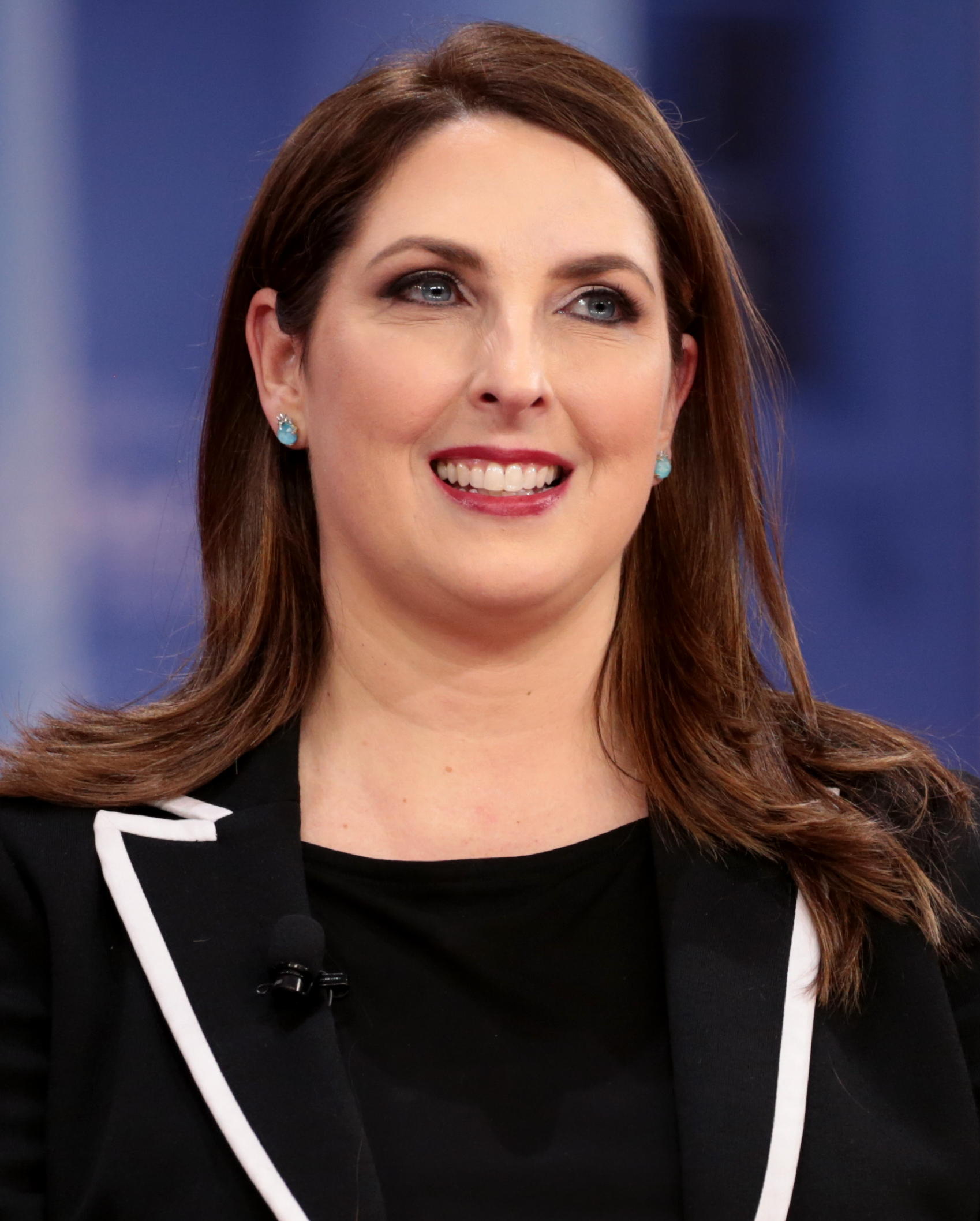

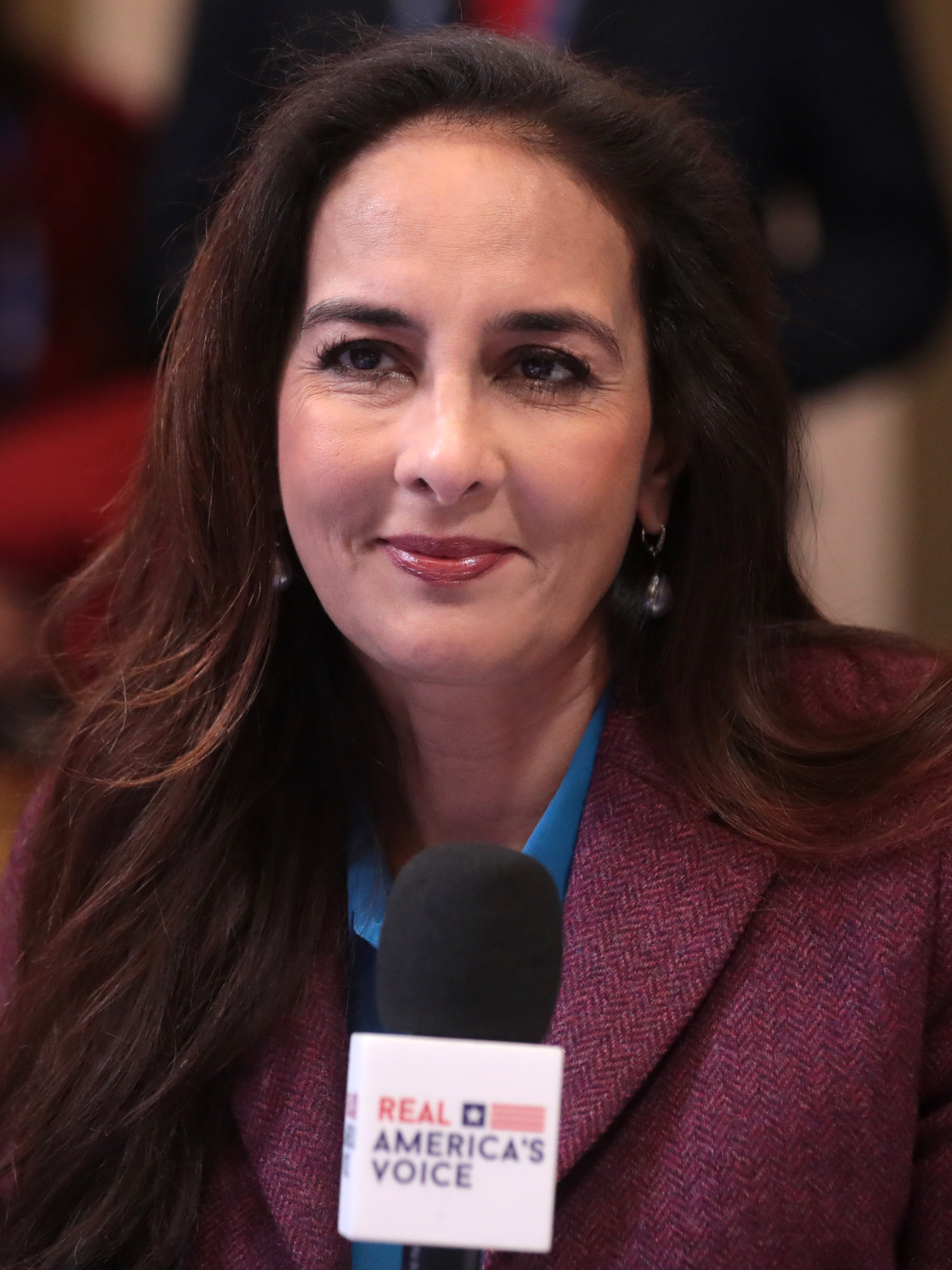

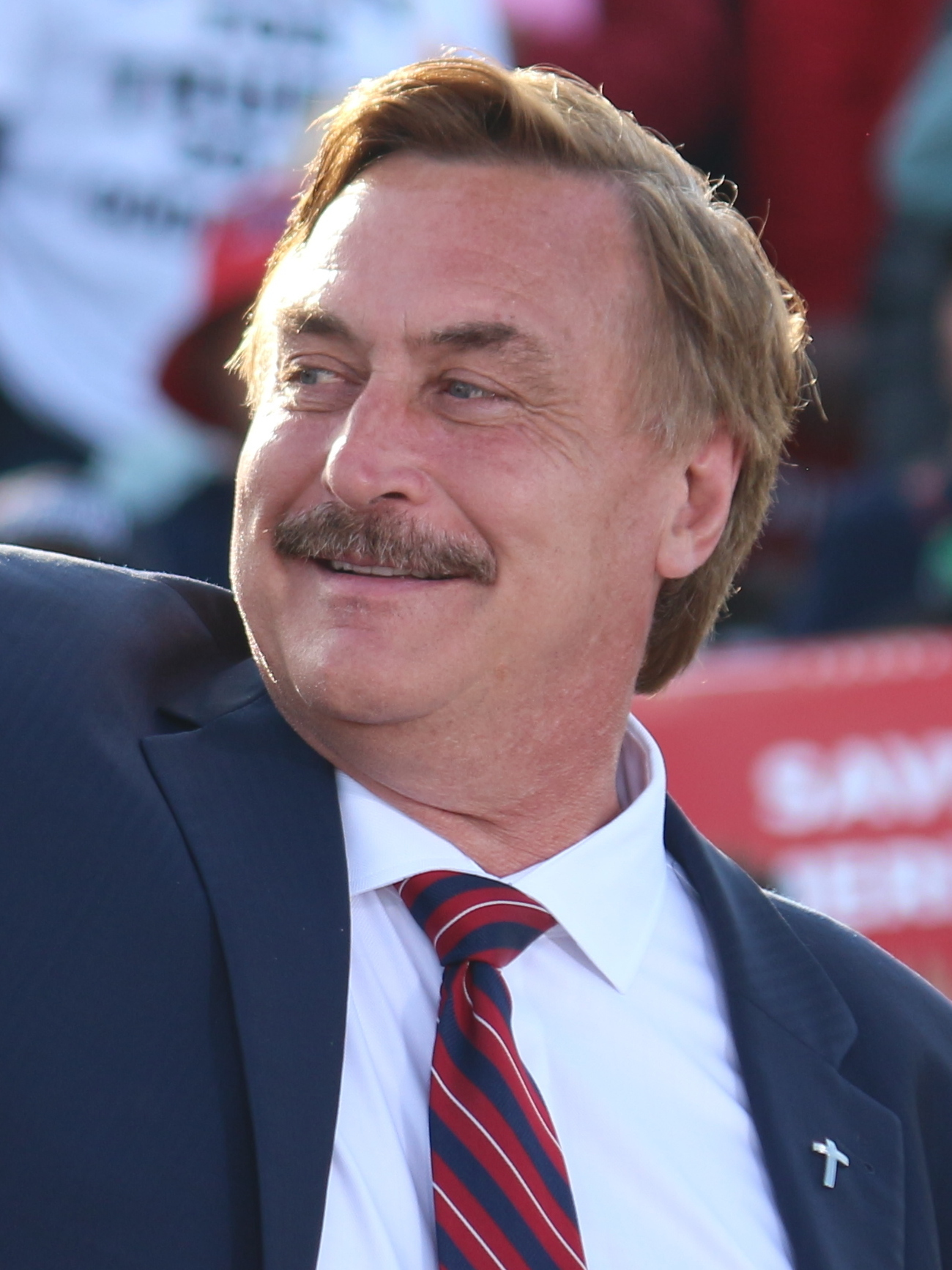

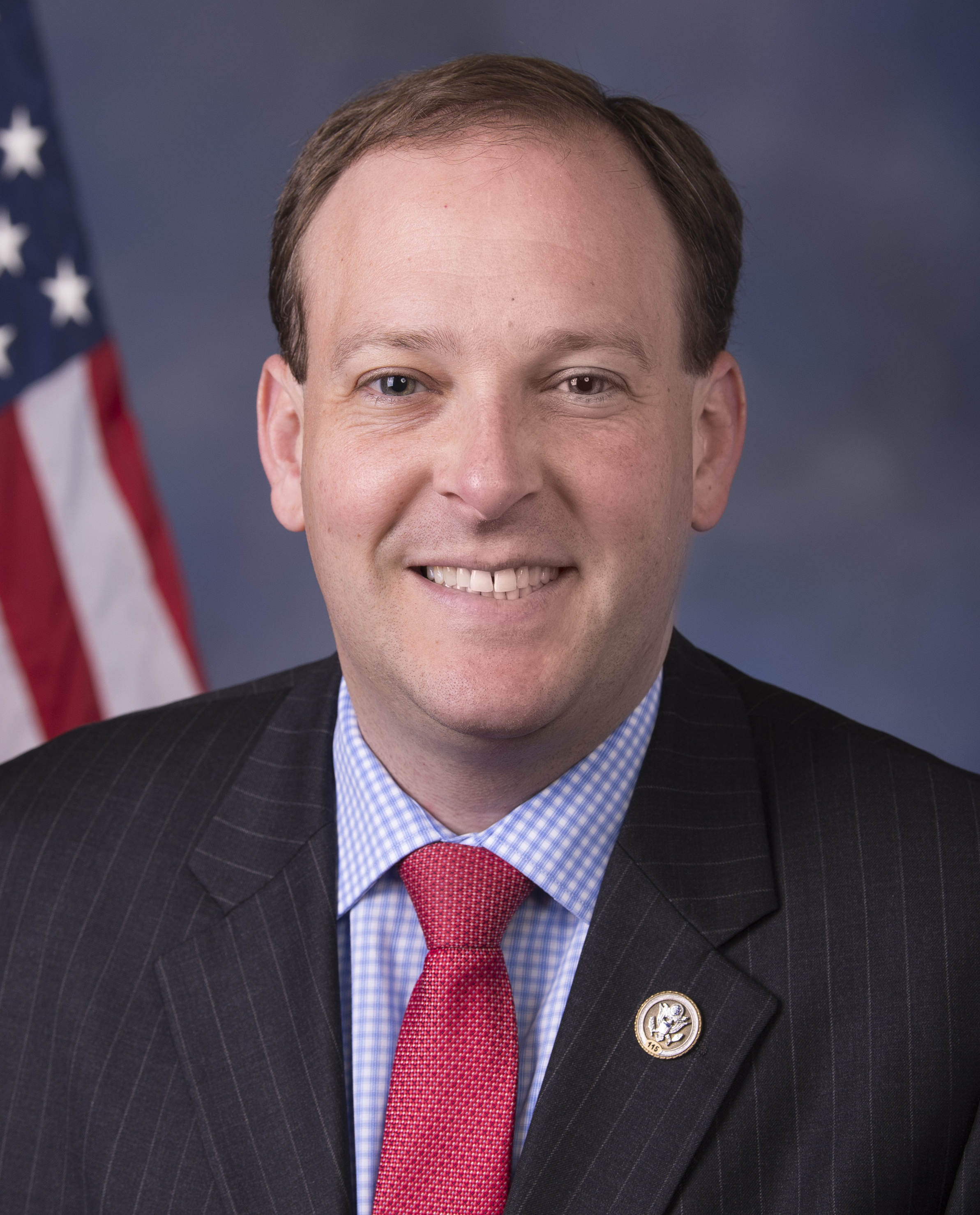
| Candidate | Ronna McDaniel | Harmeet Dhillon |
| Caucus vote | 111 | 51 |
| Percentage | 66.8% | 30.7% |
| Candidate | Mike Lindell | Lee Zeldin (Note: Not formally nominated) |
| Caucus vote | 4 | 1 |
| Percentage | 2.4% | 0.6% |
Chairwoman before election
Ronna McDaniel
Elected Chairwoman
Ronna McDaniel

The 2023 Republican National Committee (RNC) chairmanship election was held on January 27, 2023, in the United States, to determine the next chairman of the Republican National Committee.

Incumbent Chairwoman Ronna McDaniel was reelected to an unprecedented fourth term in office. This was the first chairman election with multiple candidates since 2013.

Under RNC rules, three members from each state and U.S. territory (the state or territory's party chair, one committeeman, and one committeewoman) cast ballots for chair, accounting for 168 votes, of which a majority is 85.

== Campaign ==
During the campaign, it was reported that McDaniel told RNC members that she would be best positioned to prevent Donald Trump from mounting a third party candidacy should he lose the 2024 Republican presidential primary. According to Politico, Dhillon's campaign privately reached out to 'pro-Trump' and 'anti-Trump' factions of the RNC for support.

Trump declined to endorse either McDaniel or Dhillon, and indicated he has a positive opinion of both contenders. Florida governor Ron DeSantis praised Dhillon's campaign, though Dhillon stated that his comments were "not an endorsement."

In January 2023, Dhillon reportedly faced a whisper campaign from McDaniel and supporters of Mike Lindell focusing on her Sikh faith. On January 11, 2023, McDaniel disavowed the attacks, citing her own minority Mormon faith.

== Candidates ==
=== Nominated ===
- Harmeet Dhillon, Civil Rights Attorney, RNC National Committeewoman for California (2016–2025), Chair of National Republican Lawyers Association, and former Vice Chair of the California Republican Party
- Mike Lindell, CEO of My Pillow, Inc., advisor to former president Donald Trump.
- Ronna McDaniel, Chair of the Republican National Committee (2017–2024)

== Results ==
On January 27, 2023, McDaniel was re-elected RNC chair on the first ballot.

| Candidate | Round 1 |
|---|---|
| Ronna McDaniel | 111 |
| Harmeet Dhillon | 51 |
| Mike Lindell | 4 |
| Lee Zeldin | 1 |

Candidate won majority of votes in the round
