= Chad Connelly =

American politician (born 1963)

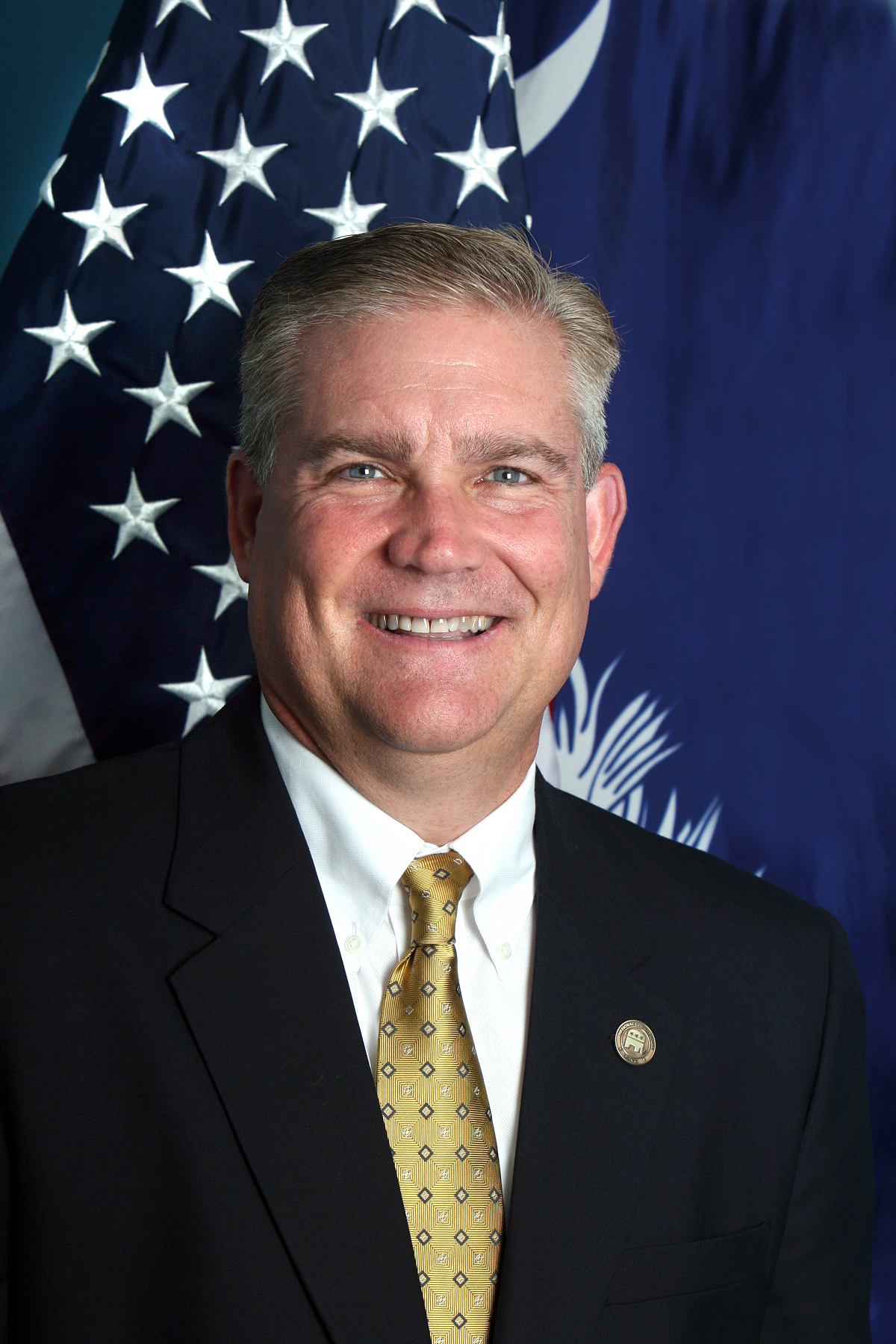
- Official portrait, 2011

Chair of the South Carolina Republican Party
- In office May 7, 2011 – June 8, 2013
- Preceded by: Karen Floyd
- Succeeded by: Matt Moore

Personal details
- Born: Bruce Chadwick Connelly; August 22, 1963 (age 63) Prosperity, South Carolina, U.S.
- Party: Republican
- Spouse: Dana Connelly
- Children: 4
- Education: Clemson University
- Occupation: Self-employed
- Website: Official website

Bruce Chadwick Connelly (born August 22, 1963) is an American politician who served as chairman of the South Carolina Republican Party from May 2011 until June 2013, when he resigned to take a senior role at the Republican National Committee.

In early 2016, he was a candidate for U.S. Representative for South Carolina's 5th congressional district. He came in 4th place out of 7 candidates in the Republican Primary, receiving 5,546 votes or 14.1% out of the 39,270 votes. That election was later won by Ralph Norman.

== Biography ==
=== Early life ===
He graduated from Clemson University, where he earned a degree in civil engineering in 1985.

=== Career ===
He began his career as an engineer but later started his own business.

He was elected chairman on May 7, 2011. He had previously occupied various positions in the party including chairman of the Newberry County Republican Party and delegate to the 2004 Republican National Convention. In the run-up to the 2012 Republican primary season, Connelly argued against an early primary in Florida. Ultimately, South Carolina held its primary on January 21, ten days before the primary in Florida. On May 4, 2013, Connelly was re-elected to a second two-year term.

After his re-election, Reince Priebus tapped him to become the first-ever National Director of Faith Engagement for the RNC. From July 2013 through the 2016 elections, he traveled to 42 states and spoke to over 82,000 pastors, priests, and faith leaders about the importance of their involvement in the public arena. He resigned the RNC position in Fall 2017 to go back to run his own ministry organization, Faith Wins.

He is the author of Freedom Tide (ISBN 978-0937539682), a book about the Christian heritage of the nation.

He is the founder and president of the Faith Wins, a Christian-based 501 c3 organization dedicated to educating and mobilizing pastors and faith leaders to become involved in the public arena and insure that their congregations vote Biblical values. He was a frequent speaker at Tea Party events. He is a regular commentator on Fox News Channel, MSNBC, CNN, CNBC, and NPR as well as many other outlets in the United States. He serves on the board of the Palmetto Family Council and the South Carolina Citizens for Life.

=== Personal life ===
He lives in Prosperity, South Carolina with his wife Dana and their four children. His previous wife of 18 years, Michelle, committed suicide in 2006. His faith wavered when he found her “in a pool of blood” but friends supported him and introduced him to a widow.

Party political offices
Preceded by Karen Floyd	Chairmen of the South Carolina Republican Party; 2011–2013	Succeeded by Matt Moore
