= Gregory D. Shorey Jr. =

American politician (1924–2026)

Chair of the South Carolina Republican Party
- In office 1958–1961
- Preceded by: David Dows
- Succeeded by: Robert F. Chapman

Personal details
- Born: June 27, 1924 Belmont, Massachusetts, U.S.
- Died: May 18, 2026 (aged 101)
- Party: Republican
- Spouse: Betty Jane Young (m. 1946; died 2012)
- Children: 2
- Education: Boston University

Military service
- Branch/service: United States Navy
- Years of service: 1943–1945
- Battles/wars: World War II

Gregory Day Shorey Jr. (June 27, 1924 – May 18, 2026) was an American politician and civic leader who served as chair of the South Carolina Republican Party from 1958 to 1961.

== Early life ==
Gregory Day Shorey was born in Belmont, Massachusetts, on June 27, 1924, to Gregory Day and Lucille McNamara. He attended school at Boston University. During World War II, he joined the United States Navy, serving from 1943 to 1945. While at Boston University, Shorey served as president of Young Republicans from 1947 to 1948. In 1950, he moved to Greenville, South Carolina.

== Political career ==
In 1952, Shorey was a leader of the South Carolinians for Eisenhower in Greenville County. Shorey was chairman of the Greenville County Republican Party from 1952 to 1954. He was a delegate to the 1956, 1960, and 1964 Republican National Conventions. Shorey gave the seconding speech for Barry Goldwater at the 1960 Republican National Convention.

== Personal life and death ==
Shorey married his wife, Betty Jane Young, on March 3, 1946. Betty died on May 17, 2012, at the age of 86. He had a daughter, Pamela Grace, and a son, Gregory D. Shorey III. In 1978, he was awarded the Order of the Palmetto.

Shorey died on May 18, 2026, at the age of 101.
