= Thomas O. Hicks Jr. =

American investor

Tommy O. Hicks Jr.

Chairman of America First Policies
- Incumbent
- Assumed office January 27, 2017

Member of the President's Intelligence Advisory Board
- Incumbent
- Assumed office February 11, 2025
- Preceded by: Various

Co-Chair of the Republican National Committee
- In office February, 2019 – January 28, 2023
- Leader: Ronna McDaniel
- Preceded by: Bob Paduchik
- Succeeded by: Drew McKissick

Personal details
- Born: Thomas O. Hicks Jr.

Thomas O. Hicks Jr. is an American private equity investor living in Dallas, Texas. He is a former co-chair of the Republican National Committee.

== Education and career ==
Hicks graduated from the University of Texas at Austin in 2001.

Hicks is a Partner of Hicks Holdings, LLC and a Founding Partner of Scout SSG, LLC. He serves as a Director for Resolute Energy Corporation. He has served on the board of directors for Carol's Daughters Holdings and Berkshire Resources, LLC.

== Political career ==
Hicks is Chairman of America First Policies and previously served as National Finance Co-Chairman for Donald J. Trump for President. Hicks served with Donald Trump Jr. on the America First Super PAC with a reception honoring senior White House appointees and top Ambassadors supporting President Trump. He served as a co-chair of the Republican National Committee, succeeded by Drew McKissick.

=== Allegations of awareness of Trump's Ukraine Pressure Campaign ===
The New York Times reported on January 15, 2020, that Lev Parnas stated that he "communicated regularly" with Hicks and Joseph Ahearn, another Republican fund-raiser, about his (Parnas's) activities as part of Trump's "effort to win political advantage".

== Personal life ==
Hicks and his wife have three children. He is the son of Thomas Ollis Hicks, Sr.

In 2010, Hicks resigned from the board of Liverpool Football Club after telling a fan to "blow me fuck face" in a heated email exchange over the club's transfer budget.

== See also ==
- Lev Parnas and Igor Fruman
