= Raymond A. Harris =

American politician

Raymond Alexander Harris

Chairman of the South Carolina Republican Party
- In office 1968–1971
- Preceded by: Harry S. Dent, Sr.
- Succeeded by: C. Kenneth Powell

Personal details
- Born: February 3, 1927 Forestville, North Carolina
- Died: May 30, 2016 (aged 89) Darlington, South Carolina
- Spouse: Vi Harris
- Education: Wake Forest University
- Occupation: Real estate

Raymond A. Harris (February 3, 1927 – May 30, 2016) was the chairman of the South Carolina Republican Party from 1968–1971.

Serving in WW2 in the Naval Air Corps, Ray graduated from Wake Forest in 1950 with a Bachelor of Arts.

From 1965 to 1968, he was the Executive Director of the South Carolina Republican Party under SCGOP Chairman Harry S. Dent, Sr.; He was State Chairman of the SC Republican Party from 1968–1971; Delegate from South Carolina to the Republican national Convention 1976 in Kansas City, KS; Member, Republican national Committee from SC 1976–1980.

In 1974 he was appointed to the national Corp. of Housing Partnerships from President Nixon. In 1984 he was appointed Regional Administrator of HUD Region IV Atlanta, GA by HUD Secretary, Sam Pierce and reappointed in 1987 by then Secretary of HUD Jack Kemp.

In 1991 President Bush conferred the Rank of Meritorious Executive, Senior Executive Service, "For Sustained accomplishments in Managing HUD Programs" in the 8 southeastern states, including Puerto Rico.

He was the Director, Darlington County Economic Development from 1996–2003.
