= George G. Graham =

American politician

Chairman of the South Carolina Republican Party
- In office May 1980 – May 1986
- Preceded by: Daniel I. Ross, Jr.
- Succeeded by: Van Hipp, Jr.

Personal details
- Born: September 23, 1931 (age 94) Spartanburg, South Carolina, U.S.
- Party: Republican
- Spouse: Eudora Graham

George G. Graham (born September 23, 1931) is an American politician who served as chairman of the South Carolina Republican Party from 1980 to 1986.
