= South Carolina Republican Party =

South Carolina affiliate of the Republican Party

- Abbreviation: SCGOP
- Chairperson: Drew McKissick
- Founder: Robert Smalls
- Founded: 1867
- Headquarters: Columbia, South Carolina
- Ideology: Conservatism
- National affiliation: Republican Party
- Colors: Red
- Seats in the U.S. Senate: 2 / 2
- Seats in the U.S. House of Representatives: 6 / 7
- Statewide Executive Offices: 8 / 9
- Seats in the South Carolina Senate: 34 / 46
- Seats in the South Carolina House of Representatives: 88 / 124

Election symbol

Website
- www.sc.gop

The South Carolina Republican Party (SCGOP) is the state affiliate of the national Republican Party in South Carolina. It is one of two major political parties in the state, along with the South Carolina Democratic Party, and is the dominant party. Incumbent governor Henry McMaster, as well as senator Tim Scott are members of the Republican party. Tim Scott was appointed in 2013 by then-governor Nikki Haley, who is also a Republican.

Since 2003, every governor of South Carolina has been a Republican. Additionally, Republicans hold a super-majority in both chambers of the South Carolina General Assembly. In 2020, District 1, which was represented by Democrat Joe Cunningham, was won by Republican Nancy Mace; the party now represents six out of seven of the state's congressional districts.

== History ==
=== 19th century ===
In 1868, legislation prohibiting racial discrimination in public accommodations was passed by the state house, but failed in the state senate. Benjamin F. Randolph, a state legislator and chair of the party, and another legislator were murdered that year.

The Republican Party of the United States was founded during the 1850s in response to the political tensions that revolved around slavery and came to define that era. The Republican Party's goal was to abolish slavery and preserve the hierarchy of the national government over that of the states. The ensuing years were marked by an increasing divide between northern and southern states that eventually boiled over when the state of South Carolina seceded from the Union in 1860. Other southern states followed and the American Civil War began in 1861 between the Union and the newly minted Confederacy. In 1865, the conflict ended with the Union as the victor. Following this, the southern and formerly Confederate states were gradually reintroduced back into the Union of the United States with a process that came to be called the Reconstruction Era of the United States. Northern Republicans and freed slaves came to control the politics of South Carolina during this era, as Confederates were temporarily disenfranchised. The planter elite struggled to adapt to a free labor system. The Republican Party of South Carolina was established during this time and controlled the politics of South Carolina throughout Reconstruction. Democrats mounted increasing violence and fraud at elections from 1868 through the period, in an effort to suppress the black and Republican vote. In 1874, the paramilitary Red Shirts arose as a paramilitary group working openly to disrupt Republican meetings, suppress black voting and return Democrats to power. The most violence occurred in counties where blacks were a strong minority, as Democrats tried to reduce their challenge.

White Democrats led by Wade Hampton won the governorship and control of the state legislature in 1876. They dominated the state government for decades, controlling most candidates for governor and for national office. Freedmen were still able to elect Republicans to local office in some counties, giving them a say in daily government.

Following a brief coalition between the Republican Party and Populists in the late 19th century, the South Carolina legislature followed others in the South in passing a constitution to disenfranchise most blacks and many poor whites. The Constitution of 1895 was a departure from the Reconstruction Constitution of 1868 that aimed to keep the majority black population from voting. However, the poll tax, property requirements and literacy requirements also keep poor whites from voting. By excluding blacks from politics, the Democrats secured their power and ended the Republican challenge. The legislatures passed such laws and constitutions from 1890 to 1908, turning most of the South into a one-party region dominated by Democrats. The Solid South disenfranchised large portions of its states' populations. The exclusion of freedmen and their descendants from the political system resulted in the South Carolina Republican Party with very little influence within the state for generations after. This control would last until the second half of the twentieth century.

=== 20th century ===
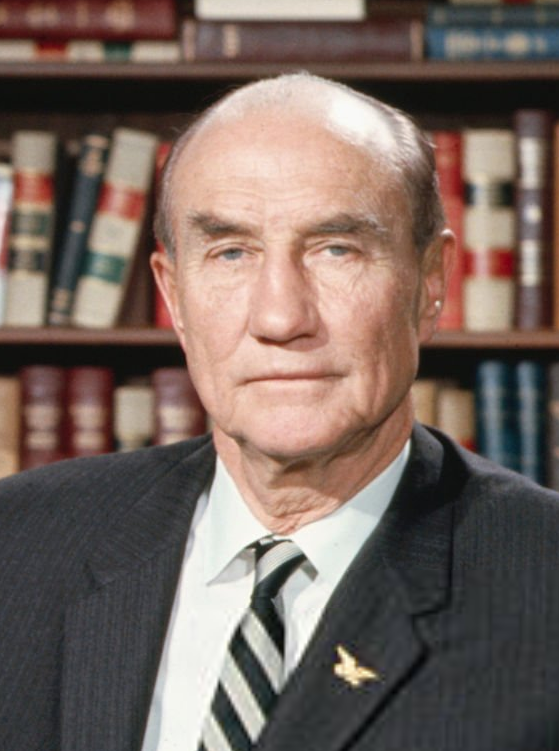
Senator Strom Thurmond (1967)

During the 1950s and into the 1970s, in the heat of the Civil Rights Movement, the Party gained momentum, partly due to major shifts in the demographics and policies of the nation's two largest parties and the GOP's "southern strategy" spearheaded by President Richard Nixon and his advisors. On September 16, 1964, Senator Strom Thurmond, a major player in South Carolina politics, announced he had switched parties from the Democratic to the Republican Party, saying the Democratic "party of our fathers is dead." He argued it had "forsaken the people to become the party of minority groups, power-hungry union leaders, political bosses, and businessmen looking for government contracts and favors".

In the 1952 United States presidential election, the Party supported an independent slate of electors for the Eisenhower–Nixon ticket, in an effort to avoid vote dilution that would aid Adlai Stevenson II, the Democratic nominee. This led to the unusual outcome of no Republican electors from the state. Eisenhower narrowly lost the state in the general election, winning 49.28% of the vote. Afterwards, as South Carolina Republicans attempted to grow the Party's footprint in the state, multiple factions competed for support from the national party. In 1953, Party chairman D.F. Merrill sued a group of rival Republicans that received the financial support of the national GOP, prohibiting the group from calling itself the "Republican Party".

In 1967, Carolyn Frederick was elected to represent House District 22 in Greenville County, becoming the first woman to be elected to the chamber.

==== Emergence of the Southern Strategy ====
During the 1968 United States presidential election, the Party was accused of trying to undermine support for third-party candidate George Wallace by feeding the Wallace campaign bad advice regarding his efforts to win the state.

Following Nixon's win in 1968, the Party Chairman, Harry Dent, left to work in Nixon's Administration. Dent is credited as the architect of the Southern Strategy. In advance of the 1972 United States presidential election, Dent lobbied to move the Party towards a moderate position that would attract a broad base of voters, including the state's large black population in the wake of desegregation in the United States and growing support for civil rights and equality under the law. This was in opposition to the efforts of the state's more segregationist operatives, like Thurmond and Barry Goldwater, who supported a staunchly conservative and anti-integration position for the Party that was untethered from the moderation sought by Northeastern Republicans.

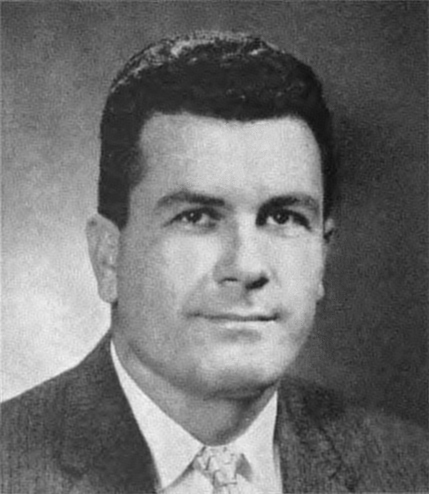
Congressman Watson in 1965

In 1970, Congressman Albert Watson made the first well-financed run for governor by a Republican since the Reconstruction era governorship of Daniel Chamberlain. Initially a Democrat, he believed Southern Democrats to be "the golden strain of true conservatism and economy in government." After facing marginalization for his support of Goldwater and Nixon, he resigned his congressional seat and ran as a Republican in a 1965 special election, and eventually defeated his Democratic opponent who support compliance with the Civil Rights Act of 1964. In his race, Watson embodied the anti-integration sentiment growing within the Republican Party, contrasting himself from his pro-integration and racially avoidant Democratic opponent, John Carl West.

During the 1972 elections, in keeping with the Southern Strategy, South Carolina Republicans undertook an unprecedented challenge to Democratic control in the state, including running candidates for all six of the state's congressional seats for the first time. The South Carolina Republican Party, led by chairman Kenneth Powell, breached a status quo between local conservative Democrats and the Nixon campaign in which the Democrats' support of Nixon and Thurmond was rewarded with Republicans forgoing electoral challenges. The 1972 election resulted in the resurgence of the Republican Party as a competitive political force in the South, with Nixon winning many southern states, including South Carolina.

In 1974, James B. Edwards propelled the momentum gained in 1972 by becoming the first Republican to be elected the governor of South Carolina since Reconstruction. Edwards played a unique role in the Party's history, breaking the tradition of separation between the governor and party politics in order to increase the Party's influence in the national Republican Party. He supported Ronald Reagan over Gerald Ford and Nelson Rockefeller in the 1976 Republican Party presidential primaries. Reagan would go on to win 23 of the state's 36 delegates at the state convention.

=== 21st-century rise to dominance ===
The Party held its first presidential preference primary for the 1980 presidential election, allowing voters to directly choose who the state's delegates would support at the national convention. In an effort to court Democratic voters disgruntled with the leftward shift of the national Democratic party, the primary was made open to all voters. By the 1990s, the Party had firm control over the governorship, except in 1998 when incumbent Republican David Beasley lost re-election, partly due to his opposition to gambling in the state. The Federal Election Commission fined the Party $60,000 for violations connected to its funding of Beasley's re-election campaign. Republicans retook the governorship in 2004, and have held it ever since.

Shortly after the turn of the century, the Party solidified its control over the state's government and congressional delegation. Republicans first gained a majority in the state Senate in 2002, and have maintained it ever since. Even still, elections in 2002 were close, and the Party worked closely with the Bush Adminisration to increase GOP support in that year's races.

Some scholars and journalists argue the rise in migration from northern states in the 1990s and the 2000s led to slight moderation among the state's Republicans, particularly on issues like environmental conservation along the state's coast and gun control.

In 2010, Republican Mick Mulvaney was elected as the representative of South Carolina's 5th congressional district, the first Republican to represent that district since Robert Smalls, the party's co-founder, last held the seat in 1883. The election of Mulvaney was the first break in 100+ years of Democratic control of the state's congressional delegation. Also in 2010, Republican Nikki Haley was elected the first female governor of South Carolina and the second Indian-American, after fellow Republican Bobby Jindal, to serve as a governor in the United States.

South Carolina's 2012 Republican Presidential Preference Primary was the party's then-largest ever, drawing more than 600,000 voters. Newt Gingrich won the race with 40.4% of the vote. The highly contested election set multiple state records for a presidential primary cycle; candidates held five presidential debates and spent $13.2 million in television ads. Governor Haley appointed Republic Tim Scott to the U.S. Senate. Scott is the first African-American senator from South Carolina and the first from the South since 1881.

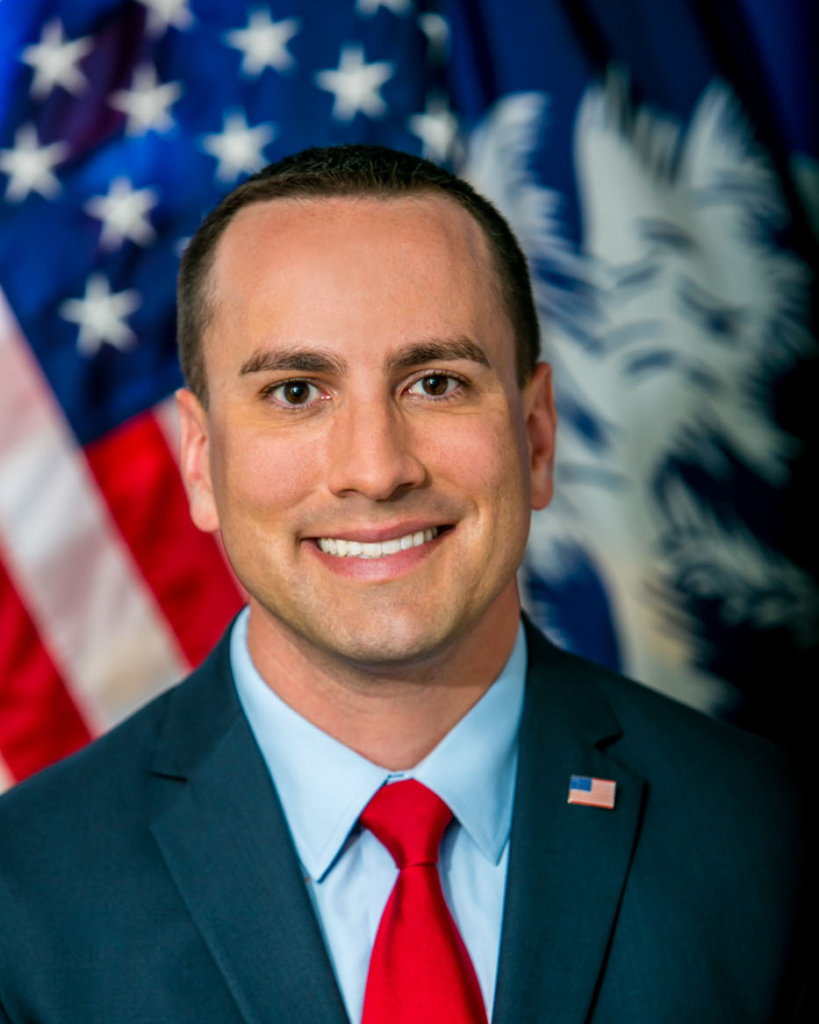
Former state Party chairman Matt Moore

By 2014, the Party held nearly all of the state's state-wide and federal offices, but saw less dominance on the local and county level, where Democrats remained competitive in races for sherriff, coroner, and auditor. Party Chairman Matt Moore launched a concerted effort in the 2014 elections to expand Republican control of these offices.

After Donald Trump launched his campaign for the presidency in 2015, the South Carolina Republican Party's leaders appeared skeptical of the candidate. In April 2016, then-Chairman Matt Moore said, "the proof will be in the pudding" in reference to Trump's ability to win the support of the Party's leaders after his criticism of the nomination process. He added, "Trump has attacked the party and Reince [Priebus]. I'd like to see that significantly decrease. If he is the nominee, we'll work hand in hand with him." The state's 2016 Republican Presidential Preference Primary saw a new turnout record of over 740,000 voters. Donald Trump won the primary with 32.5% of the vote, beating 13 other challengers.

As President Donald Trump faced no significant primary opposition in the 2020 United States presidential election, the Party cancelled the state's presidential preference primary that year. This move was challenged in court, but upheld by a circuit court judge as consistent with state law.

In the 2024 Republican primary election, President Trump received the most votes in the history of the state Party's history. Nikki Haley, the state's former governor and Trump's former United Nations ambassador, came in second with 39.52% of the vote.

In the 2024 general election, the Party gained a supermajority in the state Senate for the first time in 150 years. With its supermajority in the state House gained in the 2022 general election, the legislative Republicans maintained a veto-proof majority that could also overcome Democratic filibusters in the Senate.

Political historians have noted the Party's ability to reflect and absorb the growth of the state's migratory population, while still maintaining dominance in the political system.

== History of the Republican presidential primary ==
The South Carolina Republican primary has been known as the "first in the South" primary that clears the early field of candidates following the traditional first primaries in Iowa and New Hampshire. In 2024, party Chairman McKissick said South Carolina has a "tradition of being the graveyard of presidential campaigns." Due to the mix of suburban and rural voters in the state, candidates must demonstrate their ability to generate support among a Republican base similar to the national Republican base.

The party protects this designation, expressing disapproval when other states schedule primaries too close to South Carolina's, like when North Carolina held its 2012 primary a week after South Carolina. In 2007, then-chairman Katon Dawson said, "We will be the first in the south. It's a historic position we've had, and we will protect it." In January 2026, the Republican National Committee voted to maintain South Carolina's position as the first southern primary for the 2028 primary.

Since 1980, and with the exception of the 2012 primary, the presidential candidate that won the South Carolina Republican primary also won the national party's nomination. This has given the state, and by extension its Republican Party, an outsized role in national politics.

Primary year	South Carolina primary winner	Republican Party's nominee
1980	Ronald Reagan	Ronald Reagan
1984	Ronald Reagan	Ronald Reagan
1988	George H.W. Bush	George H.W. Bush
1992	George H.W. Bush	George H.W. Bush
1996	Bob Dole	Bob Dole
2000	George W. Bush	George W. Bush
2004	N/A	George W. Bush
2008	John McCain	John McCain
2012	Newt Gingrich	Mitt Romney
2016	Donald Trump	Donald Trump
2020	N/A	Donald Trump
2024	Donald Trump	Donald Trump

== Party leadership ==
The party is led by an elected group of state party officers, the South Carolina Republican Party State Executive Committee and paid staff. The state party organization is headquartered in Columbia, South Carolina.

Current party officers of the South Carolina Republican Party
Office	Member
Chairman	Drew McKissick
National Committeewoman	Cindy Costa
National Committeeman	Tyson Grinstead
First Vice Chairman	Cindy Risher
Second Vice Chairman	Leon Winn
Third Vice Chairman	Christen Norman
Treasurer and Comptroller	Sharon Thomson
Recording Secretary	Cindy Risher
Parliamentarian	Nate Leupp
Executive Director	Leighton Gray
First Congressional District Chairman	Cynthia Jones
Second Congressional District Chairman	Craig Caldwell
Third Congressional District Chairman	Susan Aiken
Fourth Congressional District Chairman	Beverly Owensby
Fifth Congressional District Chairman	Freddie Gault
Sixth Congressional District Chairman	Sandra Bryan
Seventh Congressional District Chairman	Jerry Rovner
South Carolina Teenage Republicans Chairman	Patton Byars
South Carolina College Republicans Chairman	Emma Scott
South Carolina Federation of Republican Women President	Beverly Owensby
South Carolina Young Republicans Chairman	Sarah Jane Walker

== Current elected officials ==
The South Carolina Republican Party controls eight out of nine statewide offices and holds large majorities in both chambers of the South Carolina General Assembly. Republicans also hold one of the state's U.S. Senate seats and six of the state's seven U.S. House of Representatives seats.

In 2012, Republican Tom Rice became the representative of South Carolina's 7th congressional district, newly re-established because of population gains. He is the first person to represent that district since it was eliminated in 1933.

In a 2013 special election, former Republican Governor Mark Sanford was elected as the representative of South Carolina's 1st congressional district, returning to the seat he previously held from 1995 to 2001.

=== Members of Congress ===
==== U.S. Senate ====
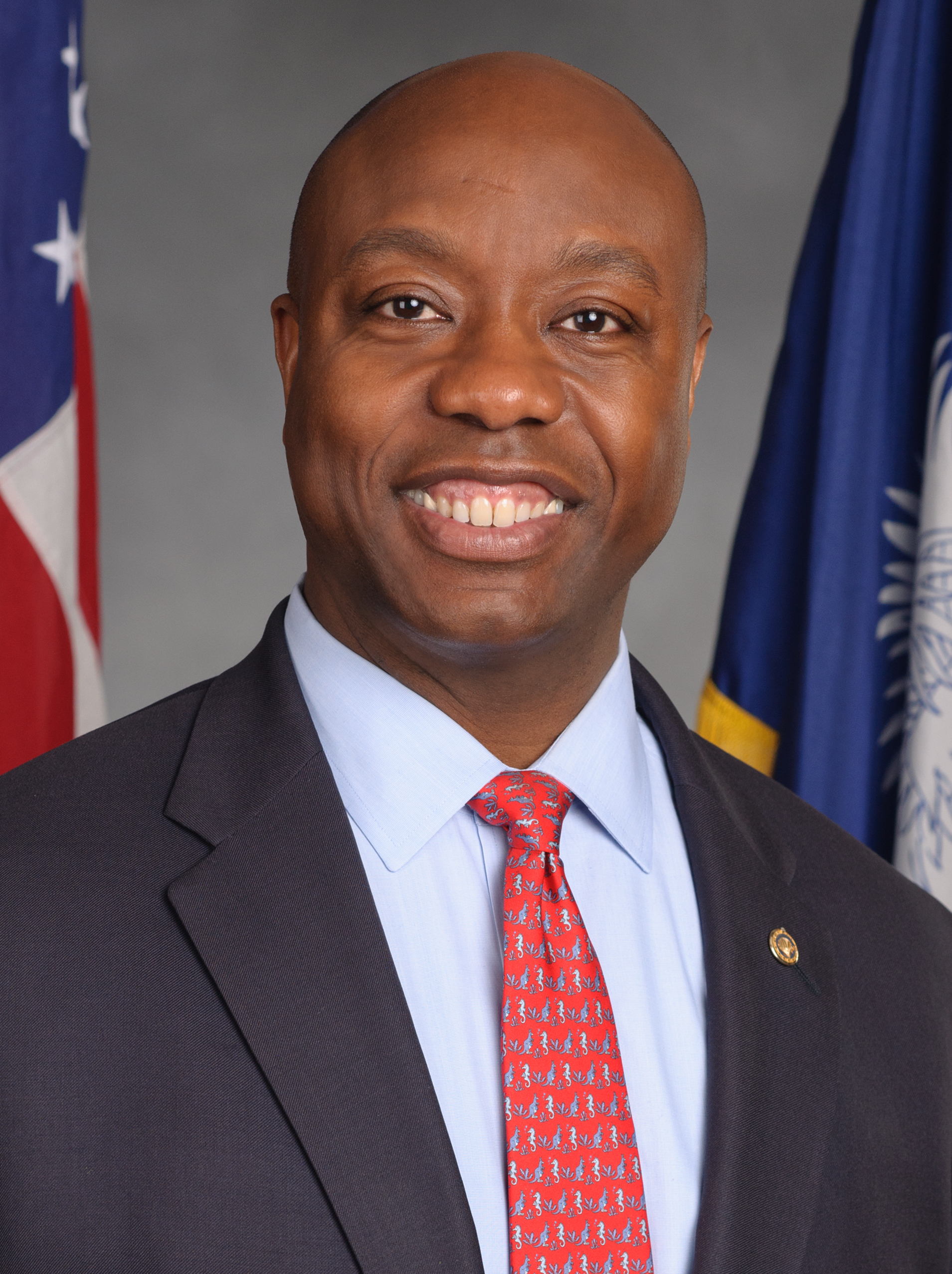
Senior U.S. Senator Tim Scott
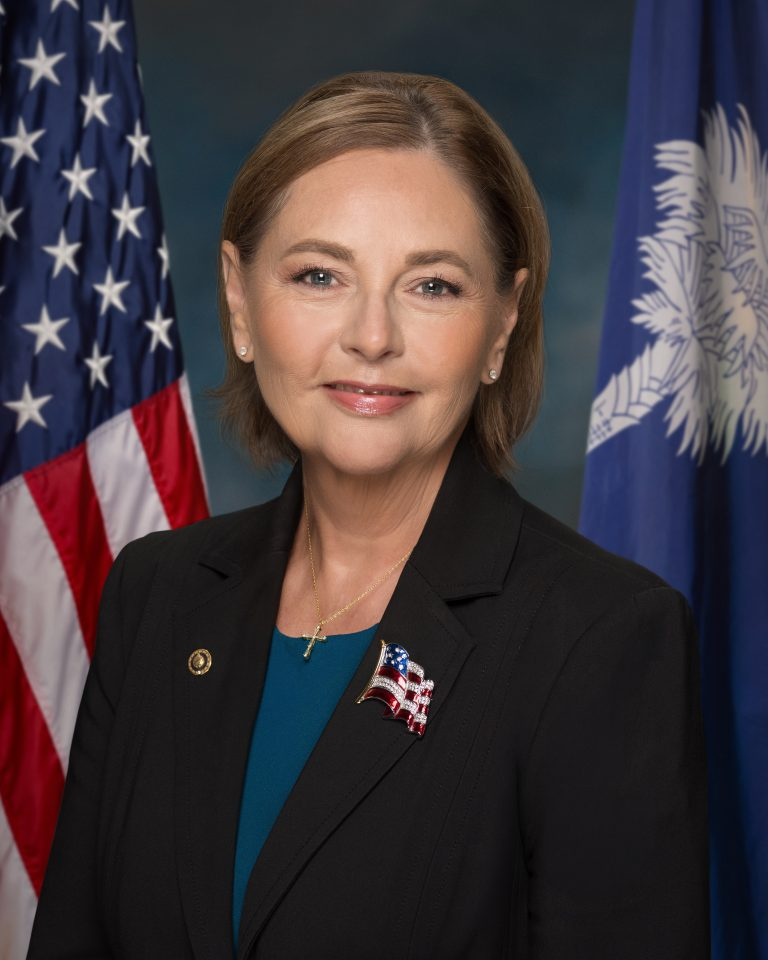
Junior U.S. Senator Darline Graham

==== U.S. House of Representatives ====
District	Member	Photo
1st	Nancy Mace	
2nd	Joe Wilson	
3rd	Sheri Biggs	
4th	William Timmons	
5th	Ralph Norman	
5th	Wes Climer	
7th	Russell Fry	

=== Statewide offices ===
- Governor: Henry McMaster → Alan Wilson (elect)
- Lieutenant Governor: Pamela Evette → Mike Reichenbach (elect)
- Secretary of State: Mark Hammond
- Attorney General: Alan Wilson → David Stumbo (elect)
- Treasurer: Curtis Loftis
- Superintendent of Education: Ellen Weaver
- Adjutant General: Robert E. Livingston Jr.
- Commissioner of Agriculture: Hugh Weathers

=== State legislature ===
- President Pro Tem of the Senate: Hugh K. Leatherman Sr.
- Senate Majority Leader: A. Shane Massey
- Speaker of the House: Murrell Smith Jr.
- Speaker Pro Tempore: Tommy Pope
- House Majority Leader: Davey Hiott

== Notable past elected officials ==
- Strom Thurmond (December 5, 1902 – June 26, 2003) was a United States Senator from South Carolina from 1954 to 2003. Thurmond served as a city and county attorney before he was elected to the South Carolina state senate in 1932. Following completion of military duty during World War II, Thurmond served as the governor of South Carolina from 1947 to 1951. He was a member of the Democratic Party for a decade; it dominated all southern states until after passage of civil rights legislation in the mid-1960s. With other Dixiecrats, he resisted changes for social justice after the US Supreme Court ruled in 1954 that segregation of public schools was unconstitutional. In 1964 he switched to the Republican Party. He has held the records for longest senate career, oldest voting member of the Senate in history, the only Senator to reach 100 years of age while in office, the record for longest filibuster in senate history at 24 hours and 18 minutes, and the longest-serving Dean of the United States Senate, after maintaining the position for 14 years.
- Robert Smalls (April 5, 1839 – February 23, 1915), one of the founders of the South Carolina Republican Party, was an African-American slave in South Carolina who escaped to become a free man, war hero, and a politician. Born into slavery, Smalls was taken by his masters to Charleston, South Carolina in 1851; there he worked at several different labor jobs. At the onset of the Civil War in 1861, Smalls was hired to work aboard a steamship named Planter, which served as an armed transport for the Confederate Army carrying guns and ammunition. On May 13, 1862, he and other black crew aboard the Planter seized control of the ship and successfully turned it and its cargo over to the Union Army. Smalls gained heroic status and was appointed as the first African-American captain of a U. S. military vessel. After the war, Smalls entered politics and joined the Republican Party. He was elected to the South Carolina House of Representatives from 1868 to 1870 and the South Carolina State Senate from 1870 to 1874. Next, he was elected to three terms in the US House of Representatives from South Carolina's 5th congressional district. He was the last Republican to be elected from that district until 2010, as Democrats suppressed black voting and disenfranchised blacks at the turn of the century, fatally weakening the Republican Party.

== List of Party chairmen ==
- Robert B. Elliott (1874–80)
- Edmund William McGregor Mackey (1880–84)
- Thomas E. Miller (1884)
- Rev. R. W. Memminger (1892)
- Joseph W. Tolbert (1925–31)
- D. A. Gardner (1932–36)
- J. Bates Gerald (1938–50)
- D. F. Merrill (1950–1956)
- David Dows (1956–58)
- Gregory D. Shorey, Jr. (1958–61)
- Robert F. Chapman (1961–63)
- J. Drake Edens Jr. (1963–65)
- Harry S. Dent (1965–68)
- Raymond A. Harris (1968–71)
- C. Kenneth Powell (1971–74)
- Jesse L. Cooksey (1974–76)
- Daniel I. Ross Jr. (1976–80)
- Dr. George G. Graham (1980–86)
- Van Hipp Jr. (1987–89)
- Barry Wynn (1990–93)
- Henry D. McMaster (1993–2002)
- Katon Dawson (2002–09)
- Karen Floyd (2009–11)
- Chad Connelly (2011–13)
- Matt Moore (2013–17)
- Drew McKissick (2017–present)

== See also ==
- List of governors of South Carolina
- List of United States representatives from South Carolina
- List of United States senators from South Carolina
- South Carolina Democratic Party
- South Carolina's congressional delegations
- Republican National Committee

== Works cited ==
- Abbott, Richard (1986). The Republican Party and the South, 1855-1877: The First Southern Strategy. University of North Carolina Press. ISBN 0807816809.
