= 2013 Republican National Committee chairmanship election =

American party leadership vote

← 2011	January 25, 2013	2015 →
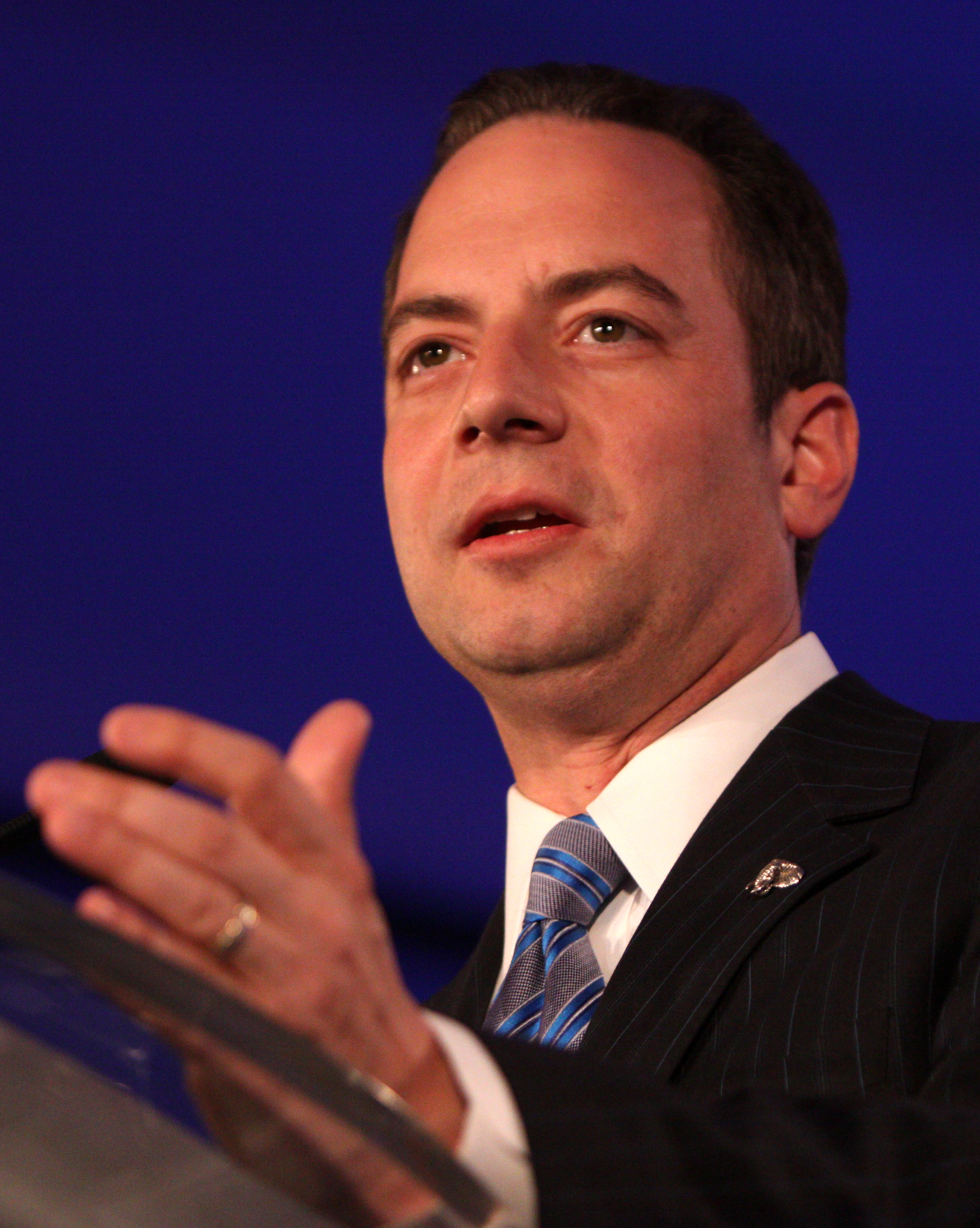
Candidate	Reince Priebus
Caucus vote	166
Percentage	98.8%
Chairman before election
Reince Priebus
Elected Chairman
Reince Priebus

The 2013 Republican National Committee (RNC) chairmanship election was held on January 25, 2013. Then-incumbent RNC Chairman Reince Priebus won re-election with near unanimity in the party's 2013 meeting in Charlotte, North Carolina.

== Candidates ==
- Reince Priebus, then-incumbent RNC Chairman
- Mark Willis, National Committeeman from Maine

== See also ==
- 2013 Democratic National Committee chairmanship election
