= Rich Danker =

Assistant Secretary of Public Affairs at HHS

Rich Danker (born 1983) is a U.S. government official who served as Assistant Secretary for Public Affairs at the U.S. Department of Health and Human Services. Prior to HHS, Danker worked at Chain Bridge Bank and at the U.S. Department of the Treasury in the first Trump administration.

== Early life and education ==
Rich Danker attended the University of Lynchburg, where he founded a student newspaper, and graduated with a bachelor's degree in political science and English. Later, he attended Pepperdine University and graduated with a Master of Public Policy and Master of Business Administration in 2010.

== Career ==
In 2010, Danker joined the American Principles Project, where he served as an economic projects director and helped author a report criticizing the Republican National Committee's 2012 autopsy report.

In 2014, Danker served as campaign manager for New Jersey Senate candidate Jeff Bell.

In 2016, Danker founded a super PAC called the Lone Star Committee to support the Ted Cruz 2016 presidential campaign. Following Cruz's defeat, Danker criticized the Cruz campaign for chasing the primary's most conservative voters at the expense of broader appeal.

From 2017 to 2018, Danker served as a senior advisor to Commodity Futures Trading Commission Chairman J. Christopher Giancarlo. Danker also served as a senior advisor at the U.S. Department of the Treasury.

Between his time in the first and second Trump administrations, Danker was a senior vice president for strategy at Chain Bridge Bank.

In 2025, Danker was tapped as Assistant Secretary for Public Affairs at the U.S. Department of Health and Human Services, where he replaced outgoing Assistant Secretary Tom Corry. Danker remained at HHS until May 13, 2026, when he resigned in opposition to the agency's plans to approve flavored vapes that he argued would appeal to children and expose them to nicotine addiction, lung damage, and higher risk of cancer. His resignation came the day after FDA Commissioner Marty Makary stepped down for the same reason.

== Writings ==
Danker was a Forbes columnist and has published articles in the The Wall Street Journal, The Weekly Standard, and other outlets.
