= Brad Courtney =

American politician

- Courtney in 2012

Chair of the Wisconsin Republican Party
- In office January 14, 2011 – March 5, 2019
- Preceded by: Reince Priebus
- Succeeded by: Andrew Hitt

Personal details
- Political party: Republican
- Children: 3
- Education: Vanderbilt University (BA)

Brad Courtney is an American politician who served as the chairman of the Republican Party of Wisconsin.

== Biography ==
A native of Whitefish Bay, Wisconsin, Courtney is a graduate of Whitefish Bay High School and Vanderbilt University. He is married with three children. Courtney is also active in his local church and is a member of the board of Young Life.

== Career ==
Courtney began his political career in 1990 when he worked on Richard W. Graber's campaign in the primary election for the Wisconsin State Assembly. Although Graber lost the primary election to Alberta Darling, who went on to win the general election, Graber later served as chairman of the Republican Party of Wisconsin and United States Ambassador to the Czech Republic. During the campaign, Courtney first met Scott Walker. After serving as vice chairman of the Republican Party of Wisconsin, Courtney was promoted to serve his first term as chairman in 2006, succeeding Graber. He did not stand for re-election as chairman the following year and was succeeded by Reince Priebus. Instead, Courtney served as finance chairman of Scott Walker's successful campaign for Executive of Milwaukee County, Wisconsin. In 2010, Courtney was a senior campaign adviser and grassroots coordinator for Walker's successful campaign in the 2010 Wisconsin gubernatorial election. Courtney was chosen for a second time as chairman of the Republican Party of Wisconsin in 2011 after Priebus was selected to be chairman of the Republican National Committee.

Party political offices
Preceded by Reince Priebus	Chair of the Wisconsin Republican Party; 2011–2019	Succeeded by Andrew Hitt
