= Richard Graber =

American lawyer

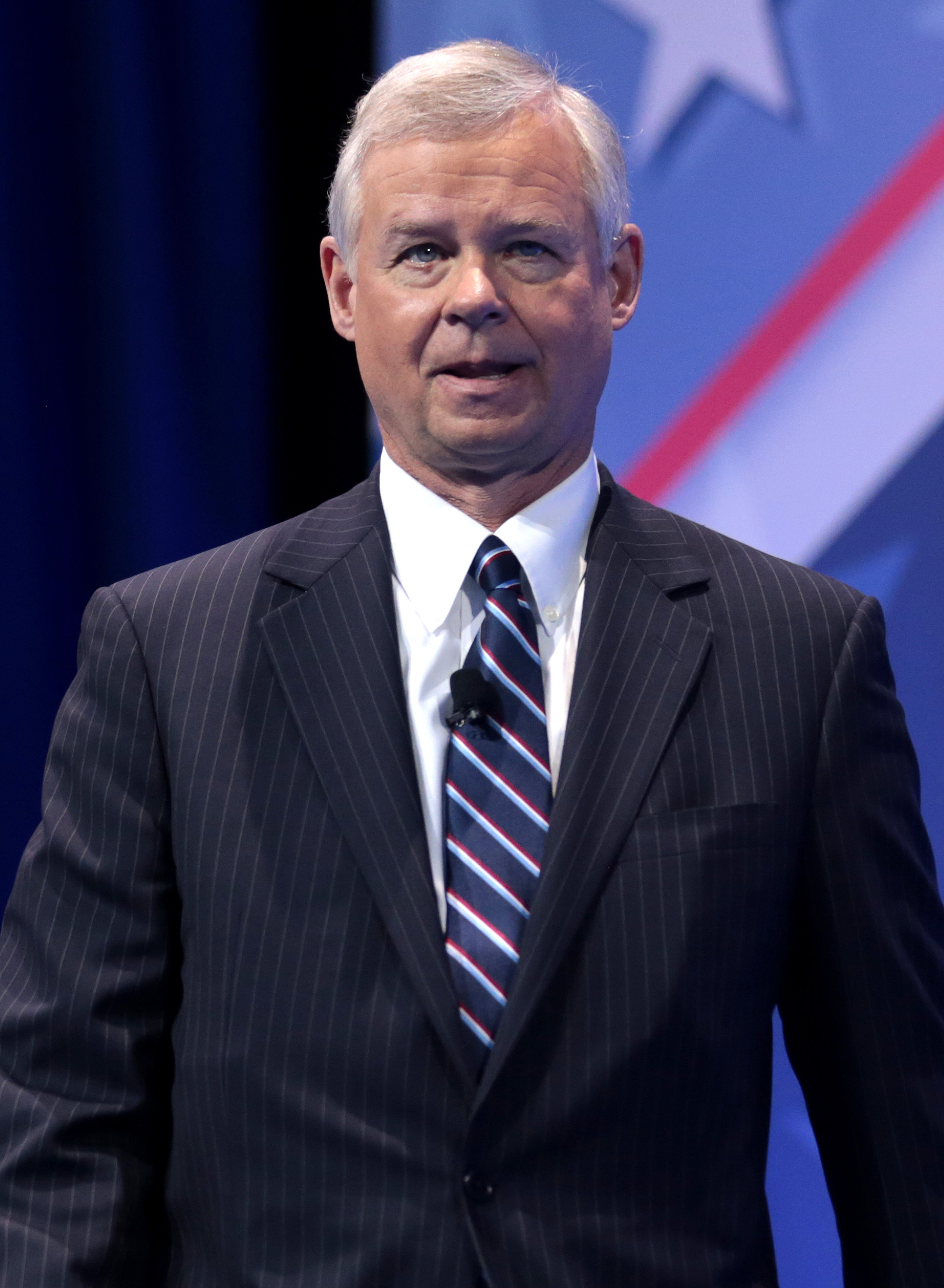

United States Ambassador to the Czech Republic
- In office October 12, 2006 – January 20, 2009
- President: George W. Bush
- Preceded by: William J. Cabaniss
- Succeeded by: Mary Thompson-Jones

Chair of the Wisconsin Republican Party
- In office 1999–2006
- Preceded by: David W. Opitz
- Succeeded by: Reince Priebus

Personal details
- Born: Richard William Graber; 1956 (age 69–70)
- Party: Republican
- Children: 2
- Education: Duke University (BA); Boston University (JD)

Richard William Graber (born 1956) is an American lawyer. A Republican, he served as United States Ambassador to the Czech Republic from 2006 to 2009.

Graber spent 20 years as a partner at the law firm of Reinhart Boerner Van Deuren, eventually becoming the firm's CEO. In 2010, he joined Honeywell as vice president of global relations. In 2016, Graber became president and CEO of the Bradley Foundation.

== Early life and career ==
Graber received a Bachelor of Arts degree from Duke University in 1978 and a Juris Doctor degree from the Boston University School of Law in 1981. He practiced law at Reinhart Boerner Van Deuren, a large Wisconsin law firm, from 1981 to 2006; and returned to that firm after leaving his ambassadorial post. He has served on the board of trustees of the Medical College of Wisconsin and is former vice chairman and director of the Federal Home Loan Bank of Chicago.

== Political career ==
In 1990, Graber ran for the Wisconsin State Assembly in a special election for the 10th district, but lost to Alberta Darling in the Republican primary election. Graber was elected chairman of the Republican Party of Wisconsin in June 1999. He was re-elected in 2001, 2003 and 2005 and was one of the longest serving state chairperson in the country. He served as chairman of the Wisconsin delegation at the 2004 national convention in New York, was a delegate at the 2000 convention and was an alternate at the 1992 and 1996 conventions. From 2002 to 2006, Graber served as Wisconsin's representative on the Republican National Committee's Rules Committee. He also served as finance chairman of the Republican Party of Wisconsin from 1993 to 1999 and as secretary from 1991 to 1999.

He was appointed by George W. Bush as the U.S. ambassador to the Czech Republic on September 14, 2006. His office ended as Barack Obama became the new President of the United States on January 20, 2009. After two years, Norman L. Eisen was appointed as his successor.

Party political offices
Preceded by David W. Opitz	Chair of the Wisconsin Republican Party; 1999–2006	Succeeded by Reince Priebus
Diplomatic posts
Preceded by William J. Cabaniss	United States Ambassador to the Czech Republic; 2006–2009	Succeeded by Mary Thompson-Jones
