= DNC autopsy =

2026 Democratic report on 2024 US presidential election

Build to Win. Build to Last.
- Presented: May 2026; 6 months ago
- Commissioned by: Ken Martin

Official website
- Archived May 21, 2026, at the Wayback Machine

The "Build to Win. Build to Last." report, colloquially known as the DNC autopsy, released in May 2026, is a report created by Paul Rivera that details possible reasons for Vice President Kamala Harris's loss in the 2024 United States presidential election, at the request of Democratic National Committee (DNC) Chair Ken Martin. The report was released in 2026 following widespread speculation of its contents. The autopsy received negative reception due to its lack of content and delayed delivery.

== Background ==
=== Creation ===
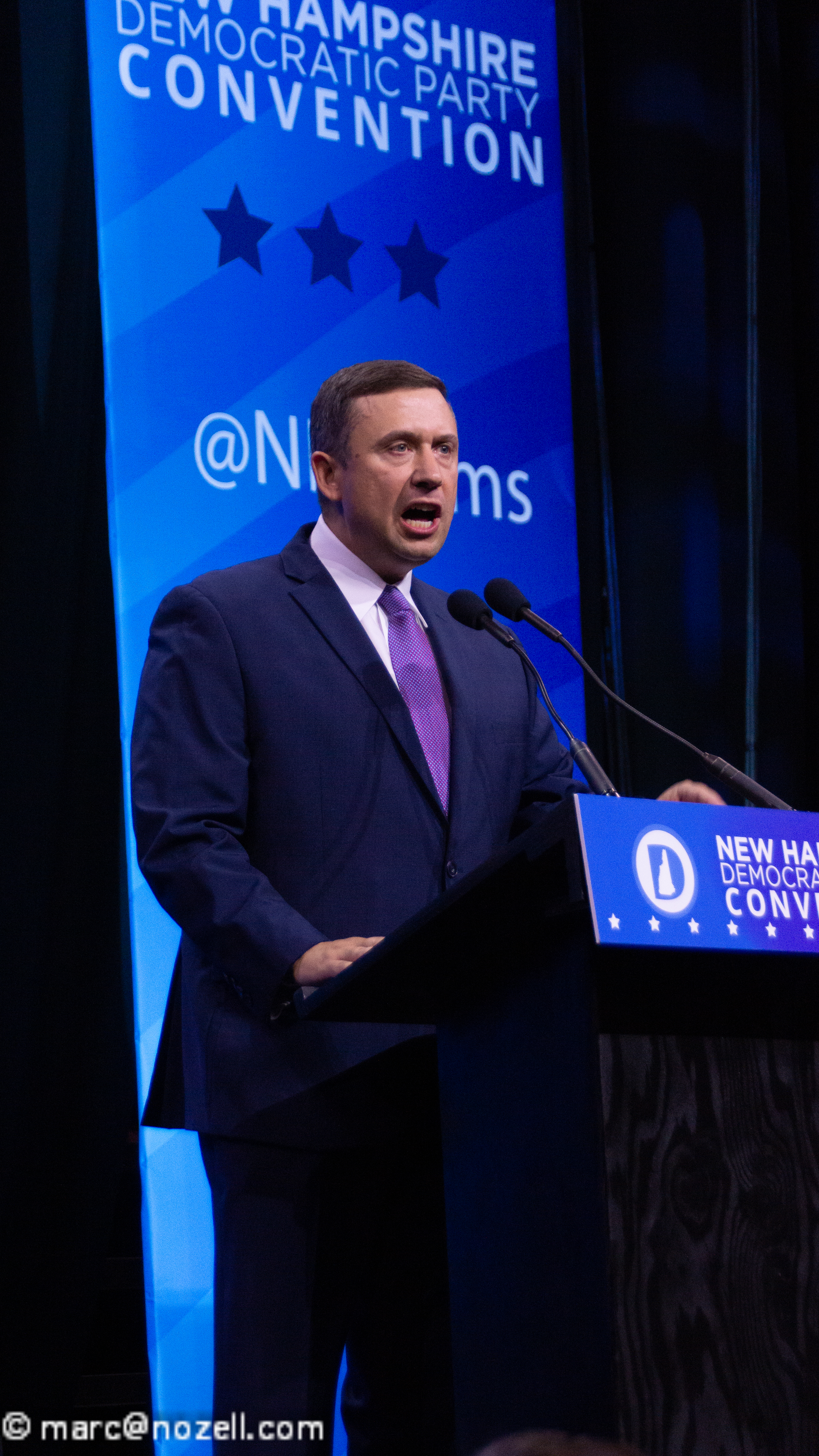
The report was ordered by DNC Chair Ken Martin.

Following the 2024 presidential election, Democratic National Committee (DNC) Chairman Ken Martin selected Paul Rivera to create the report. According to Martin, Rivera was not paid.

=== Release ===
In late April 2026, Ken Martin went on Pod Save America to defend not releasing the report. The interview went viral.

In early May 2026, Harris told donors she believed the Democratic National Committee should release the report.

CNN was the first outlet to release the report on May 21, 2026. The DNC made it public only after it had been published by CNN. With the release, DNC Chair Ken Martin stated the report "wasn't ready for primetime" when he initially received it. He said the project would have had to be redone.

After last November's massive Democratic wins, I didn't want to create a distraction, but by not putting the report out, I ended up creating an even bigger distraction. For that, I sincerely apologize. For full transparency, I am releasing the report as we received it, in its entirety, unedited and unabridged. It does not meet my standards, and it won't meet your standards, but I am doing this because people need to be able to trust the Democratic Party and trust our word.

— Ken Martin

According to Martin, after the release, Paul Rivera was no longer associated with the DNC.

== Contents ==
=== Structure ===
The paper begins with an introduction and "Why now" behind its creation. The methodology section states the report is based on "a range of publicly and commercially available data," as well as information collected from over 300 interviews of organizations and individuals. An electoral landscape section recaps general and midterm elections from 2008 up to 2024. A heavily notated "What Happened" section analyzed governors' races, Senate races, and uncited demographic data. It also provided a lessons section from state campaigns. Other sections discussed communication, research and strategy, organizing, and technology and data. Two sections covered fundraising and spending.

=== Report's arguments ===
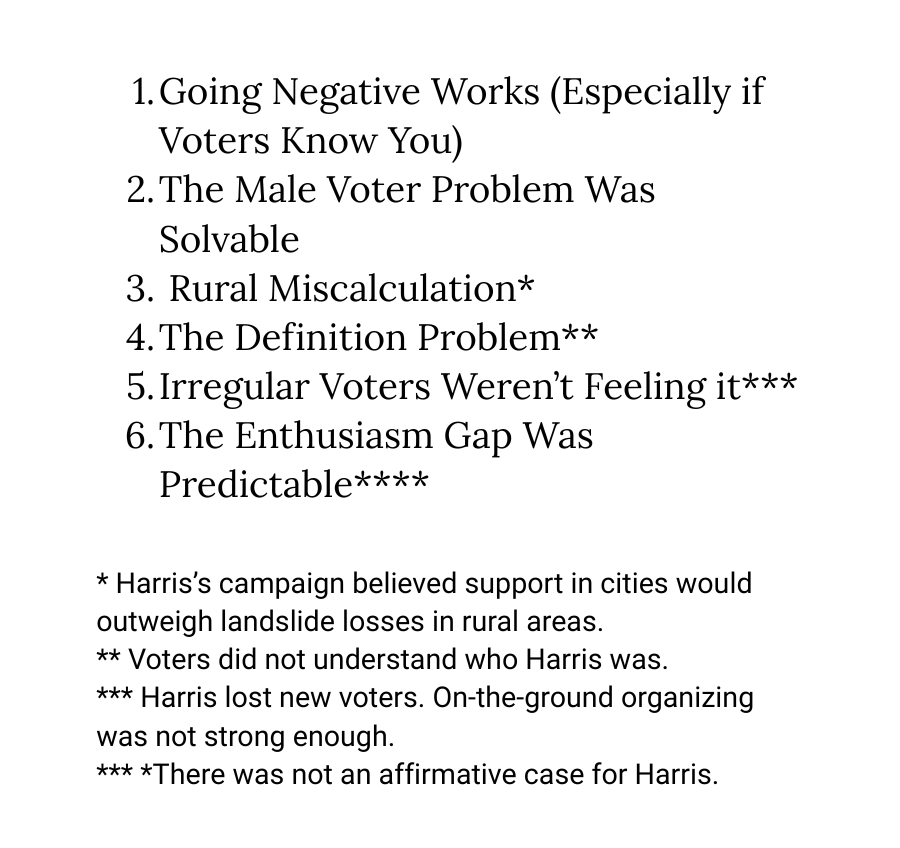
The six lessons for the DNC following the 2024 election according to Paul Rivera.

Despite not having a formal conclusion or summary, Rivera provided some overarching views of why Democrats lost in 2024.

The report stated the economy was poor and Harris lost the economic argument. The term "Bidenomics" also received criticism for linking the Democratic president's name to "economic anxiety." According to Rivera, pollsters wanted Harris to reject the status quo. The autopsy also said Harris was not well prepared to take over the campaign.

In Rivera's view, Democrats assumed Trump was unacceptable and that undecided voters "would automatically vote Democratic."

In one section, the report suggested the GOP won because of social media reach.

Rivera suggested future campaigns could spend $300 million on on-the-ground organizing. The report argued organizations like Turning Point USA are "always on," not activated during an election season, and Democrats should follow this strategy. Rivera also said that door-knocking was more effective than phone calls and texts. Labor unions were also seen as key to turnout. The autopsy also claimed organizing largely did not start before Labor Day and that earlier messaging may have been impactful, although Rivera notes the candidate switch made this difficult.

The report also called for more investment in state parties.

The upcoming 2030 census and reapportionment will pose a large challenge to the Democratic Party, according to the report. Rivera argues Democrats need to "meet the moment" and stop "tinkering at the edges" or "history will leave us behind."

=== Unincluded material ===
Analysis of House elections is not present in the "What Happened" section. The report also did not address several key issues in the 2024 election. Israel and Gaza's effect on the election is not mentioned. According to Politico, the autopsy made "sparse" mentions of Biden's choice to remain in the race until June 2024. Joe Biden's age does not appear in the report. The autopsy also does not directly address Joe Biden's decision to run for reelection.

The paper lacks an executive summary and a conclusion. A "Notes for the reader" section is marked as incomplete. The paper resembled a draft. There are no appendices, interviews, or sources provided with the report. Some sources are listed in footnotes but do not appear in inline citations. Many of the claims made by the report are disputed by the DNC in the form of red annotations.

=== Annotations ===
At the beginning of every page a disclaimer reads:

Disclaimer: This document reflects the views of the author, not the DNC. The DNC was not provided with the underlying sourcing, interviews, or supporting data for many of the assertions contained herein and therefore cannot independently verify the claims presented.

Many annotations speculate the source of unsourced content in the report. Multiple unsourced claims may come from public FEC data.

The section covering North Carolina races received particular criticism for inaccuracies.

=== Alleged missing chapter ===
In August 2026, Rivera released an allegedly unincluded chapter of the report that he claimed the DNC removed before its release. Ken Martin disputed that the chapter was submitted to the DNC and said, "If we had this in May, we would have released it with the rest of the report." The "missing chapter" addressed some of the issues the report was criticized for not including, such as Biden's decision to run for reelection, loss of support among minority voters, and criticisms of purportedly out-of-touch consultants and strategists. At the same as releasing the unincluded chapter, Rivera additionally released his own unofficial 564-page report on the election, titled "Blue By 2032".

== Reception ==
Both pro-Palestine and pro-Israel groups responded negatively to the lack of coverage of the Gaza War in the report. The IMEU Project demanded Martin release information showing "Biden's support for Israel to be a net-negative for Democrats in 2024," which they allege Rivera said the DNC had found. Michigan Senate candidate Abdul El-Sayed criticized the report for not "[learning] from our mistakes." Former DNC vicechair David Hogg stated he had told Rivera that "we need to acknowledge the role that Gaza played in us losing younger voters." Representative Alexandria Ocasio-Cortez said the blindspot was "notable." Jewish Democratic Council of America CEO Halie Soifer said she was surprised to find zero mention of "Jews" in the paper.

Third Way President Jon Cowan asserted his view that the unfinished report called for Democrats to move more to the center and that Democrats needed "combative centrism that rejects identity politics, reclaims the vital center, and positions the party as fighters on the economic issues that matter most to voters."

Climate Defiance criticized the report for including only one mention of climate change.

David Hogg and Dan Pfeiffer called for Martin's resignation following the release of the report.

== See also ==
- Joe Biden 2024 presidential campaign
- Kamala Harris 2024 presidential campaign
- RNC autopsy

== Bibliography ==
- "Build to Win. Build to Last" (PDF).
