= Reince Priebus =

American attorney and politician (born 1972)

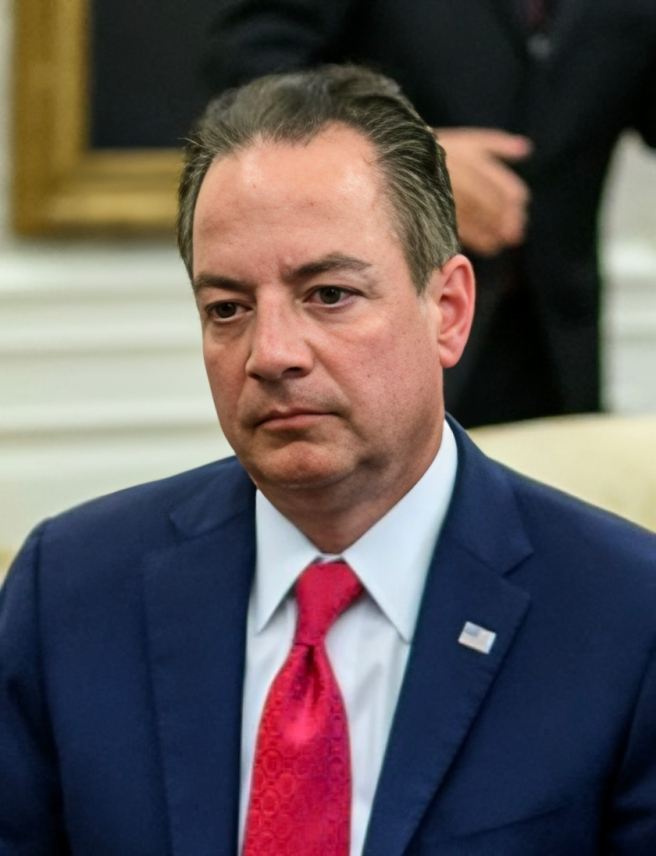
- Priebus in 2025

27th White House Chief of Staff
- In office January 20, 2017 – July 31, 2017
- President: Donald Trump
- Deputy: Katie Walsh; Joe Hagin; Rick Dearborn
- Preceded by: Denis McDonough
- Succeeded by: John F. Kelly

64th Chair of the Republican National Committee
- In office January 14, 2011 – January 19, 2017
- Preceded by: Michael Steele
- Succeeded by: Ronna McDaniel

Chair of the Republican Party of Wisconsin
- In office January 19, 2007 – January 14, 2011
- Preceded by: Richard Graber
- Succeeded by: Brad Courtney

Personal details
- Born: Reinhold Richard Priebus; March 18, 1972 (age 54) Dover, New Jersey, U.S.
- Party: Republican
- Spouse: Sally Sherrow (m. 1999)
- Children: 2
- Education: University of Wisconsin, Whitewater (BA); University of Miami (JD)

Military service
- Branch/service: United States Navy; Navy Reserve
- Years of service: 2019–present
- Rank: Ensign
- Unit: Bureau of Naval Personnel

Reinhold Richard "Reince" Priebus (/ˈraɪns ˈpriːbəs/ RYNSSE PREE-bəs; born March 18, 1972) is an American politician, attorney, and naval officer who served as chairman of the Republican National Committee from 2011 to 2017 and as White House chief of staff during the first six months of Donald Trump's first presidency.

Raised in Wisconsin, Priebus worked as a clerk and graduated from the University of Miami School of Law in 1998. After working for law firm Michael Best, he was elected chairman of the Wisconsin Republican Party in 2007. In 2009, Priebus became the general counsel for the Republican National Committee. He won the 2011 Republican National Committee chairmanship election. As chairman, Priebus frequently criticized the policies of President Barack Obama. He also presided over the Republican Party during the presidential elections of 2012 and 2016, when he opposed Donald Trump during the early stages of the primaries, but later supported him in the general election. He began serving as Trump's chief of staff in January 2017 until resigning in July of that year. Priebus, who had the shortest tenure of any non-interim chief of staff in American history, drew controversy for his management style.

== Early life and legal career ==
Priebus was born on March 18, 1972, the son of Dimitra Pitsiladis and Richard Priebus. Born in Dover, New Jersey, he lived in Netcong, New Jersey, until his family moved to Green Bay, Wisconsin, when he was seven years old. His father is a former union electrician and his mother a real estate agent. His father is of German and English descent and his mother is of Greek descent; she was born to parents originally from Mytilene and Khartoum, since there was a sizable community of Greek settlers in Sudan at the time.

At the age of 16, he volunteered for his first political campaign. He attended Tremper High School in Kenosha, Wisconsin, graduating in 1990. After graduating from Tremper, he attended the University of Wisconsin–Whitewater, where he majored in English and political science, and joined the Delta Chi fraternity. He graduated cum laude in 1994 and prior to that had been elected to serve as student body president.

After graduation from Whitewater, Priebus served as a clerk for the Wisconsin State Assembly Education Committee. He then enrolled at the University of Miami School of Law in Coral Gables, Florida. While there, he worked as a clerk for the Wisconsin Court of Appeals, the Wisconsin Supreme Court, and the United States District Court for the Southern District of Florida, and interned at the NAACP Legal Defense Fund in California.

In 1998, he graduated with a Juris Doctor degree cum laude from the University of Miami, after serving as president of the law school student body. He moved back to Wisconsin and became a member of the state bar. Subsequently, he joined Wisconsin law firm Michael Best, where he became a partner in 2006, practicing in the firm's litigation and corporate practice groups. He currently serves as president and chief strategist at Michael Best and is also chairman of the Board of Advisors.

== Early political career ==
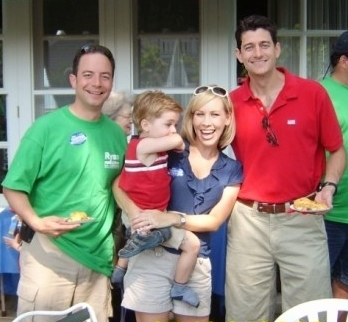
Priebus with his wife and U.S. representative Paul Ryan, 2008

Priebus ran for election to the Wisconsin State Senate in 2004, losing 52 to 48 percent, to the Democratic incumbent, Robert Wirch. In 2007, following a successful campaign, he was elected chairman of the Wisconsin Republican Party, the youngest person to have held that role to date. Two years later, in 2009, he also became the general counsel for the Republican National Committee (RNC).

As chairman of the Wisconsin Republican Party, Priebus led the party to success in the November 2010 elections in Wisconsin, which was previously a state held by the Democratic Party. The party won control of the State Senate and Assembly; a Republican candidate was elected to the governorship. He worked to bring Wisconsin's Tea Party movement together with the mainstream Republican party organization and avoid conflict between the two.

Priebus continued as state party chairman and general counsel to the RNC until 2010, when he stepped down as general counsel to run for election to chairman of the committee.

=== 2011 RNC chairmanship election ===
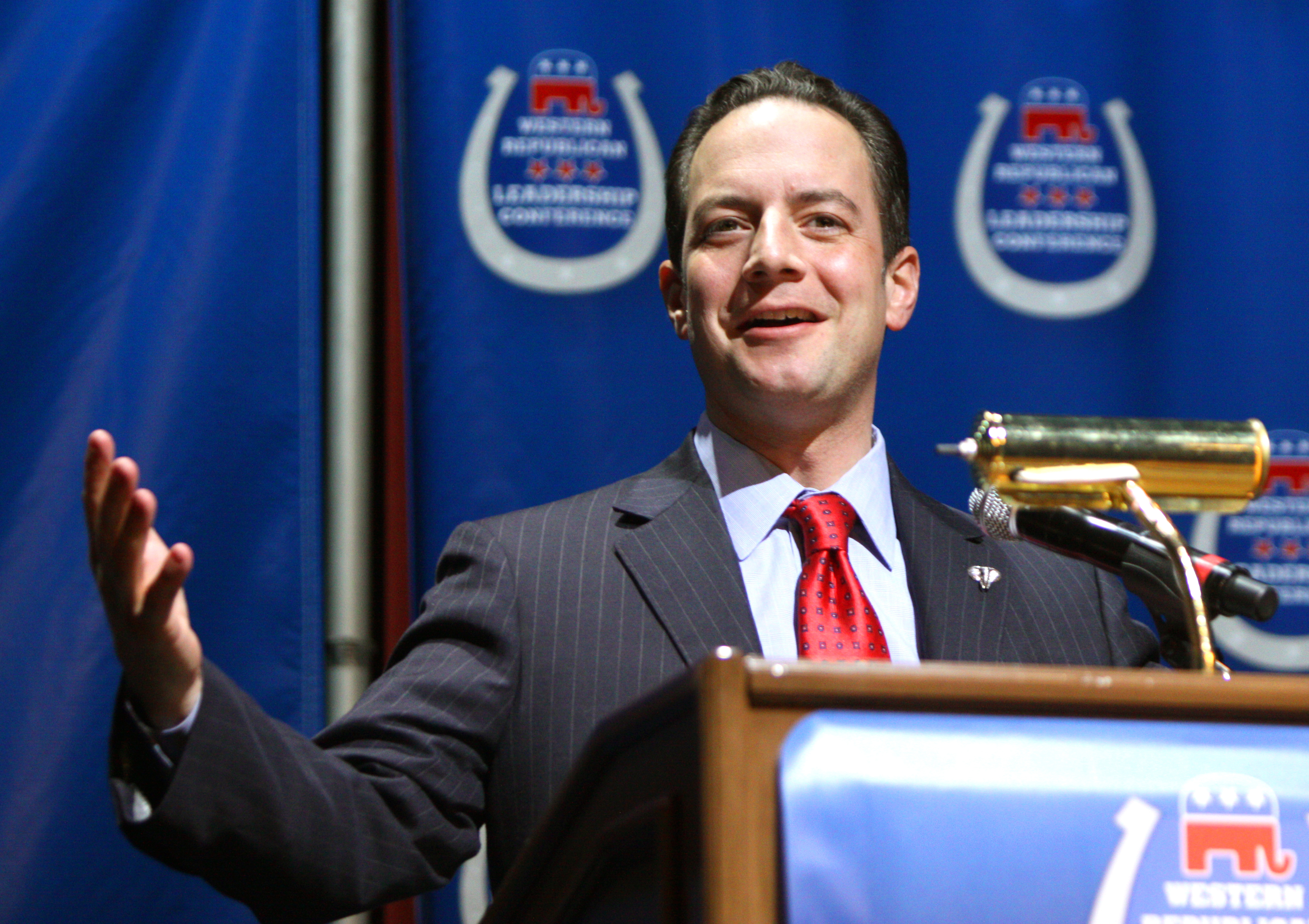
Priebus at the Western Republican Leadership Conference, 2011

On December 5, 2010, Priebus stepped down as general counsel for the RNC. The next day, he sent a letter to all 168 voting members of the RNC announcing his candidacy for chairman. Wisconsin governor Scott Walker supported Priebus' bid from the beginning, attributing the party's victories in Wisconsin to "Priebus' leadership and involvement in the grassroots Tea Party movement that swept the state and the nation". Priebus told delegates in his letter: "I will keep expenses low. I will put in strong and serious controls. We will raise the necessary funds to make sure we are successful. We will work to regain the confidence of our donor base and I will personally call our major donors to ask them to rejoin our efforts at the RNC."

On January 14, 2011, after seven rounds of voting, Priebus was elected chairman of the RNC.

== RNC chairmanship (2011–2017) ==
=== First term ===
At the start of his first term as chairman of the RNC in January 2011, Priebus had inherited a $23 million debt from his predecessor Michael Steele, as well as severely strained relationships with "major donors". Priebus stated that his goals for his leadership were to reduce the debt, rebuild the organization's finances and improve relationships with major donors and party leaders, as well as aiding Republican efforts in the 2012 presidential election. He aimed to develop a strong voter mobilization program, including improved voter registration and absentee ballot programs to identify unregistered voters and those who had not returned their ballots, using funds raised through his initial outreach to major donors. By the end of 2011, Priebus had raised more than $88 million and cut the RNC's debt to $11.8 million.

In the 2012 presidential election, Priebus was a frequent critic of Obama and Democratic leaders. Priebus appeared on such political talk shows as Meet the Press, Face the Nation, Fox News Sunday, and State of the Union with Candy Crowley. He also continued to focus on rebuilding the RNC's finances by reaching out to donors, and at the end of the year the organization reported no debt. After the Republican loss in the election, Priebus called for Republicans to embrace comprehensive immigration reform that would afford illegal immigrants in the U.S. legal status, and ordered reviews of RNC operations, including the party's messaging to young people, women and Hispanics. The analysis of the election cycle would include gathering feedback from numerous volunteers and staffers who were involved at various levels. He began development of a political plan including a long-term strategy to reach demographic groups that had voted mainly Democratic in the November 2012 elections. The plan was labeled "The Growth and Opportunity Project".

On January 25, 2013, Priebus was elected to serve another term. He ran unopposed, and 166 of the 168 RNC members voted to re-elect him.

=== Second term ===
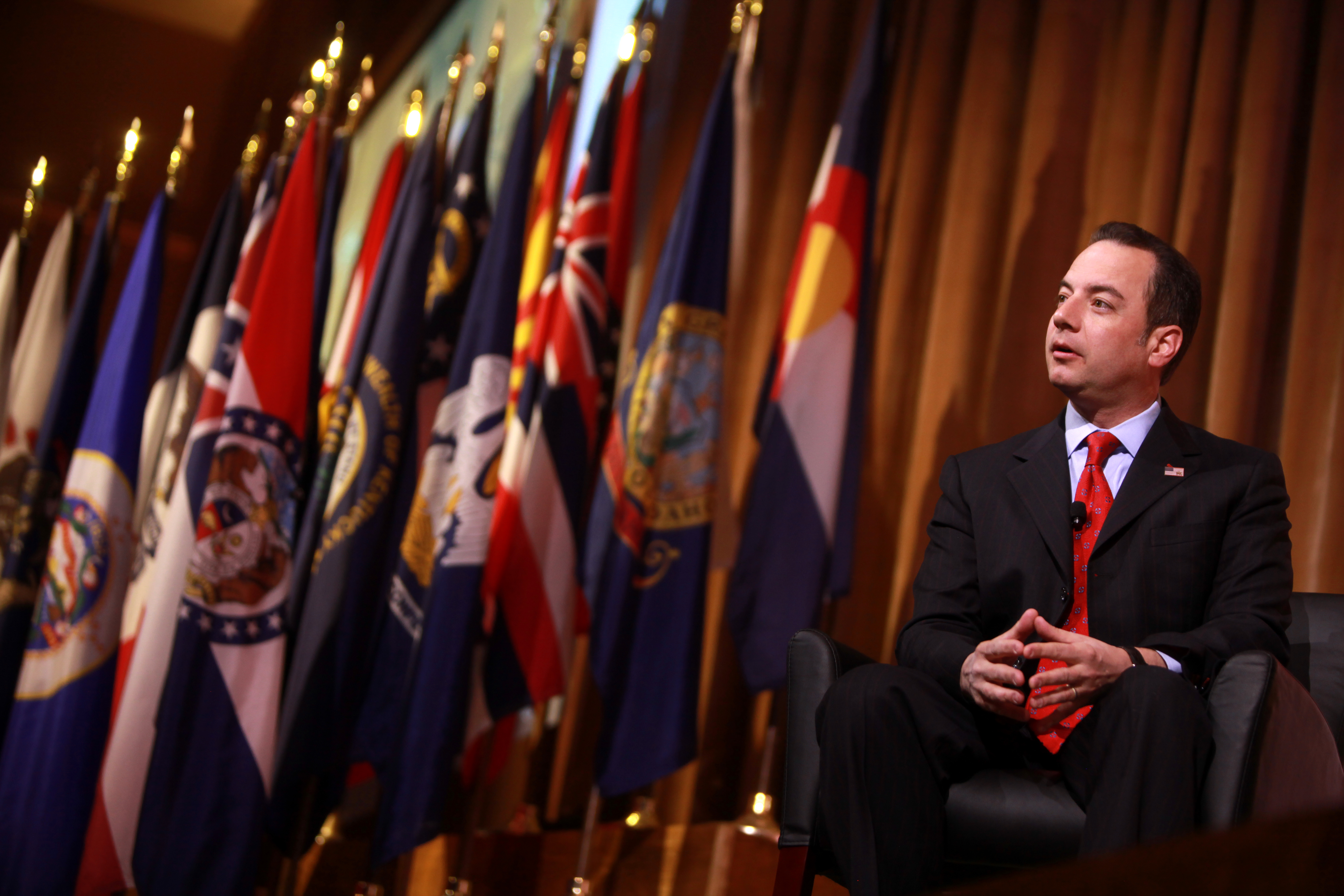
Priebus at the 2014 Conservative Political Action Conference (CPAC)

For Priebus' second term, he set the goal of "transforming the party – to be a force from coast to coast." In his re-election speech, he stated that the party would no longer approach electoral politics from a "red and blue state" perspective.

On March 18, 2013, Priebus presented the completed Growth and Opportunity Project report developed from a listening tour and four-month analysis carried out by Priebus and Republican strategists including Ari Fleischer, Henry Barbour, Sally Bradshaw, Zori Fonalledas and Glenn McCall. The report outlined a comprehensive plan for the party to overhaul its operations. Specific plans outlined in the report included: improving the Republican Party's digital and research capabilities; a $10 million outreach effort to minority communities; supporting immigration reform; and reducing the length of the presidential primary season.

In September 2013, Priebus was successful in persuading both CNN and NBC News to cancel planned biopics of Hillary Clinton, which had been criticized as "free campaigning on Clinton's behalf", according to columnist Jennifer Rubin. Priebus stated that the networks would not be allowed to moderate a Republican primary debate if the films went ahead.

The following year, Politico reported that Priebus had made progress with efforts to make the RNC a year-round operation, particularly through investment into digital technology and field staff.

Continuing Priebus's aim to create an initiative to rival the voter mobilization efforts of the 2012 Obama campaign, in May 2014, the RNC launched the Victory 365 program. The program focuses on communicating with and encouraging the efforts of volunteers across the U.S. to reach others in their communities.

Priebus also worked to reduce the length of the presidential primary calendar, generating support for a RNC rules change to make the primary calendar shorter by up to three months and bringing the national convention forward to late June at the earliest. The rules change was passed almost unanimously in January 2014.

Also following the Growth and Opportunity Project report (also called "the autopsy" and "the post-mortem"), Priebus led efforts to reach out to black, Latino and Asian American voters. In July 2014, he spoke at the National Association of Black Journalists convention, where he said that to support these efforts the Republican Party was spending approximately $8.5 million per month and had established offices in 15 states.

In a speech on October 2, 2014, Priebus laid out the RNC's "Principles for American Renewal", covering 11 goals of the Republican Party in the lead up to the 2016 presidential election. The principles included three economy-related proposals for the Senate to move forward: approval of construction on the Keystone XL Pipeline; federal healthcare law reform; and a balanced budget amendment to the U.S. Constitution. Other goals included in the principles include job creation, care of veterans, immigration reform and reducing government spending. Following the speech, the Democratic National Committee issued a statement criticizing Priebus, calling Republicans "out of step with the American public".

On January 16, 2015, Priebus was re-elected to a third term on a near-unanimous vote.

=== Third term ===
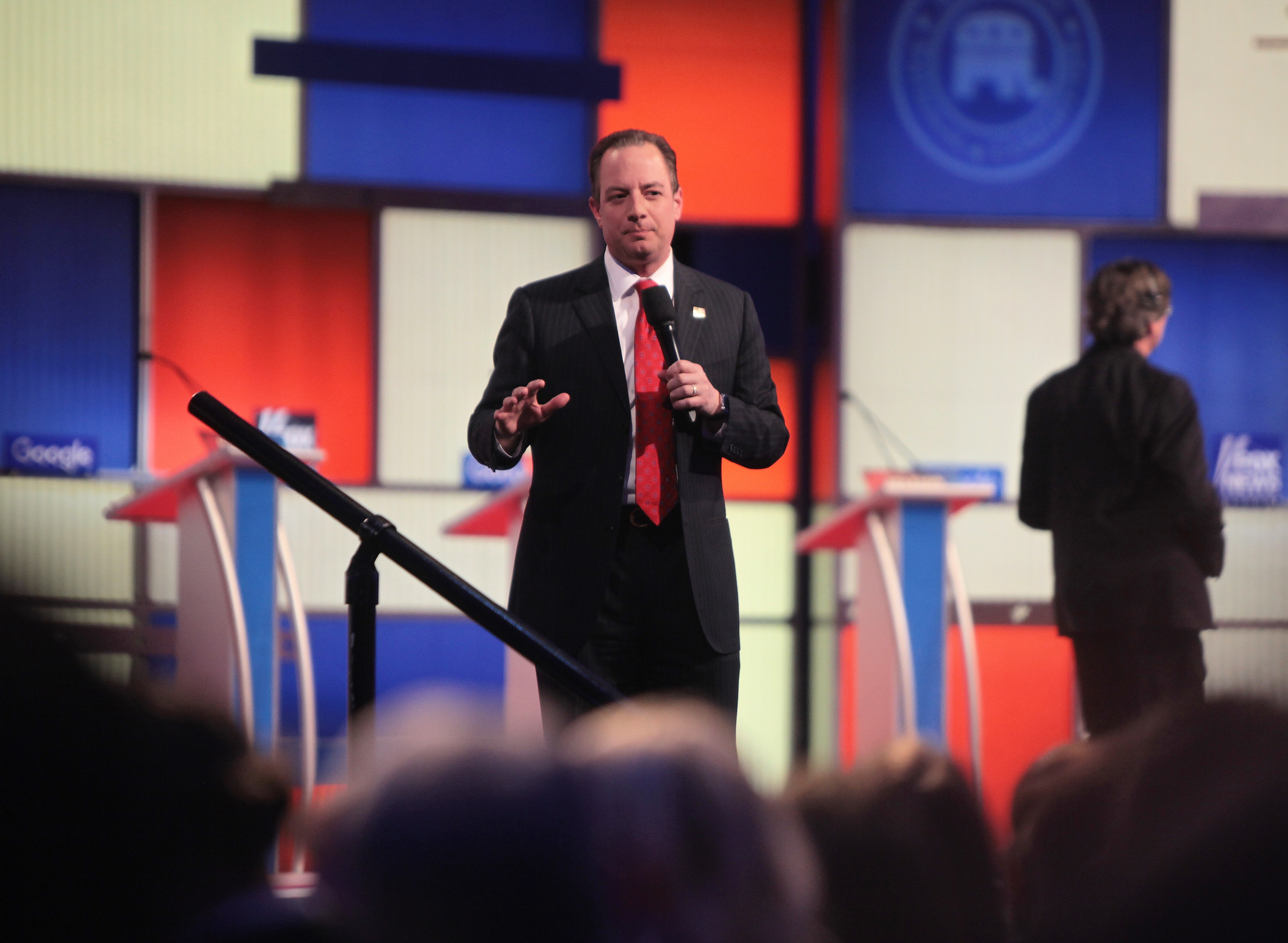
Priebus at the final Republican Party presidential candidate debate before the 2016 Iowa caucus

On October 30, 2015, after the third Republican presidential debate in which there were clashes between the Republican candidates and the debate moderators, the RNC announced that NBC News would no longer host the February 26, 2016 debate in Houston. Priebus showed concerns that an NBC-hosted debate could result in a "repeat" of the CNBC debate, as both are divisions of NBCUniversal, although NBC News is editorially separate from CNBC. Priebus explained that CNBC had conducted the October 28 debate in "bad faith", arguing that "while debates are meant to include tough questions and contrast candidates' visions and policies for the future of America, CNBC's moderators engaged in a series of 'gotcha' questions, petty and mean-spirited in tone, and designed to embarrass our candidates. What took place Wednesday night was not an attempt to give the American people a greater understanding of our candidates' policies and ideas."

After then-Republican presidential candidate Donald Trump delivered controversial remarks about Mexican illegal immigrants in 2015, Priebus reportedly delivered a "stern 40-minute lecture" to Trump. In December of that year, Priebus publicly criticized Trump's proposal to temporarily suspend Muslim immigration in response to terrorist attacks. "I don't agree", Priebus told The Washington Examiner. On April 22, 2016, Priebus appealed for party unity, regardless of who would become the Republican nominee.

In May, after Trump became the presumptive nominee, Priebus again publicly criticized him, saying that Trump was not the head of the Republican Party and that he must "change his tone." He later said that running a third-party candidate would be tantamount to a suicide mission for the Republican Party. After Trump won the Republican nomination, Priebus went on to forge a positive relationship with him and was personally involved in quashing efforts by anti-Trump delegates to prevent Trump's nomination. Yet, on August 1, after Trump criticized the Gold Star family of captain Humayun Khan, a Muslim soldier who was killed in Iraq and whose father criticized Trump, Priebus again criticized Trump publicly, stating, "I think this family should be off limits, and we love them and I can't imagine being the father of a little girl and boy going through the unbelievable grief of them not coming home one day in battle."

On October 4, Priebus called Trump a role model, saying, "You know, I think everyone's a role model in different ways. When you look at someone who has built businesses, lost businesses, came back, lived the American dream, a person who sets goals, he's a winner." Three days later, the Donald Trump Access Hollywood tape was revealed; Priebus announced days afterward that the RNC would continue to support Trump. A December 8, 2016 New York magazine article by Gabriel Sherman reported that "some Trump advisers are dismayed by Priebus's influence because they question the Washington insider's loyalty to the president-elect ... Three sources told me that shortly after the Access Hollywood tape leaked in early October, Priebus went to Trump's penthouse and advised the candidate to get out of the race". However the article does not contain named sources aside from two members of the Trump administration, both of whom were cited to clear discrepancies in the otherwise unsourced article.

On November 13, Trump, who had won the presidential election, announced his choice of Priebus for White House chief of staff.

== White House chief of staff (2017) ==
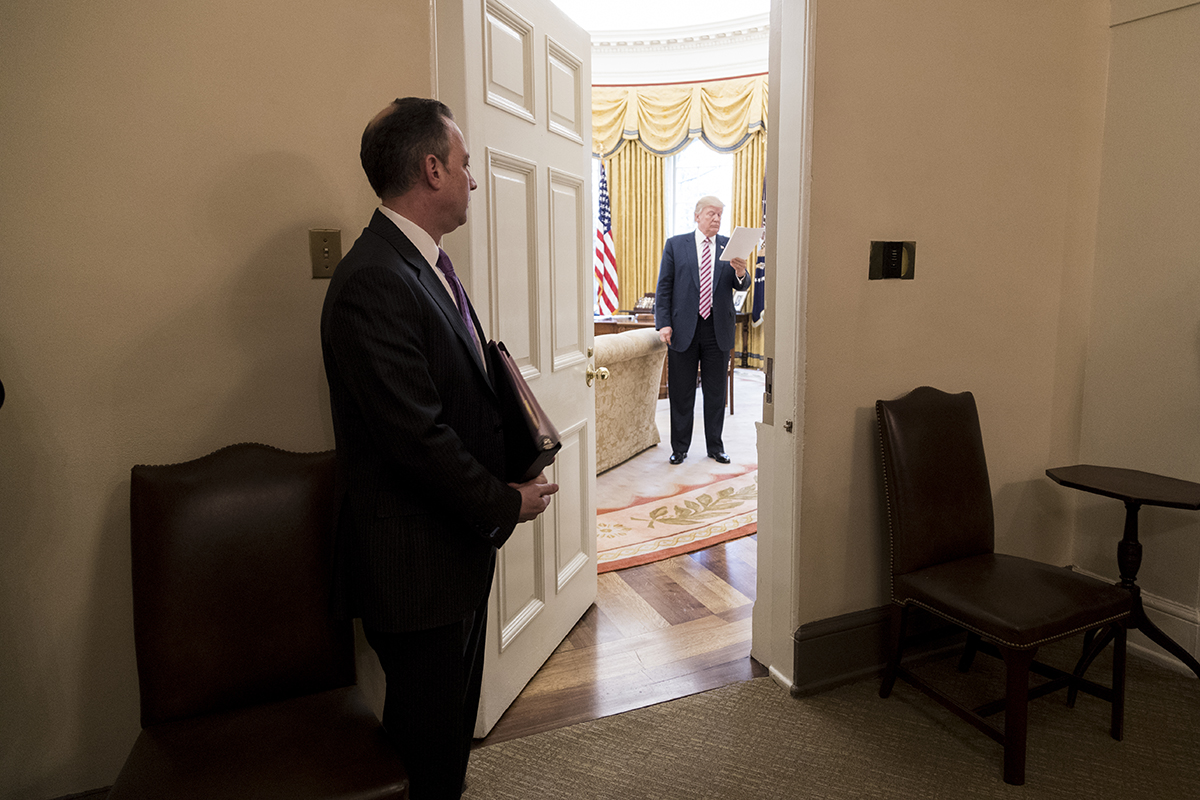
Priebus outside the Oval Office as Trump reads his notes, March 10, 2017

External videos
- CNN's Reince Priebus Resignation interview, YouTube video

As White House chief of staff, Priebus held nearly singular control over who was and was not able to enter the Oval Office. In one instance, after homeland security advisor Tom Bossert entered the office at Trump's request, "deputy chief of staff Katie Walsh spotted him entering the Oval Office and sprinted down the hallway to alert her boss, Mr. Priebus, according to a person familiar with the events. Mr. Priebus subsequently dashed into the office, where he reprimanded Mr. Bossert—in front of President Trump—for trying to meet with the president without him" early in 2017.

On February 19, Priebus said intelligence officials had cleared the Trump campaign of having any contact with Russian spies, contrary to anonymously sourced reports made the previous week by The New York Times, part of what the White House had referred to as "fake news". According to a Politico article dated March 17, 2017, a request by Priebus that the FBI refute allegations of contact by Trump associates with Russian intelligence "appears to have violated the White House's policy restricting political interference in pending investigations".

In a dispute over leaks from the White House, White House communications director Anthony Scaramucci tagged Priebus at the end of a later deleted Twitter post about such leaks, leading to speculation that Scaramucci considered Priebus responsible for them. Priebus stated on CNN that he had resigned on July 27. The following day, Trump announced on Twitter that he had named John F. Kelly as the new chief of staff. Kelly took office, ending Priebus' service, on July 31. This gave Priebus the shortest tenure as permanent chief of staff in history, edging out Kenneth Duberstein, who served as Ronald Reagan's last chief of staff. Priebus remained in the White House "for a couple weeks" and assisted Kelly with transitioning into his new role as chief of staff.

According to author Michael Wolff's book Fire and Fury, Priebus referred to Trump as "an idiot".

== Post–White House career ==
After leaving the White House, Priebus returned to private practice as president and chief strategist of Michael Best, and signed to be a speaker with the Washington Speakers Bureau, working out of Washington, D.C. On June 10, 2019, Priebus was commissioned as an ensign in the United States Navy.

Priebus commissioned in the Navy Reserve as a human resources officer through its direct commission officer program and was attached to the Navy Operational Support Center in Washington, D.C. He was sworn in by vice president Mike Pence on June 10, 2019. Priebus noted his call to serve came after meeting with the wife and children of senior chief petty officer William Owens, a Navy SEAL who was killed early in the administration in a special operations raid in Yemen.

On February 11, 2020, Trump announced his intent to nominate and appoint Priebus to be a Member on the President's Commission on White House Fellowships. Sometime after the September 29 presidential debate with Joe Biden, Priebus told a friend that Trump called him and acted out a script which included declaring victory prematurely on election night, if it appeared that he was ahead in the ongoing vote count.

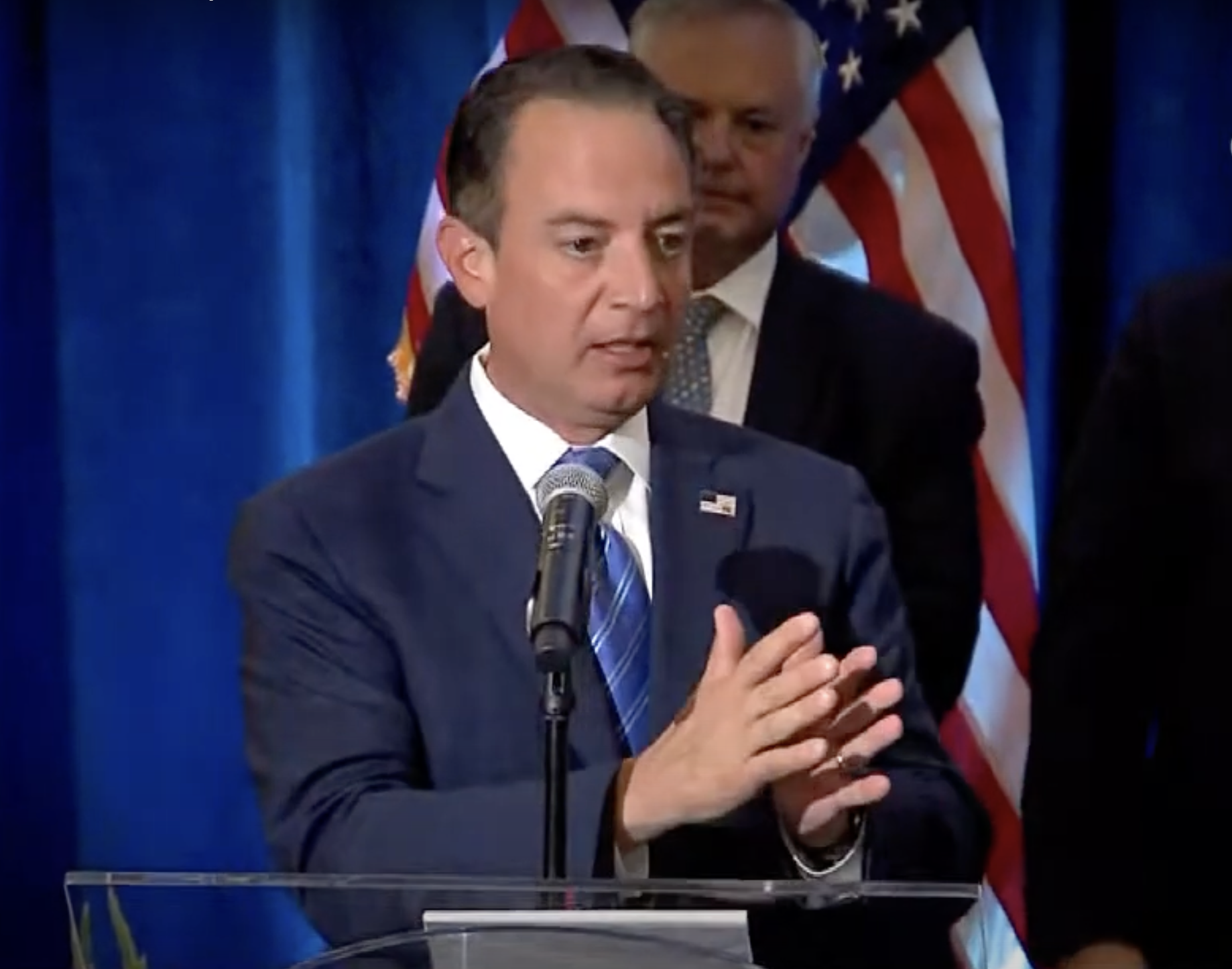
Priebus at the announcement of Milwaukee's official selection to host the 2024 Republican National Convention, 2022

In 2023, Priebus was named as the chairman of the host committee for the 2024 Republican National Convention in Milwaukee. Also in 2023, he was a fellow at the USC Center for the Political Future.

Priebus has been mentioned as a potential candidate for office in Wisconsin on multiple occasions, including during the 2022 gubernatorial race and 2024 U.S. Senate race.

In January 2026, Priebus joined Fox News as a political analyst. He had served as a contributor for ABC News until 2025.

== Personal life ==
In 1999, Priebus married Sally L. Sherrow, whom he met in church when they were teenagers. They have two children. Priebus is an archon of the Greek Orthodox Church.

Party political offices
Preceded by Richard Graber	Chair of the Republican Party of Wisconsin; 2007–2011	Succeeded by Brad Courtney
Preceded by Michael Steele	Chair of the Republican National Committee; 2011–2017	Succeeded by Ronna McDaniel
Political offices
Preceded by Denis McDonough	White House Chief of Staff; 2017	Succeeded by John F. Kelly
