= Glenn McCall =

American politician (1953–2025)

Glenn A. McCall

First Vice Chair of the South Carolina Republican Party
- In office 2008–2025

National SC Committeeman of the Republican National Committee
- In office 2008–2025
- Succeeded by: Tyson Grinstead

Personal details
- Born: Glenn McCall; September 19, 1953
- Died: July 11, 2025 (aged 71)
- Party: Republican
- Education: Amberton University School of Business - MBA 1986; University of Maryland – B.S. 1982

Glenn A. McCall (September 19, 1953 – July 11, 2025) was an American politician who served as first vice chair of the South Carolina Republican Party and National Committeeman representing South Carolina at the Republican National Committee from 2008 until his death in 2025.

== Early life, education and career ==
Born September 19, 1953, McCall grew up with five siblings in Monroe, Louisiana, with their parent, who was a single mother.

McCall received a Bachelor of Science degree in 1982 from the University of Maryland, and a Masters of Business Administration from Amberton University School of Business. He served in the United States Air Force, earning the rank of Staff Sergeant. He worked at the Major Financial Services Corporation, becoming a Senior Vice President.

== Political career ==
=== Local, state and national service in the Republican Party ===
In 2007, McCall was elected chair of the York County Republican Party, noteworthy as one of the few Blacks to ever hold the position in the state.

As the national committeeman for the Republican Party of South Carolina, McCall served on the RNC Resolutions and Rules Committees. He attended every convention from 2002 on. McCall also served as chair of the Delegate Experience Subcommittee for the 2012 Republican National Convention and on the Executive Committee of the Committee on Arrangements. In 2020 he chaired the Standing Budget Committee, co-chaired the RNC Committee on Arrangements, and led RNC efforts to keep the South Carolina Republican Presidential Primary's 'First in the South' status.

McCall won re-election as the national committeeman in May 2016, and served as a delegate to the 2016 Republican National Convention.

=== Electoral college ===
- See: 2016 United States presidential election in South Carolina
- See: List of 2016 United States presidential electors

McCall served as an Elector of the Republican party in South Carolina during the 2016 United States Presidential Election.

=== Republican National Committee Special Projects ===
See Growth and Opportunity Project

McCall, along with Reince Priebus, Ari Fleischer, Henry Barbour, Sally Bradshaw, and Zori Fonalledas created the Growth and Opportunity Project Report after conducting a series of focus groups in 2013 in the wake of Barack Obama's win over Mitt Romney.

=== Republican party positions ===
In February 2025, as the South Carolina Supreme Court announced it would hear oral arguments on the Heartbeat law, a statewide letter sent to South Carolina Republicans signed jointly by SC National Committeeman McCall, SC National Committeewoman Cindy Costa, and state chair Drew McKissick, expressed support for the law.

=== Minorities in the party ===
In a 2016 article, McCall expressed his satisfaction with evidence of an increasingly racially diverse Republican party, after a press conference supporting Senator Marco Rubio's bid for president, flanked by Senator Tim Scott, an African-American, Governor Nikki Haley, an Asian-American woman, and Congressman Trey Gowdy, a white male.

=== Confederate flag debate and removal ===
McCall noted that South Carolina "missed some opportunities" because of the confederate flag controversy, and stood with Governor Nikki Haley and others when the legislation to remove the flag from the South Carolina State House grounds was signed.

== Community service ==
McCall served as the chairman of the board of trustees for Winthrop University and ex-officio member of the Winthrop University Foundation board of directors, serving from 2011 until his death. He was initially appointed as the education superintendent designee, was appointed in 2014 by the state legislature to an at-large seat, and re-elected for a term ending in 2027. McCall was re-elected to serve as chair in June 2025, shortly before his death.

== Personal life and death ==
McCall and his wife Linda had three children and one grandchild. He died after complications from surgery on July 11, 2025, at the age of 71.
