= 2016 United States presidential election in South Carolina =

- November 8, 2016
- Turnout: 67.86% ▼

Nominee	Donald Trump	Hillary Clinton
Party	Republican	Democratic
Home state	New York	New York
Running mate	Mike Pence	Tim Kaine
Electoral vote	9	0
Popular vote	1,155,389	855,373
Percentage	54.94%	40.67%

Trump
40–50%
50–60%
60–70%
70–80%
80–90%
90–100%
Clinton
40–50%
50–60%
60–70%
70–80%
80–90%
90–100%
Tie/No Votes
President before election
Barack Obama
Democratic
Elected President
Donald Trump
Republican

Treemap of the popular vote by county.

The 2016 United States presidential election in South Carolina was held on November 8, 2016, as part of the 2016 general election in which all 50 states plus the District of Columbia participated. South Carolina voters chose electors to represent them in the Electoral College via a popular vote pitting the Republican nominee, businessman Donald Trump, and running mate Indiana Governor Mike Pence against Democratic nominee, former Secretary of State Hillary Clinton and her running mate, Virginia Senator Tim Kaine.

Out of 3.12 million registered voters, 2.10 million voted, a turnout of 67.86%. Trump continued the Republican tradition in South Carolina, carrying the state with 54.9% of the vote. Clinton received 40.7% of the vote, underperforming Barack Obama's 2012 performance by about 4%. Trump became the first Republican to win the White House without carrying Charleston County since Dwight Eisenhower in 1956.

As of 2024, this is the last time the Democratic candidate won Clarendon and Dillon counties.

== Primary elections ==
On February 20 and 27, 2016, in the presidential primaries, South Carolina voters expressed their preferences for the Republican and Democratic parties' respective nominees for president. Registered members of each party could only vote in their party's primary, while voters who were unaffiliated could choose any one primary in which to vote.

=== Democratic primary ===
South Carolina Democratic primary, 2016
- February 27, 2016

Candidate	Hillary Clinton	Bernie Sanders
Home state	New York	Vermont
Delegate count	39	14
Popular vote	272,379	96,498
Percentage	73.44%	26.02%
- South Carolina results by county Hillary Clinton

The 59 delegates for the Democratic National Convention from South Carolina are allocated in this way. There are 53 pledged delegates and 6 unpledged delegates. For the pledged delegates, each district gets 5 delegates that are allocated proportionally. There are then 18 at-large delegates awarded proportionally.

South Carolina Democratic primary, February 27, 2016
Candidate	Popular vote		Estimated delegates		
Candidate	Count	Percentage	Pledged	Unpledged	Total
Hillary Clinton	272,379	73.44%	39	5	44
Bernie Sanders	96,498	26.02%	14	0	14
Willie Wilson	1,314	0.35%			
Martin O'Malley (withdrawn)	713	0.19%			
Uncommitted			0	1	1
Total votes	370,904	100%	53	6	59

=== Republican primary ===
South Carolina Republican primary, 2016
- February 20, 2016

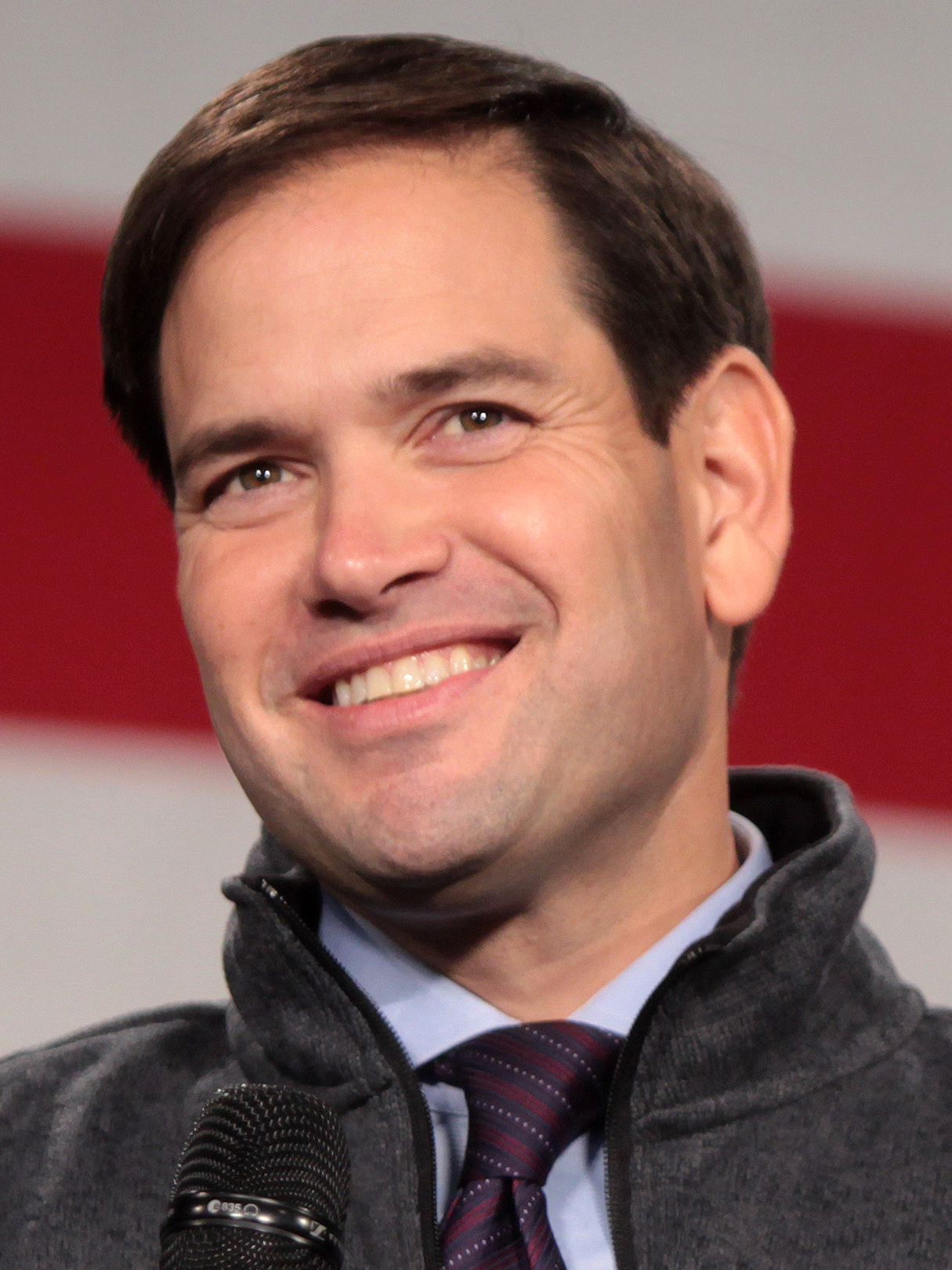

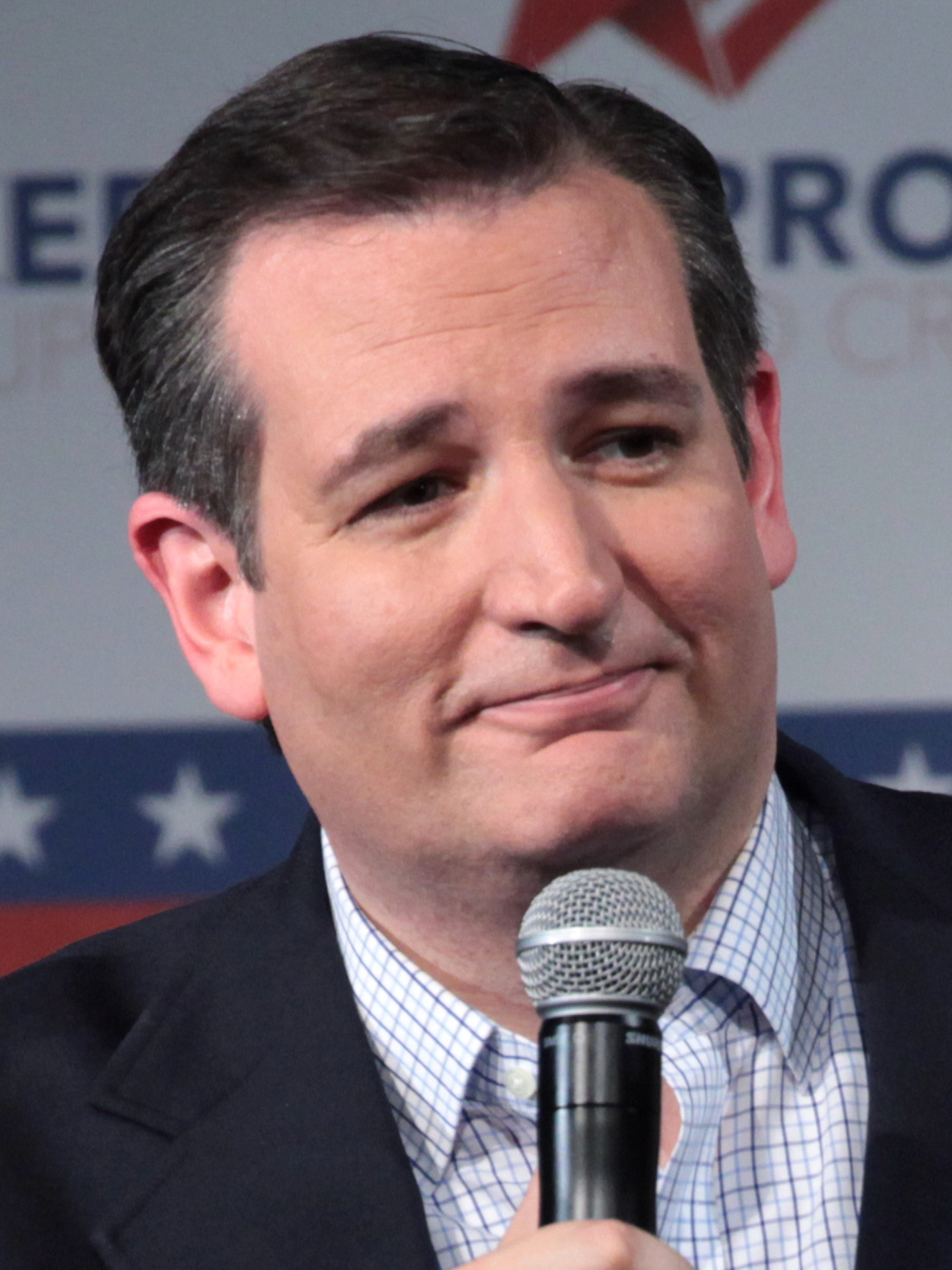

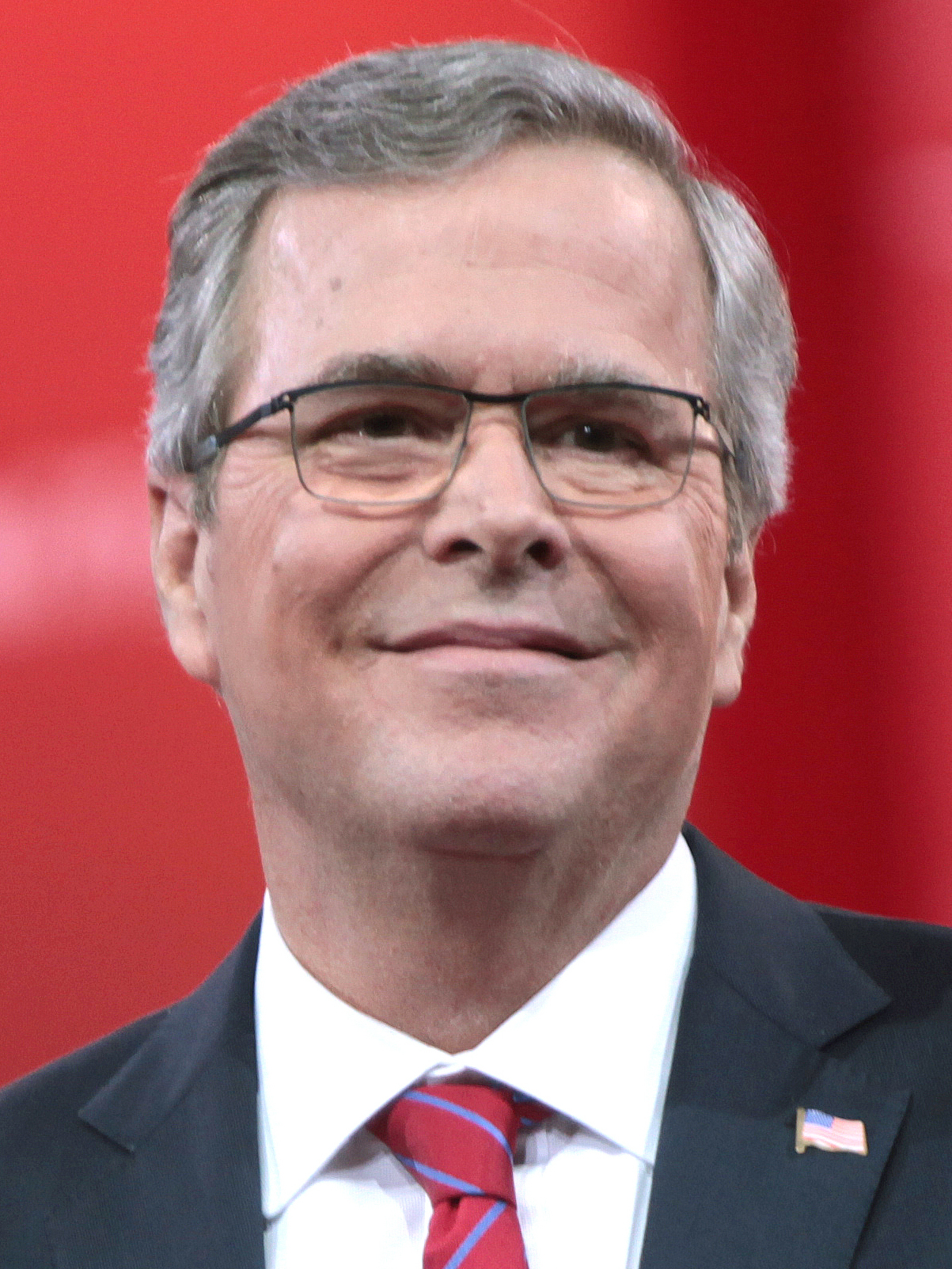

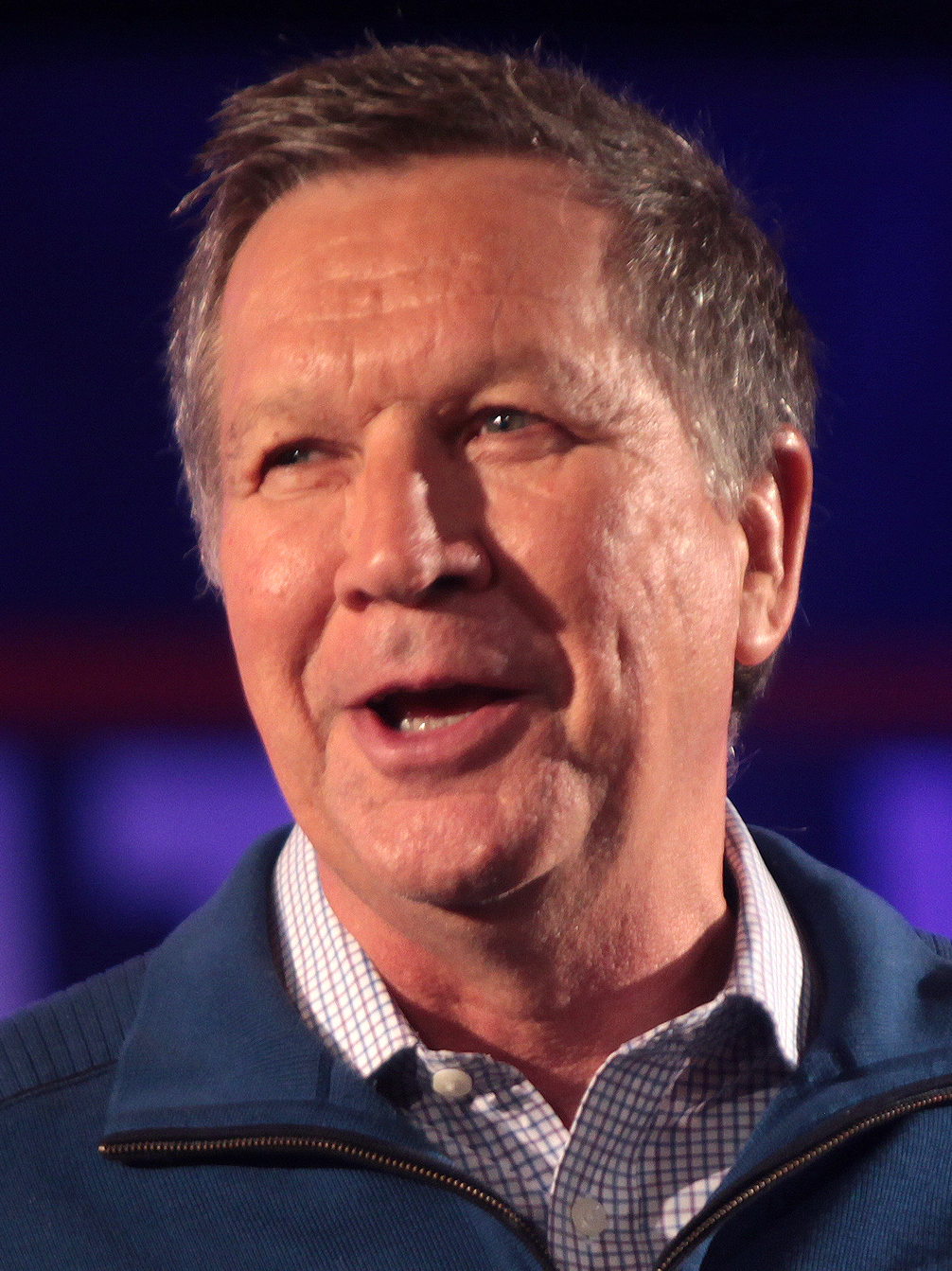

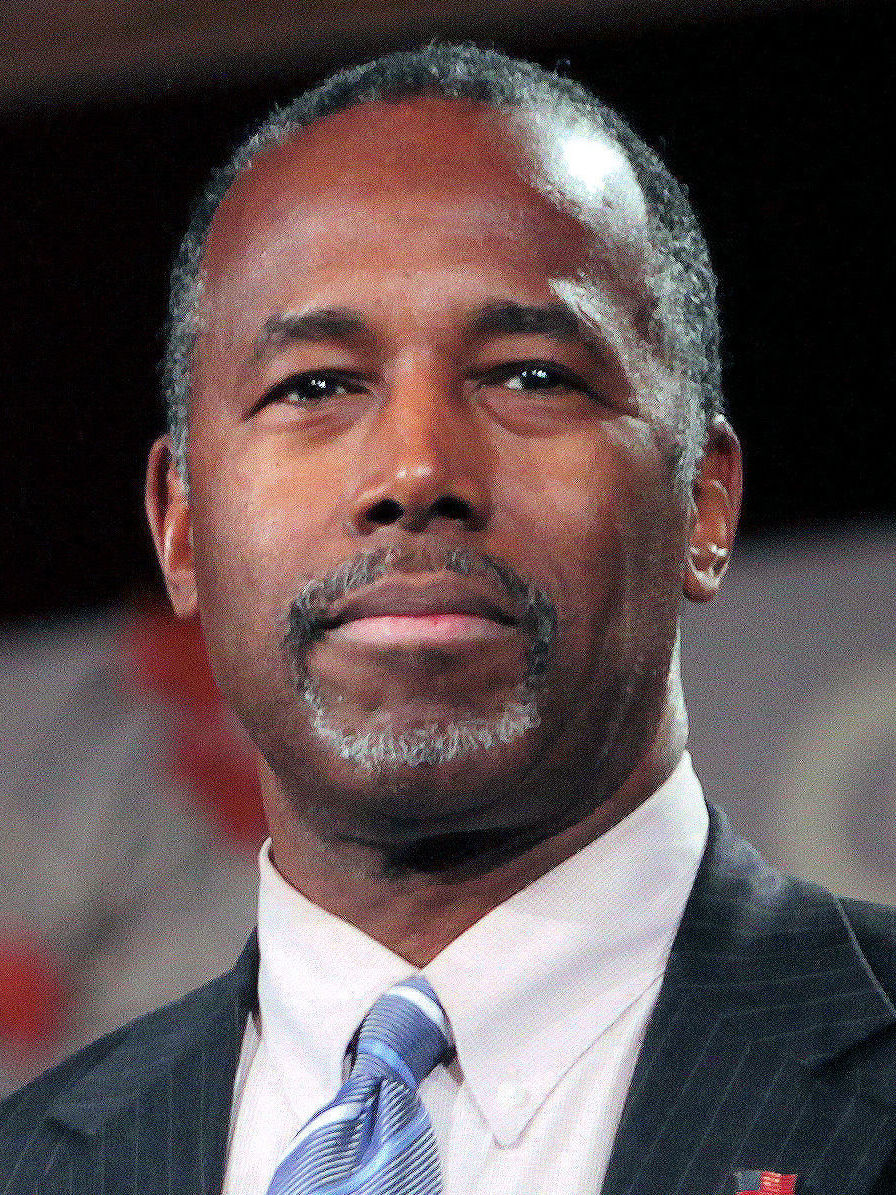
Candidate	Donald Trump	Marco Rubio	Ted Cruz
Home state	New York	Florida	Texas
Delegate count	50	0	0
Popular vote	240,882	166,565	165,417
Percentage	32.51%	22.48%	22.33%
Candidate	Jeb Bush	John Kasich	Ben Carson
Home state	Florida	Ohio	Virginia
Delegate count	0	0	0
Popular vote	58,056	56,410	53,551
Percentage	7.84%	7.61%	7.23%
- South Carolina results by county Donald Trump Marco Rubio

Delegates from South Carolina to the Republican National Convention are awarded in this way: 29 delegates are awarded to the candidate that wins the plurality of the vote in the South Carolina primary. The remaining 21 delegates are allocated by giving the winner of each of the seven congressional districts 3 delegates.

South Carolina Republican primary, February 20, 2016
Candidate	Votes	Percentage	Actual delegate count		
Candidate	Votes	Percentage	Bound	Unbound	Total
Donald Trump	240,882	32.51%	50	0	50
Marco Rubio	166,565	22.48%	0	0	0
Ted Cruz	165,417	22.33%	0	0	0
Jeb Bush	58,056	7.84%	0	0	0
John Kasich	56,410	7.61%	0	0	0
Ben Carson	53,551	7.23%	0	0	0
Chris Christie (withdrawn)			0	0	0
Carly Fiorina (withdrawn)			0	0	0
Rand Paul (withdrawn)			0	0	0
Mike Huckabee (withdrawn)			0	0	0
Rick Santorum (withdrawn)			0	0	0
Jim Gilmore (withdrawn)			0	0	0
George Pataki (withdrawn)			0	0	0
Lindsey Graham (withdrawn)			0	0	0
Unprojected delegates:			0	0	0
Total:	740,881	100.00%	50	0	50
Source: The Green Papers

=== Green state convention ===
On April 30, the Green Party of South Carolina held its state convention. The public was welcome, but only members and delegates were eligible to vote.

On April 30, it was announced that William Kreml had won the primary.

South Carolina Green Party presidential convention, April 17, 2016
Candidate	Votes	Percentage	National delegates
William Kreml	-	-	5
Jill Stein	-	-	3
Sedinam Kinamo Christin Moyowasifza Curry	-	-	-
Darryl Cherney	-	-	-
Kent Mesplay	-	-	-
Total	-	100.00%	8

== General election ==
=== Voting history ===
South Carolina has generally been reckoned to be a solidly red state ever since it voted for Barry Goldwater in 1964. From 1964 on, the Republican ticket has carried South Carolina in every election apart from 1976, when the state voted for Jimmy Carter, from neighboring Georgia. The state even spurned Southern Democrat Bill Clinton in both his elections, in each of which he carried several other Southern states. The state has not had a Democratic Senator since Ernest Hollings retired in 2005, and it has had a Republican majority in its congressional delegation since the so-called "Republican Revolution" of 1994. Four years prior to the 2016 election, in 2012, Republican Mitt Romney defeated Barack Obama by 10.5%.

However, in 2016 some commentators suggested that South Carolina might become a battleground state due to polling suggesting Republican dissatisfaction with Trump, as well as the growing effects of in-migration from other states (as in formerly solidly red Virginia and North Carolina). A poll released on August 10 by Public Policy Polling had Trump leading Clinton by a margin of only 2 points, and an internal poll commissioned for the South Carolina Democratic Party had the race tied. This led Larry Sabato's political prediction website Sabato's Crystal Ball to move the rating of the South Carolina contest from "Safe Republican" to "Likely Republican" on August 18. In the end, however, Trump carried the state by a comfortable 14.3% margin.

=== Predictions ===
Source	Ranking	As of
Los Angeles Times	Safe R	November 6, 2016
CNN	Safe R	November 4, 2016
Cook Political Report	Likely R	November 7, 2016
Electoral-vote.com	Lean R	November 8, 2016
Rothenberg Political Report	Safe R	November 7, 2016
Sabato's Crystal Ball	Safe R	November 7, 2016
RealClearPolitics	Lean R	November 8, 2016
NBC	Lean R	November 7, 2016

^Highest rating given

=== Polling ===
Republican Donald Trump won every pre-election poll, but by varying margins. The last pre-election poll showed Donald Trump leading Clinton 47% to 36%. The average of all polls showed Trump leading 46.2% to 38%.

=== Results ===
United States presidential election in South Carolina, 2016
Party	Candidate	Running mate	Votes	Percentage	Electoral votes
Republican	Donald Trump	Mike Pence	1,155,389	54.94%	9
Democratic	Hillary Clinton	Tim Kaine	855,373	40.67%	0
Libertarian	Gary Johnson	Bill Weld	49,204	2.34%	0
Independence	Evan McMullin	Nathan Johnson	21,016	1.00%	0
Green	Jill Stein	Ajamu Baraka	13,034	0.62%	0
Constitution	Darrell L. Castle	Scott N. Bradley	5,765	0.27%	0
American (South Carolina)	Peter Skewes	Michael Lacy	3,246	0.15%	0
Totals			2,103,027	100.00%	9

==== By county ====
County	Donald Trump Republican		Hillary Clinton Democratic		Various candidates Other parties		Margin		Total
County	#	%	#	%	#	%	#	%	Total
Abbeville	6,763	62.77%	3,741	34.72%	271	2.51%	3,022	28.05%	10,775
Aiken	46,025	61.49%	25,455	34.01%	3,371	4.50%	20,570	27.48%	74,851
Allendale	789	21.97%	2,735	76.14%	68	1.89%	-1,946	-54.17%	3,592
Anderson	56,232	69.87%	21,097	26.21%	3,154	3.92%	35,135	43.66%	80,483
Bamberg	2,204	35.47%	3,898	62.73%	112	1.80%	-1,694	-27.26%	6,214
Barnwell	4,889	51.54%	4,400	46.39%	196	2.07%	489	5.15%	9,485
Beaufort	42,922	54.66%	32,138	40.93%	3,464	4.41%	10,784	13.73%	78,524
Berkeley	44,587	56.07%	30,705	38.61%	4,225	5.32%	13,882	17.46%	79,517
Calhoun	3,787	50.17%	3,573	47.33%	189	2.50%	214	2.84%	7,549
Charleston	75,443	42.78%	89,299	50.64%	11,603	6.58%	-13,856	-7.86%	176,345
Cherokee	15,167	69.70%	6,092	28.00%	500	2.30%	9,075	41.70%	21,759
Chester	7,265	51.19%	6,579	46.36%	348	2.45%	686	4.83%	14,192
Chesterfield	9,312	56.16%	6,858	41.36%	411	2.48%	2,454	14.80%	16,581
Clarendon	7,386	47.98%	7,732	50.22%	277	1.80%	-346	-2.24%	15,395
Colleton	9,091	52.70%	7,627	44.21%	533	3.09%	1,464	8.49%	17,251
Darlington	14,989	50.51%	13,888	46.80%	797	2.69%	1,101	3.71%	29,674
Dillon	5,637	48.19%	5,834	49.87%	227	1.94%	-197	-1.68%	11,698
Dorchester	34,987	55.92%	24,055	38.45%	3,525	5.63%	10,932	17.47%	62,567
Edgefield	6,842	58.76%	4,491	38.57%	311	2.67%	2,351	20.19%	11,644
Fairfield	4,027	35.74%	6,945	61.64%	295	2.62%	-2,918	-25.90%	11,267
Florence	29,573	51.05%	26,710	46.11%	1,648	2.84%	2,863	4.94%	57,931
Georgetown	17,389	54.93%	13,310	42.04%	958	3.03%	4,079	12.89%	31,657
Greenville	127,832	59.41%	74,483	34.62%	12,850	5.97%	53,349	24.79%	215,165
Greenwood	16,961	58.97%	10,711	37.24%	1,091	3.69%	6,250	22.63%	28,763
Hampton	3,488	39.61%	5,170	58.71%	148	1.68%	-1,682	-19.10%	8,806
Horry	89,288	67.17%	39,410	29.65%	4,222	3.18%	49,878	37.52%	132,920
Jasper	5,187	45.39%	5,956	52.12%	284	2.49%	-769	-6.73%	11,427
Kershaw	17,542	60.50%	10,330	35.63%	1,123	3.87%	7,212	24.87%	28,995
Lancaster	23,719	60.91%	13,812	35.47%	1,407	3.62%	9,907	25.44%	38,938
Laurens	16,816	63.30%	8,889	33.46%	861	3.24%	7,927	29.84%	26,566
Lee	2,803	34.37%	5,199	63.74%	154	1.89%	-2,396	-29.37%	8,156
Lexington	80,026	65.55%	35,230	28.86%	6,837	5.59%	44,796	36.69%	122,093
Marion	5,444	38.13%	8,569	60.02%	263	1.85%	-3,125	-21.88%	14,276
Marlboro	4,267	41.07%	5,954	57.31%	168	1.62%	-1,687	-16.24%	10,389
McCormick	2,652	50.84%	2,479	47.53%	85	1.63%	173	3.31%	5,216
Newberry	10,017	59.60%	6,217	36.99%	573	3.41%	3,800	22.61%	16,807
Oconee	24,178	71.88%	7,998	23.78%	1,459	4.34%	16,180	48.10%	33,635
Orangeburg	11,931	30.66%	26,318	67.64%	661	1.70%	-14,387	-36.98%	38,910
Pickens	36,236	73.88%	10,354	21.11%	2,459	5.01%	25,882	52.77%	49,049
Richland	52,469	31.10%	108,000	64.01%	8,253	4.89%	-55,531	-32.91%	168,722
Saluda	5,526	64.53%	2,813	32.85%	225	2.62%	2,713	31.68%	8,564
Spartanburg	76,277	62.99%	39,997	33.03%	4,816	3.98%	36,280	29.96%	121,090
Sumter	18,745	42.52%	24,047	54.55%	1,294	2.93%	-5,302	-12.03%	44,086
Union	7,061	58.39%	4,729	39.11%	302	2.50%	2,332	19.28%	12,092
Williamsburg	4,864	32.31%	9,953	66.12%	237	1.57%	-5,089	-33.81%	15,054
York	66,754	58.37%	41,593	36.37%	1,533	1.53%	25,161	22.00%	114,357
Totals	1,155,389	54.94%	855,373	40.67%	92,265	4.39%	300,016	14.27%	2,103,027

Counties that flipped from Democratic to Republican

- Barnwell (largest city: Barnwell)
- Calhoun (largest town: St. Matthews)
- Chester (largest city: Chester)
- Colleton (largest city: Walterboro)
- Darlington (largest city: Hartsville)
- McCormick (largest town: McCormick)

==== By congressional district ====
Trump won six of seven congressional districts.

District	Trump	Clinton	Representative
1st	53%	40%	Mark Sanford
2nd	56%	38%	Joe Wilson
3rd	67%	29%	Jeff Duncan
4th	60%	34%	Trey Gowdy
5th	57%	39%	Mick Mulvaney
6th	30%	67%	Jim Clyburn
7th	58%	39%	Tom Rice

== Electors ==
Technically the voters of South Carolina cast their ballots for electors: representatives to the Electoral College. South Carolina is allocated 9 electors because it has 7 congressional districts and 2 senators. All candidates who appear on the ballot or qualify to receive write-in votes must submit a list of 9 electors, who pledge to vote for their candidate and their running mate. Whoever wins the majority of votes in the state is awarded all 9 electoral votes. Their chosen electors then vote for president and vice president. Although electors are pledged to their candidate and running mate, they are not obligated to vote for them. An elector who votes for someone other than their candidate is known as a faithless elector.

The electors of each state and the District of Columbia met on December 19, 2016, to cast their votes for president and vice president. The Electoral College itself never meets as one body. Instead the electors from each state and the District of Columbia met in their respective capitols.

The following were the members of the Electoral College from the state. All 9 were pledged for Trump/Pence.

- Glenn McCall
- Matt Moore
- Terry Hardesty
- Jim Ulmer
- Brenda Bedenbaugh
- Bill Conley
- Shery Smith
- Moye Graham
- Jerry Rovner
