= 2013 Democratic National Committee chairmanship election =

- January 22, 2013
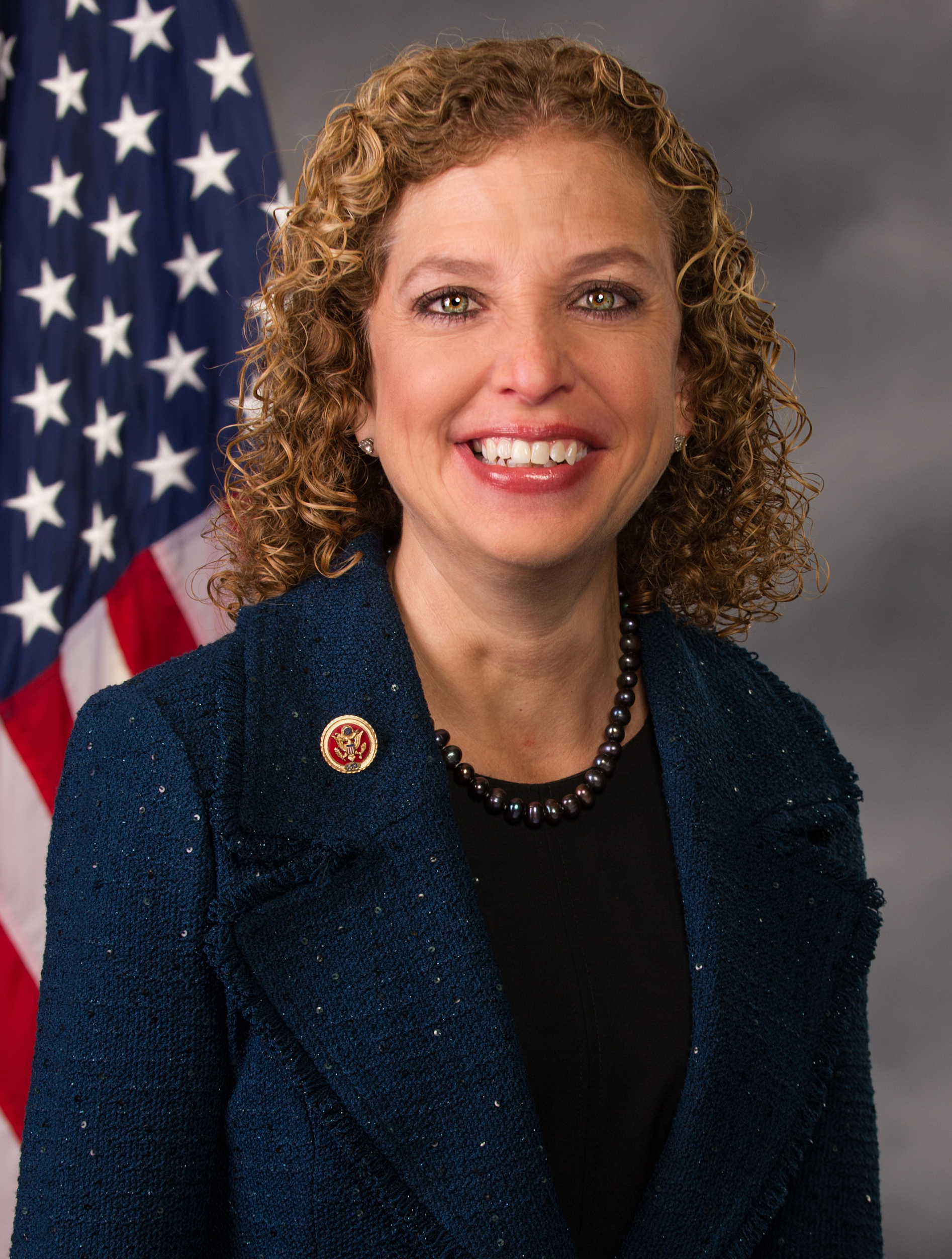
Candidate	Debbie Wasserman Schultz
Chair before election
Debbie Wasserman Schultz
Elected Chair
Debbie Wasserman Schultz

The 2013 Democratic National Committee chairmanship election was held at the Omni Shoreham Hotel in Washington, D.C. on January 22, 2013, at the party's winter meeting to determine the next chairperson of the Democratic National Committee (DNC). The chair election was uncontested, and Debbie Wasserman Schultz was reelected chairperson through a unanimous consent vote.

== Background ==
On April 5, 2011, President Barack Obama chose Debbie Wasserman Schultz as the 52nd chair of the Democratic National Committee (DNC), succeeding Tim Kaine, who was stepping down to run in the 2012 US Senate election in Virginia. Donna Brazile served as the interim DNC chair until Wasserman Schultz was confirmed at a DNC meeting on May 4, 2011, in Washington, D.C.

In 2012, many of Obama's advisers questioned whether to again select Wasserman Schultz as DNC chair, feeling she came across as too partisan on television. An internal focus study of the popularity of top Obama campaign surrogates ranked her at the bottom. Despite these concerns, President Obama ultimately chose to endorse Wasserman Schultz's continuation in her role as DNC chairperson.

== Results ==
Debbie Wasserman Schultz was re-elected uncontested as DNC chair via unanimous consent on January 22, 2013. Donna Brazile proposed the motion to suspend the rules and re-elect Wasserman Schultz by acclamation, which was then unanimously approved, forgoing a formal ballot.

== See also ==
- 2013 Republican National Committee chairmanship election
