= 2015 Republican National Committee chairmanship election =

American party leadership vote

- January 16, 2015
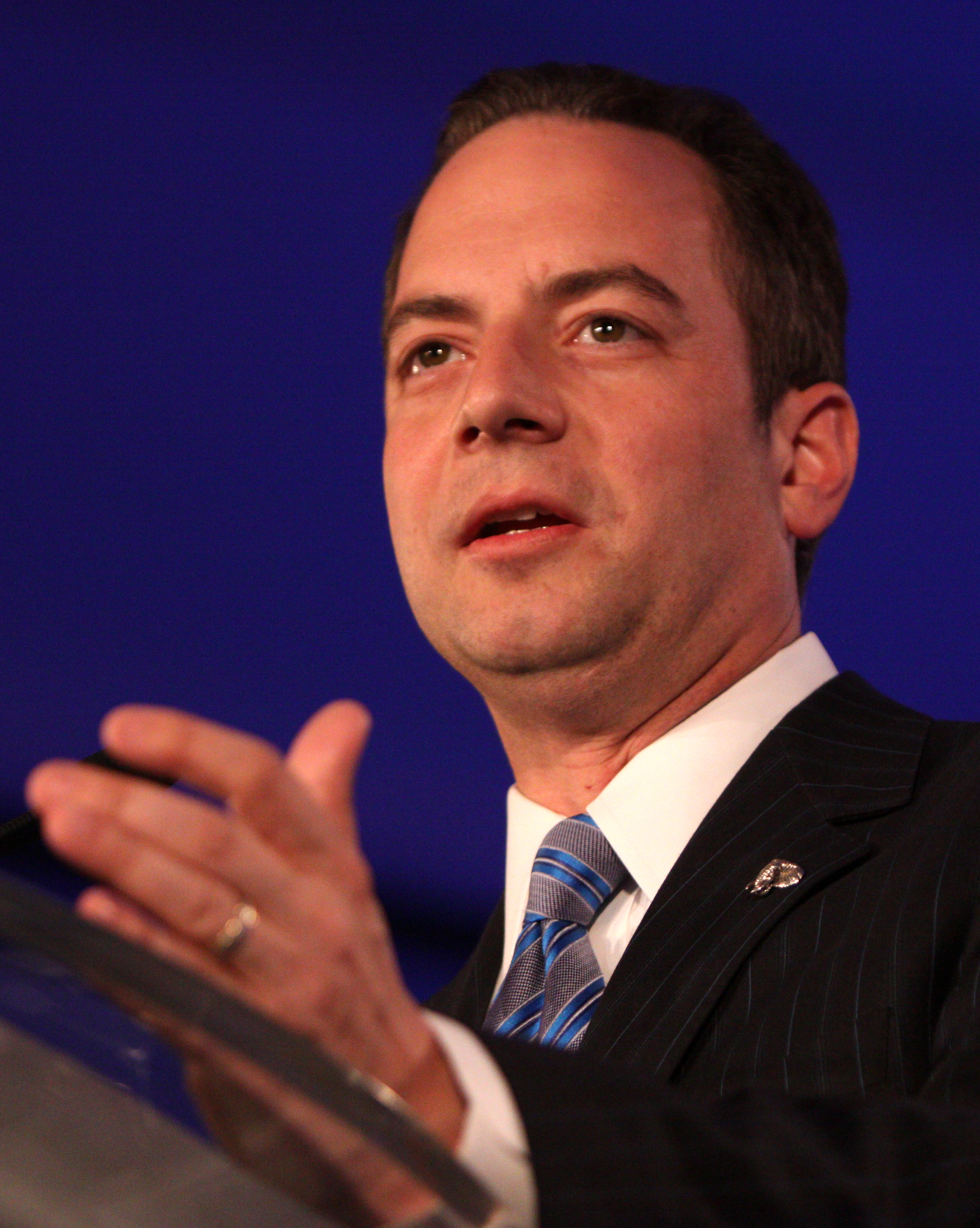
Candidate	Reince Priebus
Caucus vote	166
Percentage	98.8%
Chairman before election
Reince Priebus
Elected Chairman
Reince Priebus

The 2015 Republican National Committee (RNC) chairmanship election was held on January 16, 2015. Then-incumbent RNC Chairman Reince Priebus won re-election with near unanimity in the party's 2015 meeting, putting him on course to become the longest-serving head of the national party in history.

== Background ==
Reince Priebus first became RNC Chairman in 2011, following a competitive election. During his tenure, he emphasized modernizing the Republican Party's campaign infrastructure, improving voter outreach, and addressing the party's weaknesses identified in the aftermath of the 2012 presidential election. His leadership was instrumental in the development of the "Growth and Opportunity Project," a strategic review aimed at expanding the party's appeal to minority groups and younger voters.

== Election ==
The election took place during the RNC's annual winter meeting in San Diego, California. Priebus ran unopposed for re-election, reflecting widespread support within the party. He received 166 out of 168 votes, representing 98.8% of the total.

== Impact ==
Priebus's re-election positioned him to lead the RNC through the 2016 presidential election cycle. Under his guidance, the party focused on strengthening its digital and data-driven campaign strategies, which were credited with helping Republicans achieve significant gains in Congress during the 2014 midterm elections.

== Candidates ==
- Reince Priebus, then-incumbent RNC Chairman
