= Reinhart Boerner Van Deuren s.c. =

US-based law firm

== Firm History ==
William Kaumheimer started his law practice in Milwaukee in 1894. In 1919, he formed a partnership with Reginald Kenney, and the firm became Kaumheimer & Kenney. Mr. Kaumheimer was the president of the Milwaukee Bar Association in 1919 and 1920. In 1925, his son, Leon E. Kaumheimer, joined him, and Mr. Kenney left the firm. The firm was then renamed Kaumheimer & Kaumheimer. After William Kaumheimer died in 1938, the firm of Kaumheimer, Alt & Likert was established, and no new partners or associates joined until 1949. Jack Reinhart joined the firm in 1949, followed by Roger Boerner in 1954, and Richard Van Deuren and Richard Norris in 1956. In 1962, the firm changed its name to Kaumheimer, Reinhart, Boerner, Van Deuren & Norris.

In 1969, the firm incorporated as a service corporation and changed its name to Reinhart, Boerner, Van Deuren & Norris, s.c. In 1974, the firm added "Rieselbach" to its name.

Expansion, to Denver, came in 1985. Over the following years, further offices opened in Madison (1993); Waukesha, WI (2002); Rockford, IL (2005); Phoenix (2011); and Chicago (2012).
