= Mary Thompson-Jones =

American diplomat (born 1957)

Personal details
- Born: February 13, 1957 (age 69) Glendale, California, U.S.
- Spouse: Harold Y. Jones
- Children: 3
- Education: California State University, Tufts University, University of Pennsylvania
- Occupation: Foreign Service Officer

Mary Thompson-Jones (born February 13, 1957) is a retired senior Foreign Service Officer in the United States' Department of State. In July 2016, she published her first book, To The Secretary: Leaked Embassy Cables and America's Foreign Policy Disconnect.

== Education ==
Thompson-Jones holds Bachelor of Arts degrees in Journalism and Political Science from California State University. She has a Master of Arts in Law and Diplomacy from The Fletcher School of Law and Diplomacy at Tufts University, and a Doctor of Education from the University of Pennsylvania.

== Career ==
Before joining the Foreign Service she spent eight years as a journalist, primarily as an editorial writer, on daily newspapers including the Glandale News-Press, the Santa Monica Evening Outlook, the Los Angeles Daily News and the Providence Journal.

From August 2007 until January 2009, she served as Deputy Chief of Mission at the Embassy of the United States in Prague, Czech Republic, before stepping in as Chargé d'affaires in the absence of a congressionally approved Ambassador for the following two years of her appointment. She attained the rank of Minister-counselor while serving as chargé d'affaires in Prague, where her portfolio included missile defense negotiations, the Czech entry into the U.S. Visa Waiver Program, and the Czech Presidency of the European Union. She oversaw two visits from President Barack Obama, Secretary Hillary Clinton, several cabinet secretaries, and congressional delegations.

Following her departure from that post, she became the Diplomat in Residence for the New England Region in the United States. After serving as the Dean of International Relations at Endicott College for a year, she then moved to Northeastern University where she is currently the director of the Master of Science in Global Studies and International Affairs program. Her overseas assignments included work as Assistant Cultural Affairs Officer in Madrid; Press Attaché in Prague; Press Attaché in Sarajevo; Public Affairs Officer in Montreal; and Counselor for Public Affairs in Guatemala. She has been awarded three Meritorious Honor Awards for her overseas work.

In Washington D.C. she worked as Deputy Staff Director for the Public Diplomacy Advisory Commission, Senior Press Officer in the Bureau of European Affairs, Deputy Policy Coordinator for the Bureau of Western Hemisphere Affairs, and Branch Chief for International Educational Advising in the Bureau of Educational and Cultural Affairs.

== Family ==
She is married to Harold Y. Jones and is the mother of Andrea, Gareth and Gwyneth.

== Works ==
- Mary Thompson-Jones (12 July 2016). To the Secretary: Leaked Embassy Cables and America's Foreign Policy Disconnect. W. W. Norton. pp. 1–. ISBN 978-0-393-24659-9.,
