= RNC autopsy =

2013 Republic National Committee report

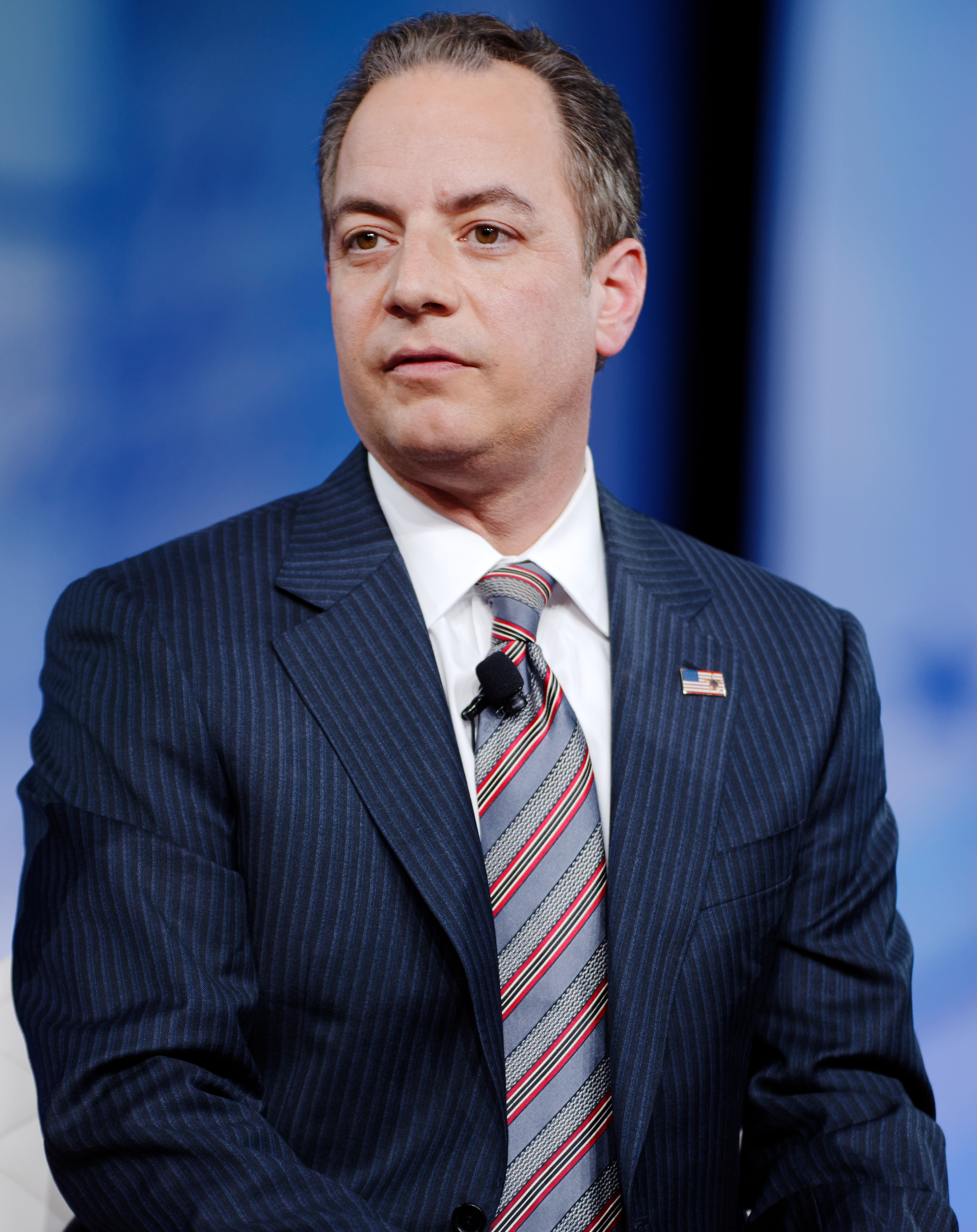
The Growth & Opportunity Project was ordered by RNC Chair Reince Priebus.

The Growth & Opportunity Project, commonly called the RNC autopsy, was a 2013 report created by the Republican National Committee (RNC) following incumbent Democratic President Barack Obama's victory over Republican candidate Mitt Romney in the 2012 United States presidential election. The report proposed reasons for the Republican Party lack of success in recent elections as well as recommendations for future campaigns and the direction of the party.

== Background ==
RNC Chairman Reince Priebus announced the Growth & Opportunity Project in December 2012, following Republican presidential candidate Mitt Romney's defeat to Democratic incumbent Barack Obama in the 2012 presidential election. The co-chairs of the project were Henry Barbour, Sally Bradshaw, Ari Fleischer, Zori Fonalledas, and Glenn McCall. To complete the report, the project conducted over 36,000 online surveys, over 3,000 group listening sessions, over 800 conference calls, and over 50 focus groups. The report was released during the National Press Club on March 18, 2013.

== Report ==
=== Messaging ===
The report found that Republican governors were far more successful in messaging and managing public perception than Republican congressmen. It also found that the party had become ideologically constrained, communicating only to people that agreed with the Republican platform. Concerns regarding messaging were raised, including the perception of apathy by the Republican Party and changing demographics that the party was not reaching. It recommended increased focus on criticizing big business and demonstrating concern for poorer Americans.

The report found that "the perception that the GOP does not care about people is doing great harm to the Party and its candidates on the federal level, especially in presidential years." It emphasized directing messaging toward Hispanic and Latino Americans when considering changing demographics, emphasizing the increasing Hispanic population in the United States and urging the party to limit its rhetoric on immigration policy. It also recommended appealing to younger voters by reducing social conservatism in the party.

=== Demographics partners ===
The report emphasized the importance of appealing to African-American, Latino, Asian, women, gay, and young voters, citing changing demographics and the increased skepticism these groups held toward the Republican Party. It warned that the increasing non-white population in the United States threatened to make elections more difficult for Republicans if the party did not attempt to reach these voters. It proposed a "Growth and Opportunity Inclusion Council" modeled after the New Majority Council implemented by the RNC in 1997.

=== Campaign mechanics ===
The report called for an update in how campaigns collect data and operate digitally. It called for increased investments and innovation in the area, and it proposed a digital "road show" to help Republican campaigns adopt better practices in data collection. Other changes in the campaign process it called for included how the party approached early and absentee voting, candidate recruitment, vendor selection, voter registration, polling, media placement, and communication with state parties.

=== Friends and allies ===
The report encouraged outside groups supporting Republicans to spend less on TV advertising, citing little change in polling after $1 billion of such spending. Another proposal was the creation of an opposition research organization that publishes damaging or inappropriate statements by Democrats. The report also proposed other changes in the activity of affiliated organizations, including their role in the primary process, use of technology, putting out information, polling, collaboration of allied organizations through the RNC, testing of campaign strategies, decentralization, voter registration, promoting the successes of governors, and ideological diversity.

=== Fundraising ===
The report called for expansion of low-dollar fundraising, digital fundraising, and direct marketing through mail and by phone. It also proposed the use of surrogates and fundraising training to assist smaller campaigns.

=== Campaign finance ===
The report called for campaign finance reform at the federal and state levels, expressing opposition to the Bipartisan Campaign Reform Act.

=== Primary process ===
The report recommended reform to presidential primary elections held by the Republican Party. It proposed reducing the number of debates from 20 down to 10 as well as holding the Republican National Convention earlier, in June or July. It also suggested restructuring the primary election process to move away from the "long, winding, often random" state-by-state sequence.

== Aftermath ==
Major outlets noted the strong stances taken by the report, with commentators describing it as "stunning", "bold", and "hard-headed". The College Republican National Committee released a similar report in June of 2013, reaching similar conclusions. The report was welcomed by party leaders such as Paul Ryan and Newt Gingrich. It met criticism from some Republicans who feared that the proposed changes to the primary process would make it more difficult for grassroots campaigns to compete.

After the report's release, the Republican Party incorporated some of its proposals, including increasing focus on digital technology, scheduling the 2016 Republican National Convention in July, and hiring staff to increase demographic outreach. The success of Donald Trump during the 2016 presidential primaries was seen as a rejection of the report's proposals. Trump had previously expressed dismay with the findings of the report, and his campaign disregarded the report's proposals in regard to immigration, inclusion, and rhetoric.

== See also ==
- DNC autopsy
- Mitt Romney 2012 presidential campaign
- Political demography
- Politics of the United States
- Project 2025
- Project for the New American Century
