= 2004 United States Senate elections =

- November 2, 2004
- Class 3

34 of the 100 seats in the United States Senate 51 seats needed for a majority
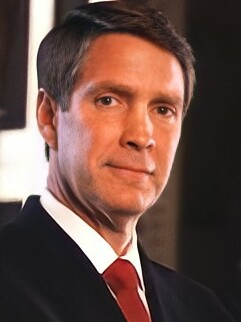

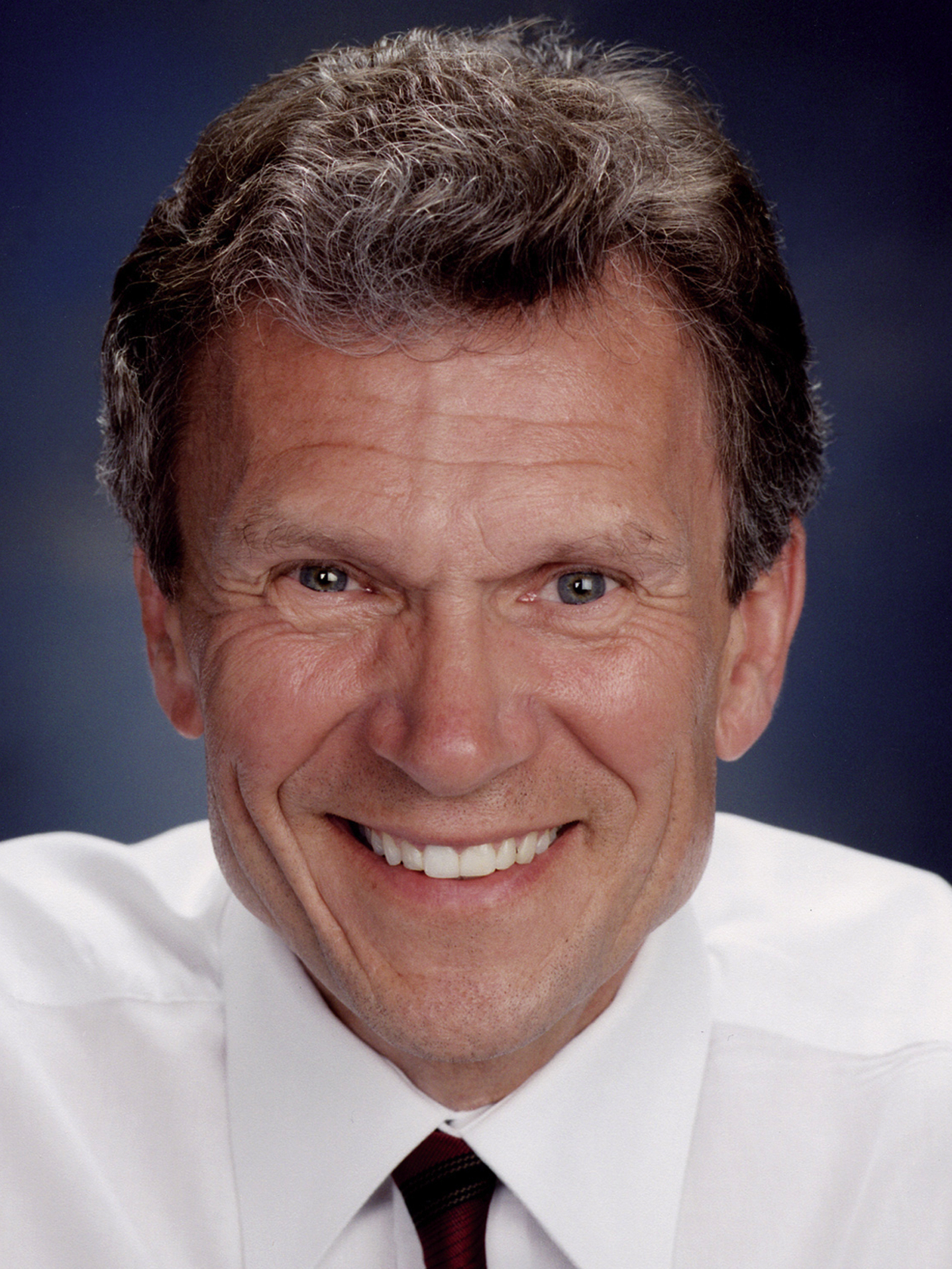
	Majority party	Minority party
Leader	Bill Frist	Tom Daschle (lost re-election)
Party	Republican	Democratic
Leader since	January 3, 2003	January 3, 1995
Leader's seat	Tennessee	South Dakota
Seats before	51	48
Seats after	55	44
Seat change	▲4	▼4
Popular vote	39,920,562	44,754,618
Percentage	45.3%	50.8%
Seats up	15	19
Races won	19	15
	Third party
Party	Independent
Seats before	1
Seats after	1
Seat change	Steady
Popular vote	186,231
Percentage	0.2%
Seats up	0
Races won	0
- Results of the elections: Democratic gain Democratic hold Republican gain Republican hold No election
Majority Leader before election
Bill Frist
Republican
Elected Majority Leader
Bill Frist
Republican

The 2004 United States Senate elections were held on November 2, 2004, with all Class 3 Senate seats being contested. They coincided with the re-election of George W. Bush as president and the United States House elections, as well as many state and local elections. Senators who were elected in 1998, known as Senate Class 3, were seeking re-election or retiring in 2004.

Republicans won six seats but lost two themselves, giving them a net gain of four seats. Five of the six gains came from states in the region of the Southern United States. Democrats Fritz Hollings of South Carolina, John Breaux of Louisiana, Bob Graham of Florida, and Zell Miller of Georgia chose to retire, while John Edwards of North Carolina chose to run for the Democratic nomination for president, and was subsequently selected as the Democratic nominee for vice president. They were succeeded by Republicans Jim DeMint, David Vitter, Mel Martinez, Johnny Isakson, and Richard Burr, respectively.

In South Dakota, Republican John Thune defeated the incumbent Senate minority leader Tom Daschle, marking the first and only time since 1952 that a sitting party leader lost re-election, as well as the only time that person was the minority leader. Republican senator Peter Fitzgerald of Illinois chose not to run for re-election, and Democrat (and future president) Barack Obama won in a landslide, becoming the Senate's only Black member and only the third popularly elected in American history and only the third elected since Reconstruction. Republican Senator Ben Nighthorse Campbell of Colorado chose not to run for re-election, and Democrat Ken Salazar won the open seat.

This was the third consecutive election cycle for Senate Class 3 in which the Democrats either broke even or lost seats. This also marked the first time since 1980 in which a presidential candidate from either party won with coattails in the Senate. Additionally, these election results are tied with those of 1996 and 1998 as the highest number of Senate seats that the Republicans have held since 1920. In contrast, when accounting for their gains in 2002, it was the last time that the Republicans made net gains in two election cycles in a row as of 2026. Republicans would not make a net gain of seats during a presidential election year again until 2024. This is the last time both major parties were on the general election ballot in every race. As of 2026, this is the most recent election cycle after which the Republican Party ended up with at least 55 Senate seats.

== Results summary ==
↓
44	1	55

Democratic	Independent	Republican

Summary of the 2004 United States Senate elections results

Parties							Total
Parties		Democratic	Republican	Independent	Libertarian	Others	Total
Before these elections		48	51	1	—	—	100
End of this Congress (two months later)		48	51	1	—	—	100
Not Up		29	36	1	—	—	66
Up		19	15	—	—	—	34
Incumbent retired	Total before	5	3	—	—	—	8
Incumbent retired	Held by same party	—	1	—	—	—	1
Incumbent retired	Replaced by other party	▼2 Republicans replaced by ▲2 Democrats ▼5 Democrats replaced by ▲5 Republicans		—	—	—	7
Incumbent retired	Result after	2	6	—	—	—	8
Incumbent ran	Total before	14	12 (Note: Includes the interim appointee ran for election.)	—	—	—	26
Incumbent ran	Won re-election	13	12	—	—	—	25
Incumbent ran	Lost re-election	▼1 Democrat replaced by ▲1 Republican		—	—	—	1
Incumbent ran	Lost renomination, held by same party	—	—	—	—	—	0
Incumbent ran	Lost renomination, and party lost	—	—	—	—	—	0
Incumbent ran	Result after	13	13	—	—	—	26
Net gain/loss		▼4	▲4	—	—	—	4
Total elected		15	19	—	—	—	34
Result		44	55	1	—	—	100
Popular vote	Votes	44,754,618	39,920,562	186,231	754,861	2,481,075	88,097,347
Popular vote	Share	50.80%	45.31%	0.21%	0.86%	2.82%	100%

Sources:

- Dave Leip's Atlas of U.S. Elections
- United States Elections Project at George Mason University

== Change in composition ==
=== Before the elections ===
D_{1}	D_{2}	D_{3}	D_{4}	D_{5}	D_{6}	D_{7}	D_{8}	D_{9}	D_{10}
D_{20}	D_{19}	D_{18}	D_{17}	D_{16}	D_{15}	D_{14}	D_{13}	D_{12}	D_{11}
D_{21}	D_{22}	D_{23}	D_{24}	D_{25}	D_{26}	D_{27}	D_{28}	D_{29}	D_{30} Ark. Ran
D_{40} S.Dak. Ran	D_{39} Ore. Ran	D_{38} N.Dak. Ran	D_{37} N.Y. Ran	D_{36} Nev. Ran	D_{35} Md. Ran	D_{34} Ind. Ran	D_{33} Hawaii; Ran	D_{32} Conn. Ran	D_{31} Calif. Ran
D_{41} Vt. Ran	D_{42} Wash. Ran	D_{43} Wisc. Ran	D_{44} Fla. Retired	D_{45} Ga. Retired	D_{46} La. Retired	D_{47} N.C. Retired	D_{48} S.C. Retired	I_{1}	R_{51} Okla. Retired
Majority →									R_{51} Okla. Retired
R_{41} Iowa; Ran	R_{42} Kans. Ran	R_{43} Ky. Ran	R_{44} Mo. Ran	R_{45} N.H. Ran	R_{46} Ohio; Ran	R_{47} Pa. Ran	R_{48} Utah; Ran	R_{49} Colo. Retired	R_{50} Ill. Retired
R_{40} Idaho; Ran	R_{39} Ariz. Ran	R_{38} Alaska; Ran	R_{37} Ala. Ran	R_{36}	R_{35}	R_{34}	R_{33}	R_{32}	R_{31}
R_{21}	R_{22}	R_{23}	R_{24}	R_{25}	R_{26}	R_{27}	R_{28}	R_{29}	R_{30}
R_{20}	R_{19}	R_{18}	R_{17}	R_{16}	R_{15}	R_{14}	R_{13}	R_{12}	R_{11}
R_{1}	R_{2}	R_{3}	R_{4}	R_{5}	R_{6}	R_{7}	R_{8}	R_{9}	R_{10}

=== After the elections ===
D_{1}	D_{2}	D_{3}	D_{4}	D_{5}	D_{6}	D_{7}	D_{8}	D_{9}	D_{10}
D_{20}	D_{19}	D_{18}	D_{17}	D_{16}	D_{15}	D_{14}	D_{13}	D_{12}	D_{11}
D_{21}	D_{22}	D_{23}	D_{24}	D_{25}	D_{26}	D_{27}	D_{28}	D_{29}	D_{30} Ark. Re-elected
D_{40} Vt. Re-elected	D_{39} Ore. Re-elected	D_{38} N.Dak. Re-elected	D_{37} N.Y. Re-elected	D_{36} Nev. Re-elected	D_{35} Md. Re-elected	D_{34} Ind. Re-elected	D_{33} Hawaii; Re-elected	D_{32} Conn. Re-elected	D_{31} Calif. Re-elected
D_{41} Wash. Re-elected	D_{42} Wisc. Re-elected	D_{43} Colo. Gain	D_{44} Ill. Gain	I_{1}	R_{55} S.Dak. Gain	R_{54} S.C. Gain	R_{53} N.C. Gain	R_{52} La. Gain	R_{51} Ga. Gain
Majority →									R_{51} Ga. Gain
R_{41} Iowa; Re-elected	R_{42} Kans. Re-elected	R_{43} Ky. Re-elected	R_{44} Mo. Re-elected	R_{45} N.H. Re-elected	R_{46} Ohio; Re-elected	R_{47} Okla. Hold	R_{48} Pa. Re-elected	R_{49} Utah; Re-elected	R_{50} Fla. Gain
R_{40} Idaho; Re-elected	R_{39} Ariz. Re-elected	R_{38} Alaska; Elected (Note: Appointee elected)	R_{37} Ala. Re-elected	R_{36}	R_{35}	R_{34}	R_{33}	R_{32}	R_{31}
R_{21}	R_{22}	R_{23}	R_{24}	R_{25}	R_{26}	R_{27}	R_{28}	R_{29}	R_{30}
R_{20}	R_{19}	R_{18}	R_{17}	R_{16}	R_{15}	R_{14}	R_{13}	R_{12}	R_{11}
R_{1}	R_{2}	R_{3}	R_{4}	R_{5}	R_{6}	R_{7}	R_{8}	R_{9}	R_{10}

Key:

D_{#}	Democratic
I_{#}	Independent
R_{#}	Republican

== Gains and losses ==
=== Retirements ===
Map of retirements: Republican incumbent Democratic incumbent Democratic incumbent retired Republican incumbent retired

Three Republicans and five Democrats retired instead of seeking re-election.

State	Senator	Age at end of term	Assumed office	Replaced by
Colorado	Ben Nighthorse Campbell	71	1993	Ken Salazar
Florida	Bob Graham	68	1987	Mel Martínez
Georgia	Zell Miller	72	2000 (Note: Appointed to the seat following the death of Paul Coverdell.)	Johnny Isakson
Illinois	Peter Fitzgerald	44	1999	Barack Obama
Louisiana	John Breaux	60	1987	David Vitter
North Carolina	John Edwards	51	1999	Richard Burr
Oklahoma	Don Nickles	56	1981	Tom Coburn
South Carolina	Fritz Hollings	83	1966 (Note: Elected in the special election to finish Olin D. Johnston's term.)	Jim DeMint

=== Defeats ===
Despite several candidates being in danger of losing their re-election bid, South Dakota Democratic senator Tom Daschle was the only incumbent who ran for re-election to be defeated.

State	Senator	Age at end of term	Assumed office	Replaced by	Ref
South Dakota	Tom Daschle	57	1987	John Thune	

=== Post-election changes ===
One Democrat resigned on January 17, 2006, and was replaced by a Democratic appointee.

State	Senator	Replaced by
New Jersey (Class 1)	Jon Corzine	Bob Menendez

== Final pre-election predictions ==
Several sites and individuals publish predictions of competitive seats. These predictions look at factors such as the strength of the incumbent (if the incumbent is running for re-election) and the other candidates, and the state's partisan lean (reflected in part by the state's Cook Partisan Voting Index rating). The predictions assign ratings to each seat, indicating the predicted advantage that a party has in winning that seat.

Most election predictors used:

- "tossup": no advantage
- "tilt" (used by some predictors): advantage that is not quite as strong as "lean"
- "lean": slight advantage
- "likely" or "favored": significant, but surmountable, advantage
- "safe" or "solid": near-certain chance of victory

Where a site gives a percentage probability as its primary indicator of expected outcome, the chart below classifies a race as follows:

- Tossup: 50-55%
- Tilt: 56-60%
- Lean: 61-75%
- Likely: 76-93%
- Safe: 94-100%

Constituency	Incumbent		2004 election ratings	
State	Senator	Last election (Note: The last elections for this group of senators were in 1998, except for those elected in a special election or who were appointed after the resignation or passing of a sitting senator, as noted.)	Sabato's Crystal Ball Nov. 1 2004	Result
Alabama	Richard Shelby	63.24% R	Safe R	Shelby; 67.55% R
Alaska	Lisa Murkowski	Appointed (2002) (Note: Republican Frank Murkowski won in 1998 with 74.49% of the vote, but resigned on December 2, 2002, after having won the election as Governor of Alaska.)	Lean D (flip)	Murkowski; 48.58% R
Arizona	John McCain	68.74% R	Safe R	McCain; 76.74% R
Arkansas	Blanche Lincoln	55.07% D	Safe D	Lincoln; 55.90% D
California	Barbara Boxer	53.06% D	Safe D	Boxer; 57.71% D
Colorado	Ben Nighthorse Campbell (retired)	62.49% R	Lean D (flip)	Salazar; 51.30% D (flip)
Connecticut	Chris Dodd	65.15% D	Safe D	Dodd; 66.35% D
Florida	Bob Graham (retired)	62.47% D	Lean R (flip)	Martínez; 49.43% R (flip)
Georgia	Zell Miller (retired)	58.19% D (2000 special) (Note: Republican Paul Coverdell won in 1998 with 52.37% of the vote, but died on July 18, 2000.)	Safe R (flip)	Isakson; 57.88% R (flip)
Hawaii	Daniel Inouye	79.18% D	Safe D	Inouye; 75.51% D
Idaho	Mike Crapo	69.54% R	Safe R	Crapo; 99.18% R
Illinois	Peter Fitzgerald (retired)	50.35% R	Safe D (flip)	Obama; 69.97% D (flip)
Indiana	Evan Bayh	63.72% D	Safe D	Bayh; 61.65% D
Iowa	Chuck Grassley	68.41% R	Safe R	Grassley; 70.18% R
Kansas	Sam Brownback	65.27% R	Safe R	Brownback; 69.16% R
Kentucky	Jim Bunning	49.75% R	Lean R	Bunning; 50.66% R
Louisiana	John Breaux (retired)	64.02% D	Lean R (flip)	Vitter; 51.03% R (flip)
Maryland	Barbara Mikulski	70.50% D	Safe D	Mikulski; 64.80% D
Missouri	Kit Bond	52.68% R	Safe R	Bond; 56.09% R
Nevada	Harry Reid	47.86% D	Safe D	Reid; 61.08% D
New Hampshire	Judd Gregg	67.84% R	Safe R	Gregg; 66.24% R
New York	Chuck Schumer	54.62% D	Safe D	Schumer; 71.16% D
North Carolina	John Edwards (retired)	51.15% D	Lean R (flip)	Burr; 51.60% R (flip)
North Dakota	Byron Dorgan	63.16% D	Safe D	Dorgan; 68.28% D
Ohio	George Voinovich	56.46% R	Safe R	Voinovich; 63.85% R
Oklahoma	Don Nickles (retired)	66.38% R	Lean R	Coburn; 52.77% R
Oregon	Ron Wyden	61.05% D	Safe D	Wyden; 63.39% D
Pennsylvania	Arlen Specter	61.34% R	Safe R	Specter; 52.62% R
South Carolina	Fritz Hollings (retired)	52.70% D	Likely R (flip)	DeMint; 53.67% R (flip)
South Dakota	Tom Daschle	62.14% D	Lean R (flip)	Thune; 50.58% R (flip)
Utah	Bob Bennett	63.98% R	Safe R	Bennett; 68.73% R
Vermont	Patrick Leahy	72.22% D	Safe D	Leahy; 70.63% D
Washington	Patty Murray	58.41% D	Likely D	Murray; 54.98% D
Wisconsin	Russ Feingold	50.55% D	Safe D	Feingold; 55.35% D

== Race summary ==
=== Special elections during the 108th Congress ===
There were no special elections during the 108th Congress.

=== Elections leading to the next Congress ===
In these general elections, the winners were elected for the term beginning January 3, 2005; ordered by state.

All of the elections involved the Class 3 seats.

State	Incumbent			Results	Candidates
State	Senator	Party	Electoral history	Results	Candidates
Alabama	Richard Shelby	Republican	1986 (Note: Shelby was first elected in 1986 and re-elected in 1992 as a Democrat. He switched parties in 1994.); 1992; 1998	Incumbent re-elected.	▌ ✓ Richard Shelby (Republican) 68%; ▌Wayne Sowell (Democratic) 32%
Alaska	Lisa Murkowski	Republican	2002 (appointed)	Interim appointee elected.	▌ ✓ Lisa Murkowski (Republican) 48.6%; ▌Tony Knowles (Democratic) 45.5%; ▌Marc Millican (Independent) 2.9%; Others: ▌Jerry Sanders (AKIP) 1.2%; ▌Jim Sykes (Green) 1.0%; ▌Scott Kohlhaas (Libertarian) 0.4%
Arizona	John McCain	Republican	1986; 1992; 1998	Incumbent re-elected.	▌ ✓ John McCain (Republican) 76%; ▌Stuart Starky (Democratic) 21%; ▌Ernest Hancock (Libertarian) 3%
Arkansas	Blanche Lincoln	Democratic	1998	Incumbent re-elected.	▌ ✓ Blanche Lincoln (Democratic) 56%; ▌Jim Holt (Republican) 44%
California	Barbara Boxer	Democratic	1992; 1998	Incumbent re-elected.	▌ ✓ Barbara Boxer (Democratic) 57.7%; ▌Bill Jones (Republican) 37.8%; Others: ▌Marsha Feinland (Peace and Freedom) 2.0%; ▌Jim Gray (Libertarian) 1.8%; ▌Don J. Grundmann (Constitution) 0.7%
Colorado	Ben Nighthorse Campbell	Republican	1992 (Note: Campbell was first elected in 1992 as a Democrat. He switched parties in 1995.); 1998	Incumbent retired. Democratic gain.	▌ ✓ Ken Salazar (Democratic) 51.3%; ▌Pete Coors (Republican) 46.5%; Others: ▌Doug Cambell (Constitution) 1%; ▌Richard Randall (Libertarian) 0.5%; ▌John Harris (Independent) 0.4%; ▌Victor Good (Reform) 0.3%
Connecticut	Chris Dodd	Democratic	1980; 1986; 1992; 1998	Incumbent re-elected.	▌ ✓ Chris Dodd (Democratic) 66.4%; ▌Jack Orchulli (Republican) 32.1%; Others: ▌Timothy Knibbs (Constitution) 0.9%; ▌Lenny Rasch (Libertarian) 0.6%
Florida	Bob Graham	Democratic	1986; 1992; 1998	Incumbent retired. Republican gain.	▌ ✓ Mel Martínez (Republican) 49.5%; ▌Betty Castor (Democratic) 48.3%; ▌Dennis Bradley (Veterans) 2.2%
Georgia	Zell Miller	Democratic	2000 (appointed); 2000 (special)	Incumbent retired. Republican gain.	▌ ✓ Johnny Isakson (Republican) 57.9%; ▌Denise Majette (Democratic) 40%; ▌Allen Buckley (Libertarian) 2.1%
Hawaii	Daniel Inouye	Democratic	1962; 1968; 1974; 1980; 1986; 1992; 1998	Incumbent re-elected.	▌ ✓ Daniel Inouye (Democratic) 75.5%; ▌Campbell Cavasso (Republican) 21%; Others: ▌James Brewer (Independent) 2.2%; ▌Lloyd Mallan (Libertarian) 1.3%
Idaho	Mike Crapo	Republican	1998	Incumbent re-elected.	▌ ✓ Mike Crapo (Republican) 99.2%; ▌Scott McClure (Democratic write-in) 0.8%
Illinois	Peter Fitzgerald	Republican	1998	Incumbent retired. Democratic gain.	▌ ✓ Barack Obama (Democratic) 70.0%; ▌Alan Keyes (Republican) 27.0%; Others: ▌Albert Franzen (Independent) 1.6%; ▌Jerry Kohn (Libertarian) 1.3%
Indiana	Evan Bayh	Democratic	1998	Incumbent re-elected.	▌ ✓ Evan Bayh (Democratic) 62%; ▌Marvin Scott (Republican) 37%; ▌Albert Barger (Libertarian) 1%
Iowa	Chuck Grassley	Republican	1980; 1986; 1992; 1998	Incumbent re-elected.	▌ ✓ Chuck Grassley (Republican) 70.1%; ▌Arthur Small (Democratic) 27.9%; Others: ▌Christy Welty (Libertarian) 1.0%; ▌Daryl Northrop (Green) 0.8%; ▌Edwin Fruit (Socialist Workers) 0.1%
Kansas	Sam Brownback	Republican	1996 (special); 1998	Incumbent re-elected.	▌ ✓ Sam Brownback (Republican) 69%; ▌Lee Jones (Democratic) 28%; ▌Stephen A. Rosile (Libertarian) 2%; ▌George Cook (Reform) 1%
Kentucky	Jim Bunning	Republican	1998	Incumbent re-elected.	▌ ✓ Jim Bunning (Republican) 51%; ▌Daniel Mongiardo (Democratic) 49%
Louisiana	John Breaux	Democratic	1986; 1992; 1998	Incumbent retired. Republican gain.	▌ ✓ David Vitter (Republican) 51%; ▌Chris John (Democratic) 29%; ▌John Kennedy (Democratic) 15%; ▌Arthur Morrell (Democratic) 3%; Others: ▌Richard Fontanesi (Independent) 1%; ▌R. A. Galan (Independent) 1%; ▌Sam Melton (Democratic) 1%
Maryland	Barbara Mikulski	Democratic	1986; 1992; 1998	Incumbent re-elected.	▌ ✓ Barbara Mikulski (Democratic) 64.8%; ▌E. J. Pipkin (Republican) 33.7%; Others: ▌Maria Allwine (Green) 1.1%; ▌Thomas Trump (Constitution) 0.4%
Missouri	Kit Bond	Republican	1986; 1992; 1998	Incumbent re-elected.	▌ ✓ Kit Bond (Republican) 56%; ▌Nancy Farmer (Democratic) 42.8%; Others: ▌Kevin Tull (Libertarian) 0.7%; ▌Don Griffin (Constitution) 0.4%
Nevada	Harry Reid	Democratic	1986; 1992; 1998	Incumbent re-elected.	▌ ✓ Harry Reid (Democratic) 61.1%; ▌Richard Ziser (Republican) 35.1%; Others: None of These Candidates 1.6%; ▌Tomas Hurst (Libertarian) 1.2%; ▌David Schumann (Constitution) 0.7%; ▌Gary Marinch (Natural Law) 0.3%
New Hampshire	Judd Gregg	Republican	1992; 1998	Incumbent re-elected.	▌ ✓ Judd Gregg (Republican) 66%; ▌Doris Haddock (Democratic) 34%
New York	Chuck Schumer	Democratic	1998	Incumbent re-elected.	▌ ✓ Chuck Schumer (Democratic) 71.2%; ▌Howard Mills III (Republican) 24.2%; ▌Marilyn O'Grady (Conservative) 3.0%; Others: ▌David McReynolds (Green) 0.5%; ▌Donald Silberger (Libertarian) 0.3%; ▌Abraham Hirschfeld (Builders) 0.2%; ▌Martin Koppel (Socialist Workers) 0.2%
North Carolina	John Edwards	Democratic	1998	Incumbent retired to run for Vice President. Republican gain.	▌ ✓ Richard Burr (Republican) 52%; ▌Erskine Bowles (Democratic) 47%; ▌Tom Bailey (Libertarian) 1%
North Dakota	Byron Dorgan	Democratic-NPL	1992; 1998	Incumbent re-elected.	▌ ✓ Byron Dorgan (Democratic-NPL) 68%; ▌Mike Liffrig (Republican) 32%
Ohio	George Voinovich	Republican	1998	Incumbent re-elected.	▌ ✓ George Voinovich (Republican) 63.9%; ▌Eric Fingerhut (Democratic) 36.1%
Oklahoma	Don Nickles	Republican	1980; 1986; 1992; 1998	Incumbent retired. Republican hold.	▌ ✓ Tom Coburn (Republican) 52.8%; ▌Brad Carson (Democratic) 41.2%; ▌Sheila Bilyeu (Independent) 6.0%
Oregon	Ron Wyden	Democratic	1996 (special); 1998	Incumbent re-elected.	▌ ✓ Ron Wyden (Democratic) 63.4%; ▌Al King (Republican) 31.8%; Others: ▌Teresa Keane (Pacific Green) 2.4%; ▌Dan Fitzgerald (Libertarian) 1.7%; ▌David Brownlow (Constitution) 0.7%
Pennsylvania	Arlen Specter	Republican	1980; 1986; 1992; 1998	Incumbent re-elected.	▌ ✓ Arlen Specter (Republican) 52.6%; ▌Joe Hoeffel (Democratic) 42.0%; ▌Jim Clymer (Constitution) 4.0%; ▌Betsy Summers (Libertarian) 1.4%
South Carolina	Fritz Hollings	Democratic	1966 (special); 1968; 1974; 1980; 1986; 1992; 1998	Incumbent retired. Republican gain.	▌ ✓ Jim DeMint (Republican) 53.7%; ▌Inez Tenenbaum (Democratic) 44.1%; Others: ▌Patrick Tyndall (Constitution) 0.8%; ▌Rebekah Sutherland (Libertarian) 0.7%; ▌Tee Ferguson (United Citizens) 0.4%; ▌Efia Nwangaza (Green) 0.3%
South Dakota	Tom Daschle	Democratic	1986; 1992; 1998	Incumbent lost re-election. Republican gain.	▌ ✓ John Thune (Republican) 50.5%; ▌Tom Daschle (Democratic) 49.4%
Utah	Bob Bennett	Republican	1992; 1998	Incumbent re-elected.	▌ ✓ Bob Bennett (Republican) 68.7%; ▌Paul Van Dam (Democratic) 28.4%; Others: ▌Gary R. Van Horn (Constitution) 1.9%; ▌Joe Labonte (Personal Choice) 1%
Vermont	Patrick Leahy	Democratic	1974; 1980; 1986; 1992; 1998	Incumbent re-elected.	▌ ✓ Patrick Leahy (Democratic) 70.6%; ▌John A. McMullen (Republican) 24.5%; Others: ▌Cris Ericson (Marijuana) 2.1%; ▌Craig Hill (Green) 1.3%; ▌Keith Stern (Independent) 1.1%; ▌Ben Mitchell (Liberty Union) 0.3%
Washington	Patty Murray	Democratic	1992; 1998	Incumbent re-elected.	▌ ✓ Patty Murray (Democratic) 55%; ▌George Nethercutt (Republican) 42.7%; Others: ▌J. Mills (Libertarian) 1.2%; ▌Mark Wilson (Green) 1.1%
Wisconsin	Russ Feingold	Democratic	1992; 1998	Incumbent re-elected.	▌ ✓ Russ Feingold (Democratic) 55.4%; ▌Tim Michels (Republican) 44.1%; Others: ▌Arif Khan (Libertarian) 0.3%; ▌Eugene A. Hem (Independent) 0.2%

== Closest races ==
In seven races the margin of victory was under 10%.

District	Winner	Margin
Florida	Republican (flip)	1.1%
South Dakota	Republican (flip)	1.2%
Kentucky	Republican	1.4%
Alaska	Republican	3.0%
Colorado	Democratic (flip)	3.9%
North Carolina	Republican (flip)	4.6%
South Carolina	Republican (flip)	9.6% (Note: South Carolina was the "tipping point" state.)

== Alabama ==
Alabama Election
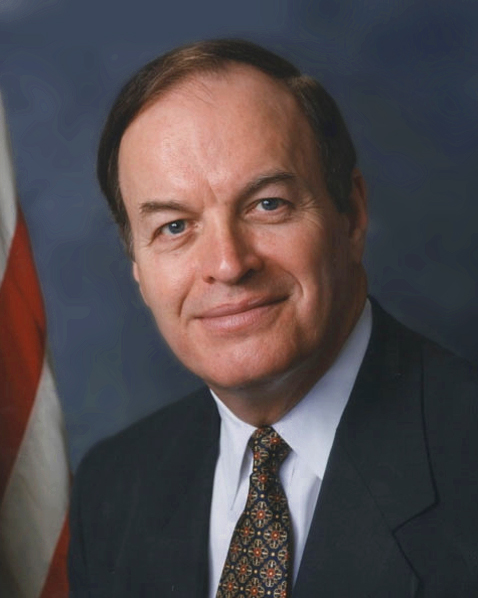
Nominee	Richard Shelby	Wayne Sowell
Party	Republican	Democratic
Popular vote	1,242,200	595,018
Percentage	67.6%	32.4%
- County results Shelby: 50–60% 60–70% 70–80% 80–90% Sowell: 50–60% 60–70% 70–80%
U.S. senator before election
Richard Shelby
Republican
Elected U.S. Senator
Richard Shelby
Republican

Incumbent Republican Richard Shelby won re-election to a fourth term over Democratic perennial candidate Wayne Sowell.

Shelby, who switched parties ten years prior, had over $11 million cash on hand. Shelby was chairman of the Banking Committee. Wayne Sowell became the first Black U.S. Senate nominee of a major party in Alabama.

Alabama general election
Party	Candidate	Votes	%
Republican	Richard Shelby (incumbent)	1,242,038	67.6
Democratic	Wayne Sowell	594,439	32.4
Independent	Write Ins	1,848	0.1
Total votes		1,836,477	100.0
Turnout			N/A

== Alaska ==
Alaska Election
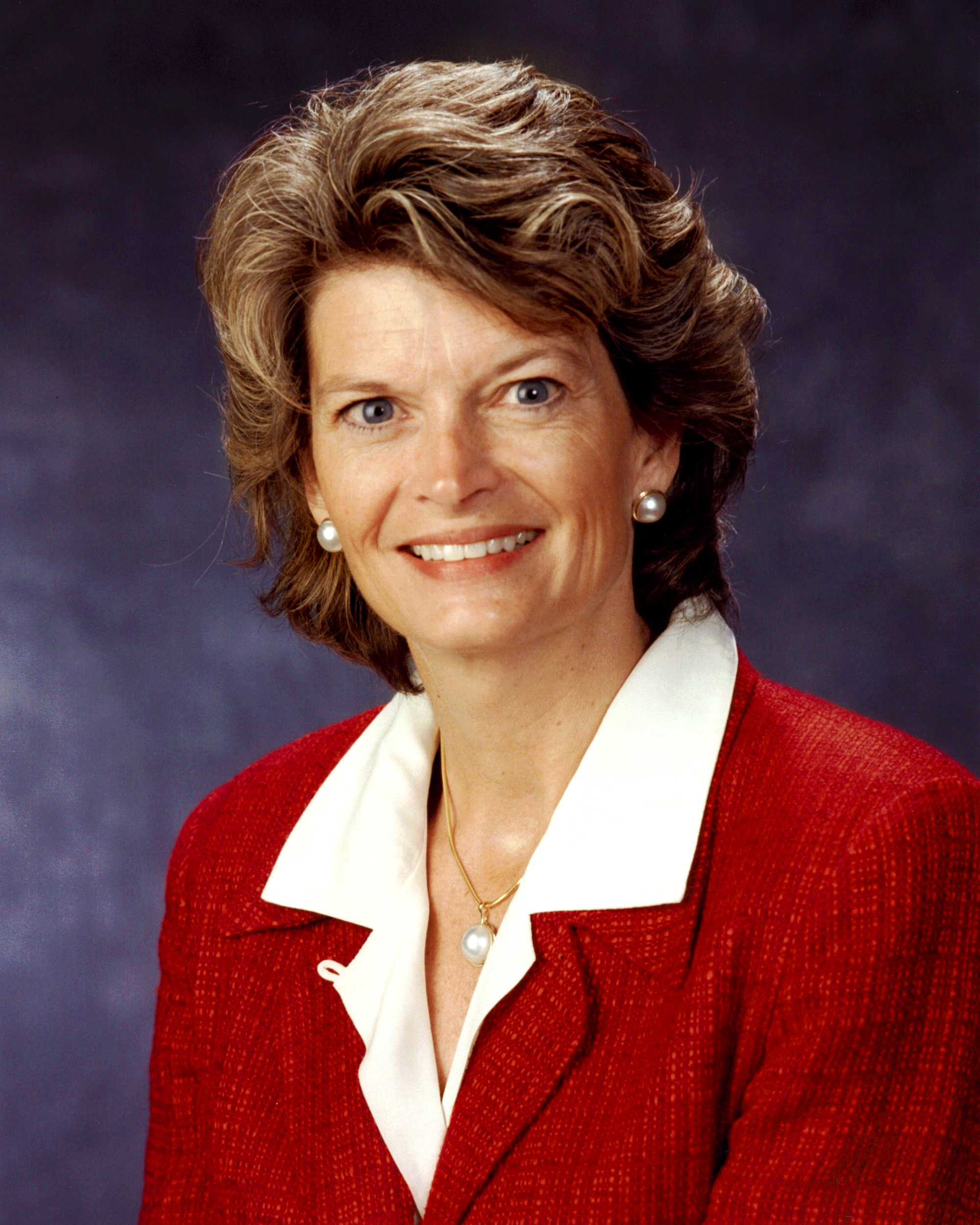

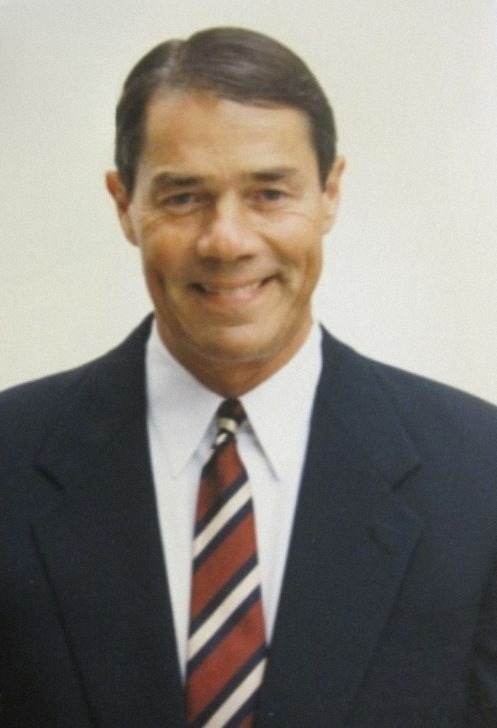
Nominee	Lisa Murkowski	Tony Knowles
Party	Republican	Democratic
Popular vote	149,773	140,424
Percentage	48.9%	45.5%
- Results by borough and census area Murkowski: 40–50% 50–60% 60–70% 70–80% Knowles: 40–50% 50–60% 60–70% 70–80%
U.S. senator before election
Lisa Murkowski
Republican
Elected U.S. Senator
Lisa Murkowski
Republican

Incumbent Republican Lisa Murkowski of Anchorage sought election to her first full term after being appointed to serve out the rest of her father, Frank Murkowski, on his unexpired term when he resigned in December 2002 to become governor of Alaska. Her main challenger was Democratic former governor Tony Knowles, her father's predecessor as governor. The younger Murkowski won by a slight margin.

Although Alaska is heavily Republican, popular opinion had swung against the Murkowski family because of a tax increase passed by Governor Frank Murkowski. In addition, multiple voters disapproved of apparent nepotism in the appointment of Lisa Murkowski to the Senate. Knowles, who as mentioned above preceded the elder Murkowski as governor, had enlisted extensive out-of-state support for his bid to take over the younger Murkowski's Senate seat. However, veteran Republican senator Ted Stevens taped advertisements warning Alaskans that electing a Democrat could result in less federal dollars for Alaska.

Democratic primary
Party	Candidate	Votes	%
Democratic	Tony Knowles	40,881	95.0
Democratic	Don Wright	1,080	2.5
Democratic	Theresa Obermeyer	1,045	2.4
Total votes		43,006	100.0

Republican primary
Party	Candidate	Votes	%
Republican	Lisa Murkowski (incumbent)	45,710	58.1
Republican	Mike Miller	29,313	37.3
Republican	Wev Shea	2,857	3.6
Republican	Jim Dore	748	0.9
Total votes		78,628	100.0

Lisa Murkowski had low approval ratings as senator due to her father, who at the time was the governor of Alaska with extremely low approval ratings himself. Former governor Tony Knowles ran against the younger Murkowski. He ran as a Democrat who supported drilling in ANWR, in contrast to most Democrats. Ted Stevens tried to "rescue" her campaign and help her maintain her seat.

Alaska general election
Party	Candidate	Votes	%	±%
Republican	Lisa Murkowski (incumbent)	149,773	48.58	−25.91%
Democratic	Tony Knowles	140,424	45.55	+25.82%
Independent	Marc J. Millican	8,885	2.88	
Independence	Jerry Sanders	3,785	1.23	
Green	Jim Sykes	3,053	0.99	2.22%
Libertarian	Scott A. Kohlhaas	1,240	0.40	−1.87%
Independent	Ted Gianoutsas	732	0.24	
Write-ins		423	0.14	
Majority		9,349	3.03	−51.74%
Turnout		308,315		

== Arizona ==
Arizona Election
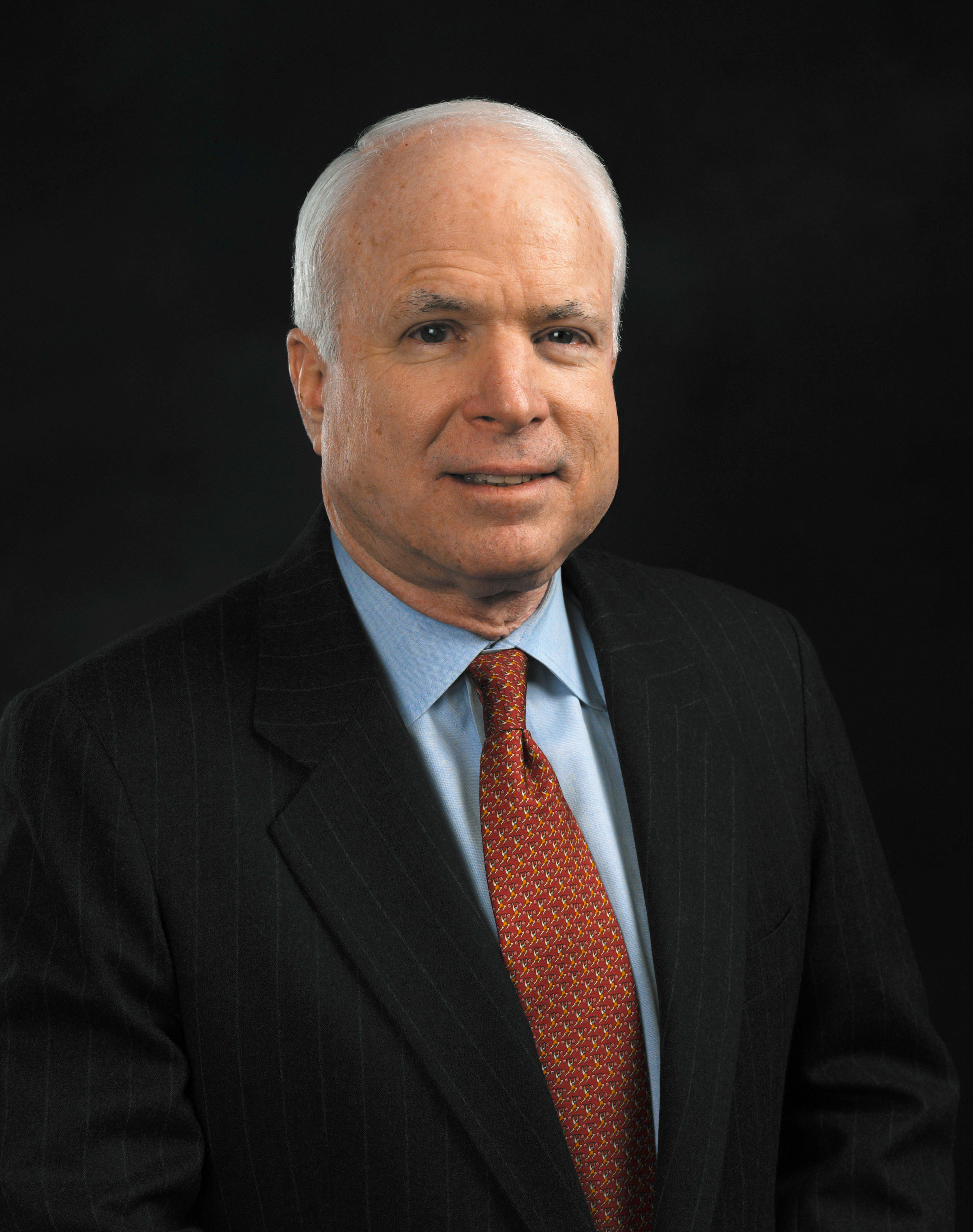
Nominee	John McCain	Stuart Starky
Party	Republican	Democratic
Popular vote	1,505,372	404,507
Percentage	76.7%	20.6%
- County results McCain: 50–60% 60–70% 70–80%
U.S. senator before election
John McCain
Republican
Elected U.S. Senator
John McCain
Republican

Incumbent Republican John McCain won re-election to a fourth term with his largest victory over Democratic teacher Stuart Starky.

In 1998, McCain challenged Texas governor George W. Bush in the presidential primary, and despite winning the New Hampshire primary, he lost the nomination. Solidifying his image as a maverick, he voted against the Bush tax cuts. He supported limits on stem cell research. He had a lopsided favorable rating of 39% to 9% unfavorable in the most recent The New York Times/CBS News poll.

Stuart Starky, an eighth-grade teacher in South Phoenix, was widely known as a long-shot challenger. Starky stated, "I truly believe he's going to run for president again." Starky was called by The Arizona Republic a "sacrificial lamb" put on the ballot because there was no chance to beat McCain. During his campaign, he debated McCain twice, once in Tucson and once in Flagstaff. He was also featured on the cover of Teacher Magazine, dubbed the "Unsinkable Stu Starky." Starky was defeated in a landslide. However, he had the highest vote per dollar amount in the country, spending only about $15,000 for his campaign (Starky's campaign may have been aided by John Kerry running for president).

Arizona general election
Party	Candidate	Votes	%	±%
Republican	John McCain (incumbent)	1,505,372	76.74	+7.99%
Democratic	Stuart Starky	404,507	20.62	−6.54%
Libertarian	Ernest Hancock	51,798	2.64	+0.37%
Majority		1,100,865	56.12	+14.54%
Turnout		1,961,677		

== Arkansas ==
2004 United States Senate election in Arkansas
- November 2, 2004
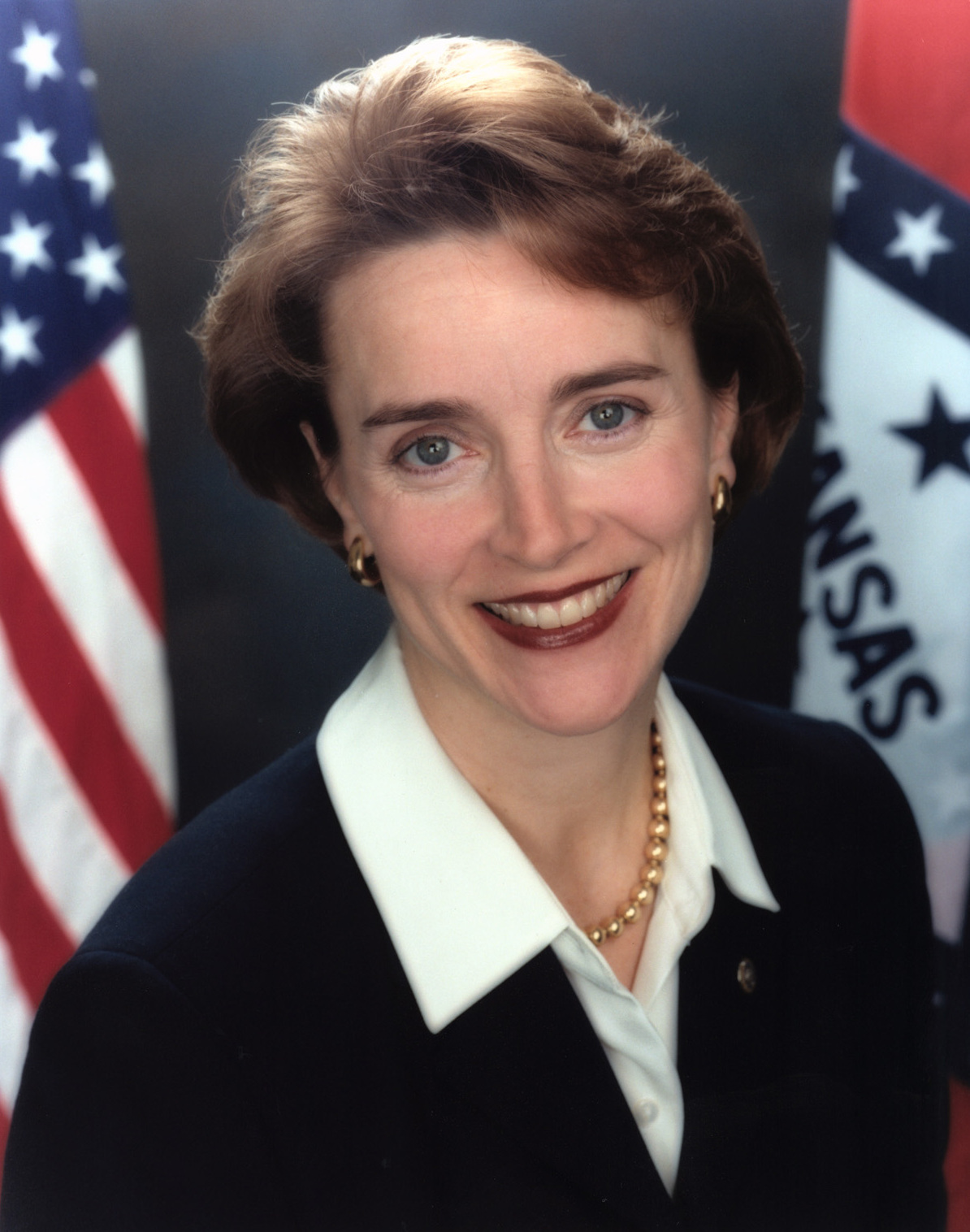

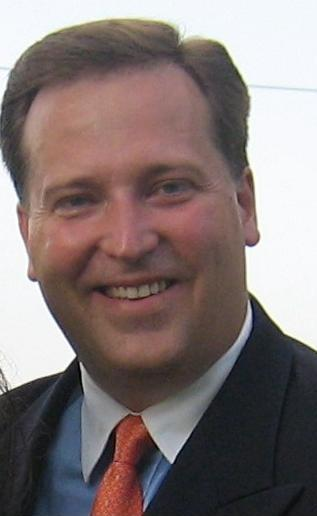
Nominee	Blanche Lincoln	Jim Holt
Party	Democratic	Republican
Popular vote	580,973	458,036
Percentage	55.9%	44.1%
- County results Lincoln: 50–60% 60–70% 70–80% Holt: 50–60%
Senator before election
Blanche Lincoln
Democratic
Elected Senator
Blanche Lincoln
Democratic

Incumbent Democrat Blanche Lincoln ran for re-election. She won re-election over Republican State Senator Jim Holt, while President George W. Bush carried the state with almost the same margin of victory.

The Democratic Party held super-majority status in the Arkansas General Assembly. A majority of local and statewide offices were also held by Democrats. This was rare even for the time in the South, where a majority of statewide offices were and still are held by Republicans. Arkansas had the distinction in 1992 of being the only state in the country to give the majority of its vote to a single candidate in the presidential election—native son Bill Clinton—while every other state's electoral votes were won by pluralities of the vote among the three candidates. Arkansas had since become more reliably Republican in presidential elections. The state voted for George W. Bush over John Kerry in 2004. Lincoln won by 2% less than she had in 1998.

Democrats at the time had an overwhelming majority of registered voters, and the Democratic Party of Arkansas was more conservative than the national entity. Two of Arkansas' three Democratic representatives at the time were members of the Blue Dog Coalition, which tends to be more pro-business, pro-military spending, and socially conservative than the Democratic mainstream.

Republican primary
Party	Candidate	Votes	%
Republican	Jim Holt	37,254	68.9
Republican	Andy Lee	10,709	19.8
Republican	Rosemarie Clampitt	6,078	11.3
Total votes		54,041	100.0

Lincoln was a popular incumbent. In March, she had an approval rating of 55%. Lincoln calls herself an advocate for rural America, having grown up on a farm herself. Holt is from Northwest Arkansas, who also lives on a farm. Holt was widely perceived as a long shot. By the end of June, he only raised $29,000, while Lincoln had over $5 million cash on hand. Lincoln won re-election by over 11%.

Arkansas Senate election 2004
Party	Candidate	Votes	%
Democratic	Blanche Lincoln (incumbent)	580,973	55.90
Republican	Jim Holt	458,036	44.07
Independent	Write Ins	340	0.0
Majority		122,937	11.83
Turnout		1,039,349	

== California ==
California Election
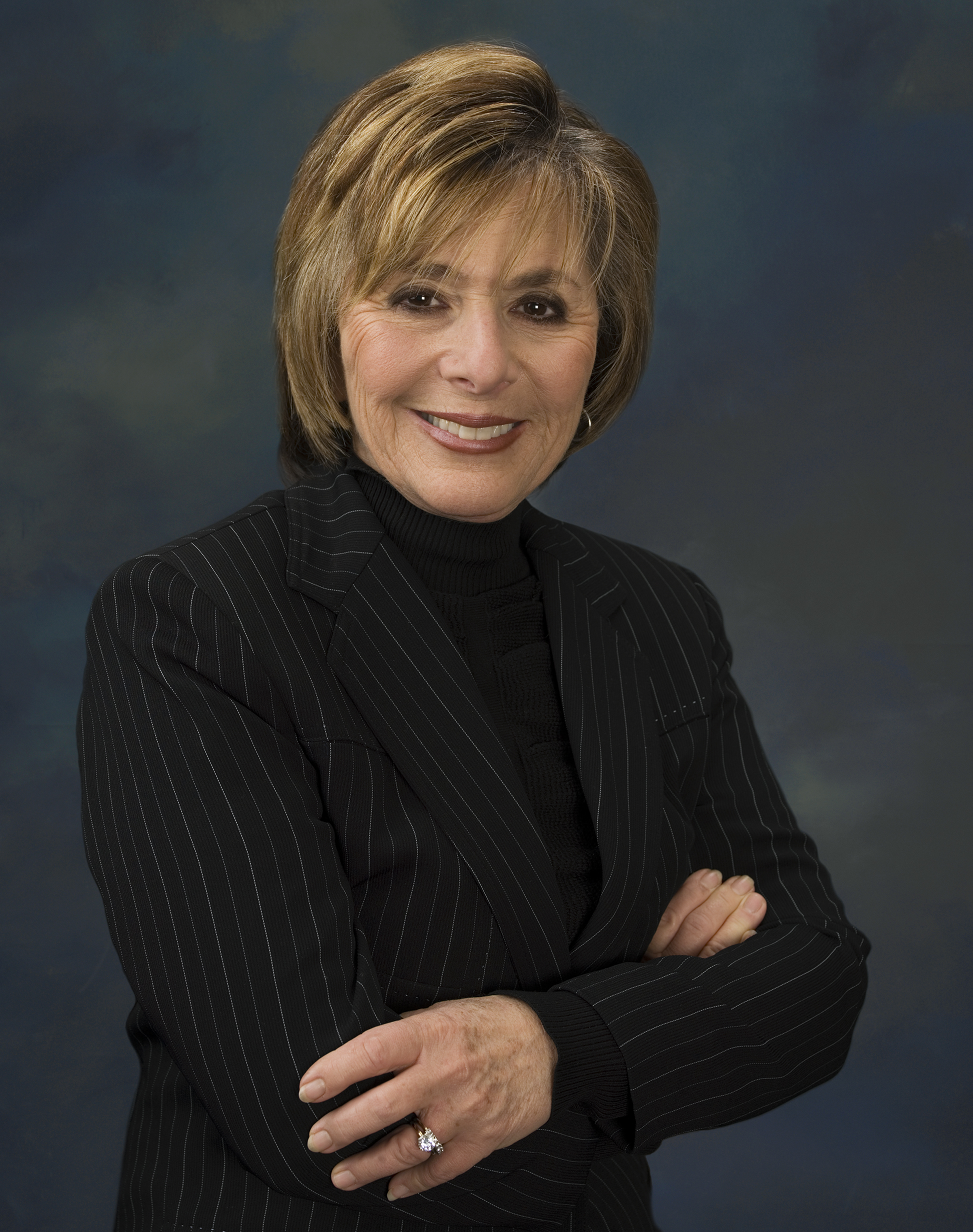

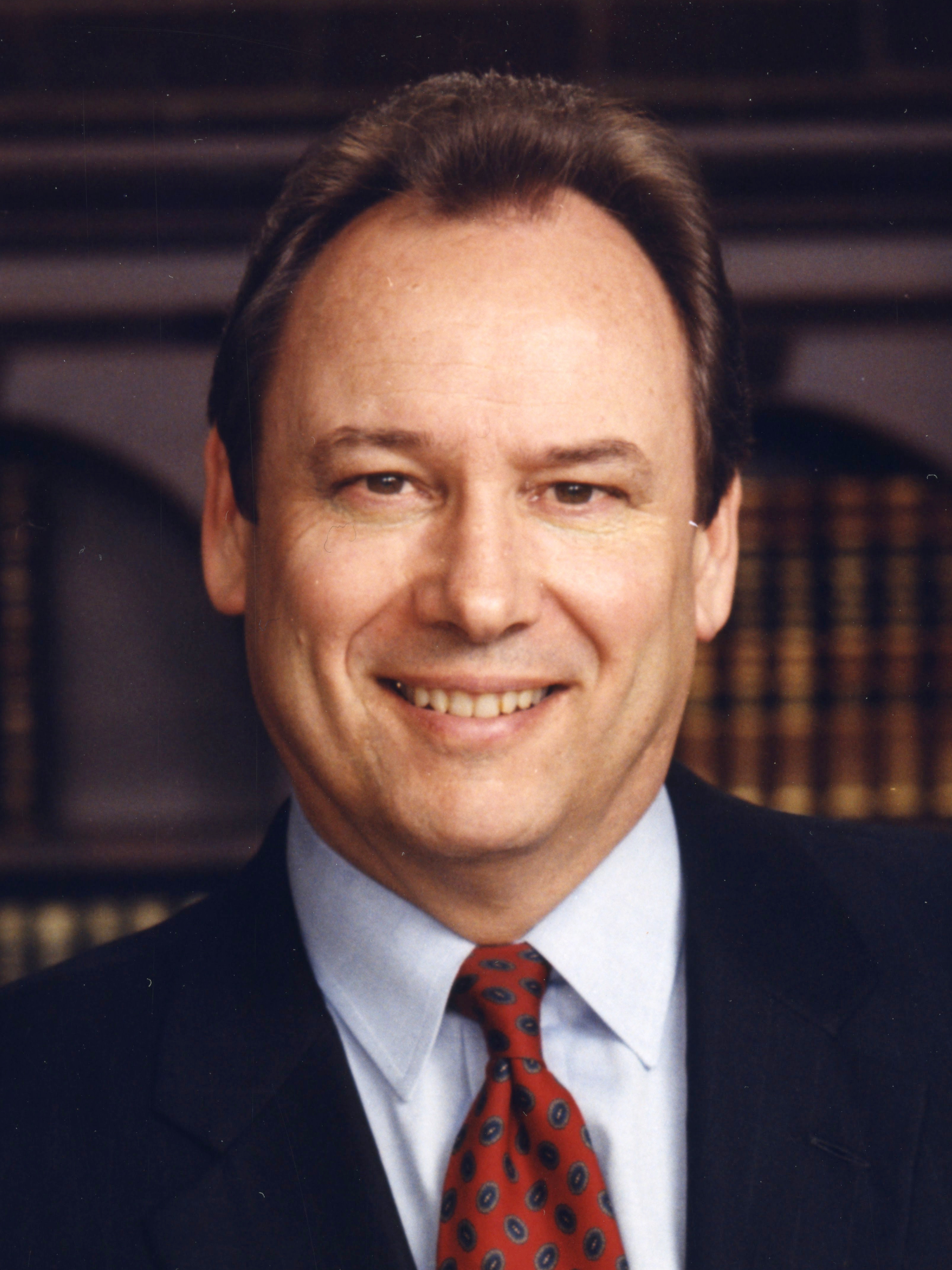
Nominee	Barbara Boxer	Bill Jones
Party	Democratic	Republican
Popular vote	6,955,728	4,555,922
Percentage	57.7%	37.8%
- County results Boxer: 40-50% 50–60% 60–70% 70–80% 80–90% Jones: 40–50% 50–60% 60–70%
U.S. senator before election
Barbara Boxer
Democratic
Elected U.S. Senator
Barbara Boxer
Democratic

Incumbent Democrat Barbara Boxer defeated Republican former secretary of state Bill Jones. Boxer's 6.96 million votes set the record for the most votes cast for one candidate in one state in one election, until it was surpassed by Senator Dianne Feinstein's 7.75 million votes in 2012.

Democratic primary election
Candidate	Votes	%
Barbara Boxer (incumbent)	2,566,298	100.00

Republican primary election
Candidate	Votes	%
Bill Jones	1,015,748	44.81
Rosario Marin	454,176	20.03
Howard Kaloogian	253,331	11.17
Toni Casey	142,080	6.27
Tim Stoen	124,940	5.51
James Stewart	78,264	3.45
Barry L. Hatch	71,244	3.14
John M. Van Zandt	56,925	2.51
Danney Ball	37,745	1.66
Bill Quraishi	32,515	1.43
Total votes	2,266,968	100.00

American Independent primary
Candidate	Votes	%
Don J. Grundmann	32,025	100.00

Libertarian primary
Candidate	Votes	%
Jim Gray	13,656	57.30
Gail Lightfoot	10,177	42.70
Total votes	23,833	100.00

Peace and Freedom primary
Candidate	Votes	%
Marsha Feinland	4,864	100.00

Boxer originally had decided to retire in 2004 but changed her mind to "fight for the right to dissent" against conservatives like Majority Leader Tom DeLay. Jones was widely considered as the underdog. Jones got a major endorsement from the popular Governor Arnold Schwarzenegger. The two major candidates had a debate. Pre-election polling had Boxer leading in double digits. Jones did not release a single TV ad during the campaign. Boxer portrayed Jones as too conservative for California, citing his votes in the California Assembly (1982 to 1994) against gun control, increased minimum wage, support for offshore drilling, and a loosening of environmental regulations.

Jones raised about $700,000 more than Boxer during the third quarter, pulling in $2.5 million to Boxer's $1.8 million. Overall, Boxer raised $16 million to Jones' $6.2 million. Boxer spent about $7 million on radio and television ads alone.

The election was not close, with Boxer winning by an outsized 20-point margin. Jones only performed well in rural parts of the state. Boxer won almost all major metropolitan areas in the state. The race was called right when the polls closed at 11:00 P.M. EST, and 7:00 P.M. PTZ. Jones conceded defeat to Boxer at 11:12 P.M. EST, and 7:12 PTZ.

California general election
Party	Candidate	Votes	%
Democratic	Barbara Boxer (incumbent)	6,955,728	57.71
Republican	Bill Jones	4,555,922	37.80
Peace and Freedom	Marsha Feinland	243,846	2.02
Libertarian	James P. "Jim" Gray	216,522	1.80
American Independent	Don J. Grundmann	81,244	0.67
No party	Dennis Richter (write-in)	43	0.00
No party	Howard Johnson (write-in)	8	0.00
No party	John Emery Jones (write-in)	2	0.00
Invalid or blank votes		536,388	4.26
Total votes		12,589,703	100.00
Turnout			57.03

== Colorado ==
Colorado Election
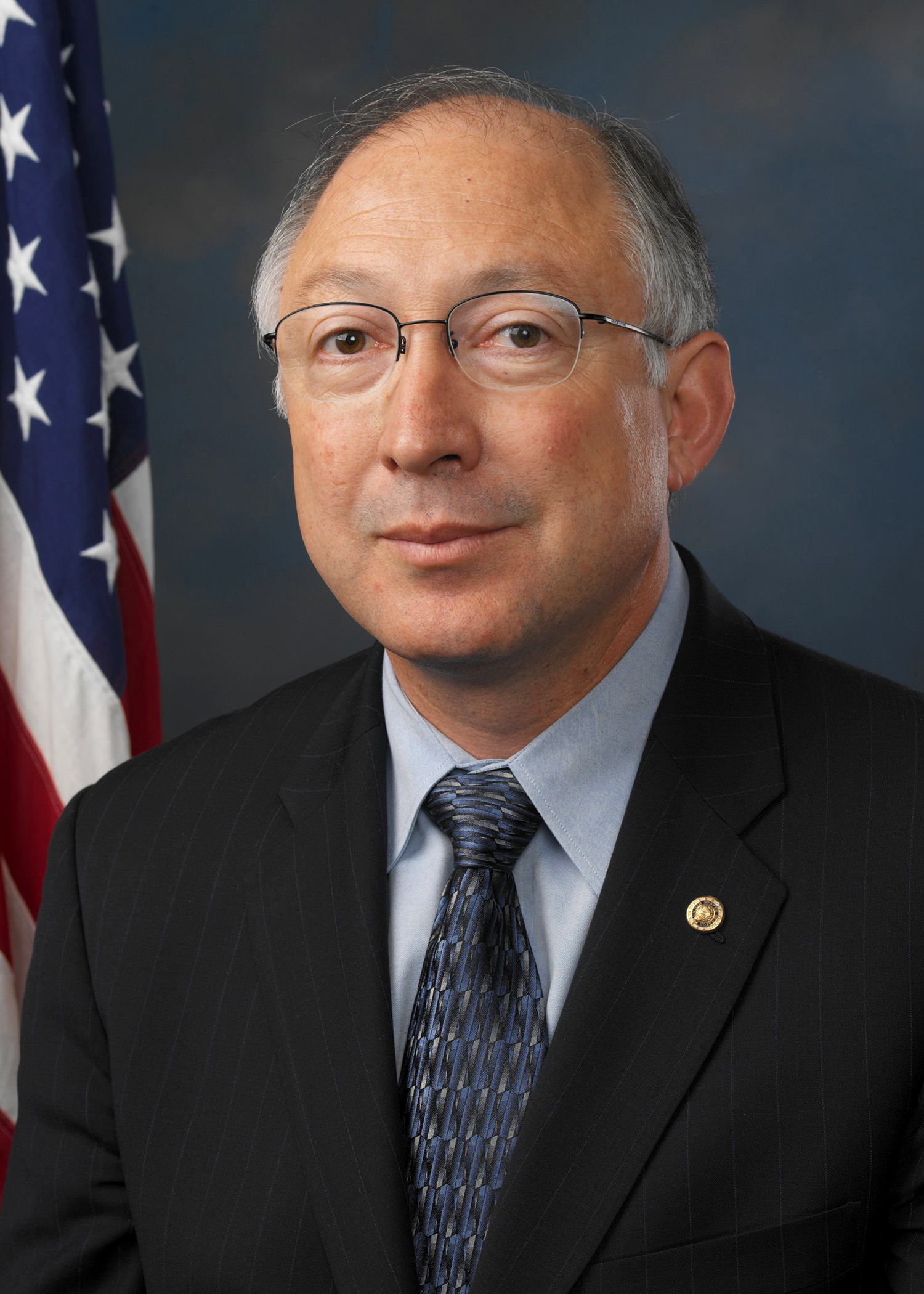

Nominee	Ken Salazar	Pete Coors
Party	Democratic	Republican
Popular vote	1,081,188	980,668
Percentage	51.3%	47.4%
- County results Salazar: 40–50% 50–60% 60–70% 70–80% Coors: 40–50% 50–60% 60–70%
U.S. senator before election
Ben Nighthorse Campbell
Republican
Elected U.S. Senator
Ken Salazar
Democratic

Incumbent Republican Ben Nighthorse Campbell decided to retire instead of seeking a third term. Democratic Attorney General of Colorado Ken Salazar won the open seat.

Before Campbell's retirement, no prominent Democrat had entered the race, with educator Mike Miles and businessman Rutt Bridges pursuing the Democratic nomination. After Campbell's retirement, some expected popular Republican governor Bill Owens to enter the race; but he declined to run. Campbell's retirement and Owens' decision not to run prompted a number of prominent Democrats to reexamine the race.

On March 10, the same day Owens announced he would not run, U.S. Congressman Mark Udall entered the race. The next day, state Attorney General Ken Salazar entered the race, leading Udall to immediately withdraw and endorse him. Salazar lost to Mike Miles at the state nominating convention. In spite of this loss, the national Democratic Party backed Salazar with contributions from the DSCC and promotion of Salazar as the only primary candidate.

Democratic primary
Party	Candidate	Votes	%
Democratic	Ken Salazar	173,167	73.02
Democratic	Mike Miles	63,973	26.98
Total votes		237,140	100.00

The two candidates got into an ideological battle, as U.S. representative Bob Schaffer attacked Pete Coors, former CEO and chairman of Coors Brewing Company, because his company had provided benefits to the partners of its gay and lesbian employees, in addition to promoting its beer in gay bars. Coors defended himself by saying that he was opposed to same-sex marriage, and supported a constitutional amendment to ban it, although he noted that he supported civil unions for gay couples. According to the Rocky Mountain News, Coors described his company's pro-LGBT practices as "good business, separate from politics." Coors defeated Schaffer with 61% of the vote in the primary, with a number of analysts citing his high name recognition in the state as a primary factor.

Republican primary
Party	Candidate	Votes	%
Republican	Pete Coors	203,157	60.57
Republican	Bob Schaffer	132,274	39.43
Total votes		335,431	100.00

Pete Coors ran as a moderate conservative. However, Salazar was also a moderate, and a highly popular state attorney general. Coors is also a great-grandson of Adolph Coors, founder of the brewing company. His father is Joseph Coors, president of the company and founding member of The Heritage Foundation, a conservative think tank. Salazar narrowly won the open seat. It was one of only two Democratic pickups in the 2004 Senate elections; Illinois was the other.

According to the non-partisan OpenSecrets, Coors gave his own campaign $1,213,657 and received individual donations of $60,550 from other Coors family members.

A state record of over $11 million was raised during the election.

Colorado general election
Party	Candidate	Votes	%	±%
Democratic	Ken Salazar	1,081,188	51.30	+16.29%
Republican	Pete Coors	980,668	46.53	−15.96%
Constitution	Douglas Campbell	18,783	0.89	+0.15%
Libertarian	Richard Randall	10,160	0.48	
Independent	John R. Harris	8,442	0.40	
Reform	Victor Good	6,481	0.31	
Independent	Finn Gotaas	1,750	0.08	
Majority		100,520	4.77	−22.70%
Turnout		2,107,472		

== Connecticut ==
2004 United States Senate election in Connecticut
- November 2, 2004
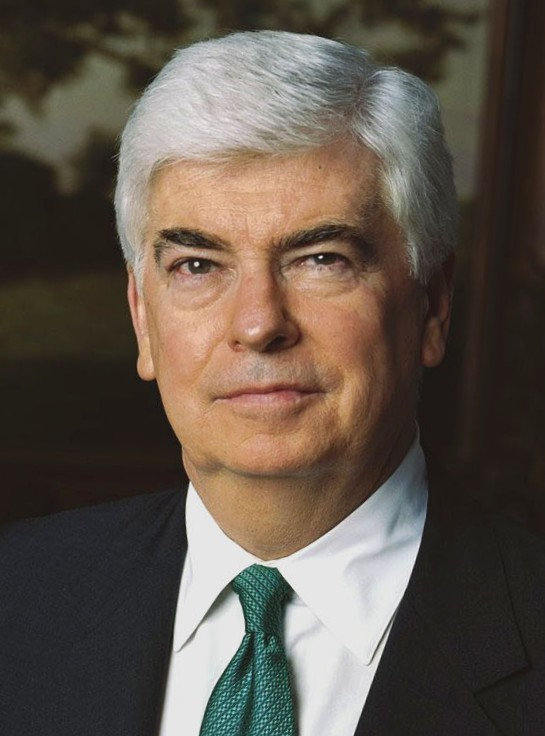

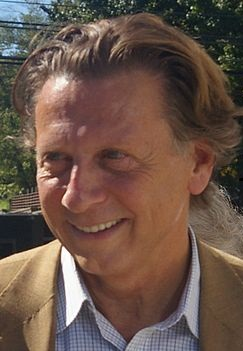
Nominee	Chris Dodd	Jack Orchulli
Party	Democratic	Republican
Popular vote	945,347	457,749
Percentage	66.4%	32.1%
- Dodd: 50–60% 60–70% 70–80% 80–90% Orchulli: 40–50% 50–60%
U.S. senator before election
Chris Dodd
Democratic
Elected U.S. Senator
Chris Dodd
Democratic

Incumbent Democrat Chris Dodd won re-election for a fifth term, beating Republican Jack Orchulli, CEO and co-founder of a Michael Kors's apparel company.

Chris Dodd was one of the most powerful senators in Congress. In the election cycle, he raised over $7 million. His top five contributors were Bear Stearns, Citigroup, National Westminster Bank, Lehman Brothers, and Goldman Sachs.

Republican nominee Jack Orchulli ran as a fiscal conservative and social moderate. He broke ranks with his party on gay marriage and abortion. That put him on the same side as most voters in the blue state of Connecticut. He often talked about a "broken education system." He argued that Dodd had not done anything in his 30 years in Congress to fix such issues as traffic problems in Fairfield County.

Orchulli launched a statewide TV ad campaign in September, as he spent over $1.1 million and pledged to spend "whatever it takes" if polls showed he was gaining ground on Dodd.

Connecticut General election
Party	Candidate	Votes	%
Democratic	Chris Dodd (incumbent)	945,347	66.35
Republican	Jack Orchulli	457,749	32.13
Concerned Citizens	Timothy Knibbs	12,442	0.87
Libertarian	Leonard Rasch	9,188	0.64
Majority		487,598	34.22
Turnout		1,424,726	

== Florida ==
Florida Election
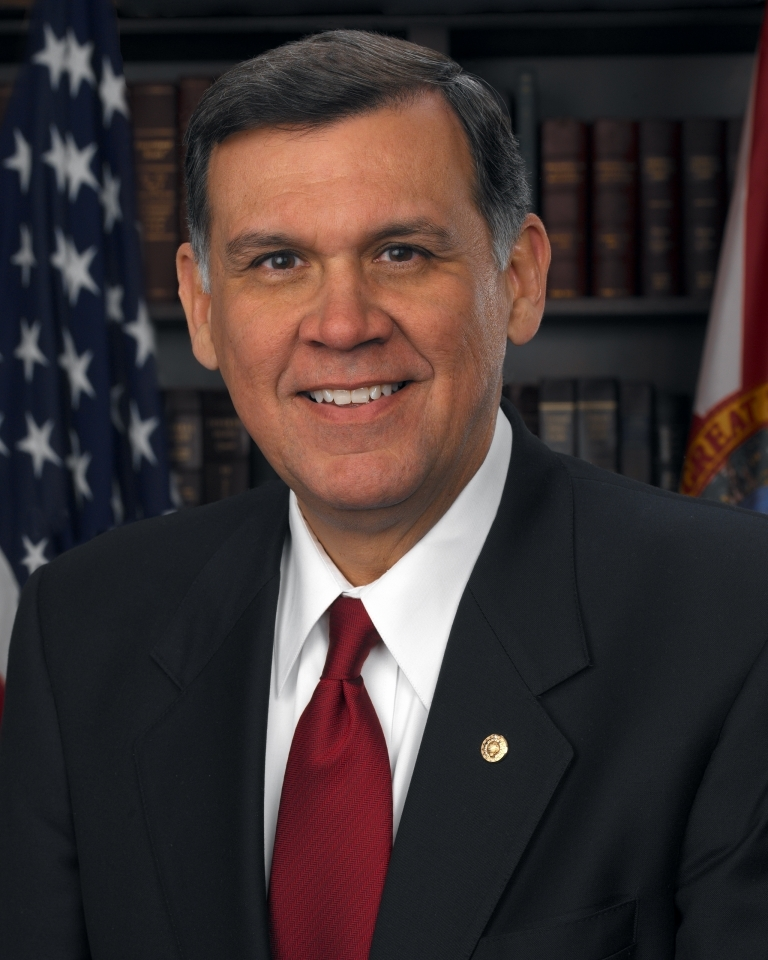

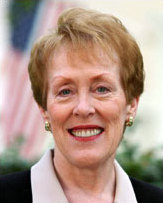
Nominee	Mel Martínez	Betty Castor
Party	Republican	Democratic
Popular vote	3,672,864	3,590,201
Percentage	49.4%	48.3%
- County results Martinez: 40–50% 50–60% 60–70% 70–80% Castor: 40-50% 50–60% 60–70% 70–80%
U.S. senator before election
Bob Graham
Democratic
Elected U.S. Senator
Mel Martínez
Republican

Incumbent Democrat Bob Graham retired after three terms. The primary elections were held on August 31, 2004. Republican Mel Martínez won the open seat, beating Democrat Betty Castor, former president of the University of South Florida, former aducation commissioner of Florida, and former state senator. Martínez, a former U.S. secretary of housing and urban development, was supported by the Bush administration.

Democratic primary
Party	Candidate	Votes	%
Democratic	Betty Castor	669,346	58.1
Democratic	Peter Deutsch	321,922	27.9
Democratic	Alex Penelas	115,898	10.1
Democratic	Bernard E. Klein	45,347	3.9
Total votes		1,152,513	100.0%

Republican primary
Party	Candidate	Votes	%
Republican	Mel Martínez	522,994	44.9
Republican	Bill McCollum	360,474	30.9
Republican	Doug Gallagher	158,360	13.6
Republican	Johnnie Byrd	68,982	5.9
Republican	Karen Saull	20,365	1.8
Republican	Sonya March	17,804	1.5
Republican	Larry Klayman	13,257	1.1
Republican	William Billy Kogut	3,695	0.3
Total votes		1,165,931	100.0%

In the spring, the campaign hired fundraising staff from the defunct presidential campaigns of Howard Dean and Bob Graham, and subsequently posted much higher fundraising numbers over the summer. Online grassroots techniques devised for the Dean campaign (Castor became a Dean Dozen candidate in August) were one contributing factor. Another was the support of EMILY's List, which named Castor as its highest-rated candidate for the 2004 election cycle, even when her support for banning intact dilation and extraction (D&X) abortions was not in line with the EMILY's List support for women's issues. The latter was a source of criticism during the August primary heat - a complaint was filed by a Deutsch supporter with the Federal Election Commission accusing inappropriate coordination with EMILY's List. The complaint was dismissed by the Federal Election Commission in 2005.

Castor's handling of Sami Al-Arian became another source of criticism during the campaign. In June, The American Democracy Project, a 527 group founded by Bernie Friedman, began attacking Castor's handling of the incident, alleging that she had sufficient evidence to fire Al-Arian in the mid-1990s. Castor responded by stating that she never had sufficient evidence to fire Al-Arian, who was a tenured professor at the time. On June 29, Senator Graham, who had previously remained outside of the Al-Arian controversy, released a statement saying, "Betty Castor acted appropriately as President of the University of South Florida to deal with Sami Al-Arian". Later, Graham and Senator Bill Nelson brokered an agreement between the Democratic candidates to refrain from negative campaigning against each other, although this agreement appeared to break down in the final weeks of the race, when Deutsch launched attack ads on television.

Despite these controversies, Castor won the Democratic nomination on August 31. She was defeated, however, by Republican candidate Mel Martínez in a close race on November 2, 2004. The overwhelming support for Martínez among Latinos effectively counterbalanced Castor's relatively high popularity among swing voters throughout the state.

There was some speculation that Castor would run for governor of Florida in 2006 to replace Jeb Bush, who was ineligible for re-election due to term limits, but she announced in 2005 that she would not be a candidate.

2004 United States Senate election in Florida
Party	Candidate	Votes	%	±%
Republican	Melquíades Rafael Martínez Ruiz	3,672,864	49.43	+11.9%
Democratic	Elizabeth Castor	3,590,201	48.32	−14.15%
Veterans	Dennis F. Bradley	166,642	2.24	+2.24%
Write-ins		187	0.00	+0.0%
Majority		82,663	1.11	−23.83%
Turnout		7,429,894	70.92	+24.08%
Total votes		7,429,894	100.00	+3,529,732

== Georgia ==
Georgia Election
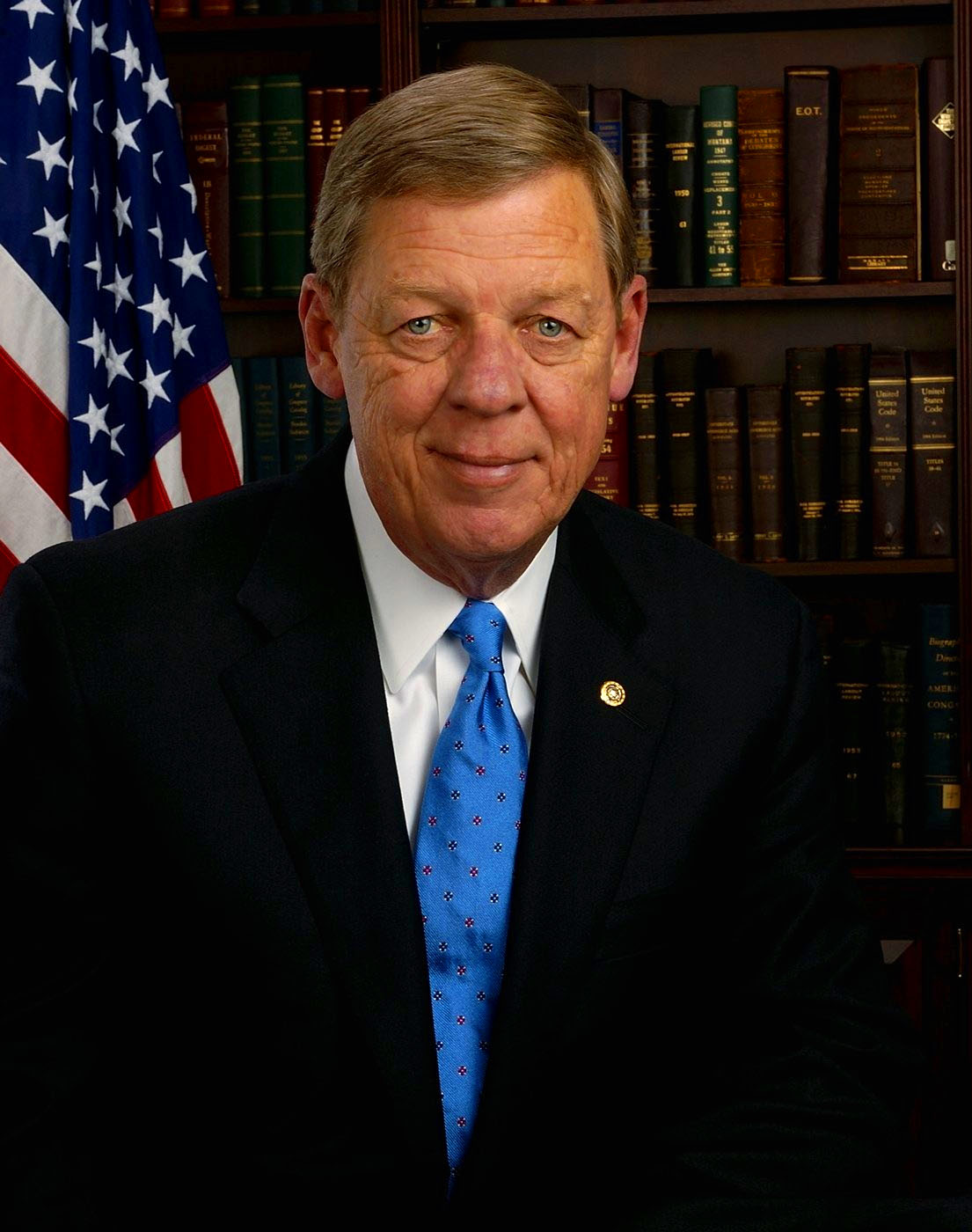

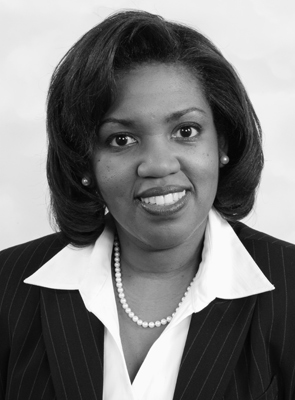
Nominee	Johnny Isakson	Denise Majette
Party	Republican	Democratic
Popular vote	1,864,205	1,287,695
Percentage	57.9%	40.0%
- Isakson: 40–50% 50–60% 60–70% 70–80% 80–90% Majette: 40–50% 50–60% 60–70% 70–80%
U.S. senator before election
Zell Miller
Democratic
Elected U.S. Senator
Johnny Isakson
Republican

Incumbent Democrat Zell Miller retired. Democratic U.S. representative Denise Majette became both the first African American and the first woman to be nominated for the U.S. Senate in Georgia. Republican U.S. representative Johnny Isakson won the open seat.

The results were almost a complete reversal from the previous election in 2000.

Majette's announcement that she would seek to replace Miller also caught Democrats by surprise, as she was not on anyone's call list when Democrats began seeking a candidate to replace Miller. Further skepticism among Democrats about the viability of her candidacy surfaced when she announced that "God" had told her to run for the Senate. She received important endorsements from U.S. senators Mary Landrieu of Louisiana and Debbie Stabenow of Michigan, along with others in Washington who campaigned and raised money for Majette. Her Senate campaign slogan was "I'll be nobody's Senator, but yours."

A number of factors led to Majette's loss. These include her late start, larger conservative turnout from a proposed constitutional amendment banning same-sex marriages (which Majette opposed), the popularity of President George W. Bush in Georgia, and her lack of experience (being a one-term congresswoman).

Republican primary
Party	Candidate	Votes	%
Republican	Johnny Isakson	346,765	53.2%
Republican	Herman Cain	170,464	26.2%
Republican	Mac Collins	134,053	20.6%

Georgia general election
Party	Candidate	Votes	%	±%
Republican	Johnny Isakson	1,864,205	57.88	+19.97%
Democratic	Denise Majette	1,287,695	39.98	−18.22%
Libertarian	Allen Buckley	69,051	2.14	+2.14%
Majority		576,510	17.90	
Turnout		3,220,951		

== Hawaii ==
Hawaii Election
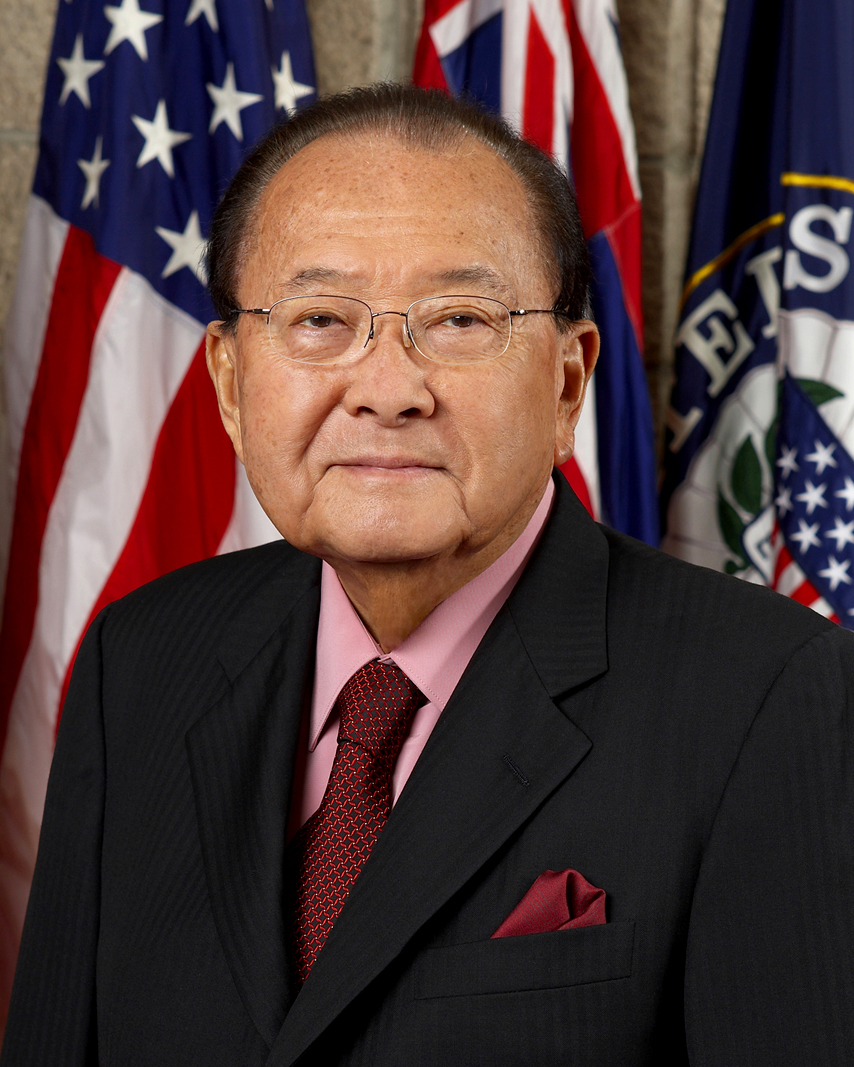

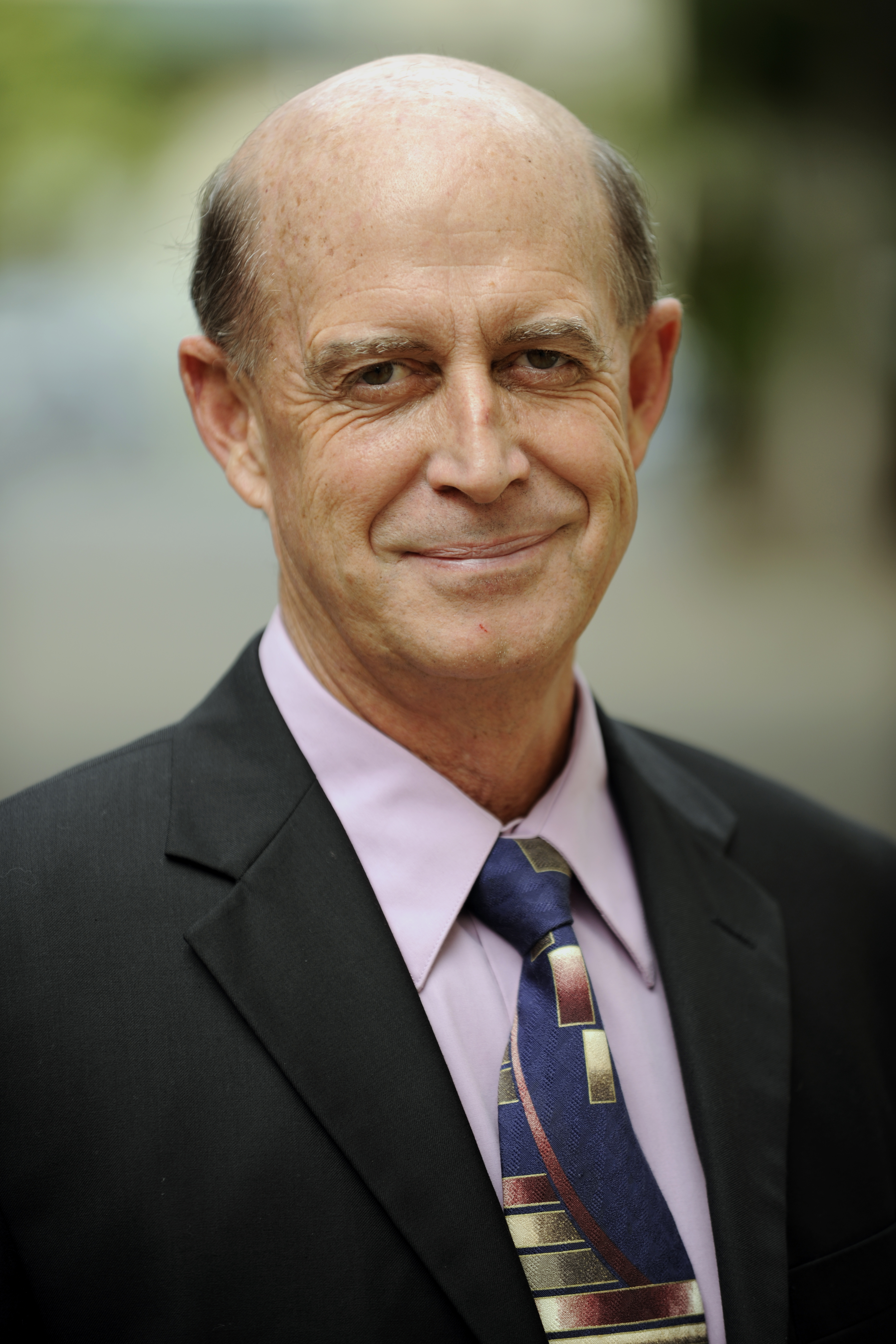
Nominee	Daniel Inouye	Cam Cavasso
Party	Democratic	Republican
Popular vote	313,629	87,172
Percentage	75.5%	21.0%
- County results Inouye: 70–80%
U.S. senator before election
Daniel Inouye
Democratic
Elected U.S. Senator
Daniel Inouye
Democratic

Incumbent Democrat U.S. senator Daniel Inouye won re-election to an eighth term over Republican, Campbell Cavasso, a former state representative.

Inouye won every single county with at least 70% of the vote. His best performance was in Kauaʻi County, where he won with an estimated 80%; this was also the site of Cavasso's weakest performance, getting just 16.5% of the vote there.

Hawaii General election
Party	Candidate	Votes	%
Democratic	Daniel Inouye (incumbent)	313,629	75.5
Republican	Campbell Cavasso	87,172	21.0
Independent	Jim Brewer	9,269	2.2
Libertarian	Lloyd Jeffrey Mallan	5,277	1.3
Total votes		415,347	100.00

== Idaho ==
Idaho Election
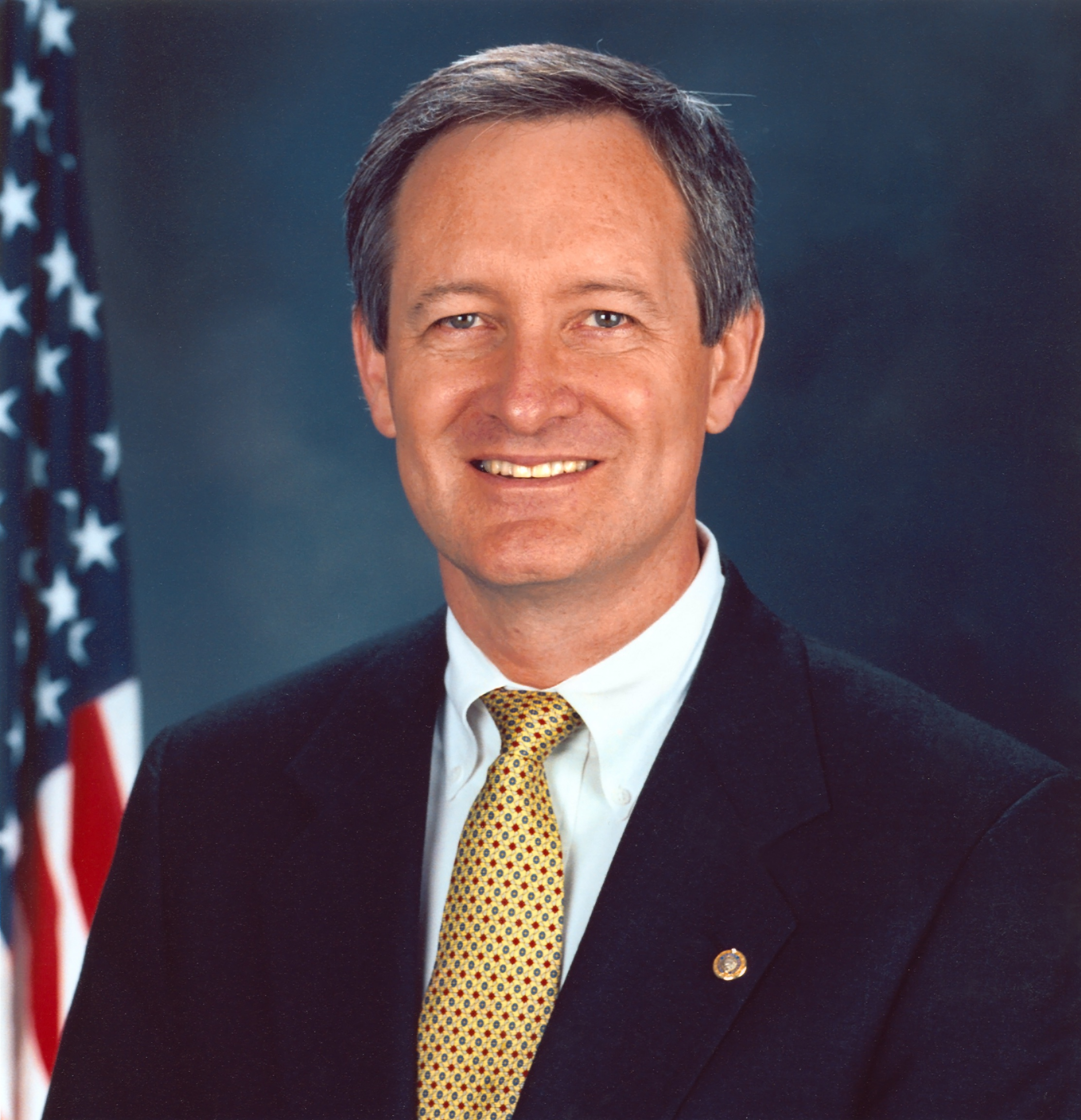
Nominee	Mike Crapo
Party	Republican
Popular vote	499,796
Percentage	99.2%
- County results Crapo: >90% 100%
U.S. senator before election
Mike Crapo
Republican
Elected U.S. Senator
Mike Crapo
Republican

Incumbent Republican Mike Crapo won a second term in a landslide after no one filed for the Democratic nomination. Democrat Scott McClure conducted a write-in campaign but only received 4,136 votes, or about 1% of those cast.

Republican primary
Party	Candidate	Votes	%
Republican	Mike Crapo (incumbent)	118,286	100.00
Total votes		118,286	100.00%

Crapo won every county with over 95% of the vote. His weakest performance by far was in Latah County, where he got 95.6% of the vote to McClure's 4.4%.

2004 United States Senate election in Idaho
Party	Candidate	Votes	%	±%
Republican	Mike Crapo (incumbent)	499,796	99.18	+29.64%
Democratic	Scott F. McClure (write-in)	4,136	0.82	+0.82%
Majority		495,660	98.36	+57.22%
Turnout		503,932		

== Illinois ==
Illinois Election
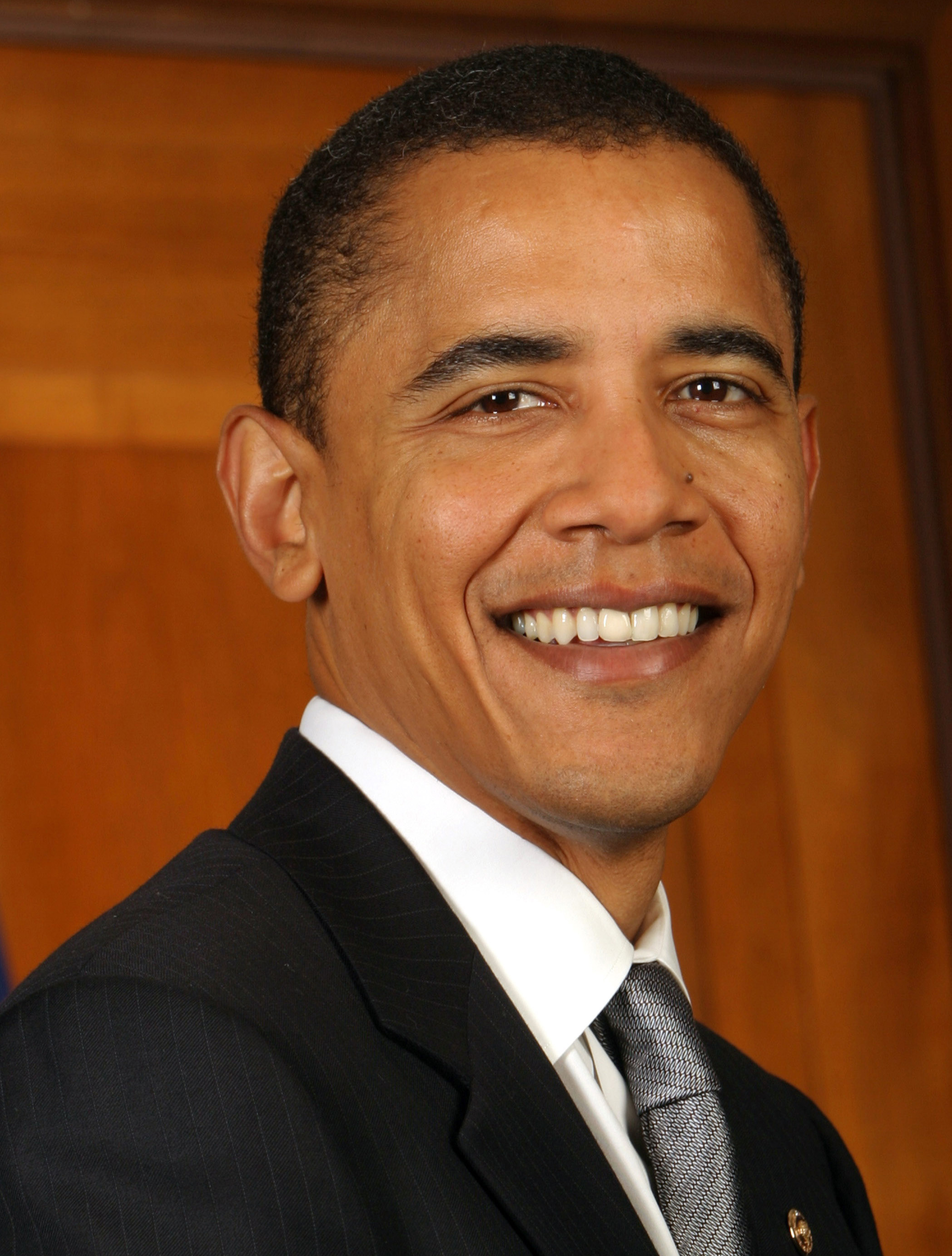

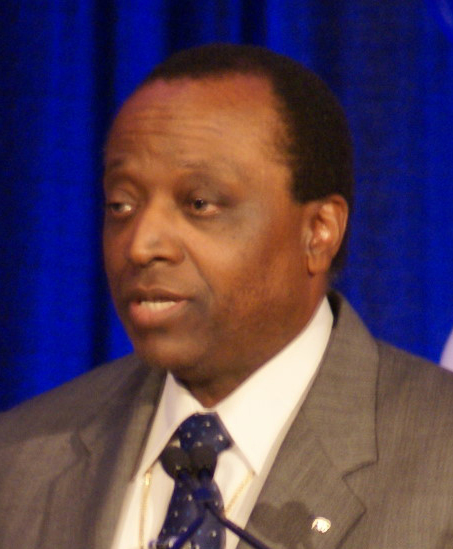
Nominee	Barack Obama	Alan Keyes
Party	Democratic	Republican
Popular vote	3,597,456	1,390,690
Percentage	70.0%	27.0%
- County results Obama: 40-50% 50–60% 60–70% 70–80% 80–90% Keyes: 50–60%
U.S. senator before election
Peter Fitzgerald
Republican
Elected U.S. Senator
Barack Obama
Democratic

Incumbent Republican Peter Fitzgerald decided to retire after one term. The Democratic and Republican primary elections were held in March, which included a total of 15 candidates who combined to spend a record total of over $60 million seeking the open seat.

State Senator and future president Barack Obama won the Democratic primary and Jack Ryan won the Republican primary. Ryan withdrew from the race four days after the Chicago Tribune persuaded a California court to release child custody records. The Illinois Republican State Central Committee chose former diplomat Alan Keyes to replace Ryan as the Republican candidate.

The election was the first for the U.S. Senate in which both major party candidates were African American. Obama's 43% margin of victory was the largest in the state history of U.S. Senate elections. The inequality in the candidates spending for the fall elections – $14,244,768 by Obama and $2,545,325 by Keyes – is also among the largest in history in both absolute and relative terms.

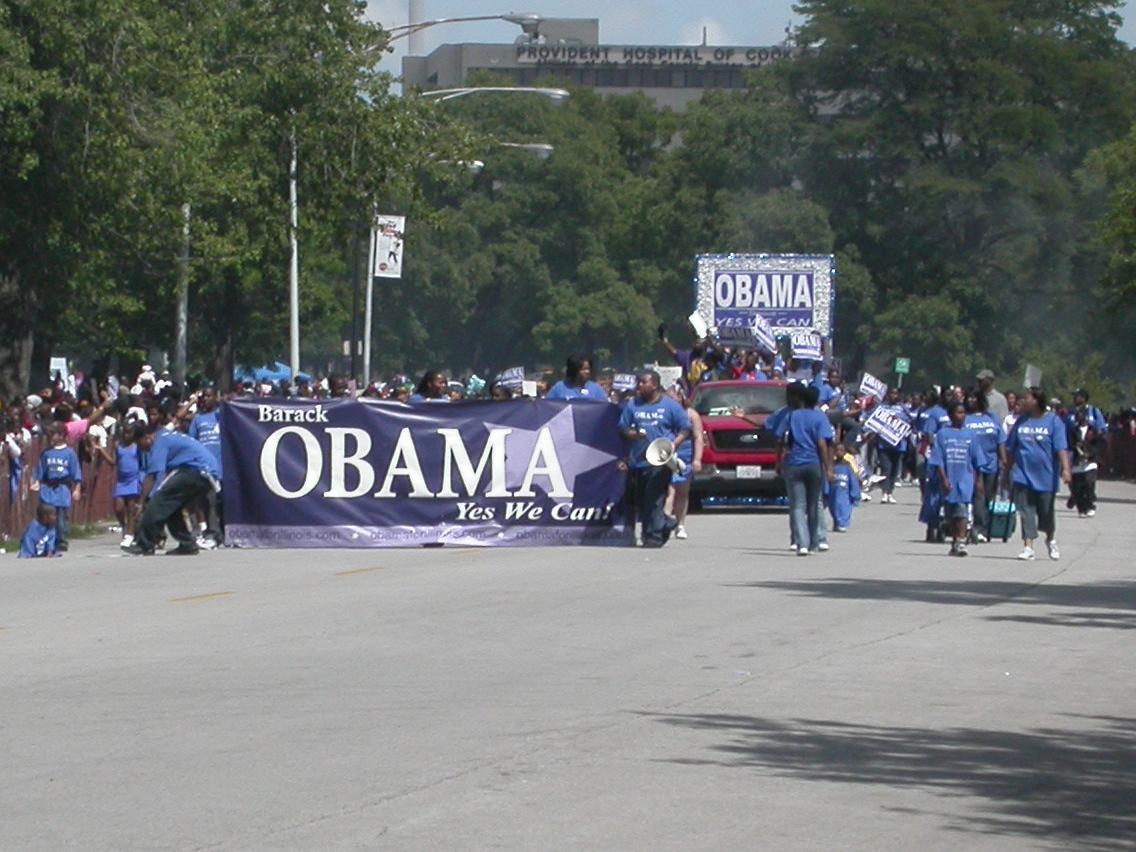
Obama-for-Senate float at the 2004 Bud Billiken Parade and Picnic

Fitzgerald's predecessor, Democrat Carol Moseley Braun, declined to run. Obama, a member of the Illinois Senate since 1997 and an unsuccessful 2000 Democratic primary challenger to four-term incumbent U.S. Rep. Bobby Rush for Rush's U.S House seat, launched a campaign committee at the beginning of July 2002 to run for the U.S. Senate, 21 months before the March 2004 primary. Two months later, he had David Axelrod lined up to do his campaign media. Obama formally announced his candidacy on January 21, 2003, four days after former U.S. Sen. Carol Moseley Braun announced she would not seek a rematch with U.S. Sen. Peter Fitzgerald.

On April 15, 2003, with six Democrats already running and three Republicans threatening to run against him, incumbent Fitzgerald announced he would not seek a second term in 2004, and three weeks later popular Republican former governor Jim Edgar declined to run, leading to wide open Democratic and Republican primary races with 15 candidates, including seven millionaires (triggering the first application of the Millionaires' Amendment of the 2002 McCain–Feingold Act), in the most expensive Senate primary in U.S. history.

Obama touted his legislative experience and early public opposition to the Iraq War to distinguish himself from his Democratic primary rivals. Illinois Comptroller Dan Hynes won the endorsement of the AFL–CIO. Obama obtained the support of three of the state's largest and most active member unions: AFSCME, SEIU, and the Illinois Federation of Teachers. Hynes and multimillionaire former securities trader Blair Hull each won the endorsements of two of the nine Democratic Illinois members of the US House of Representatives. Obama had the endorsements of four: Jesse Jackson, Jr., Danny Davis, Lane Evans, and Jan Schakowsky.

Obama surged into the lead after he finally began television advertising in Chicago in the final three weeks of the campaign, which was expanded to downstate Illinois during the last six days of the campaign. The ads included strong endorsements by the five largest newspapers in Illinois—the Chicago Tribune, Chicago Sun-Times, Daily Herald, The Rockford Register Star, and Peoria Journal Star—and a testimonial by Sheila Simon that Obama was "cut from that same cloth" as her father, the late former U.S. senator Paul Simon, who had planned to endorse and campaign for Obama before his unexpected death in December 2003.

On March 16, 2004, Obama won the Democratic primary by an unexpected landslide—receiving 53% of the vote, 29% ahead of his nearest Democratic rival, with a vote total that nearly equaled that of all eight Republican candidates combined—which overnight made him a rising star in the national Democratic Party, started speculation about a presidential future, and led to the reissue of his memoir, Dreams from My Father. The Democratic primary election, including seven candidates who combined to spend over $46 million, was the most expensive U.S. Senate primary election in history.

Democratic primary, United States Senate, March 16, 2004
Party	Candidate	Votes	%	±%
Democratic	Barack Obama	655,923	52.8	
Democratic	Daniel W. Hynes	294,717	23.7	
Democratic	Blair Hull	134,453	10.8	
Democratic	Maria Pappas	74,987	6.0	
Democratic	Gery Chico	53,433	4.3	
Democratic	Nancy Skinner	16,098	1.3	
Democratic	Joyce Washington	13,375	1.1	
Democratic	Estella Johnson-Hunt (write-in)	10	0.0	
Majority		361,206	29.4	
Turnout		1,242,996		

GOP frontrunner Jack Ryan had divorced actress Jeri Ryan in 1999, and the records of the divorce were sealed at their mutual request. Five years later, when Ryan's Senate campaign began, the Chicago Tribune newspaper and WLS-TV, the local ABC affiliate, sought to have the records released. On March 3, 2004, several of Ryan's GOP primary opponents urged him to release the records. Both Ryan and his wife agreed to make their divorce records public, but not make the child custody records public, claiming that these could be harmful to their son if released. Ryan won the GOP primary on March 16, 2004, defeating his nearest competitor, Jim Oberweis, by twelve percentage points.

Ryan was a proponent of across-the-board tax cuts and tort reform, an effort to limit payout in medical malpractice lawsuits. He was also a proponent of school choice, and supported vouchers for private school students.

Oberweis's 2004 campaign was notable for a television commercial where he flew in a helicopter over Chicago's Soldier Field, and claimed that enough illegal immigrants came into America in a week (10,000 a day) to fill the stadium's 61,500 seats.

Oberweis was fined $21,000 by the Federal Election Commission for a commercial for his dairy that ran during his 2004 Senate campaign. The FEC ruled that the commercial wrongly benefited his campaign and constituted a corporate contribution, thus violating campaign law.

Republican primary, March 16, 2004
Party	Candidate	Votes	%	±%
Republican	Jack Ryan	234,791	35.5	
Republican	Jim Oberweis	155,794	23.5	
Republican	Steven J. Rauschenberger	132,655	20.0	
Republican	Andrew McKenna	97,238	14.7	
Republican	Jonathan C. Wright	17,189	2.6	
Republican	John Borling	13,390	2.0	
Republican	Norm Hill	5,637	0.9	
Republican	Chirinjeev Kathuria	5,110	0.8	
Majority		78,997	11.9	
Turnout		661,804		

As a result of the GOP and Democratic primaries, Democrat Barack Obama was pitted against Republican Jack Ryan.

Ryan trailed Obama in early polls, after the media reported that Ryan had assigned Justin Warfel, a Ryan campaign worker, to track Obama's appearances. The tactic backfired when multiple people, including Ryan's supporters, criticized this activity. Ryan's spokesman apologized, and promised that Warfel would give Obama more space. Obama acknowledged that it is standard practice to film an opponent in public, and Obama said he was satisfied with Ryan's decision to have Warfel back off.

As the campaign progressed, the lawsuit brought by the Chicago Tribune to open child custody files from Ryan's divorce was still continuing. Obama's backers emailed reporters about the divorce controversy, but refrained from on-the-record commentary. On March 29, 2004, Los Angeles Superior Court Judge Robert Schnider ruled that several of the Ryans' divorce records should be opened to the public, and ruled that a court-appointed referee would later decide which custody files should remain sealed to protect the interests of Ryan's young child. A few days later, on April 2, 2004, Obama changed his position about the Ryans' soon-to-be-released divorce records, and called on Democrats to not inject them into the campaign.

On June 22, 2004, after receiving the report from the court-appointed referee, the judge released the files that were deemed consistent with the interests of the Ryans' child. In those files, Jeri Ryan alleged that Jack Ryan had taken her to sex clubs in several cities, intending for them to have sex in public.

The decision to release the files generated much controversy because it went against both parents' direct request, and because it reversed the earlier decision to seal the papers in the best interest of the child. Jim Oberweis, Ryan's defeated GOP opponent, commented, "these are allegations made in a divorce hearing, and we all know people tend to say things that aren't necessarily true in divorce proceedings when there is money involved and custody of children involved."

Although their sensational nature made the revelations fodder for tabloid and television programs specializing in such stories, the files were also newsworthy because of questions about whether Ryan had accurately described the documents to GOP party leaders. Prior to release of the documents, Ryan had told leading Republicans that five percent of the divorce file could cause problems for his campaign. After the documents were released, GOP officials, including state GOP chair Judy Baar Topinka, said they felt Ryan had misleadingly indicated that the records would not be embarrassing.

That charge of dishonesty led to intensifying calls for Ryan's withdrawal, though Topinka, who was considering running herself, said after the June 25 withdrawal that Ryan's "decision was a personal one" and that the state GOP had not pressured Ryan to drop out. Ryan's campaign ended less than a week after the custody records were opened, and he officially filed the documentation to withdraw on July 29, 2004. Obama was left without an opponent.

The Illinois Republican State Central Committee chose former diplomat Alan Keyes to replace Ryan as the Republican candidate. Keyes, a conservative Republican from Maryland, faced difficulties. He had few ties to Illinois political leaders. The lack of an opponent allowed Obama to campaign throughout the more conservative downstate regions to build up name recognition. Keyes was seen as a carpetbagger, only establishing legal residency in Calumet City, Illinois days before running. A Chicago Tribune editorial stated, "Mr. Keyes may have noticed a large body of water as he flew into O'Hare. That is called Lake Michigan." In 2000, Keyes had attacked Hillary Clinton for running for US senator from New York even though she had never lived there, calling her a carpetbagger. Keyes attacked Barack Obama for voting against a bill that would have outlawed a form of late-term abortion.

Obama ran the most successful Senate campaign in 2004, and was so far ahead in polls that he soon began to campaign outside of Illinois in support of other Democratic candidates. He gave large sums of campaign funds to other candidates and the Democratic Senatorial Campaign Committee, and sent a number of his volunteers to work on other races, including that of eventual three-term Congresswoman Melissa Bean, who defeated then-Congressman Phil Crane in that year's election. Obama and Keyes differed on a number of issues, including school vouchers and tax cuts, both of which Keyes supported and Obama opposed.

Illinois general election
Party	Candidate	Votes	%	±%
Democratic	Barack Obama	3,597,456	70.0	+22.6%
Republican	Alan Keyes	1,390,690	27.0	−23.3%
Independent	Al Franzen	81,164	1.6	
Libertarian	Jerry Kohn	69,253	1.3	
Write-ins		2,957	0.1	
Majority		2,206,766	43.0	+40.1%
Turnout		5,350,493	71.3	

The Obama-Keyes race was one of the first to be called on Election Day, November 2, 2004.

At the start of Keyes's candidacy in August, Keyes had 24% support in the polls. He received 27% of the vote in the November general election to Obama's 70%.

Following the election, Keyes refused to call Obama to congratulate him. Media reports claimed that Keyes also failed to concede the race to Obama. Two days after the election, a radio interviewer asked Keyes whether he had conceded. Keyes replied, "Of course I've conceded the race. I mean, I gave my speech to that effect." On the radio program, Keyes explained that his refusal to congratulate Obama was "not anything personal," but was meant to make a statement against "extend[ing] false congratulations to the triumph of what we have declared to be across the line." He said that Obama's position on moral issues regarding life and the family had crossed that line. "I'm supposed to make a call that represents the congratulations toward the triumph of that which I believe ultimately stands for ... a culture evil enough to destroy the very soul and heart of my country? I can't do this. And I will not make a false gesture."

== Indiana ==
Indiana Election
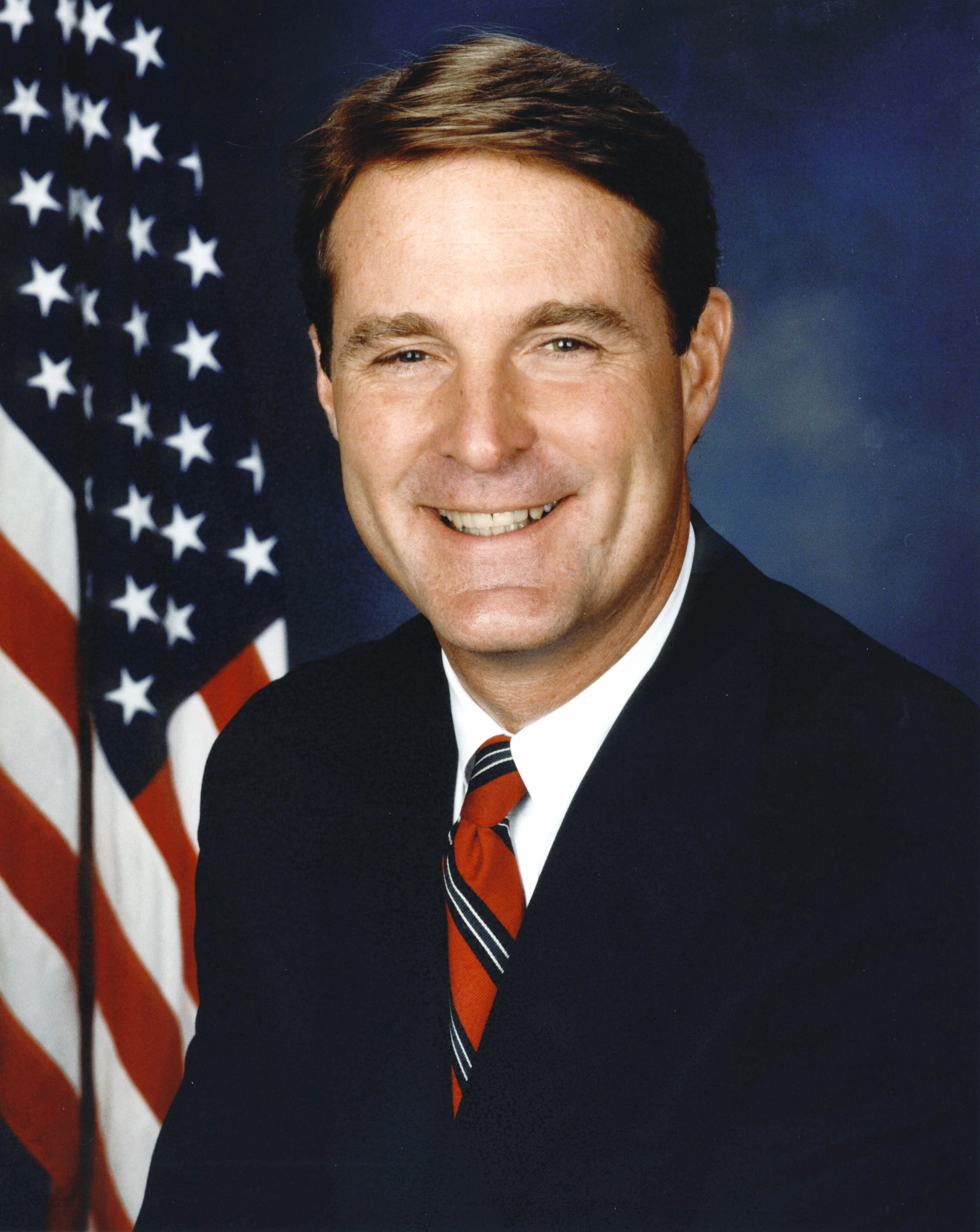

Nominee	Evan Bayh	Marvin Scott
Party	Democratic	Republican
Popular vote	1,496,976	903,913
Percentage	61.7%	37.2%
- County results Bayh: 50–60% 60–70% 70–80% Scott: 40–50% 50–60%
U.S. senator before election
Evan Bayh
Democratic
Elected U.S. Senator
Evan Bayh
Democratic

Incumbent Democrat Evan Bayh won re-election to a second term, beating Republican Marvin Scott, a professor at Butler University.

In September, Bayh had $6.5 million cash on hand. Scott's strategy of trying to paint Bayh as too liberal failed to gain traction. Bayh was viewed early in 2004 as a serious vice presidential candidate for John Kerry. Bayh was on the final shortlist for a Kerry running mate, but North Carolina senator John Edwards was chosen instead.

Bayh won 86 of Indiana's counties compared to six for Scott.

Indiana general election
Party	Candidate	Votes	%	±%
Democratic	Evan Bayh (incumbent)	1,496,976	61.7	
Republican	Marvin Scott	903,913	37.2	
Libertarian	Albert Barger	27,344	1.1	
Majority		593,063		
Turnout		2,428,233	58.0	

== Iowa ==
Iowa Election
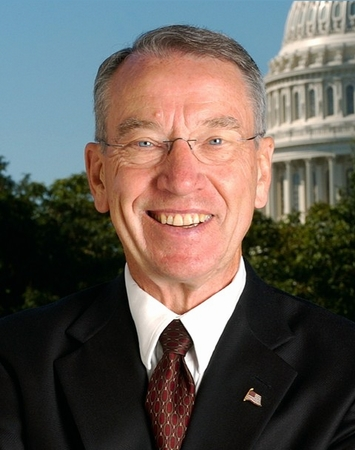

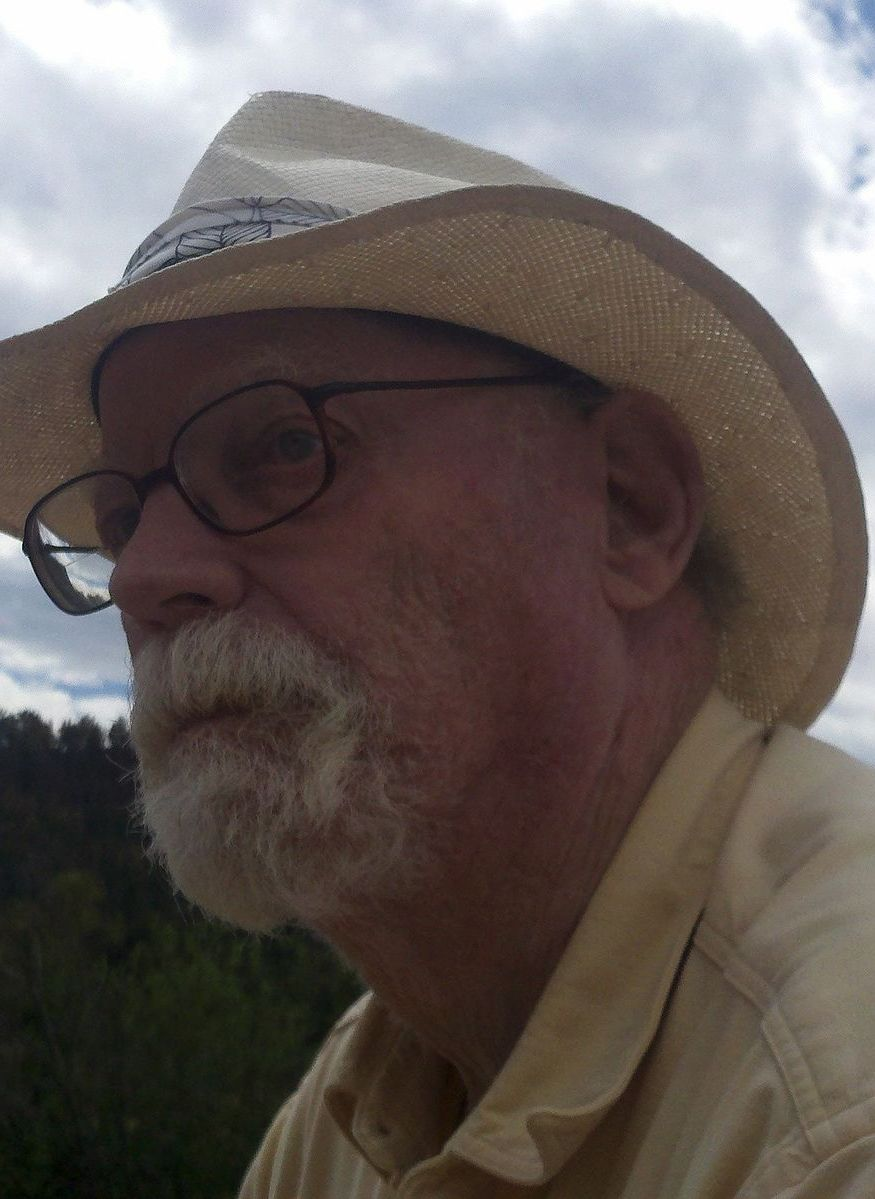
Nominee	Chuck Grassley	Arthur A. Small
Party	Republican	Democratic
Popular vote	1,038,175	412,365
Percentage	70.2%	27.9%
- County results Grassley: 50-60% 60-70% 70-80% 80-90% >90%
U.S. senator before election
Chuck Grassley
Republican
Elected U.S. Senator
Chuck Grassley
Republican

Incumbent Republican Chuck Grassley won a fifth term, beating former Democratic Iowa State Senator Arthur A. Small. Though this election coincided with the highly competitive presidential election in Iowa, Grassley was in little danger of losing his seat and defeated Small handily.

Democratic primary
Party	Candidate	Votes	%
Democratic	Arthur A. Small	52,318	99.25
Democratic	Write-ins	398	0.75
Total votes		52,716	100.00

Republican primary
Party	Candidate	Votes	%
Republican	Chuck Grassley (incumbent)	78,819	99.72
Republican	Write-ins	218	0.28
Total votes		79,037	100.00%

Iowa general election
Party	Candidate	Votes	%	±%
Republican	Chuck Grassley (incumbent)	1,038,175	70.18	+1.77%
Democratic	Arthur A. Small	412,365	27.88	−2.62%
Libertarian	Christy Ann Welty	15,218	1.03	
Green	Daryl A. Northrop	11,121	0.75	
Socialist Workers	Edwin Fruit	1,874	0.13	−0.14%
Write-ins		475	0.03	
Majority		625,810	42.31	+4.39%
Turnout		1,479,228		

== Kansas ==
Kansas Election
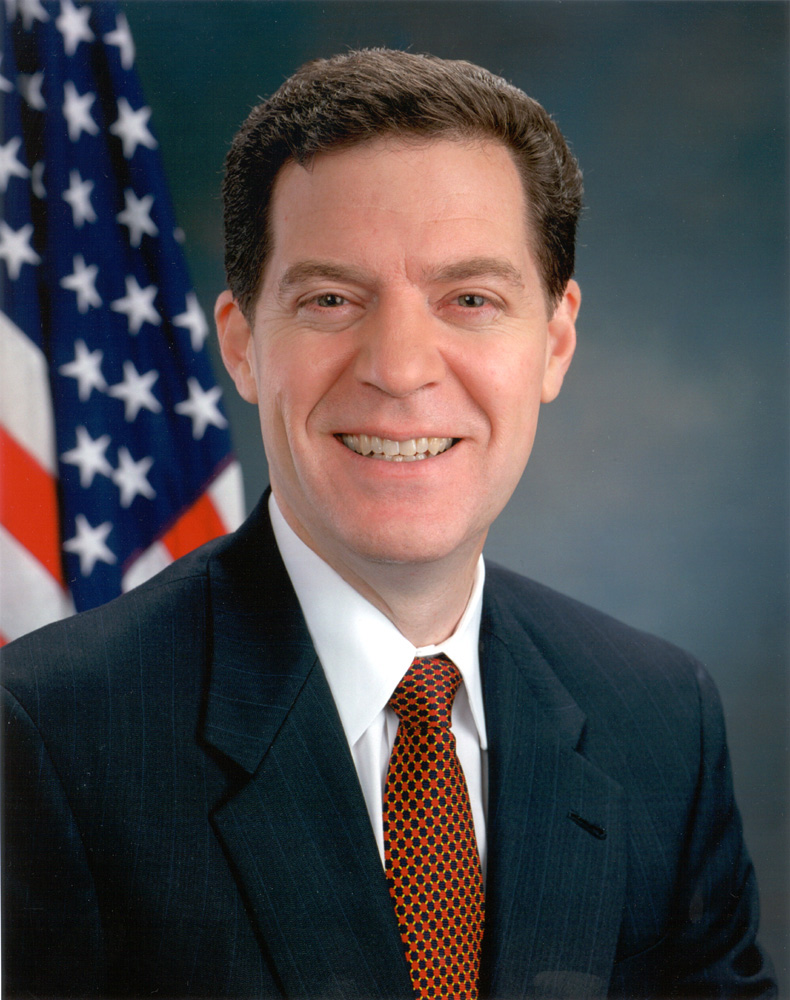

Nominee	Sam Brownback	Lee Jones
Party	Republican	Democratic
Popular vote	780,863	310,337
Percentage	69.2%	27.5%
- County results Brownback: 50–60% 60–70% 70–80% 80–90% >90% Jones: 50–60%
U.S. senator before election
Sam Brownback
Republican
Elected U.S. Senator
Sam Brownback
Republican

Incumbent Republican Sam Brownback won re-election to a second term over Democratic railroad engineer Lee Jones.

Democratic primary
Party	Candidate	Votes	%
Democratic	Robert A. Conroy	61,052	55.92
Democratic	Lee Jones	48,133	44.08
Total votes		109,185	100.00

Though Robert Conroy won the Democratic nomination, he dropped out of the race shortly after becoming the nominee, noting that he expected Jones to win and was tired of campaigning. The Kansas Democratic Party selected Lee Jones as the replacement candidate.

Republican primary
Party	Candidate	Votes	%
Republican	Sam Brownback (incumbent)	286,839	86.99
Republican	Arch Naramore	42,880	13.01
Total votes		329,719	100.00

Brownback raised $2.5 million for his re-election campaign, while Jones raised only $90,000. Kansas last elected a Democratic senator in 1932. Brownback was popular in the state.

Kansas general election
Party	Candidate	Votes	%	±%
Republican	Sam Brownback (incumbent)	780,863	69.16	+3.90%
Democratic	Lee Jones	310,337	27.49	−4.10%
Libertarian	Steven A. Rosile	21,842	1.93	+0.35%
Reform	George Cook	15,980	1.42	−0.14%
Majority		470,526	41.68	+8.00%
Turnout		1,129,022		

== Kentucky ==
Kentucky Election
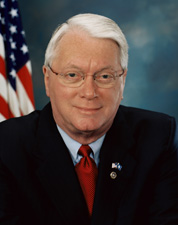

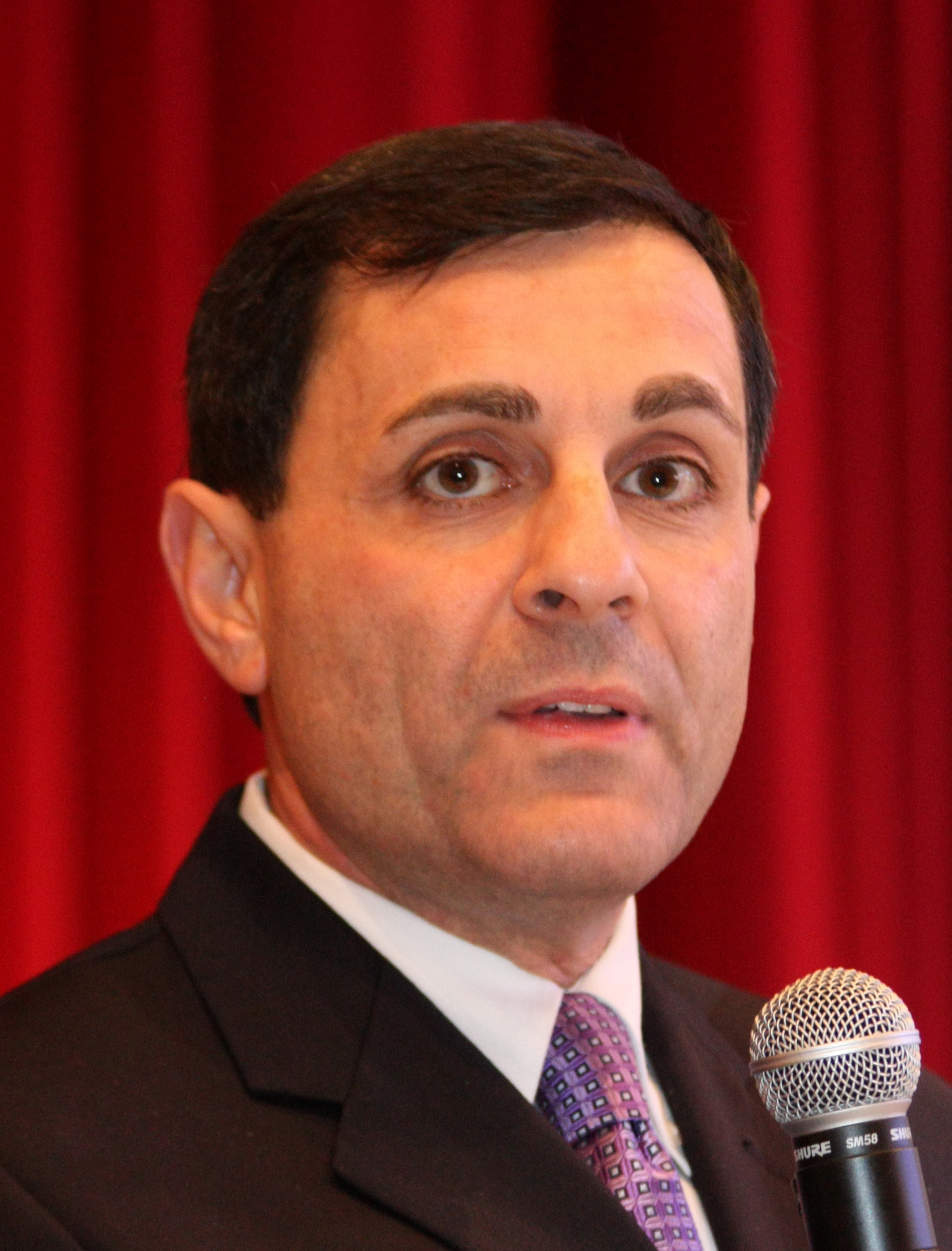
Nominee	Jim Bunning	Daniel Mongiardo
Party	Republican	Democratic
Popular vote	873,507	850,855
Percentage	50.7%	49.3%
- County results Bunning: 50–60% 60–70% 70–80% Mongiardo: 50–60% 60–70% 70–80% 80–90%
U.S. senator before election
Jim Bunning
Republican
Elected U.S. Senator
Jim Bunning
Republican

Incumbent Republican Jim Bunning won re-election to a second term. Democratic primary frontrunner Paul E. Patton, the governor, saw his career implode in a scandal over an extramarital affair. Eventually, the Democrats settled on Daniel Mongiardo, a relatively unknown doctor and state senator from Hazard, Kentucky.

Democratic primary
Party	Candidate	Votes	%
Democratic	Daniel Mongiardo	142,162	64.92
Democratic	David L. Williams	76,807	35.08
Total votes		218,969	100.00

Republican primary
Party	Candidate	Votes	%
Republican	Jim Bunning (incumbent)	96,545	84.00
Republican	Barry Metcalf	18,395	16.00
Total votes		114,940	100.00

During his re-election bid in 2004, controversy erupted when Bunning described Mongiardo as looking "like one of Saddam Hussein's sons." Bunning apologized, then later went on to declare that Mongiardo's "thugs" had assaulted his wife.

Bunning had an estimated $4 million campaign war chest, while Mongiardo had only $600,000. The Democrats began increasing financial support to Mongiardo when it became apparent that Bunning's bizarre behavior was costing him votes, purchasing more than $800,000 worth of additional television airtime on his behalf.

The November 2 election was one of the closest in Kentucky history. Mongiardo was initially leading, with as many as 80% of the returns coming in. However, Bunning eventually won by just over one percentage point. Some analysts felt that because of President George Bush's 20% margin of victory in the state, Bunning was able to effectively ride the president's coattails to victory.

Kentucky general election
Party	Candidate	Votes	%	±%
Republican	Jim Bunning (incumbent)	873,507	50.66	+0.91%
Democratic	Daniel Mongiardo	850,855	49.34	+0.18%
Turnout		1,724,362		

== Louisiana ==
Louisiana Election
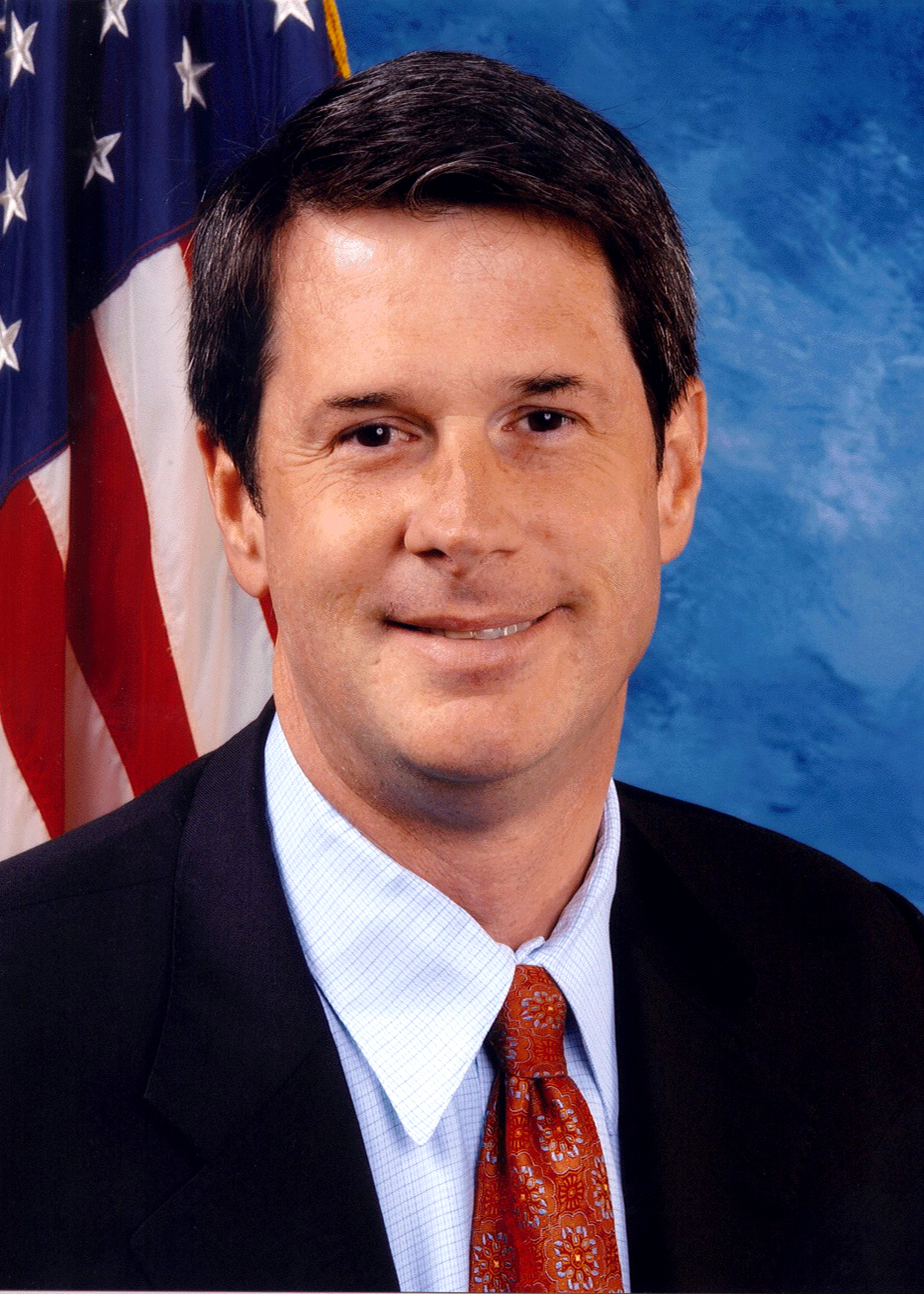

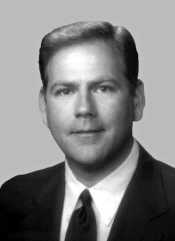

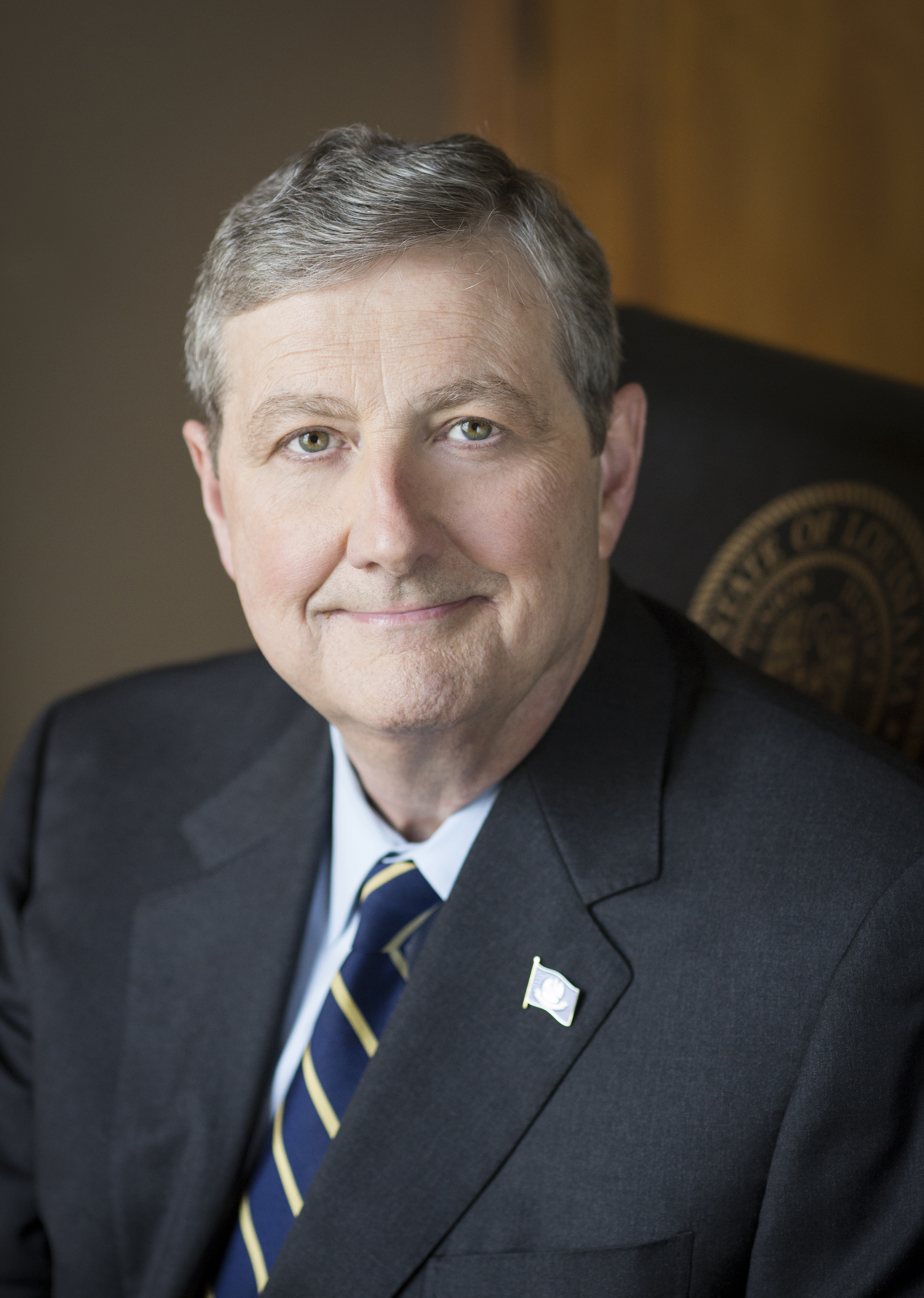
Nominee	David Vitter	Chris John
Party	Republican	Democratic
Popular vote	943,014	542,150
Percentage	51.0%	29.3%
Nominee	John Neely Kennedy
Party	Democratic
Popular vote	275,821
Percentage	14.9%
- Parish results Vitter: 30–40% 40–50% 50–60% 60–70% 70–80% John: 30–40% 40–50% 50–60%
U.S. senator before election
John Breaux
Democratic
Elected U.S. Senator
David Vitter
Republican

Incumbent Democrat John Breaux retired. Republican U.S. representative David Vitter won the jungle primary over Democratic U.S. representative Chris John with 51% of the vote and avoided a runoff.

Breaux endorsed Chris John prior to the jungle primary.

During the campaign, Vitter was accused by a member of the Louisiana Republican State Central Committee of having had a lengthy affair with a prostitute in New Orleans. Vitter responded that the allegation was "absolutely and completely untrue" and that it was "just crass Louisiana politics." The allegation later turned out to be true.

Vitter won the Louisiana jungle primary with 51% of the vote, avoiding the need for a runoff. John received 29.2% of the vote and Kennedy (no relation to the Massachusetts Kennedys) took 14.9%.

Vitter won at least a plurality in 56 of Louisiana's 64 parishes. John carried nine parishes, all but two of which (Iberville and Orleans) are part of the House district he represented.

Kennedy changed parties and ran as Republican in 2008 against Louisiana's senior senator, Democrat Mary Landrieu. Landrieu was re-elected. Kennedy succeeded Vitter when he won the 2016 election for the seat over Democrat Foster Campbell.

Vitter was the first Republican in Louisiana to be popularly elected as a U.S. senator. The previous Republican senator, William Pitt Kellogg, was chosen by the state legislature in 1876, in accordance with the process used before the Seventeenth Amendment to the United States Constitution went into effect in 1914.

2004 Louisiana United States Senate election
Party	Candidate	Votes	%	±%
Republican	David Vitter	943,014	51.03	
Democratic	Chris John	542,150	29.34	
Democratic	John Neely Kennedy	275,821	14.92	
Democratic	Arthur A. Morrell	47,222	2.56	
Independent	Richard M. Fontanesi	15,097	0.82	
Independent	R. A. "Skip" Galan	12,463	0.67	
Democratic	Sam Houston Melton, Jr.	12,289	0.66	
Majority		400,864	21.69	
Turnout		1,848,056		

== Maryland ==
Maryland Election
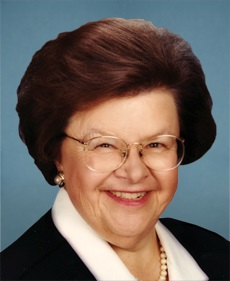

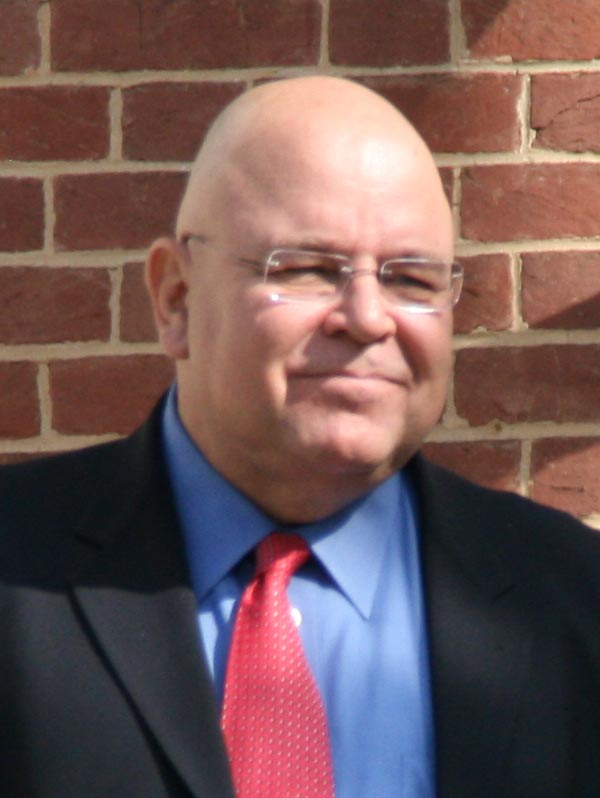
Nominee	Barbara Mikulski	E. J. Pipkin
Party	Democratic	Republican
Popular vote	1,504,691	783,055
Percentage	64.8%	33.7%
- County results Mikulski: 40–50% 50–60% 60–70% 70–80% 80–90% Pipkin: 50–60% 60–70%
U.S. senator before election
Barbara Mikulski
Democratic
Elected U.S. Senator
Barbara Mikulski
Democratic

Incumbent Democrat Barbara Mikulski won re-election to a fourth term over Republican State Senator E. J. Pipkin.

Democratic primary
Party	Candidate	Votes	%
Democratic	Barbara A. Mikulski (incumbent)	408,848	89.88
Democratic	A. Robert Kaufman	32,127	7.06
Democratic	Sid Altman	13,901	3.06
Total votes		454,876	100.00

Republican primary
Party	Candidate	Votes	%
Republican	E. J. Pipkin	70,229	50.58
Republican	John Stafford	14,661	10.56
Republican	Eileen Martin	11,748	8.46
Republican	Dorothy Curry Jennings	10,401	7.49
Republican	Earl S. Gordon	8,233	5.93
Republican	Gene Zarwell	6,865	4.94
Republican	Ray Bly	6,244	4.50
Republican	James A. Kodak	5,328	3.84
Republican	Corrogan R. Vaughn	5,146	3.71
Total votes		138,855	100.00

Maryland general election
Party	Candidate	Votes	%	±%
Democratic	Barbara A. Mikulski (incumbent)	1,504,691	64.80	−5.70%
Republican	E. J. Pipkin	783,055	33.72	+4.23%
Green	Maria Allwine	24,816	1.07	
Constitution	Thomas Trump	9,009	0.39	
Write-ins		360	0.02	
Majority		721,636	31.08	−9.93%
Total votes		2,321,931	100.00	

== Missouri ==
Missouri Election
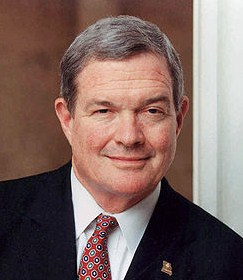

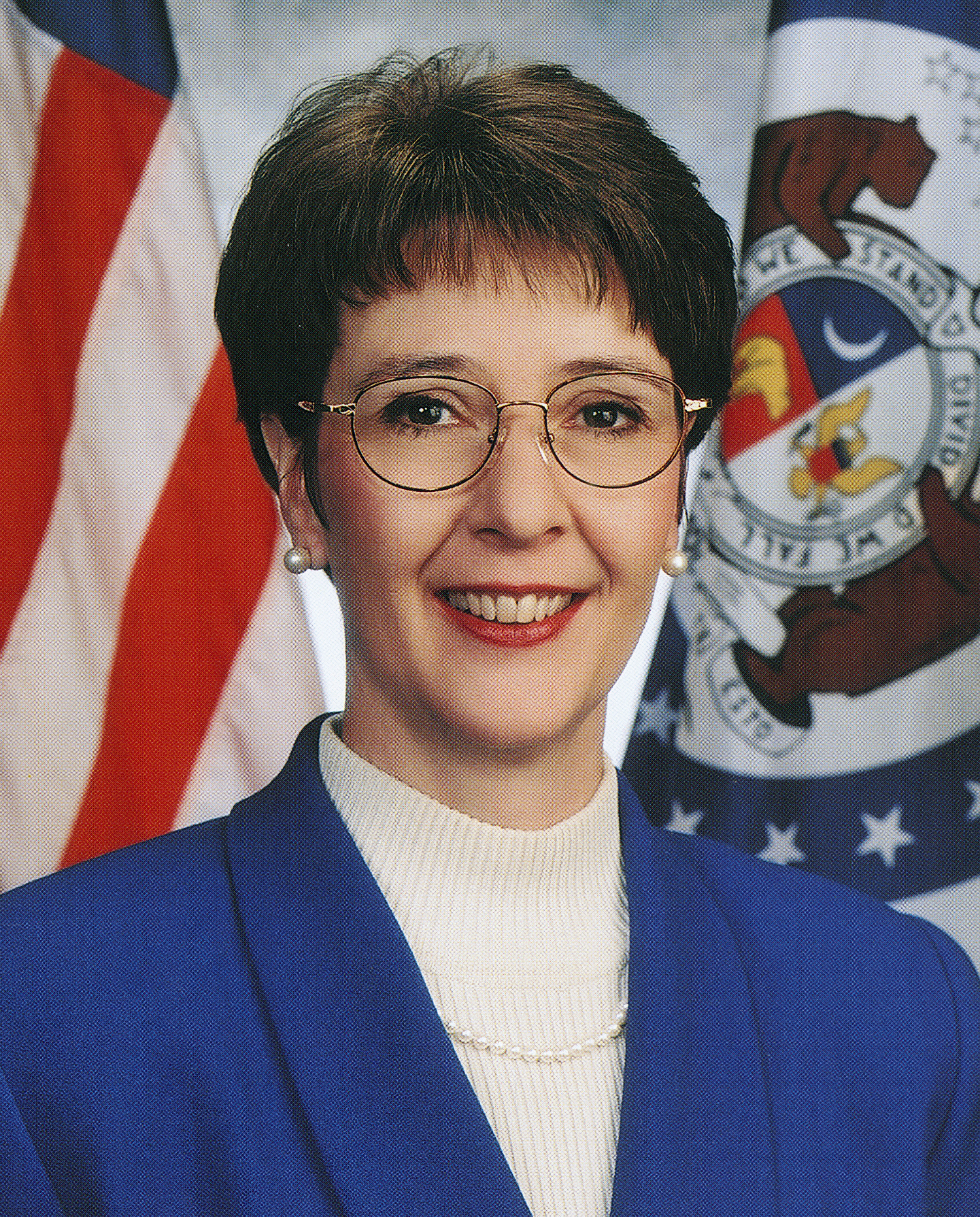
Nominee	Kit Bond	Nancy Farmer
Party	Republican	Democratic
Popular vote	1,518,089	1,158,261
Percentage	56.1%	42.8%
- County results Bond: 50-60% 60-70% 70-80% 80-90% Farmer: 50–60% 70–80%
U.S. senator before election
Kit Bond
Republican
Elected U.S. Senator
Kit Bond
Republican

Incumbent Republican Kit Bond won re-election to a fourth term over Nancy Farmer, state treasurer of Missouri and former Missouri state representative.

Democratic primary
Party	Candidate	Votes	%
Democratic	Nancy Farmer	544,830	73.68
Democratic	Charles Berry	143,229	19.37
Democratic	Ronald Bonar	51,375	6.95
Total votes		739,434	100.00

Libertarian primary
Party	Candidate	Votes	%
Libertarian	Kevin Tull	3,916	100.00
Total votes		3,916	100.00

Republican primary
Party	Candidate	Votes	%
Republican	Kit Bond (incumbent)	541,998	88.08
Republican	Mike Steger	73,354	11.92
Total votes		615,352	100.00

Missouri general election
Party	Candidate	Votes	%	±%
Republican	Kit Bond (incumbent)	1,518,089	56.09	+3.42%
Democratic	Nancy Farmer	1,158,261	42.80	−0.97%
Libertarian	Kevin Tull	19,648	0.73	−1.30%
Constitution	Don Griffin	10,404	0.38	
Majority		359,828	13.30	+4.39%
Turnout		2,706,402		

== Nevada ==
Nevada Election
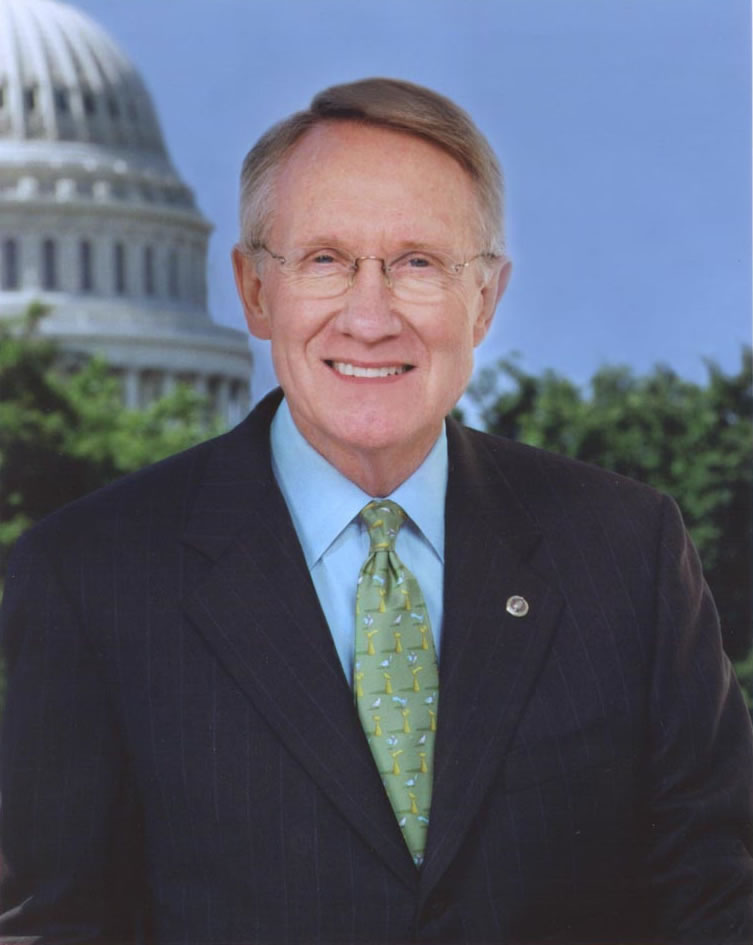

Nominee	Harry Reid	Richard Ziser
Party	Democratic	Republican
Popular vote	494,805	284,640
Percentage	61.0%	35.1%
- County results Reid: 40–50% 50–60% 60–70% Ziser: 40–50% 50–60%
U.S. senator before election
Harry Reid
Democratic
Elected U.S. Senator
Harry Reid
Democratic

Incumbent Democrat Harry Reid, the Senate minority whip, won re-election to a fourth term over Republican anti-gay marriage activist Richard Ziser.

Republican primary
Party	Candidate	Votes	%
Republican	Richard Ziser	40,533	33.50
Republican	Kenneth A. Wegner	21,406	17.69
Republican	Robert Brown	19,553	16.16
Republican	None of these candidates	16,827	13.91
Republican	Royle Melton	10,552	8.72
Republican	Cherie M. Tilley	10,357	8.56
Republican	Carlo Poliak	1,769	1.46
Total votes		120,997	100.00

Nevada general election
Party	Candidate	Votes	%	±%
Democratic	Harry Reid (incumbent)	494,805	61.08	+13.22%
Republican	Richard Ziser	284,640	35.14	−12.63%
None of These Candidates		12,968	1.60	-0.26%
Libertarian	Thomas L. Hurst	9,559	1.18	−0.69%
Independent American Party (Nevada)	David K. Schumann	6,001	0.74	
Natural Law	Gary Marinch	2,095	0.26	−0.38%
Majority		210,165	25.94	+25.85%
Turnout		810,068		

== New Hampshire ==
New Hampshire Election
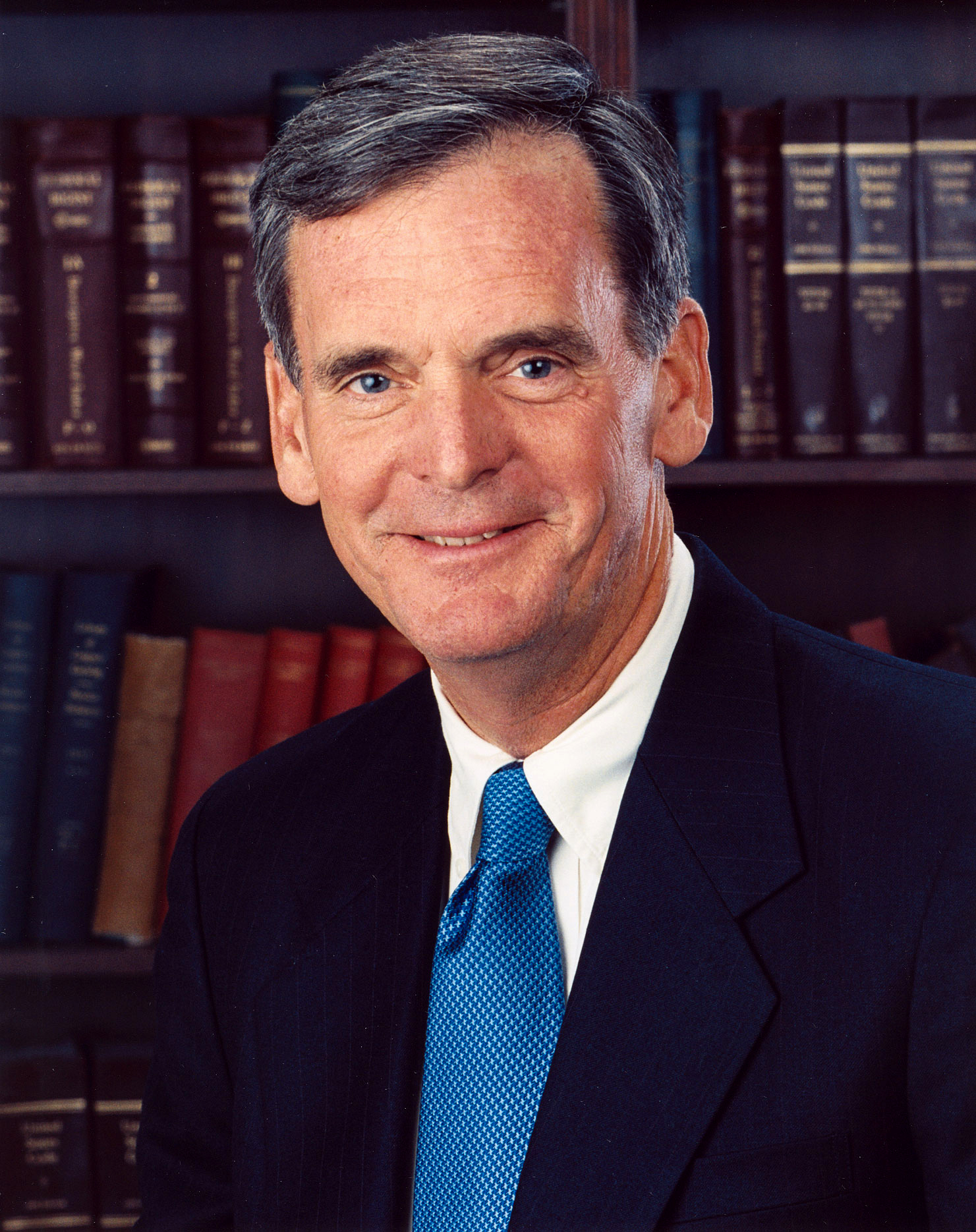

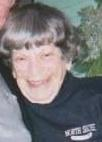
Nominee	Judd Gregg	Doris Haddock
Party	Republican	Democratic
Popular vote	434,847	221,549
Percentage	66.2%	33.7%
- Gregg: 50–60% 60–70% 70–80% 80–90% >90% Haddock: 50–60% 60–70% 80–90% Tie: 50%
U.S. senator before election
Judd Gregg
Republican
Elected U.S. Senator
Judd Gregg
Republican

Incumbent Republican Judd Gregg won re-election to his third term, easily beating Democratic activist Doris Haddock.

NH U.S. Senate election, 2004
Party	Candidate	Votes	%	±%
Republican	Judd Gregg (incumbent)	434,847	66.2	
Democratic	Doris R. Haddock	221,549	33.7	
Libertarian	Ken Blevens	102	0.0	
Total votes		657,086	100.00	

== New York ==
2004 United States Senate election in New York
- November 2, 2004
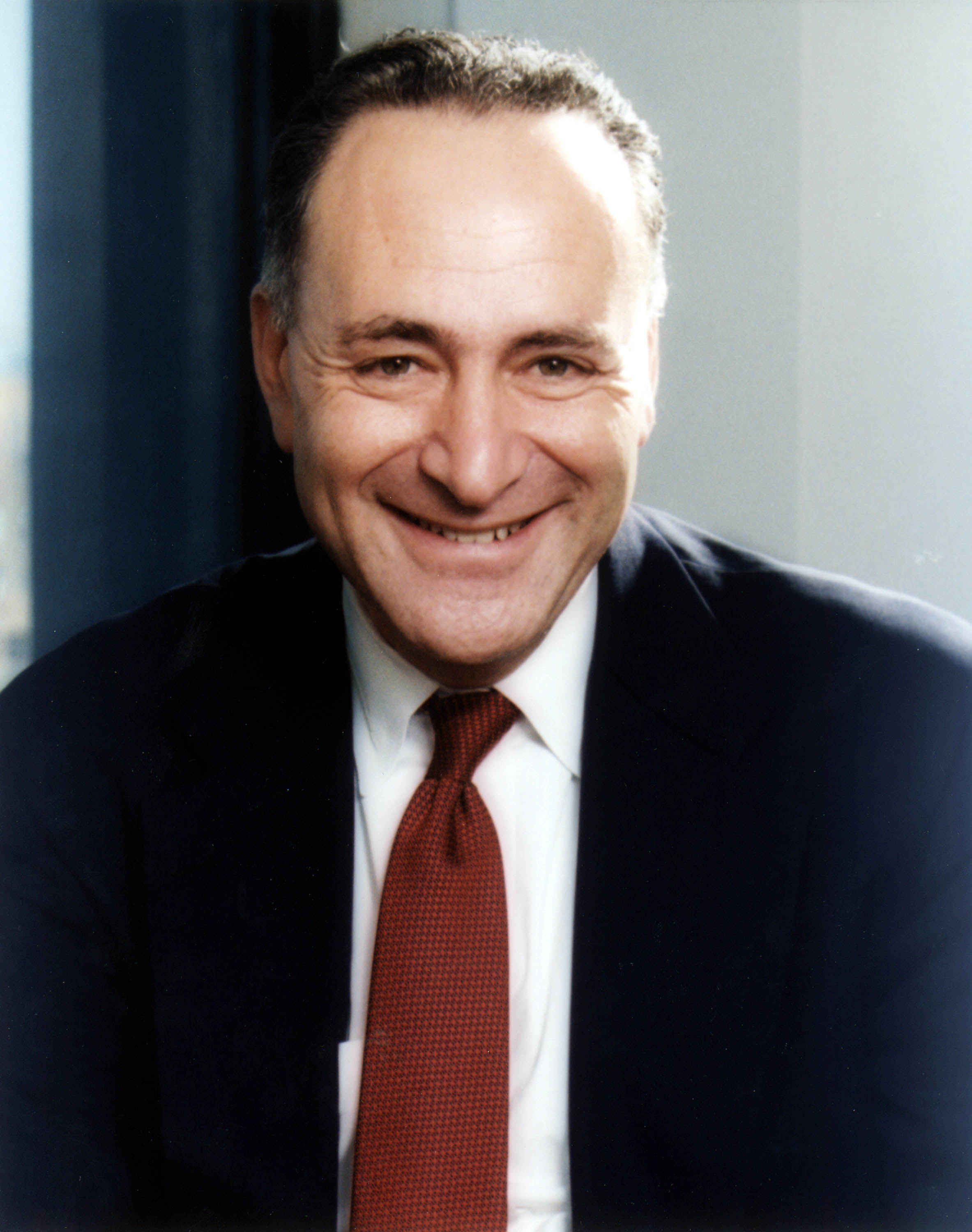

Nominee	Chuck Schumer	Howard Mills
Party	Democratic	Republican
Popular vote	4,769,824	1,625,069
Percentage	71.2%	24.2%
- County results Schumer: 40–50% 50–60% 60–70% 70–80% 80–90% >90% Mills: 50–60%
U.S. senator before election
Chuck Schumer
Democratic
Elected U.S. Senator
Chuck Schumer
Democratic

Incumbent Democrat Chuck Schumer won re-election to his second term, easily beating Republican Howard Mills.

2004 United States Senate election, New York
Party	Candidate	Votes	%	±%
Democratic	Chuck Schumer	4,384,907		
Independence	Chuck Schumer	216,198		
Working Families	Chuck Schumer	168,719		
total	Chuck Schumer (incumbent)	4,769,824	71.2%	
Republican	Howard Mills	1,625,069	24.2%	
Conservative	Marilyn O'Grady	220,960	3.3%	
Green	David McReynolds	36,942	0.3%	
Libertarian	Don Silberger	19,073	0.3%	
Builders Party	Abe Hirschfeld	16,196	0.2%	
Socialist Workers	Martin Koppel	14,811	0.2%	
Majority		3,144,755	46.92%	
Turnout		6,702,875		
Democratic hold		Swing		

== North Carolina ==
North Carolina Election
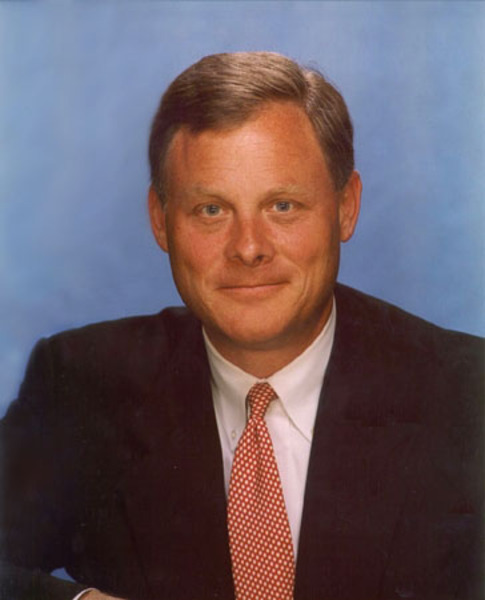

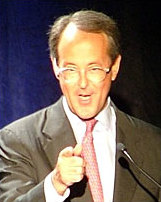
Nominee	Richard Burr	Erskine Bowles
Party	Republican	Democratic
Popular vote	1,791,450	1,632,527
Percentage	51.6%	47.0%
- Burr: 40–50% 50–60% 60–70% 70–80% Bowles: 40–50% 50–60% 60–70%
U.S. senator before election
John Edwards
Democratic
Elected U.S. Senator
Richard Burr
Republican

Incumbent Democrat John Edwards decided to retire from the Senate, ran unsuccessfully for the 2004 Democratic Party presidential nomination, and became his party's vice presidential nominee. Republican Richard Burr won the open seat.

Erskine Bowles won the Democratic Party's nomination unopposed. He had been the party's nominee for the state's other Senate seat in 2002.

Republican primary
Party	Candidate	Votes	%	±%
Republican	Richard Burr	302,319	87.92	N/A
Republican	John Ross Hendrix	25,971	7.55	N/A
Republican	Albert Wiley	15,585	4.53	N/A
Turnout		343,875		

Both major-party candidates engaged in negative campaign tactics, with Bowles' campaign attacking Burr for special interest donations and his positions on trade legislation, and Burr's campaign attacking Bowles for his connections to the Clinton administration. Both attacks had basis in reality: Burr's campaign raised funds from multiple political action committees and at least 72 of the 100 largest Fortune 500 companies, while Bowles departed from the Clinton administration in the midst of the Monica Lewinsky scandal.

Burr won the election by 4%. He joined the Senate in January 2005. Bowles went on to become the president of the UNC system.

North Carolina general election
Party	Candidate	Votes	%	±%
Republican	Richard Burr	1,791,450	51.60	+4.58%
Democratic	Erskine Bowles	1,632,527	47.02	–4.13%
Libertarian	Tom Bailey	47,743	1.38	–0.46%
Nonpartisan	Walker F. Rucker (write-in)	362	0.01	N/A
Turnout		3,471,720		

== North Dakota ==
North Dakota Election
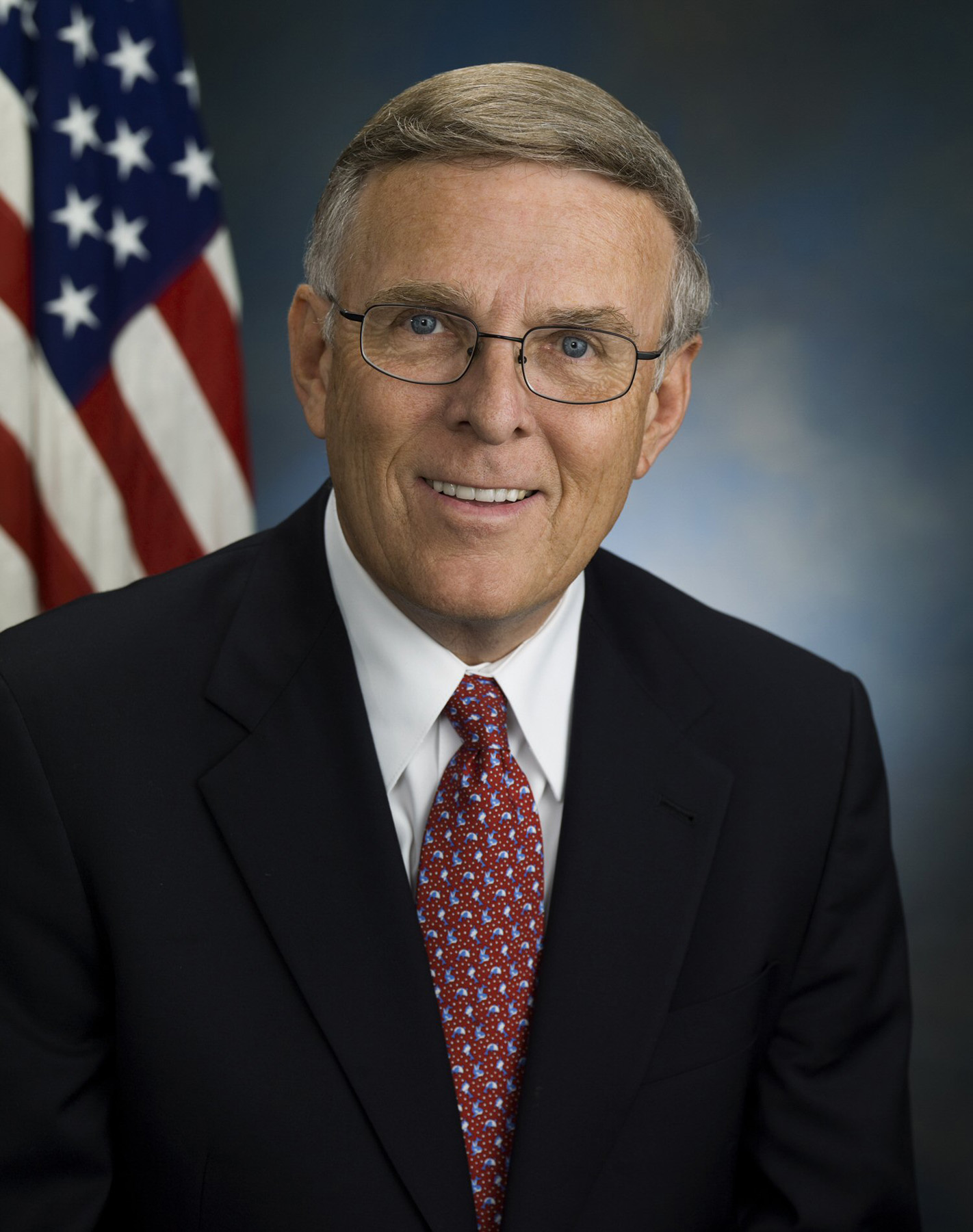

Nominee	Byron Dorgan	Mike Liffrig
Party	Democratic–NPL	Republican
Popular vote	212,143	98,553
Percentage	68.3%	31.7%
- County results Dorgan: 50–60% 60–70% 70–80% 80–90%
U.S. senator before election
Byron Dorgan
Democratic
Elected U.S. Senator
Byron Dorgan
Democratic

Incumbent Democrat Byron Dorgan won re-election to a third term over Republican attorney Mike Liffrig.

2004 United States Senate election in North Dakota
Party	Candidate	Votes	%
Democratic–NPL	Byron Dorgan (incumbent)	149,936	68.28
Republican	Mike Liffrig	98,553	31.72
Total votes		310,696	64.90

== Ohio ==
Ohio Election
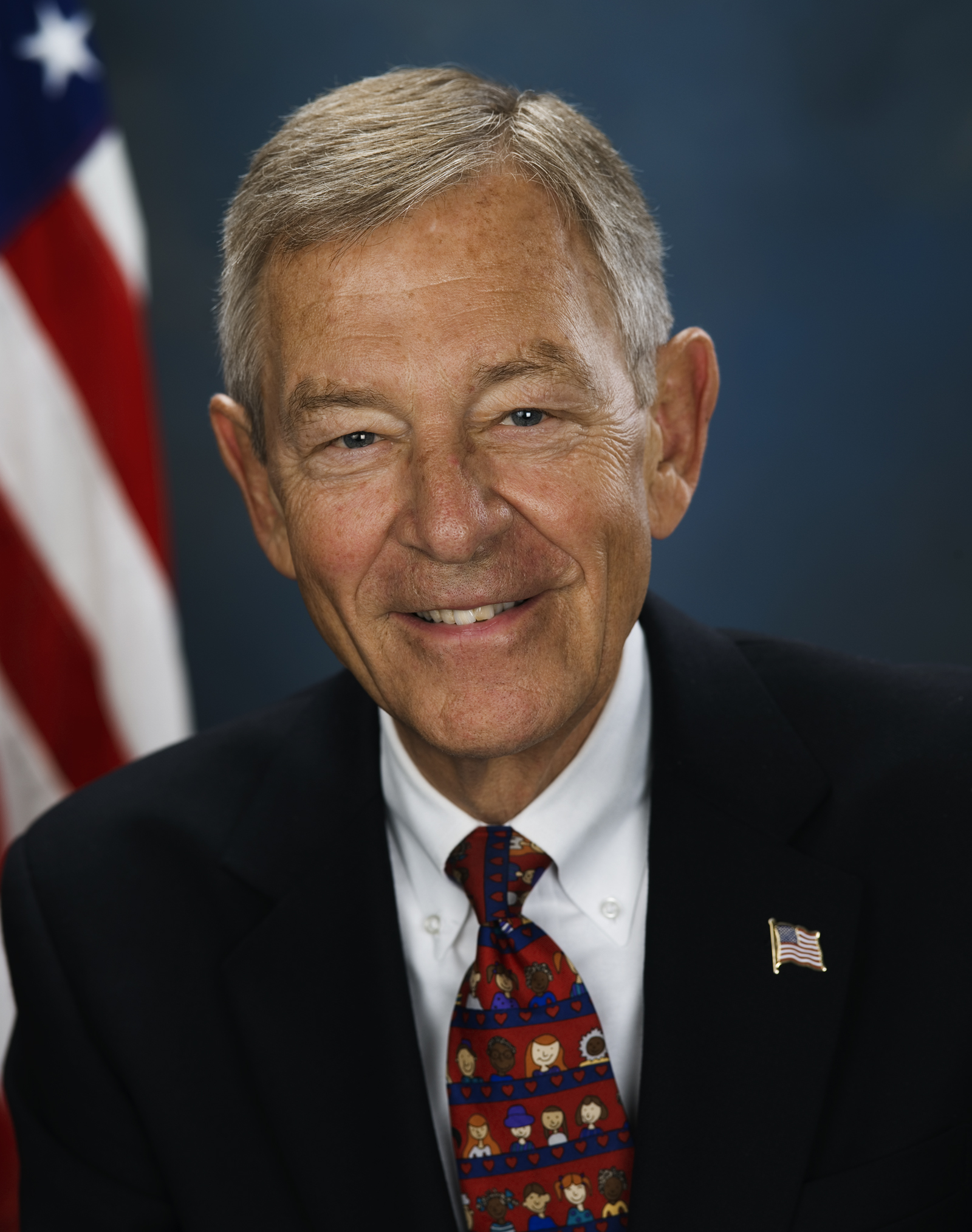

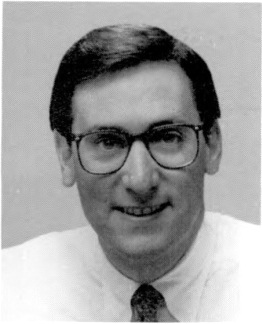
Nominee	George Voinovich	Eric Fingerhut
Party	Republican	Democratic
Popular vote	3,464,651	1,961,249
Percentage	63.9%	36.1%
- Voinovich: 50–60% 60–70% 70–80% 80–90%
U.S. senator before election
George Voinovich
Republican
Elected U.S. Senator
George Voinovich
Republican

Incumbent Republican George Voinovich won re-election to a second term over Democrat Eric Fingerhut, state senator and former U.S. representative from Ohio's 19th congressional district.

Republican primary
Party	Candidate	Votes	%
Republican	George Voinovich (incumbent)	640,082	76.61
Republican	John Mitchel	195,476	23.39
Total votes		835,558	100.00

Democratic primary
Party	Candidate	Votes	%
Democratic	Eric Fingerhut	672,989	70.79
Democratic	Norbert Dennerll	277,721	29.21
Total votes		950,710	100.00

A popular U.S. senator, Voinovich was the heavy favorite to win the election. He had over $9 million in the bank, while his opponent barely had $1.5 million. Fingerhut's campaign was overshadowed by the possible campaign of Democrat and former mayor of Cincinnati Jerry Springer, who eventually declined to run.

Voinovich was considered a moderate on some issues. He supported gun control and amnesty for illegal immigrants.

Surprisingly, Voinovich's biggest advantage was getting support from the most Democratic-leaning county in the state, Cuyahoga County, Ohio. Kerry carried it with almost 67% of the vote, by far his best performance in the state in 2004. It is the home of Cleveland, and is the most populous county in the state. Voinovich was a former mayor of Cleveland. He catered to Cleveland's large Jewish population by visiting Israel six times as a first-term U.S. senator. He also consistently voted for aid to Israel through foreign appropriations bills. He had supported resolutions reaffirming Israel's right to self-defense and condemned Palestinian terrorist attacks. Fingerhut's home base was in the Cleveland area, and therefore he had to cut in through the incumbent's home base in order to even make the election close.

In a September University of Cincinnati poll, the incumbent led 64% to 34%. In an October ABC News poll, Voinovich was winning 60% to 35%. He led across almost all demographic groups. Only Democrats, non-whites, liberals, and those who picked health care as #1 issue favored Fingerhut. The election coincided with the presidential election, where Ohio was a swing state. 27% of Voinovich's supporters preferred U.S. senator John Kerry for president.

Ohio general election
Party	Candidate	Votes	%
Republican	George Voinovich (incumbent)	3,464,651	63.85
Democratic	Eric Fingerhut	1,961,249	36.14
Independent	Helen Meyers	296	0.01
Turnout		5,426,196	100.00

== Oklahoma ==
Oklahoma Election
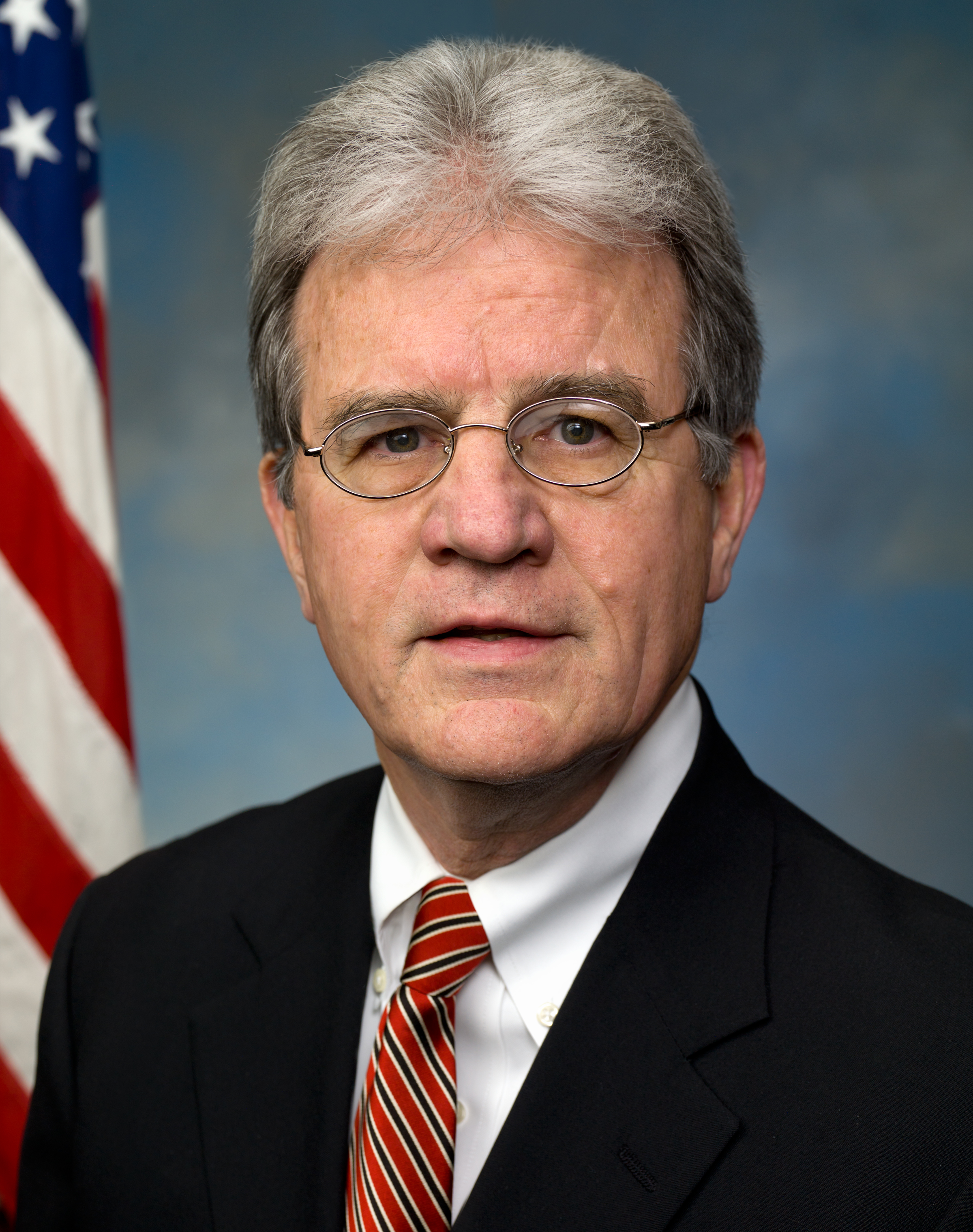

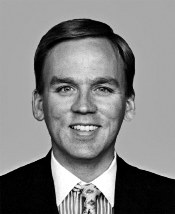

Nominee	Tom Coburn	Brad Carson
Party	Republican	Democratic
Popular vote	763,433	596,750
Percentage	52.8%	41.2%
Nominee	Sheila Bilyeu
Party	Independent
Popular vote	86,663
Percentage	6.0%
- County results Coburn: 40–50% 50–60% 60–70% 70–80% Carson: 40–50% 50–60%
U.S. senator before election
Don Nickles
Republican
Elected U.S. Senator
Tom Coburn
Republican

Incumbent Republican Don Nickles decided to retire instead of seeking a fifth term. Republican nominee Tom Coburn won the open seat, beating Brad Carson, a Democratic U.S. representative.

Democratic primary
Party	Candidate	Votes	%
Democratic	Brad Carson	280,026	79.37
Democratic	Carroll Fisher	28,385	8.05
Democratic	Jim Rogers	20,179	5.72
Democratic	Monte E. Johnson	17,274	4.90
Democratic	W. B. G. Woodson	6,932	1.96
Total votes		352,796	100.00

Kirk Humphreys, the former mayor of Oklahoma City, ran for the United States Senate with institutional conservative support, namely from Senators Don Nickles and Jim Inhofe, as well as former Congressman J. C. Watts. However, Coburn received support from the Club for Growth and conservative activists within Oklahoma. Humphreys noted, "[Coburn is] kind of a cult hero in the conservative portion of our party, not just in Oklahoma. You can't get right of the guy." Much of Coburn's celebrity within the Republican Party came from his tenure in Congress, where he battled House Speaker Newt Gingrich, who he argued was moving the party to the center of the political spectrum due to their excessive federal spending. Coburn's maverick nature culminated itself in 2000 when he backed conservative activist Alan Keyes for president rather than George W. Bush or John McCain.

Ultimately, Coburn triumphed over Humphreys, Anthony, and Hunt in the primary, winning every county in Oklahoma except for tiny Harmon County.

Republican primary
Party	Candidate	Votes	%
Republican	Tom Coburn	145,974	61.23
Republican	Kirk Humphreys	59,877	25.12
Republican	Bob Anthony	29,596	12.41
Republican	Jay Richard Hunt	2,944	1.23
Total votes		238,391	100.00

Carson and Coburn engaged each other head-on in one of the year's most brutal Senate contests. Coburn and the National Republican Senatorial Committee attacked Carson for being too liberal for Oklahoma, and for being a vote in lockstep with John Kerry, Hillary Clinton, and Ted Kennedy. To drive the point home, one Coburn television ad accused Carson of being "dangerously liberal" and not supporting the war on terrorism. Coburn was aided in this effort by the fact that the Kerry campaign did not contest the state of Oklahoma and that incumbent president George W. Bush was expected to win Oklahoma comfortably. This was compounded by the fact that Vice-President Dick Cheney campaigned for Coburn and appeared in several television advertisements for him. Carson countered by emphasizing his Stilwell roots and his moderation, specifically, bringing attention to the fact that he fought for greater governmental oversight of nursing home care for the elderly. Carson responded to the attacks against him by countering that his opponent had committed Medicaid fraud years prior, in an event that reportedly left a woman sterilized without her consent. Ultimately, however, Carson was not able to overcome Oklahoma's conservative nature and Senator Kerry's abysmal performance in Oklahoma, and he was defeated by Coburn by 11.5%. As of 2022, the result remains the closest the Democrats have come to winning a Senate election in Oklahoma since Republican Don Nickles was first elected to the Senate by 8.7% in 1980.

2004 United States Senate election in Oklahoma
Party	Candidate	Votes	%	±%
Republican	Tom Coburn	763,433	52.77	−13.62%
Democratic	Brad Carson	596,750	41.24	+9.97%
Independent	Sheila Bilyeu	86,663	5.99	
Majority		166,683	11.52	−23.58%
Turnout		1,446,846		

== Oregon ==
Oregon Election
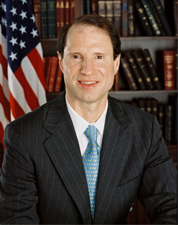

Nominee	Ron Wyden	Al King
Party	Democratic	Republican
Popular vote	1,128,728	565,254
Percentage	63.4%	31.8%
- County results Wyden: 40–50% 50–60% 60–70% 70–80% King: 40–50% 50–60%
U.S. senator before election
Ron Wyden
Democratic
Elected U.S. Senator
Ron Wyden
Democratic

Incumbent Democrat Ron Wyden won re-election to a second full term over Republican rancher Al King.

Oregon general election
Party	Candidate	Votes	%	±%
Democratic	Ron Wyden (incumbent)	1,128,728	63.39	+2.34%
Republican	Al King	565,254	31.75	−2.04%
Pacific Green	Teresa Keane	43,053	2.41	+0.44%
Libertarian	Dan Fitzgerald	29,582	1.66	+0.03%
Constitution	David Brownlow	12,397	0.70	+0.70%
Write-In	Misc.	1,536	0.08	−0.05%
Majority		563,474	31.64	+5.90%
Turnout		1,780,550		

== Pennsylvania ==
Pennsylvania Election
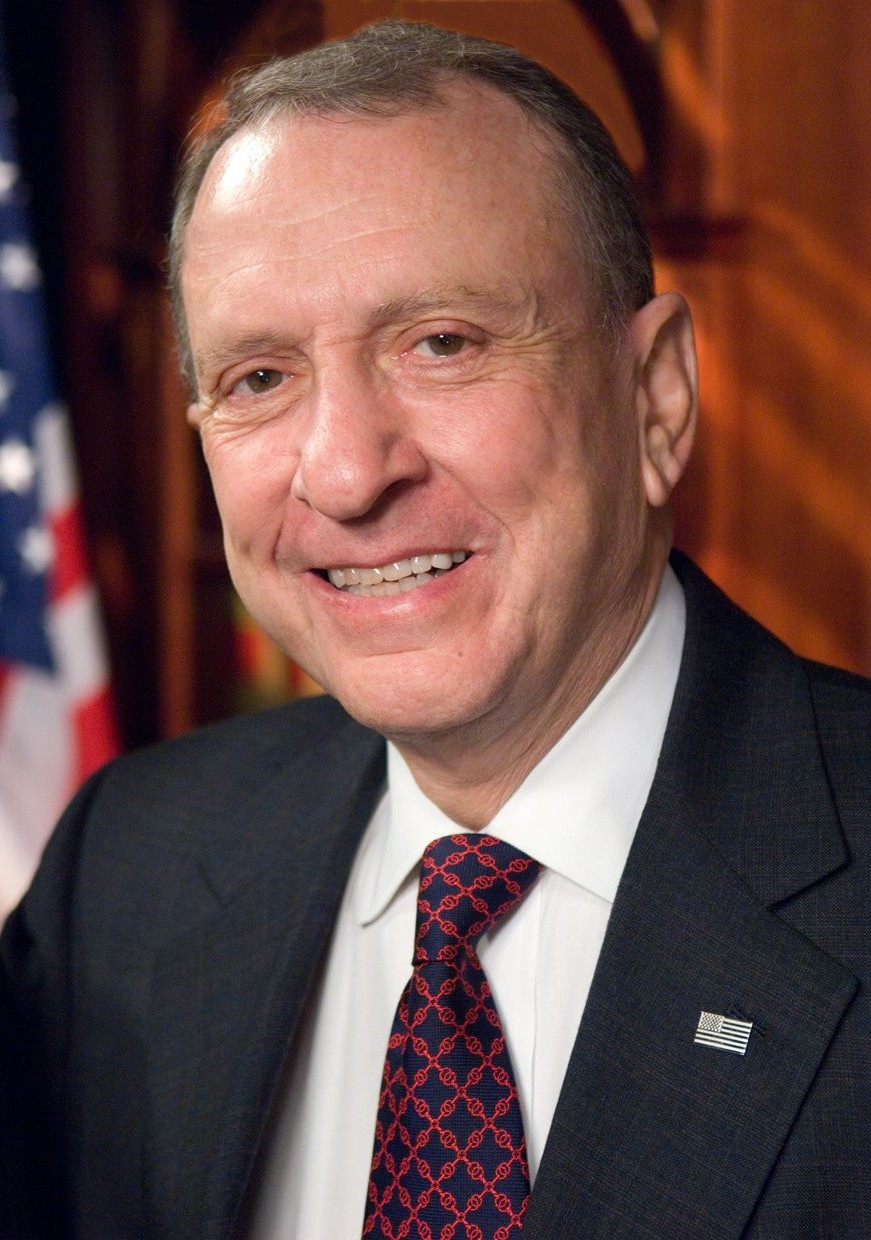

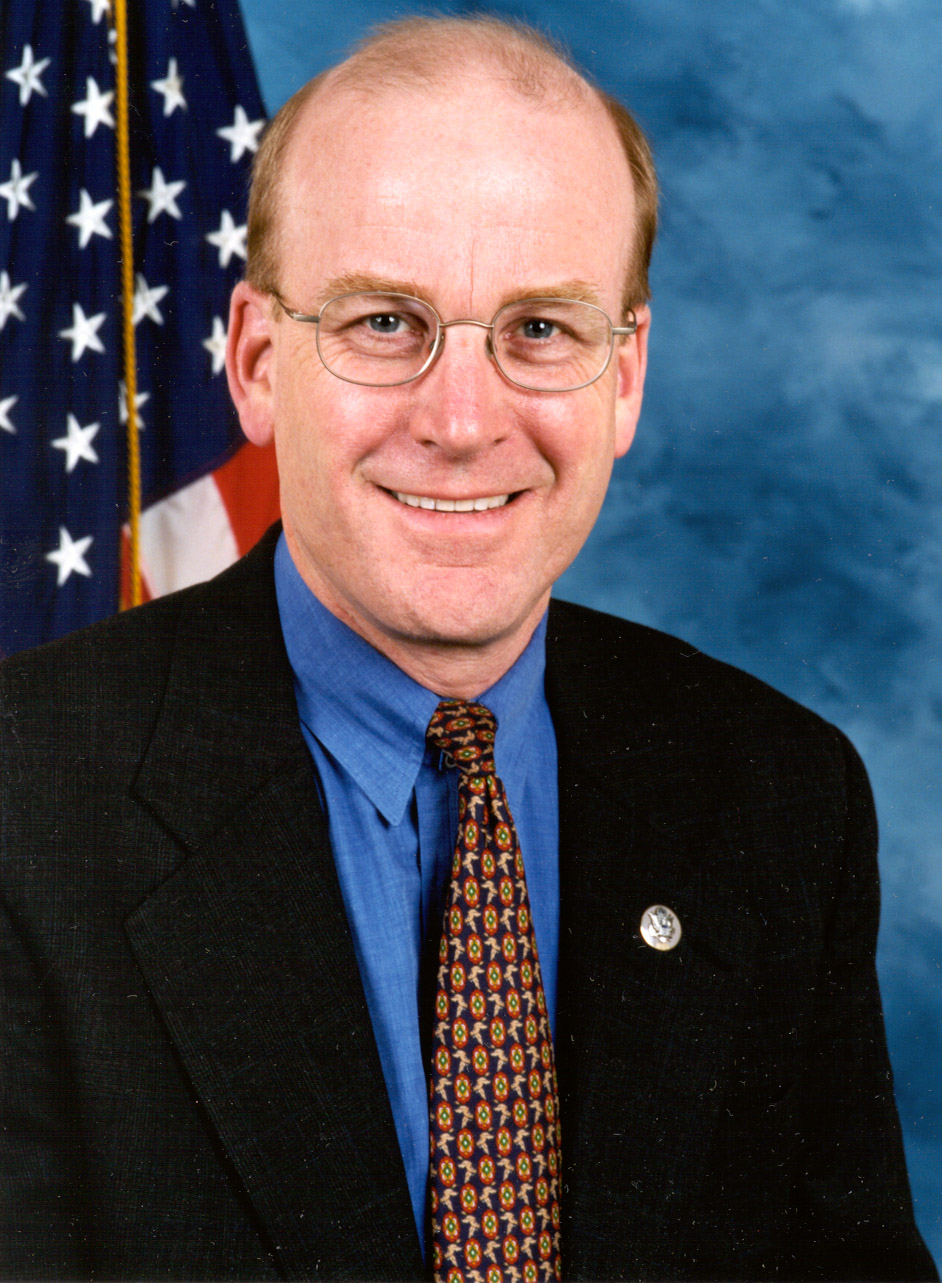
Nominee	Arlen Specter	Joe Hoeffel
Party	Republican	Democratic
Popular vote	2,925,080	2,334,126
Percentage	52.6%	41.9%
- County results Specter: 40–50% 50–60% 60–70% 70–80% Hoeffel: 40–50% 70–80%
U.S. senator before election
Arlen Specter
Republican
Elected U.S. Senator
Arlen Specter
Republican

Incumbent Republican Arlen Specter won re-election to a fifth term.

Democrats had difficulty recruiting top tier candidates against the popular Specter. Among the Democrats to decline to run for the nomination were Treasurer (and former Republican) Barbara Hafer, Public Utilities Commissioner John Hanger, real estate mogul Howard Hanna, State Representative (and also former Republican) John Lawless, and State Senator (and future Congresswoman) Allyson Schwartz.

Congressman Hoeffel ended up running unopposed for the Democratic nomination. Software businessman Charlie Crystle was considered a strong possible candidate, but he dropped out before the election.

Democratic primary election
Party	Candidate	Votes	%	±%
Democratic	Joe Hoeffel	595,816	100.00	

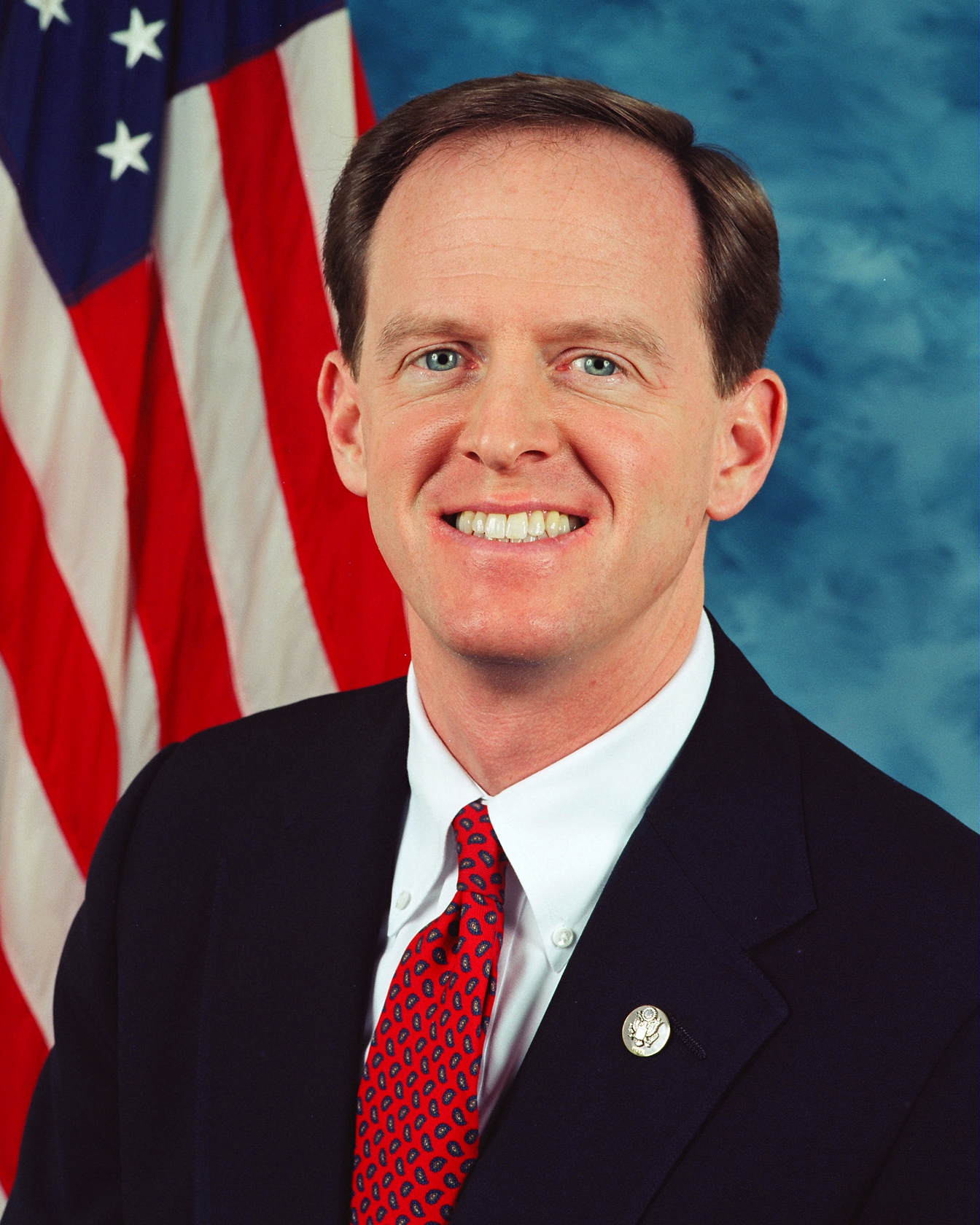
U.S. Representative Pat Toomey

GOP Primary results by county Specter: 50–60%; 60–70%; Toomey: 50–60%; 60–70%

Specter faced a primary challenge from U.S. representative Pat Toomey. Despite the state Republican Party's strong history of embracing a moderate philosophy, the influence of conservatism among rank-and-file members had been steadily growing for decades; because of his liberal social views, Specter was often considered to be a "Republican in Name Only" by the right. Although Specter had a huge fundraising advantage, Toomey was aided by $2 million of advertising from the Club for Growth, a conservative political action committee that focuses on fiscal issues and targets moderate Republican incumbents. Toomey criticized Specter as a spendthrift on economic policy and as out of touch with his own party on social issues. Although Toomey had difficulty with name recognition early in the campaign, he built huge momentum over the final weeks preceding the primary, and Specter appeared to have transitioned from having a comfortable lead to being behind his challenger.

Specter received a huge boost from the vocal support of President George W. Bush; most of the state's Republican establishment also closed ranks behind Specter. This included Pennsylvania's other U.S. senator, Rick Santorum, who was noted for his social conservative views. Multiple Republicans at the state and national level feared that if Toomey beat Specter, he would not be able to defend the seat against his Democratic opponent.

Republican primary
Party	Candidate	Votes	%	±%
Republican	Arlen Specter (incumbent)	530,839	50.82	
Republican	Pat Toomey	513,693	49.18	

For Democrats, hope of winning the election centered on Toomey's defeat of Specter. However, after the challenge from the right failed, enthusiasm from the party establishment waned and Hoeffel had difficulty matching the name recognition and fundraising power of his opponent Despite contempt from conservatives, Specter enjoyed high levels of support from independent voters and, as in previous elections, a surprisingly large crossover from Democratic voters. Even in the areas in which Toomey performed best in the Republican primary (mainly the state's conservative, rural center), Specter performed well. Except for his large margin of victory in almost uniformly Democratic Philadelphia, Hoeffel was crushed at the polls; his only other wins came by close margins in three metro Pittsburgh counties; although President Bush proved to be unpopular in the state, voters were not willing to abandon Specter over party affiliation. Toomey would go on to be elected in the U.S. Senate in 2010.

Pennsylvania general election
Party	Candidate	Votes	%	±%
Republican	Arlen Specter (incumbent)	2,925,080	52.62	
Democratic	Joe Hoeffel	2,334,126	41.99	
Constitution	Jim Clymer	220,056	3.96	
Libertarian	Betsy Summers	79,263	1.43	
Total votes		5,559,105	100.00	

== South Carolina ==
South Carolina Election
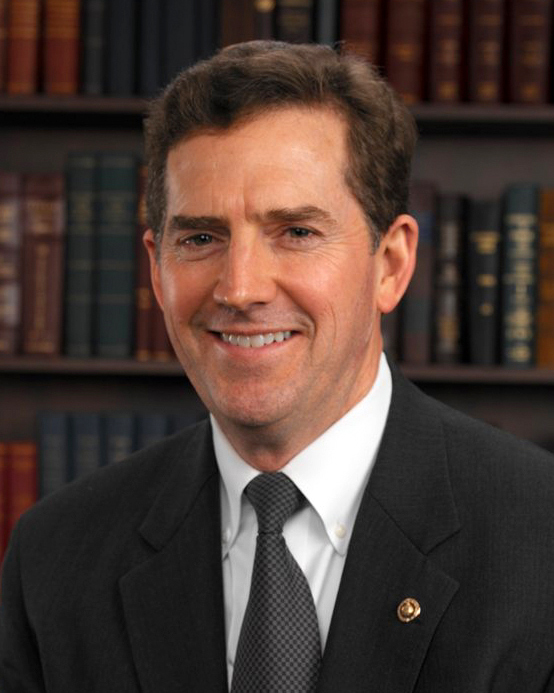

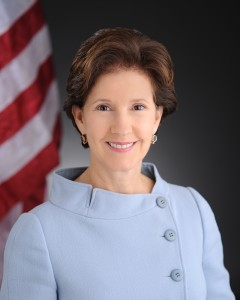
Nominee	Jim DeMint	Inez Tenenbaum
Party	Republican	Democratic
Popular vote	857,167	704,384
Percentage	53.7%	44.1%
- County results DeMint: 40–50% 50–60% 60–70% Tenenbaum: 40–50% 50–60% 60–70% 70–80%
U.S. senator before election
Fritz Hollings
Democratic
Elected U.S. Senator
Jim DeMint
Republican

Incumbent Democrat Fritz Hollings decided to retire. Jim DeMint, a Republican U.S. representative won the open seat over Democrat Inez Tenenbaum, the South Carolina superintendent of education.

Democratic primary
Party	Candidate	Votes	%
Democratic	Inez Tenenbaum	126,720	75.5
Democratic	Ben Frasier	41,070	24.5

The Senate election two years earlier in 2002 did not have a primary election because the South Carolina Republicans were more preoccupied with the gubernatorial contest, despite having the first open Senate seat in 40 years. The retirement of Democratic Senator Fritz Hollings gave the Republicans an opportunity to pick up the seat and with no other interesting positions up for election in 2004, a crowded field developed in the Republican primary. Furthermore, the Republicans were motivated by having President Bush at the top of the ticket, enabling them to ride his coattails to victory.

Former governor David Beasley, from the Pee Dee, entered the race and quickly emerged as the frontrunner because of his support from the evangelical voters. However, during his term as governor from 1994 to 1998 he had greatly angered the electorate by proposing to remove the Confederate Naval Jack from the dome of the statehouse, and by opposing the adoption of a state lottery to provide for college scholarships. Both positions led to the loss of his re-election in 1998, and the issues continued to trouble him in the Senate race.

The battle for second place in the primary was between Upstate Congressman Jim DeMint and Charleston developer Thomas Ravenel. DeMint was able to squeak out a second-place finish because Charlie Condon, a former attorney general of South Carolina, split the Lowcountry vote, with Ravenel thus providing DeMint the margin he needed. In addition, while a number of voters were attracted to the Ravenel campaign and felt that he had a future in politics, they believed that he should set his sights on a less high-profile office first before trying to become senator. Resigned to defeat, Ravenel endorsed DeMint in the runoff election.

In the runoff election on June 22, 2004, DeMint scored a surprising victory over Beasley. Ravenel's endorsement of DeMint proved crucial as the Lowcountry counties heavily went for the representative from the Upstate. Also, Beasley had burned too many bridges while governor and was unable to increase his share of the vote in the runoff.

Republican primary election
Candidate	Votes	%
David Beasley	107,847	36.6%
Jim DeMint	77,567	26.3%
Thomas Ravenel	73,167	24.8%
Charlie Condon	27,694	9.4%
Mark McBride	6,479	2.2%
Orly Benny Davis	1,915	0.7%

Republican primary election runoff
Candidate	Votes	%	±%
Jim DeMint	154,644	59.2%	+32.9%
David Beasley	106,480	40.8%	+4.2%

DeMint entered the general election campaign severely weakened from the primary fight, having spent most of his campaign funds. He stressed to the voters that he would follow conservative principles and provide an important Republican vote in the closely divided Senate. Democrats fared poorly in statewide elections in South Carolina, so Tenenbaum tried to make the race about issues rather than party identification. She attacked DeMint's support of the FairTax proposal because it would increase the sales tax by 23%. The election victory by DeMint merely cemented South Carolina's shift to the Republican column, as the best candidate the Democrats could offer was soundly defeated by the typical 10 point margin.

South Carolina U.S. Senate election, 2004
Party	Candidate	Votes	%	±%
Republican	Jim DeMint	857,167	53.6	+7.9%
Democratic	Inez Tenenbaum	704,384	44.1	−8.6%
Constitution	Patrick Tyndall	13,464	0.8	+0.8%
Libertarian	Rebekah E. Sutherland	10,678	0.7	−0.9%
United Citizens Party	Tee Ferguson	5,859	0.4	+0.4%
Green	Efia Nwangaza*	4,245	0.3	+0.3%
No party	Write-Ins	1,286	0.1	+0.1%
Majority		152,783	9.5	+2.5%
Turnout		1,597,221	69.0	+16.2%

- Efia Nwangaza ran under the Independence Party in Aiken and Calhoun counties; her totals are combined.

== South Dakota ==
South Dakota Election
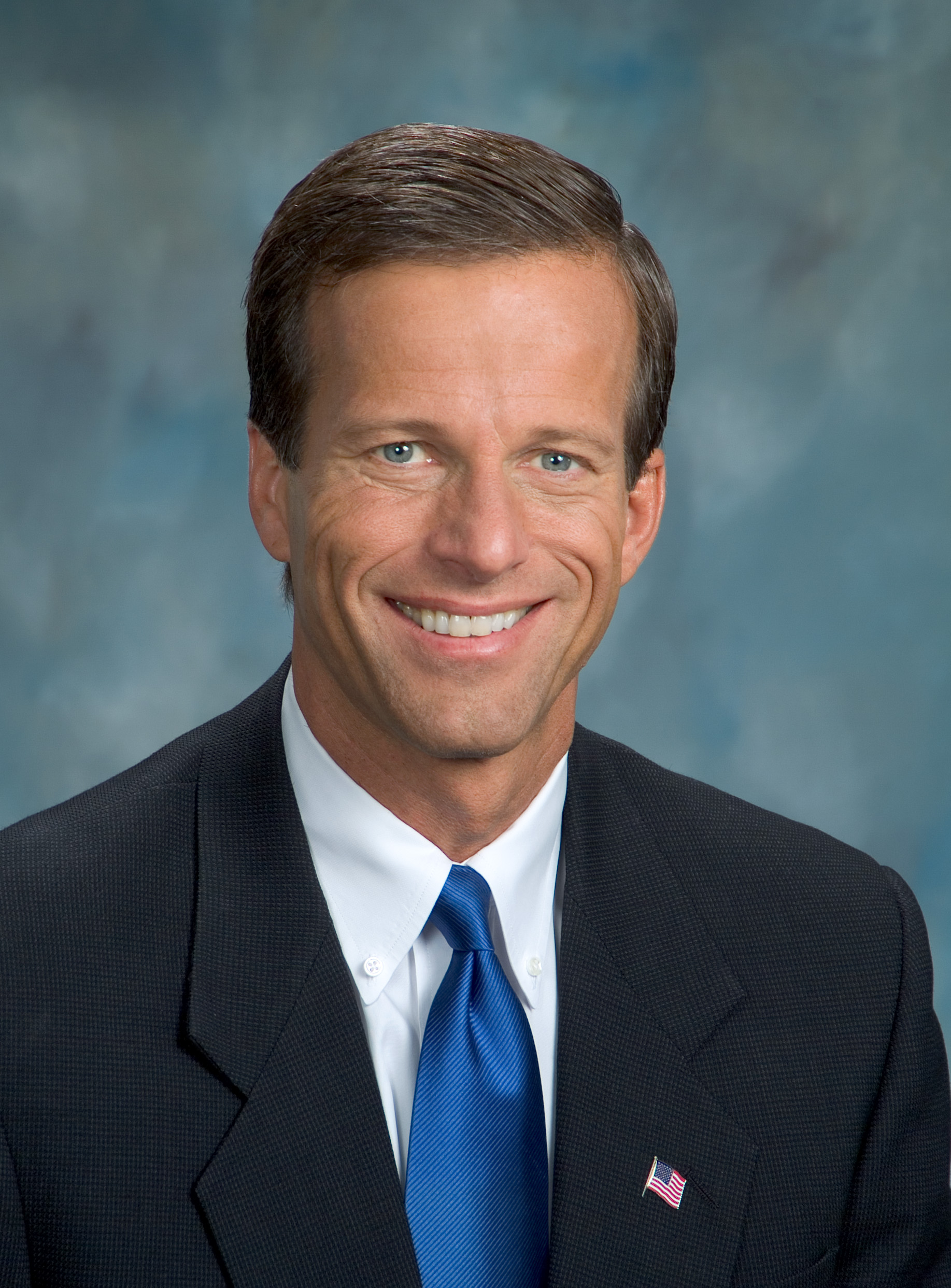

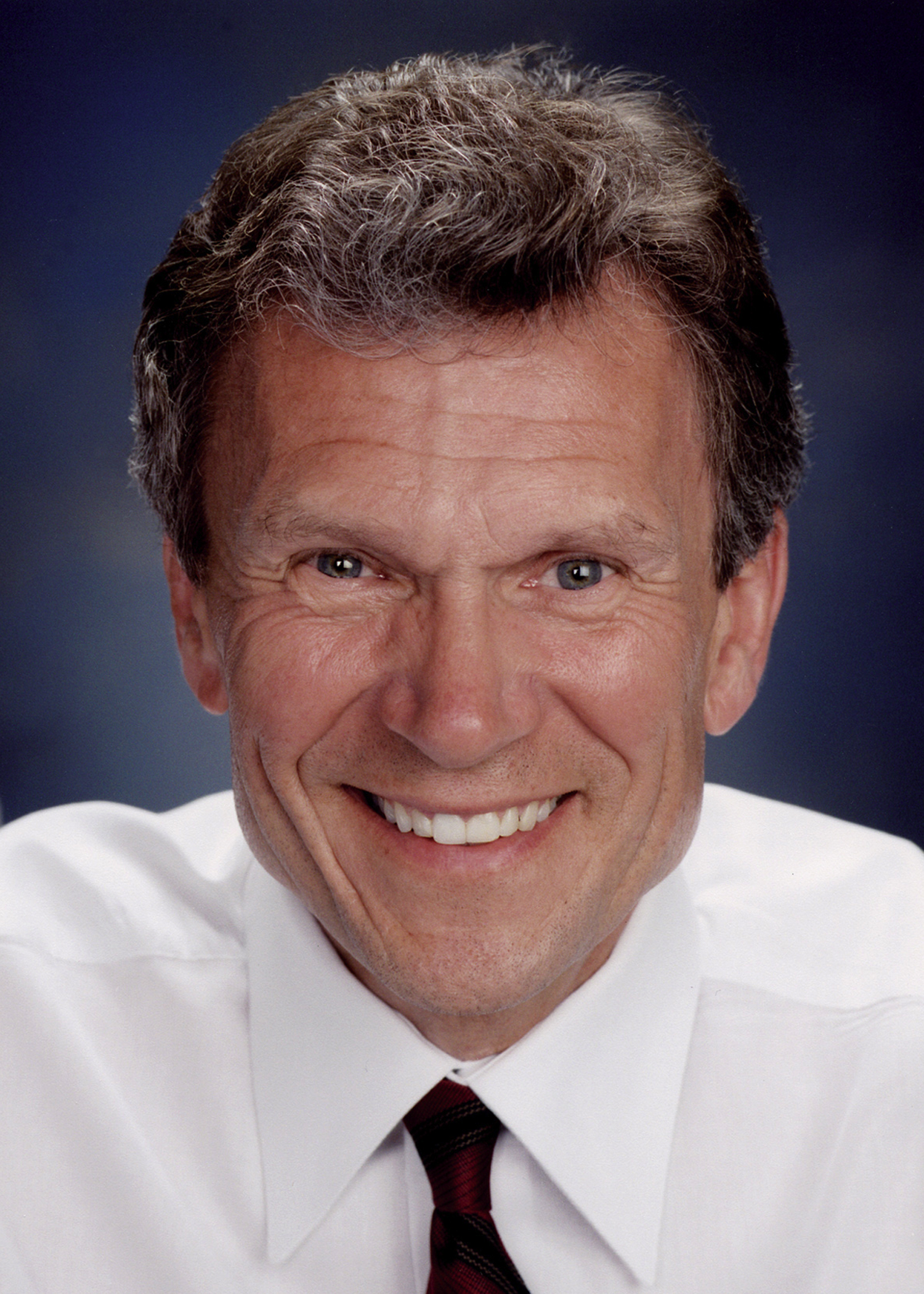
Nominee	John Thune	Tom Daschle
Party	Republican	Democratic
Popular vote	197,848	193,340
Percentage	50.6%	49.4%
- County results Thune: 50–60% 60–70% 70–80% Daschle: 50–60% 60–70% 70–80% 80–90%
U.S. senator before election
Tom Daschle
Democratic
Elected U.S. Senator
John Thune
Republican

In the 2004 congressional elections, Daschle lost his seat to Republican challenger and former U.S. representative John Thune in a bitterly contested battle. Thune prevailed by a narrow 50.6–49.4% margin, of 4,508 votes. Senate Majority Leader Bill Frist visited South Dakota to campaign for Thune, breaking an unwritten tradition that one party's leader in the Senate would not campaign directly for the other's defeat. Daschle's loss resulted in the first defeat of a Senate floor leader since 1952 when Arizona Senator Ernest McFarland lost his seat to Barry Goldwater. Daschle's Senate term expired on January 3, 2005.

Throughout the campaign, Thune, along with Frist, President Bush, and Vice President Cheney, frequently accused Daschle of being the "chief obstructionist" of Bush's agenda and charged him with using filibusters to block confirmation of several of Bush's nominees to the federal judiciary. Thune also used moral values such as issues surrounding same-sex marriage and abortion to convince South Dakota voters that Daschle's positions on such topics were out of sync with the state's residents. The Republican candidate also drove home his strong support for the president while blasting Daschle for his vehement opposition to Bush. He attempted to sway voters by remembering that Bush won South Dakota in a landslide in 2000 and had a high job-approval rating among South Dakotans. His opponent, the minority leader, repeatedly argued that he was funneling money into South Dakota for vital federal highway and water pet projects.

Daschle responded to Thune's claim that he was a partisan anti-Bush obstructionist by pointing to his action just nine days after the September 11 attacks when he hugged President Bush on the Senate floor following Bush's address to Congress and the nation. He also hit back by alleging that Thune wanted to "rubber stamp what the administration is doing." Daschle's use of the video of his embrace of Bush forced the Republican National Committee to demand that the ad be pulled, claiming that it suggests that Bush endorses Daschle. Shortly following the airing of the ad, in a nationally televised debate on NBC's Meet the Press, Thune accused Daschle of "emboldening the enemy" in his skepticism of the Iraq War.

Daschle also noticeably relied heavily on the power of incumbency to win a fourth term. Some also argued that Stephanie Herseth's election to the state's only House seat hurt Daschle, as voters may not have been comfortable sending an all-Democratic delegation to Congress for the first time in decades. Accusations that Daschle was possibly considering no longer being an official resident of South Dakota were believed to have offended voters there. Others have analyzed that Daschle's lengthy consideration and eventual rejection of a potential run for the presidency in 2004 took a toll on South Dakotans, who felt betrayed and used by Daschle as a result.

When the race began in early 2004, Daschle led by 7 points in January and February. By May, his lead shrank to just 2 points, and into the summer polls showed a varying number of trends: either Daschle held a slim 1- to 2-point lead, Thune held a slim 1- to 2-point lead, or the race was tied. Throughout September, Daschle led Thune by margins of 2 to 5 percent while during the entire month of October into the November 2 election, most polls showed that Thune and Daschle were dead even, usually tied 49–49 among likely voters. Some polls showed either Thune or Daschle leading by extremely slim margins.

Thune was an aide to former senator James Abdnor, the man Daschle defeated in 1986 to gain his seat in the Senate.

Daschle spent a great deal of time and energy campaigning for his fellow Democrat Tim Johnson in 2002, who barely defeated Thune by 524 votes. He argued that by re-electing Johnson, South Dakota would be better off because Johnson would help to keep Daschle Majority Leader. However, in the end, while Johnson won, other states voted for enough Republicans that Daschle was no longer majority leader. Furthermore, Thune's whisker-close defeat in 2002 freed him up to run against Daschle in 2004. Had Daschle not put his considerable weight to re-electing Johnson, it seems likely that Thune would have beaten Johnson, leaving Daschle without a strong challenger for the upcoming election and making his re-election a certainty.

South Dakota general election
Party	Candidate	Votes	%	±%
Republican	John Thune	197,848	50.58	+14.17%
Democratic	Tom Daschle (incumbent)	193,340	49.42	−12.72%
Majority		4,508	1.15	−24.58%
Turnout		391,188		

== Utah ==
Utah Election
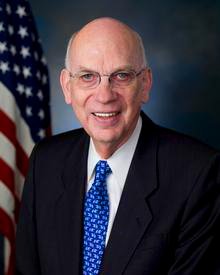

Nominee	Bob Bennett	Paul Van Dam
Party	Republican	Democratic
Popular vote	626,640	258,955
Percentage	68.7%	28.4%
- County results Bennett: 50–60% 60–70% 70–80% 80–90%
U.S. senator before election
Bob Bennett
Republican
Elected U.S. Senator
Bob Bennett
Republican

Incumbent Republican Bob Bennett won re-election to a third term easily beating Democrat Paul Van Dam, former attorney general of Utah and former Salt Lake County district attorney.

Utah general election
Party	Candidate	Votes	%	±%
Republican	Bob Bennett (incumbent)	626,640	68.73	+4.75%
Democratic	Paul Van Dam	258,955	28.40	−4.57%
Constitution	Gary R. Van Horn	17,289	1.90	
Personal Choice	Joe LaBonte	8,824	0.97	
Write-ins		18	0.00	
Majority		367,685	40.33	+9.32%
Turnout		911,726		

== Vermont ==
Vermont Election
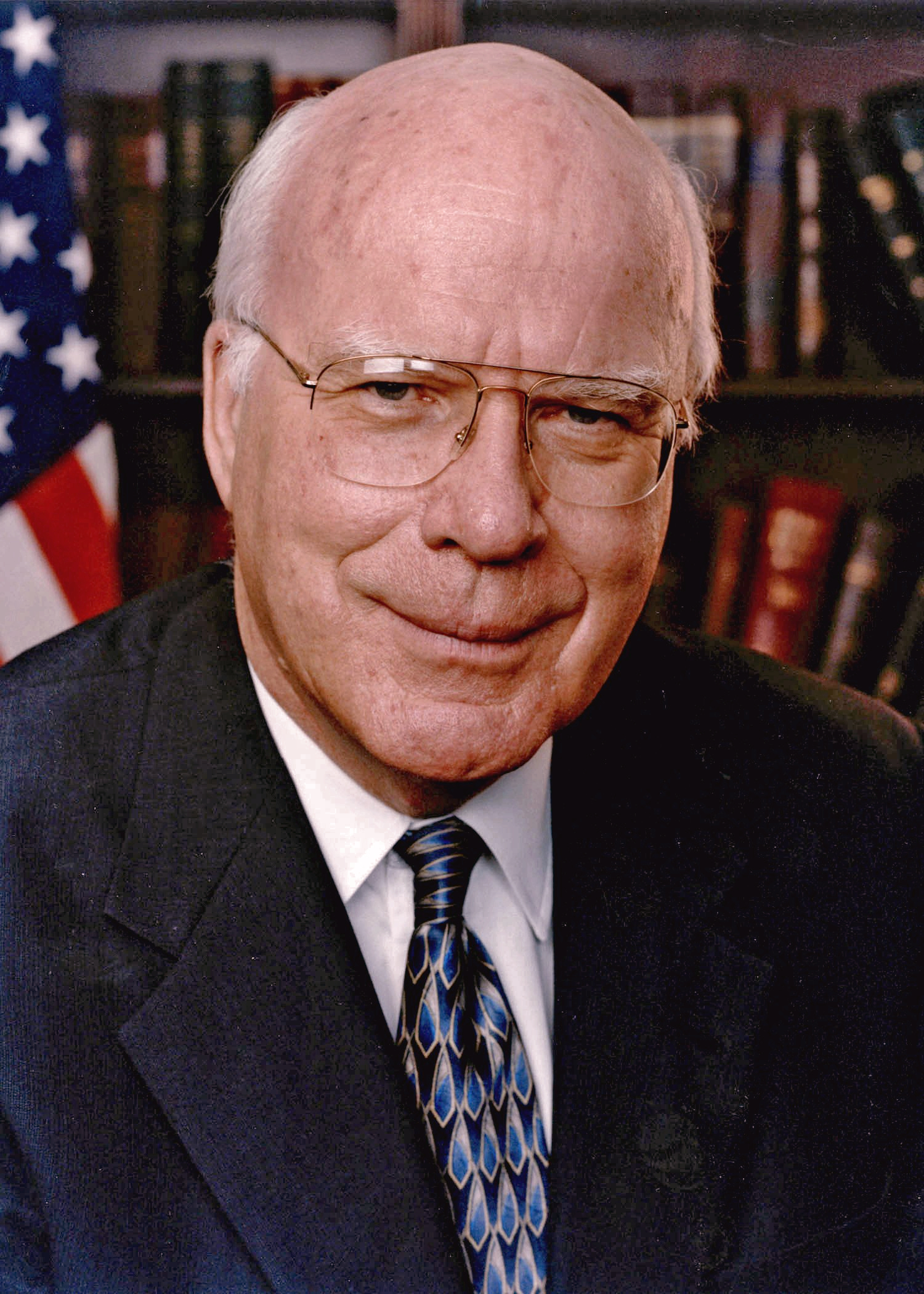

Nominee	Patrick Leahy	Jack McMullen
Party	Democratic	Republican
Popular vote	216,972	75,398
Percentage	70.6%	24.5%
- Leahy: 40-50% 50-60% 60-70% 70-80% 80-90% McMullen: 50-60%
U.S. senator before election
Patrick Leahy
Democratic
Elected U.S. Senator
Patrick Leahy
Democratic

Incumbent Democrat Patrick Leahy won re-election to a sixth term.

Democratic primary
Party	Candidate	Votes	%
Democratic	Patrick Leahy (incumbent)	27,459	94.32
Democratic	Craig Hill	1,573	5.40
Democratic	Write-ins	81	0.28
Total votes		29,113	100.00%

Republican primary
Party	Candidate	Votes	%
Republican	Jack McMullen	9,591	67.69
Republican	Peter D. Moss	2,058	14.52
Republican	Ben Mitchell	1,715	12.10
Republican	Write-ins	806	5.69
Total votes		14,170	100.00

Vermont general election
Party	Candidate	Votes	%	±%
Democratic	Patrick Leahy (incumbent)	216,972	70.63	−1.59%
Republican	Jack McMullen	75,398	24.54	+2.09%
Independent	Cris Ericson	6,486	2.11	
Green	Craig Hill	3,999	1.30	
Independent	Keith Stern	3,300	1.07	
Liberty Union	Ben Mitchell	879	0.29	−0.29%
Write-ins		174	0.06	
Majority		141,574	46.08	−3.68%
Turnout		307,208		

== Washington ==
Washington Election
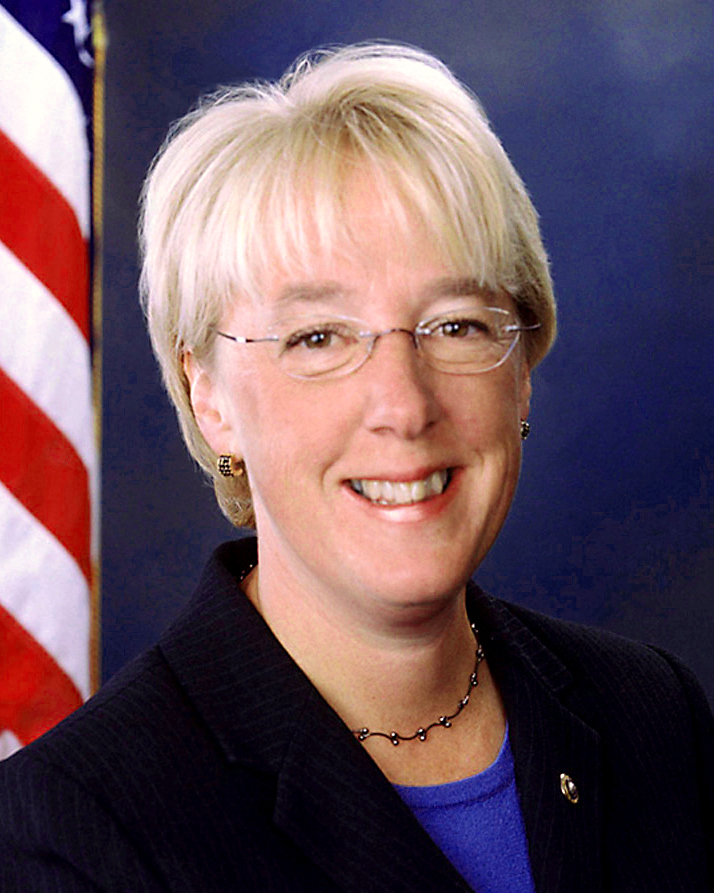

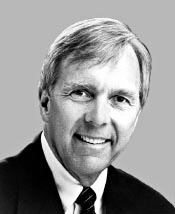
Nominee	Patty Murray	George Nethercutt
Party	Democratic	Republican
Popular vote	1,549,708	1,204,584
Percentage	55.0%	42.7%
- County results Murray: 40–50% 50–60% 60–70% Nethercutt: 40-50% 50-60% 60-70%
U.S. senator before election
Patty Murray
Democratic
Elected U.S. Senator
Patty Murray
Democratic

Incumbent Democrat Patty Murray won re-election. She became only the fourth Washington senator to win three consecutive terms, after fellow Democrats Warren G. Magnuson and Scoop Jackson.

Term limits became an issue in the campaign, as Democrats seized on Nethercutt's broken term-limits pledge that he had made when he unseated Speaker Tom Foley in 1994. Nethercutt was also hampered by his lack of name recognition in the more densely populated western part of the state, home to two-thirds of the state's population. Washington has not elected a senator from east of the Cascades since Miles Poindexter in 1916. Other important issues included national security and the war in Iraq. Nethercutt supported the invasion of Iraq, while Murray opposed it. Nethercutt was a heavy underdog from the start, and his campaign never gained much traction. In November, he lost by 12 points, receiving 43 percent of the vote to Murray's 55 percent.

Washington general election
Party	Candidate	Votes	%
Democratic	Patty Murray (incumbent)	1,549,708	54.98
Republican	George Nethercutt	1,204,584	42.74
Libertarian	J. Mills	34,055	1.21
Green	Mark Wilson	30,304	1.08
Total votes		2,818,651	100.00

== Wisconsin ==
Wisconsin Election
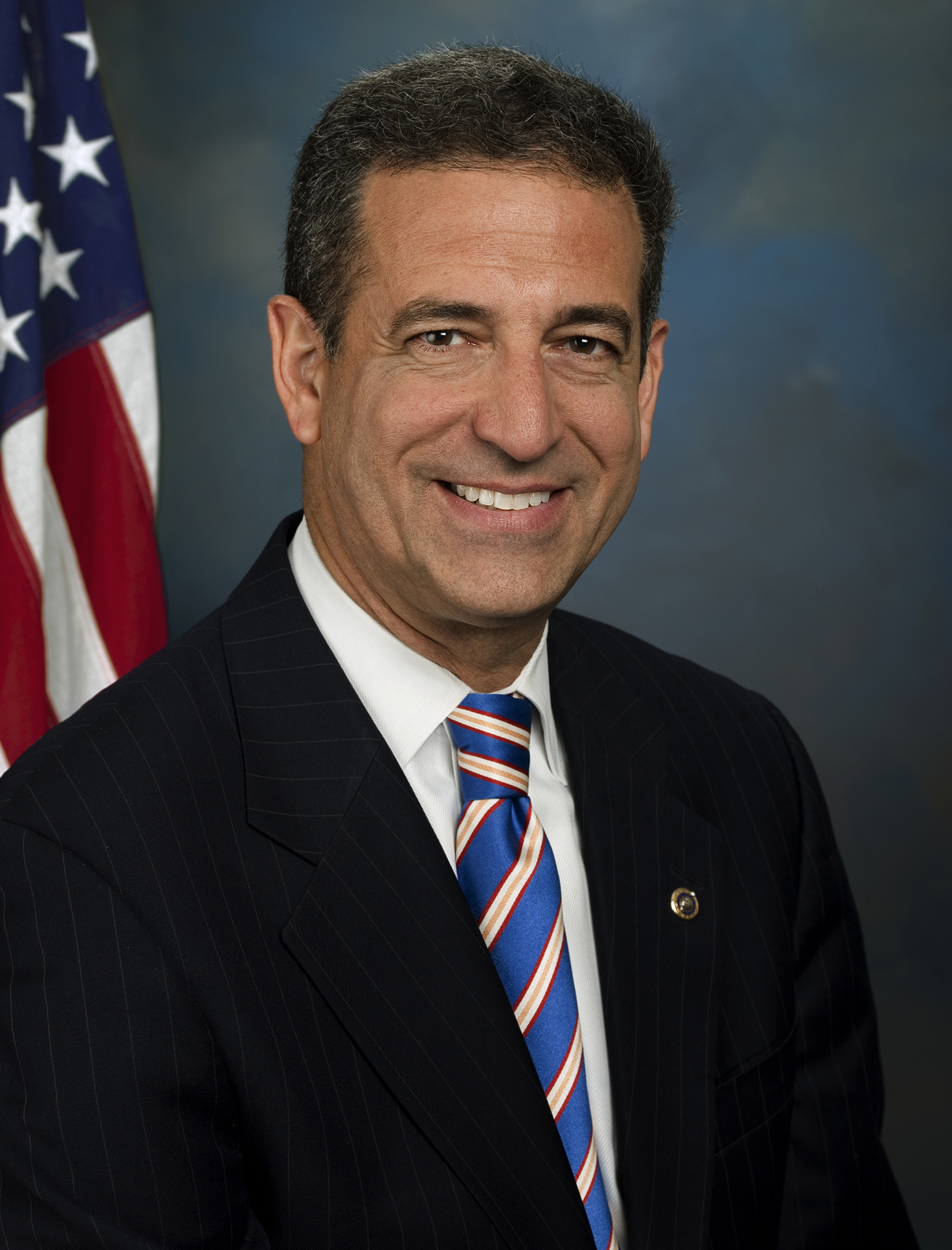

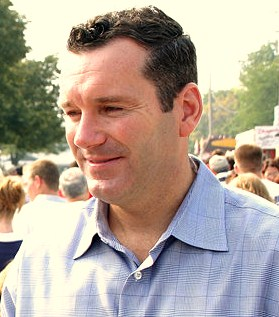
Nominee	Russ Feingold	Tim Michels
Party	Democratic	Republican
Popular vote	1,632,697	1,301,183
Percentage	55.3%	44.1%
- Feingold: 50–60% 60–70% 70–80% 80–90% Michels: 40–50% 50–60% 60–70%
U.S. senator before election
Russ Feingold
Democratic
Elected U.S. Senator
Russ Feingold
Democratic

Incumbent Democrat Russ Feingold won re-election to a third term.

Republican businessman and Army veteran Tim Michels insisted he had more real world experience than Feingold, someone he called an "extreme liberal" who was out of touch with Wisconsin voters. Feingold countered by saying that any Republican would be a rubber stamp for President Bush. The incumbent had $2.2 million in the bank, while Michels had already spent $1 million in the primary and had only about $150,000 left.

When the NRSC was finally convinced in October that Michels had a shot, they pledged $600,000 for him.

On October 1, a poll showed Feingold leading 52% to 39%. In mid-October, another poll showed Feingold winning 48% to 43%. A poll at the end of the month showed him leading 51% to 36%.

Wisconsin general election
Party	Candidate	Votes	%
Democratic	Russ Feingold (incumbent)	1,632,697	55.35
Republican	Tim Michels	1,301,183	44.11
Libertarian	Arif Khan	8,367	0.28
Independent	Eugene A. Hem	6,662	0.23
	Write-In Votes	834	0.03
Total votes		2,949,743	100.00

== See also ==
- 2004 United States elections
  - 2004 United States gubernatorial elections
  - 2004 United States presidential election
  - 2004 United States House of Representatives elections
- 108th United States Congress
- 109th United States Congress
