= List of African-American United States senators =

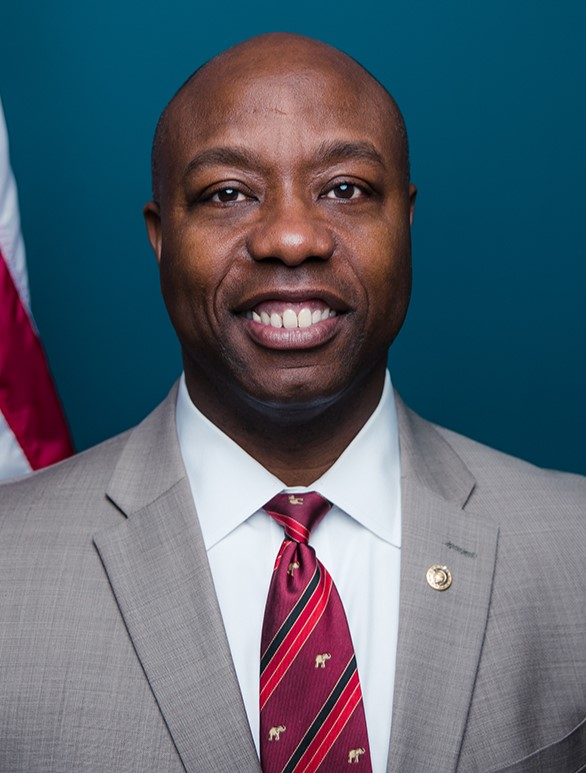
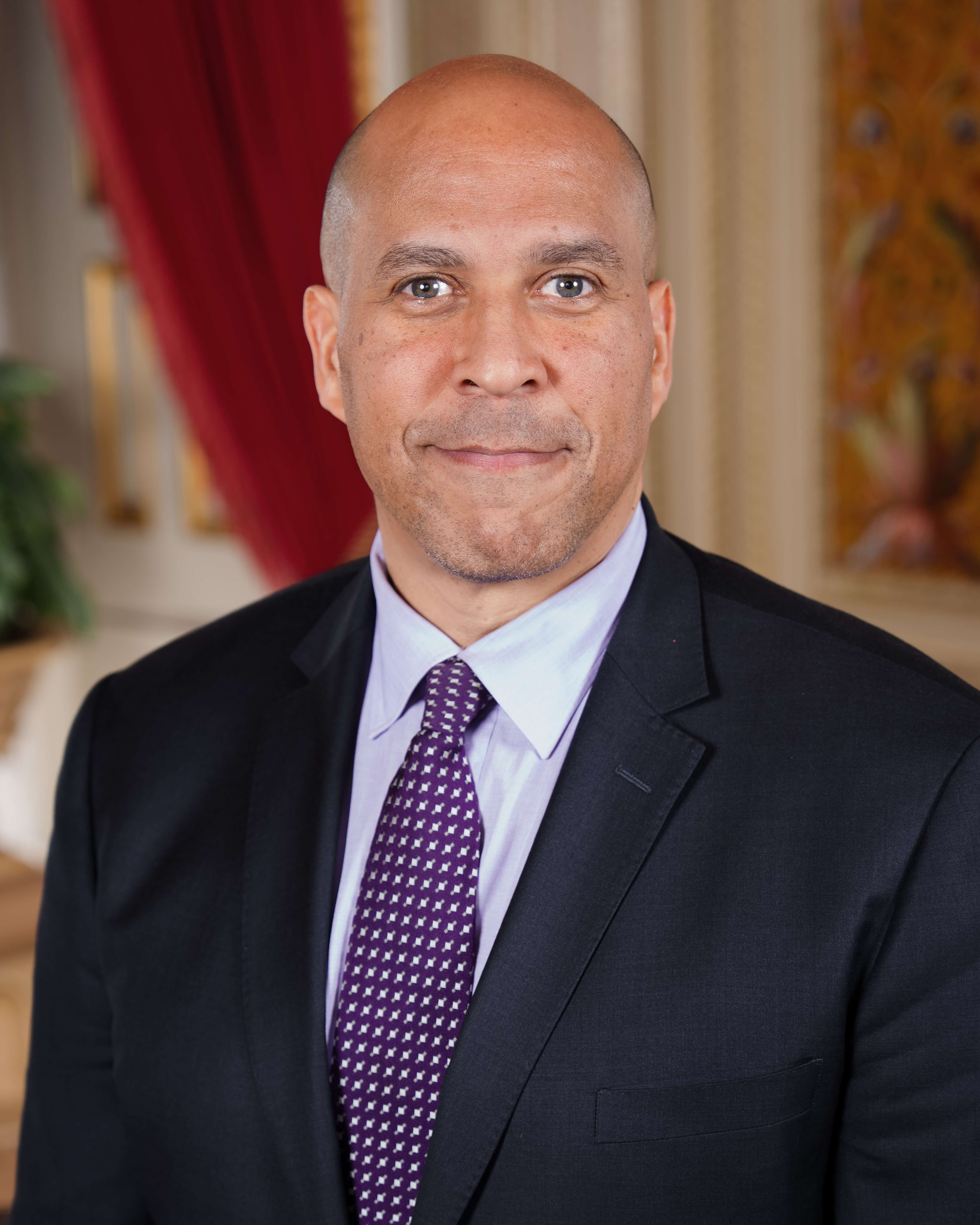
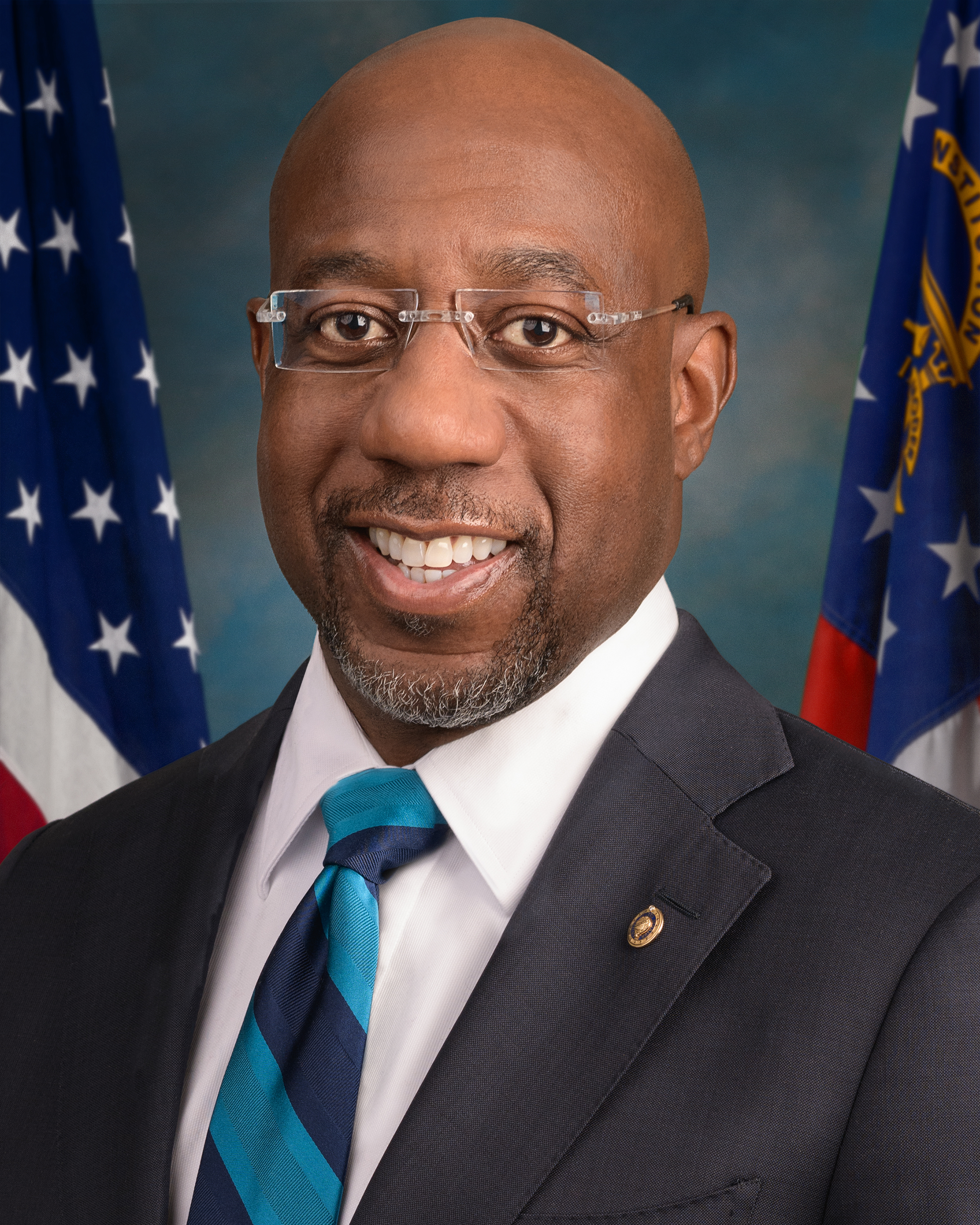
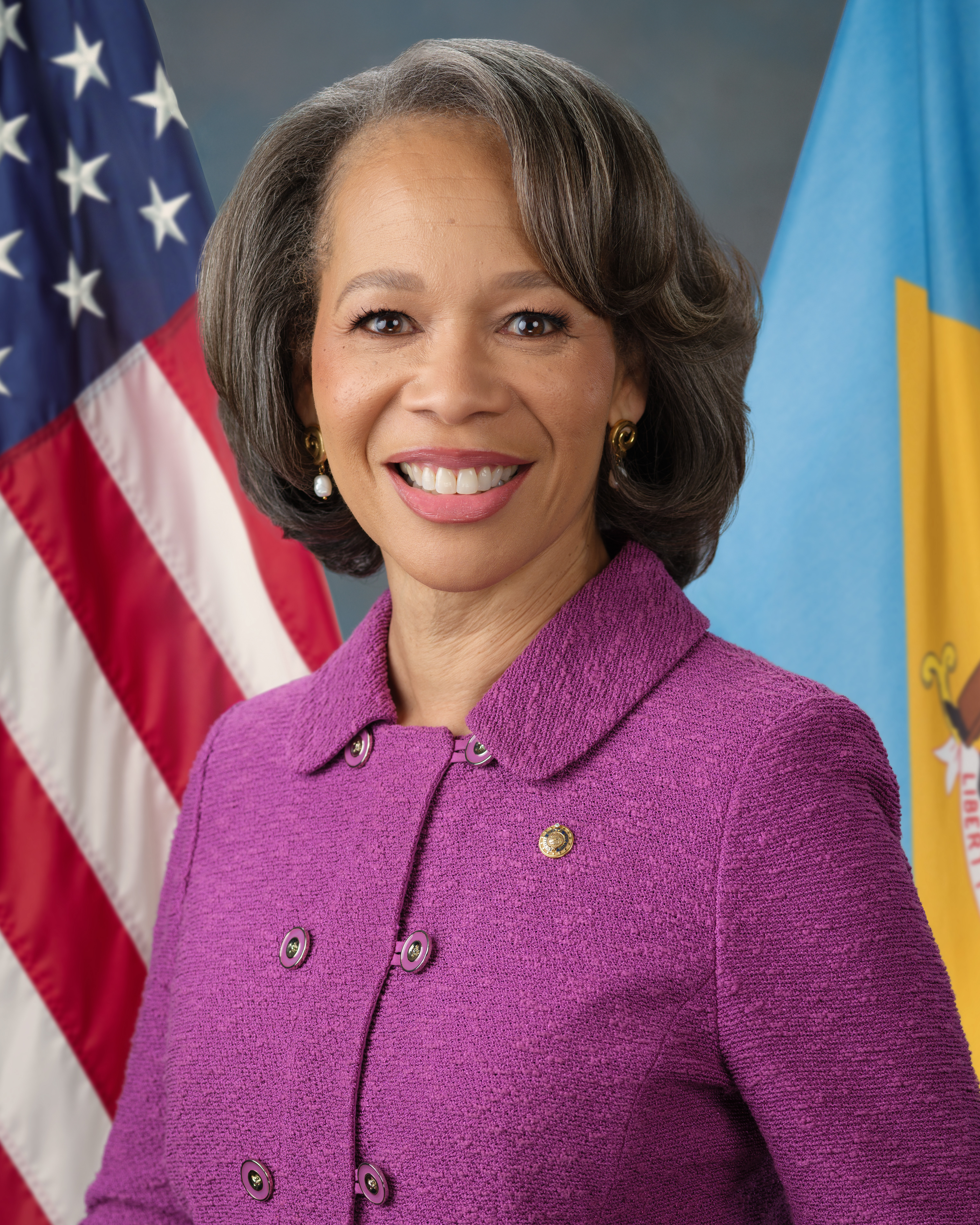
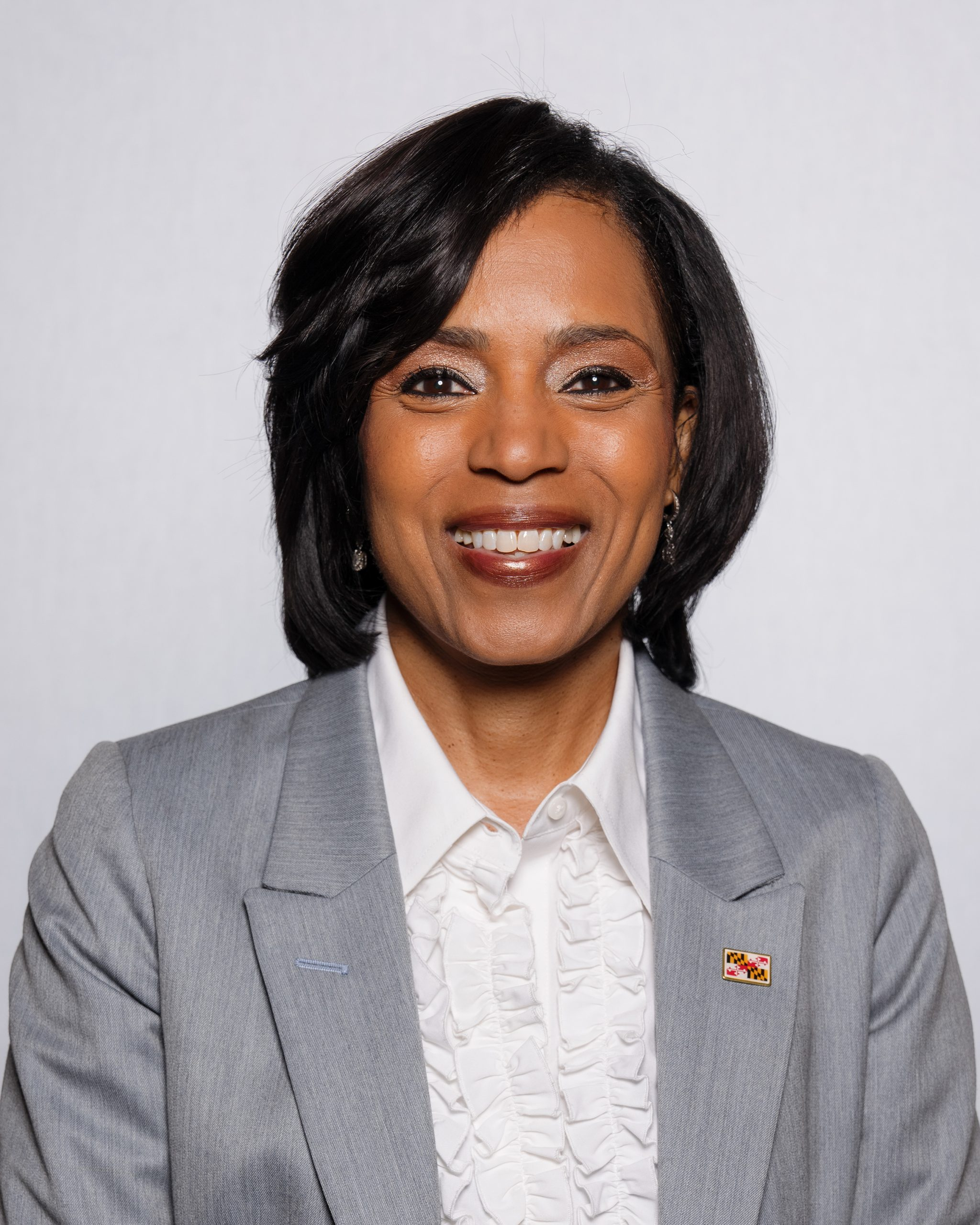
Five incumbent senators are African American: Tim Scott, Cory Booker, Raphael Warnock, Lisa Blunt Rochester, and Angela Alsobrooks.

This is a list of African Americans who have served in the United States Senate. The Senate has had 14 African-American elected or appointed officeholders. Two each served during both the 19th and 20th centuries.

Three of the 14 African-American senators held Illinois's Class 3 seat, including Barack Obama, who went on to become President of the United States. This makes Illinois the state having had the most African-American U.S. senators.

In 2016, Kamala Harris became the first African American to be elected a U.S. senator from California. Harris would go on to become the first African-American vice president of the United States and first African-American president of the United States Senate.

In 2025, Tim Scott of South Carolina became the longest-serving black senator in U.S. history at the start of his third term, and the first to chair a full committee.

Of the 14 African-American senators, nine were popularly elected (including one that previously had been appointed by his state's governor), two were elected by the state legislature prior to the ratification of the Seventeenth Amendment to the United States Constitution in 1913 (which mandated the direct election of U.S. senators by the people of each state), and three were appointed by a state governor and were not subsequently elected.

== Background ==
The United States Senate is the upper house of the bicameral United States Congress, which is the legislative branch of the federal government of the United States. The U.S. Census Bureau defines "African Americans" as citizens or residents of the United States who have origins in any of the black populations of Africa. The term is generally used for Americans with at least partial ancestry in any of the original peoples of sub-Saharan Africa.

During the founding of the federal government, African Americans were consigned to a status of second-class citizenship or enslaved. No African American served in federal elective office before the ratification in 1870 of the Fifteenth Amendment to the United States Constitution, although some (including Alexander Twilight, as state senator in Vermont) served in state elective offices concurrently with slavery. The Fifteenth Amendment prohibits the federal and state governments from denying any citizen the right to vote because of that citizen's race, color, or previous condition of servitude.

== History ==
=== Reconstruction to Obama: 1870–2011 ===
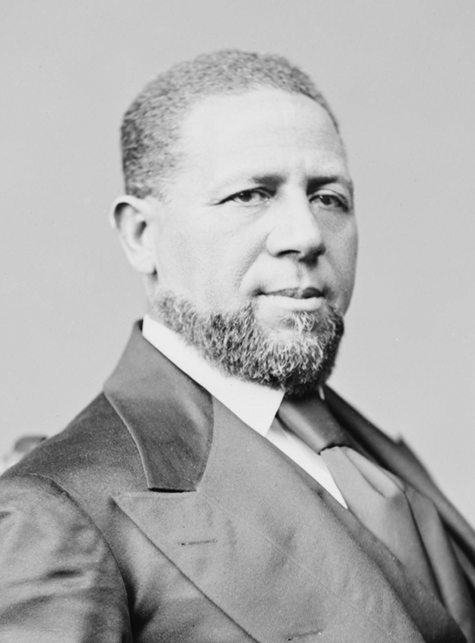
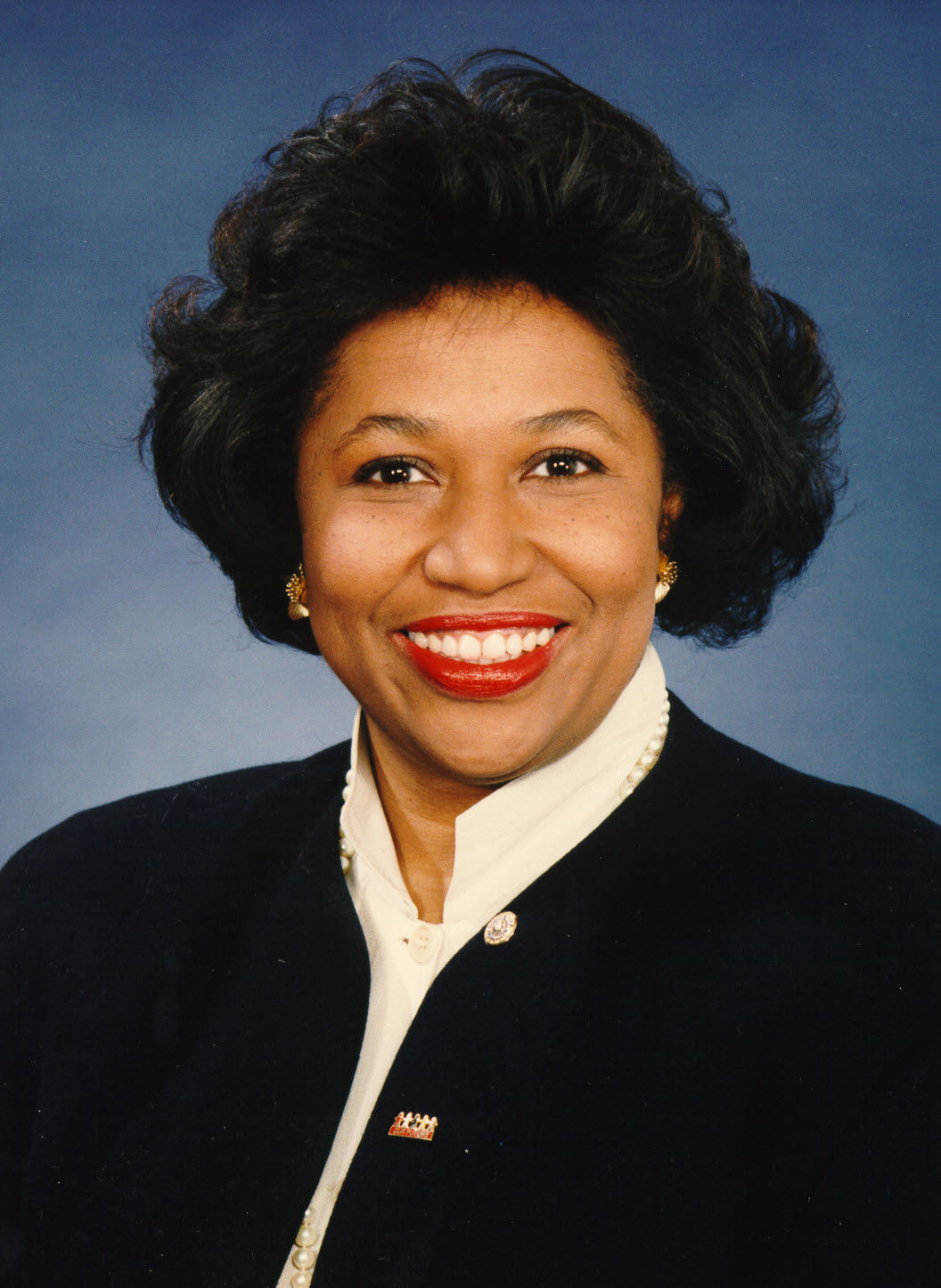
Hiram Rhodes Revels (left) was the first African American to serve in the U.S. Senate; Carol Moseley Braun was the first African American woman elected to the chamber.

The first two African-American senators represented the state of Mississippi during the Reconstruction era, following the American Civil War. Hiram Rhodes Revels, the first African American to serve in the Senate, was elected in 1870 by the Mississippi State Legislature to succeed Albert G. Brown, who resigned during the Civil War. Some Democratic members of the United States Senate opposed his being seated based on the court case Dred Scott v. Sandford (1857) by the Supreme Court of the United States, claiming that Revels did not meet the nine-year citizenship requirement, but the majority of senators voted to seat him.

In 1872, the Louisiana state legislature elected P. B. S. Pinchback to the Senate. However, the 1872 elections in Louisiana were challenged by white Democrats, and Pinchback was never seated in Congress.

The Mississippi state legislature elected Blanche Bruce in 1875, but Republicans lost power of the Mississippi state legislature in 1876. Bruce was not elected to a second term in 1881. In 1890, the Democratic-dominated state legislature passed a new constitution disfranchising most black voters. Every other Southern state also passed disfranchising constitutions by 1908, thus excluding African Americans from the political system in the entire former Confederacy. This situation persisted well into the 1960s, when federal enforcement of constitutional rights under the Voting Rights Act of 1965 commenced.

The next black United States senator, Edward Brooke of Massachusetts, took office in 1967. He was the first African American to be elected by popular vote after the ratification in 1913 of the Seventeenth Amendment to the United States Constitution, which established direct election of United States senators instead of indirect election by a state legislature. A Republican, Brooke was the first black senator to serve two terms in the Senate, holding office until 1979. From 1979 to 1993, there were no black members of the United States Senate.

Between 1993 and 2010, three black members of the Illinois Democratic Party would hold Illinois's Class 3 Senate seat at different times. Carol Moseley Braun entered the Senate in 1993 and was the first African-American woman in the Senate. She served one term. Barack Obama entered the Senate in 2005 and, in 2008, became the first African American to be elected president of the United States. Obama was still a senator when he was elected president and Roland Burris, also an African American, was appointed to fill the remainder of Obama's Senate term. Burris only briefly ran for election and did not enter the Democratic primary. From 2011 to 2013, there were no black senators for the first time since Obama was elected in 2004.

=== Contemporary period: 2013–present ===
State had an African American Senator at the beginning of the 119th Congress State has in the past had an African-American Senator

Following Obama's election as president, the next two black senators, Tim Scott of South Carolina and Mo Cowan of Massachusetts, were both appointed by governors to fill the terms of Jim DeMint and John Kerry, respectively, who had resigned their positions. Thus, 2013 marked the first time in history that more than one African American served in the Senate at the same time. On October 16 of that year, Cory Booker of New Jersey was elected in a special election to fill the seat of Frank R. Lautenberg, who died in office earlier in the year. Booker was the first African-American senator to be elected since Obama and, when he was sworn into office, became the first to represent New Jersey. He later was elected to a full six-year term in the 2014 mid-term elections. Scott retained his seat in a special election in 2014 and also secured a full six-year term in 2016.

In 2017, Scott and Booker were joined by Kamala Harris of California. Harris was the second African-American woman to serve in the Senate, and, in 2020, was elected as the first female vice president of the United States. In 2021, Raphael Warnock of Georgia was elected as the first African-American Democrat to represent a former Confederate state in the Senate.

As of 2025, there have been over 2,000 members of the United States Senate, of which 14 have been African American.

== List of African-American U.S. senators ==
Name	State	Tenure			Party	Notes
Name	State	Start	End	Duration	Party	Notes
Hiram Rhodes Revels (1827–1901)	Mississippi	February 25, 1870	March 3, 1871	1 year, 7 days	Republican	Retired. (Note: Elected to complete an unfinished term after Mississippi was readmitted to the Union on February 23, 1870. First African American to serve in the United States Senate and Congress.)
Blanche Bruce (1841–1898)	Mississippi	March 4, 1875	March 4, 1881	6 years, 0 days	Republican	Retired. (Note: First African American to serve a full six-year term as a United States senator. The only senator to be a former slave.)
Edward Brooke (1919–2015)	Massachusetts	January 3, 1967	January 3, 1979	12 years, 0 days	Republican	Lost reelection. (Note: First African American elected to the Senate by direct election. First African American to serve in Congress from Massachusetts.)
Carol Moseley Braun (born 1947)	Illinois	January 3, 1993	January 3, 1999	6 years, 0 days	Democratic	Lost reelection. (Note: First African-American female and African-American Democrat to serve in the United States Senate. First African American to serve in the Senate from Illinois.)
Barack Obama (born 1961)	Illinois	January 3, 2005	November 16, 2008	3 years, 318 days	Democratic	Resigned following election as President of the United States. (Note: First African-American senator to be elected President of the United States.)
Roland Burris (born 1937)	Illinois	January 15, 2009	November 29, 2010	1 year, 318 days	Democratic	Not a candidate during special election following his appointment. Retired. (Note: Appointed by Illinois Governor Rod Blagojevich to fill vacancy caused by the resignation of President-elect Barack Obama. First African American to succeed another African American in the Senate.)
Tim Scott (born 1965)	South Carolina	January 2, 2013	Incumbent	13 years, 317 days	Republican	Serving. (Note: Appointed by South Carolina Governor Nikki Haley to fill vacancy caused by the resignation of Jim DeMint. First African American to serve in the Senate from South Carolina. First African American to serve in both chambers of the United States Congress.)
Mo Cowan (born 1969)	Massachusetts	February 1, 2013	July 16, 2013	165 days	Democratic	Not a candidate during special election following his appointment. Retired. (Note: Appointed by Massachusetts Governor Deval Patrick to fill vacancy caused by the resignation of John Kerry. First African-American senator appointed by an African-American governor. The first African American to serve alongside another African-American senator: Tim Scott.)
Cory Booker (born 1969)	New Jersey	October 31, 2013	Incumbent	13 years, 15 days	Democratic	Serving. (Note: First African American to serve in the Senate from New Jersey. First African American to be elected to the Senate by special election)
Kamala Harris (born 1964)	California	January 3, 2017	January 18, 2021	4 years, 15 days	Democratic	Resigned following election as Vice President of the United States. (Note: Harris is the child of a black, Caribbean-born father and an India-born mother. Other African Americans who were elected to Congress and were born in the Caribbean or to Caribbean-born parents include Rep. Shirley Chisholm, Rep. Yvette D. Clarke, Del. Stacey Plaskett, Rep. Mia Love, Del. Melvin H. Evans, Del. Donna Christian-Christensen, and Del. Victor O. Frazer. Chisholm was the child of Caribbean-born parents and was the first African-American woman to be elected to Congress.) (Note: First African American to serve in the Senate from California. First African-American senator to be elected as Vice President.)
Raphael Warnock (born 1969)	Georgia	January 20, 2021	Incumbent	5 years, 299 days	Democratic	Serving. (Note: First African American to serve in the Senate from Georgia.)
Laphonza Butler (born 1979)	California	October 3, 2023	December 8, 2024	1 year, 66 days	Democratic	Not a candidate for election. Resigned. (Note: Appointed by Governor Gavin Newsom to fill the vacancy created by the death of Senator Dianne Feinstein. First openly LGBT African-American senator.)
Angela Alsobrooks (born 1971)	Maryland	January 3, 2025	Incumbent	1 year, 316 days	Democratic	Serving. (Note: First African American to serve in the Senate from Maryland. First African-American woman to serve alongside another African-American woman in the Senate: Lisa Blunt Rochester.)
Lisa Blunt Rochester (born 1962)	Delaware	January 3, 2025	Incumbent	1 year, 316 days	Democratic	Serving. (Note: First African American to serve in the Senate from Delaware. First African-American woman to serve alongside another African-American woman in the Senate: Angela Alsobrooks.)

=== Senators-elect ===
Name (birth–death)	Party	State	Start	Notes
Scott Colom (born 1982)	Democratic	Mississippi	January 3, 2027	Elect
Juliana Stratton (born 1965)	Democratic	Illinois	January 3, 2027	Elect

== African Americans elected to the United States Senate, but not seated ==
Image	Senator-elect	State	Year elected	Party	Notes
	P. B. S. Pinchback (1837–1921)	Louisiana	1873	Republican	Denied seat due to a contested election that involved fellow Republican William L. McMillen.

== List of states represented by African Americans ==
Nine states have been represented by black senators. As of January 3, 2025, five states are represented by black senators.

State	Current	Previous	Total	First black senator	Years represented by black senators	Year first elected a black senator
California	0	2	2	Kamala Harris	2017–2021, 2023–2024	2016
Delaware	1	0	1	Lisa Blunt Rochester	2025–present	2024
Georgia	1	0	1	Raphael Warnock	2021–present	2021
Illinois	0	3	3	Carol Moseley-Braun	1993–1999, 2005–2008, 2009–2010	1992
Maryland	1	0	1	Angela Alsobrooks	2025–present	2024
Massachusetts	0	2	2	Edward Brooke	1967–1979, 2013	1966
Mississippi	0	2	2	Hiram Rhodes Revels	1870–1871, 1875–1881	1870 (by state legislature)
New Jersey	1	0	1	Cory Booker	2013–present	2013
South Carolina	1	0	1	Tim Scott	2013–present	2014

== Graphs ==
The histogram below sets forth the number of African Americans who served in the United States Senate during the periods provided.

Starting	Total	Graph
March 4, 1789	0	
February 25, 1870	1	❚
March 4, 1871	0	
March 4, 1875	1	❚
March 4, 1881	0	
January 3, 1967	1	❚
January 4, 1979	0	
January 3, 1993	1	❚
January 4, 1999	0	
January 3, 2005	1	❚
November 17, 2008	0	
January 15, 2009	1	❚
November 30, 2010	0	
January 2, 2013	1	❚
February 1, 2013	2	❚❚
July 17, 2013	1	❚
October 31, 2013	2	❚❚
January 3, 2017	3	❚❚❚
January 18, 2021	2	❚❚
January 20, 2021	3	❚❚❚
October 3, 2023	4	❚❚❚❚
December 8, 2024	3	❚❚❚
January 3, 2025	5	❚❚❚❚❚

== Elections with two African-American major-party nominees ==
Elections with two African-American major-party nominees
Election year	State	Winner	Second-place finisher
2004	Illinois	Barack Obama	Alan Keyes
2014	South Carolina	**Tim Scott**	Joyce Dickerson
2016	South Carolina	**Tim Scott**	Thomas Dixon
2022	Georgia	**Raphael Warnock**	Herschel Walker
2022	South Carolina	**Tim Scott**	Krystle Matthews
Note: Incumbent Senators are in **bold**

== See also ==
- List of African-American United States Senate candidates

Federal government

- African Americans in the United States Congress
  - List of African-American United States representatives
  - Congressional Black Caucus
  - Congressional Black Caucus Foundation
- List of African-American United States Cabinet members
- List of African American firsts

State and local government

- African-American officeholders in the United States, 1789–1866
- List of African-American officeholders during Reconstruction
- List of African-American U.S. state firsts
- List of first African-American mayors
