= Dantzler =

Dantzler is a surname. Notable people with the surname include:

- Cameron Dantzler (born 1998), American football player
- Connor Dantzler (born 1994), American athlete
- Rick Dantzler (born 1956), American lawyer and politician
- T. C. Dantzler (born 1970), American Greco-Roman wrestler
- Tom Dantzler (born 1941), American politician
- Woodrow Dantzler (born 1979), American football player
