= Thomas Dantzler =

Thomas Dantzler may refer to:

- T. C. Dantzler (born 1970), American wrestler
- Tom Dantzler (born 1941), American politician
