= List of African-American United States Senate candidates =

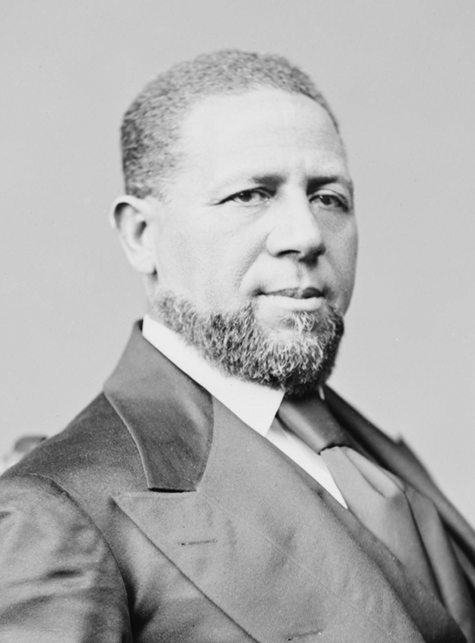
Hiram Revels

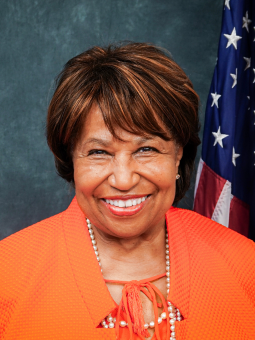
Carol Moseley Braun

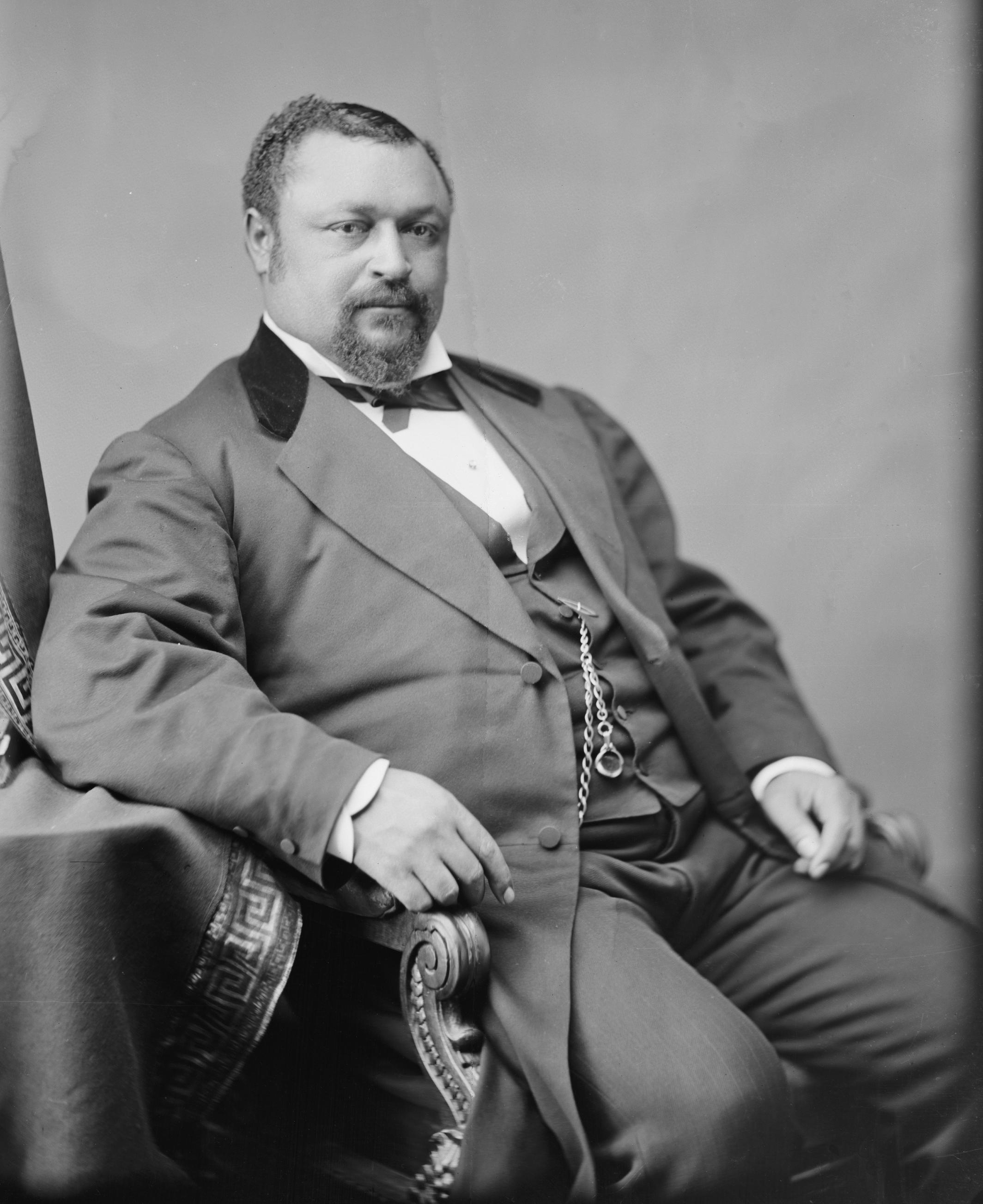
Blanche Bruce

This page is a list of African-American United States Senate candidates.

Listed are those African-American candidates who achieved ballot access for a federal election. They made the primary ballot, and have votes in the election in order to qualify for this list.

Not included are African-Americans potential candidates (suggested by media, objects of draft movements, etc.), potential candidates who did not file for office or fictional candidates. Two biracial candidates are included: Barack Obama and Kamala Harris.

In 2024, two African-American women won their United States Senate races: Lisa Blunt Rochester and Angela Alsobrooks.

In 2026, Juliana Stratton, the second African-American woman from Illinois, and Scott Colom, the first African-American man from Mississippi since Blanche Bruce, won their United States Senate races.

== U.S. Senate candidates ==
The default sort is by descending year, followed by state, followed by candidate surname.

Denotes winning candidate.
+ Denotes party nominee.

African-American candidates
Year	Name	Party	Details	State
2026	Angie Nixon+	Democratic	48.0%	Florida
2026	Juliana Stratton+	Democratic	61.4%	Illinois
2026	Charles Booker+	Democratic	42.9%	Kentucky
2026	Scott Colom+	Democratic	49.2%	Mississippi
2026	Marcus Williams	Democratic	2.4% primary result	North Carolina
2026	Marquita Bradshaw+	Democratic	42.9%	Tennessee
2026	John Adefope	Republican	0.4% primary result	Texas
2026	Jasmine Crockett	Democratic	46.2% primary result	Texas
2026	Wesley Hunt	Republican	13.5% primary result	Texas
2024	Barbara Lee	Democratic	9.8% all-party primary result	California
2024	Lisa Blunt Rochester+	Democratic	56.6%	Delaware
2024	Angela Alsobrooks+	Democratic	54.6%	Maryland
2024	Royce White+	Republican	40.5%	Minnesota
2022	Val Demings+	Democratic	41.3%	Florida
2022	Herschel Walker+	Republican	48.6% runoff result	Georgia
2022	Raphael Warnock+	Democratic	51.4% runoff result	Georgia
2022	Charles Booker+	Democratic	38.2%	Kentucky
2022	Gary Chambers+	Democratic	17.9%	Louisiana
2022	Joe Pinion+	Republican	42.8%	New York
2022	Cheri Beasley+	Democratic	47.3%	North Carolina
2022	Malcolm Kenyatta	Democratic	10.85% primary result	Pennsylvania
2022	Catherine Fleming Bruce	Democratic	44.23% primary runoff result	South Carolina
2022	Krystle Matthews+	Democratic	37%	South Carolina
2022	Tim Scott+	Republican	62.9%	South Carolina
2022	Mandela Barnes+	Democratic	49.4%	Wisconsin
2020	Raphael Warnock+	Democratic	51%; special/runoff election (2021)	Georgia
2020	Willie Wilson	Willie Wilson Party	4%	Illinois
2020	John James+	Republican	48.2%	Michigan
2020	Mike Espy+	Democratic	44.1%	Mississippi
2020	Preston Love Jr.	Democratic	6.3% primary result	Nebraska
2020	Cory Booker+	Democratic	57.2%	New Jersey
2020	Jaime Harrison+	Democratic	44.2%	South Carolina
2020	Marquita Bradshaw+	Democratic	35.2%	Tennessee
2018	John James+	Republican	45.8%	Michigan
2018	Mike Espy+	Democratic	46.4%; special election	Mississippi
2016	Kamala Harris+	Democratic	61.8%	California
2016	Donna Edwards	Democratic	38.9% primary result	Maryland
2016	Thomas Dixon+	Democratic, Green	36.9%	South Carolina
2016	Tim Scott+	Republican	60.6%	South Carolina
2014	Cory Booker+	Democratic	55.8%	New Jersey
2014	Constance N. Johnson+	Democratic	29%	Oklahoma
2014	Joyce Dickerson+	Democratic	37.1%	South Carolina
2013	Cory Booker+	Democratic	54.9%; special election	New Jersey
2010	Kendrick Meek+	Democratic	20.1%	Florida
2010	Mike Thurmond+	Democratic	39.2%	Georgia
2010	Alvin Greene+	Democratic	28.2%	South Carolina
2008	Vivian Davis Figures+	Democratic	36.5%	Alabama
2008	Erik R. Fleming+	Democratic	38.6%	Mississippi
2006	Kweisi Mfume	Democratic	40.5% primary result	Maryland
2006	Michael Steele+	Republican	44.2%	Maryland
2006	Erik R. Fleming+	Democratic	34.8%	Mississippi
2006	Harold Ford Jr.+	Democratic	48%	Tennessee
2006	Aaron Dixon+	Green	1.02%	Washington
2004	Denise Majette+	Democratic	40%	Georgia
2004	Barack Obama+	Democratic	70%	Illinois
2004	Alan Keyes+	Republican	27%	Illinois
2004	Tee Ferguson+	United Citizens	0.4%	South Carolina
2004	Efia Nwangaza+	Green	0.3%	South Carolina
2002	Ron Kirk+	Democratic	43.3%	Texas
1998	Gary Franks+	Republican	32.4%	Connecticut
1998	Carol Moseley Braun+	Democratic	47.4%	Illinois
1996	Harvey Gantt+	Democratic	45.9%	North Carolina
1994	Ron Sims+	Democratic	44.25%	Washington
1992	Gerald Horne+	Peace and Freedom	2.8%	California
1992	Carol Moseley Braun+	Democratic	53.3%; first African-American woman elected to the U.S. Senate	Illinois
1992	Alan Keyes+	Republican	29%	Maryland
1990	Harvey Gantt+	Democratic	47.4%	North Carolina
1988	Alan Keyes+	Republican	38.2%	Maryland
1988	Maurice Dawkins+	Republican	28.7%	Virginia
1988	Ernie Chambers+	New Alliance	1.6%	Nebraska
1978	Edward Brooke+	Republican	44.9%	Massachusetts
1978	Charles Evers	Independent	22.6%	Mississippi
1972	Edward Brooke+	Republican	63.5%	Massachusetts
1966	Edward Brooke+	Republican	60.7%; first African-American senator elected by popular vote	Massachusetts
1926	Nick Chiles	Republican	14.39%	Kansas
1874	Blanche Bruce	Republican	First African American to serve a full term in the U.S. Senate	Mississippi
1872	P. B. S. Pinchback	Republican	Won the election; not seated due to election challenges	Louisiana
1870	Hiram Revels+	Republicans	First African-American senator (elected by state legislature to fill a vacant seat)	Mississippi
