= Tim Scott =

American politician and businessman (born 1965)

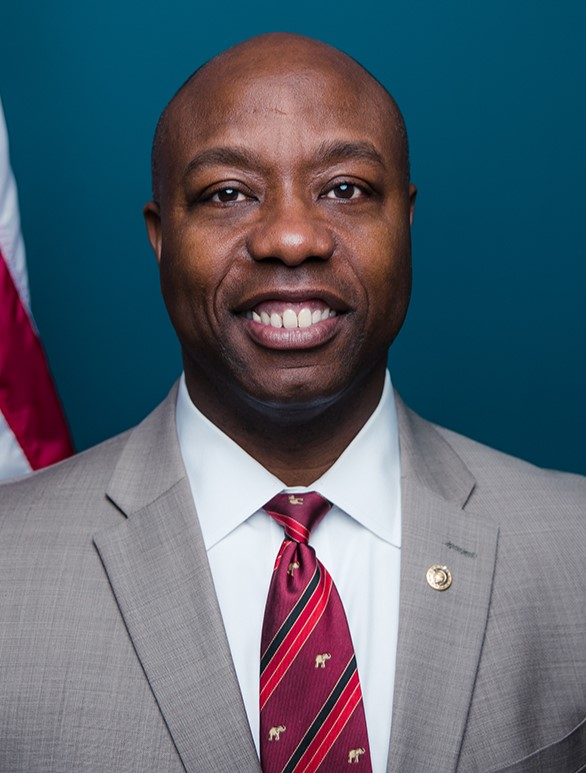
- Official portrait, 2018

United States Senator from South Carolina
- Incumbent
- Assumed office January 2, 2013 Serving with Darline Graham
- Preceded by: Jim DeMint
Committee positions
Chair of the National Republican Senatorial Committee
Incumbent
Assumed office January 3, 2025
Leader	John Thune
Preceded by	Steve Daines
Chair of the Senate Banking Committee
Incumbent
Assumed office January 3, 2025
Preceded by	Sherrod Brown
Ranking Member of the Senate Banking Committee
In office January 3, 2023 – January 3, 2025
Preceded by	Pat Toomey
Succeeded by	Elizabeth Warren
Ranking Member of the Senate Aging Committee
In office February 3, 2021 – January 3, 2023
Preceded by	Bob Casey Jr.
Succeeded by	Mike Braun

Member of the U.S. House of Representatives from South Carolina's 1st district
- In office January 3, 2011 – January 2, 2013
- Preceded by: Henry E. Brown Jr.
- Succeeded by: Mark Sanford

Member of the South Carolina House of Representatives from the 117th district
- In office January 3, 2009 – January 3, 2011
- Preceded by: Tom Dantzler
- Succeeded by: Bill Crosby

Member of the Charleston County Council from the 3rd district
- In office February 8, 1995 – January 3, 2009
- Preceded by: Keith Summey
- Succeeded by: Elliott Summey

Personal details
- Born: Timothy Eugene Scott; September 19, 1965 (age 61) North Charleston, South Carolina, U.S.
- Party: Republican
- Spouse: Mindy Noce (m. 2024)
- Education: Charleston Southern University (BS)
- Website: Senate website Campaign website
- Scott's voice Scott on the importance of extended family members in child-rearing Recorded June 22, 2022

Timothy Eugene Scott (born September 19, 1965) is an American businessman and politician serving as the senior United States senator from South Carolina, a seat he has held since 2013. A member of the Republican Party, he is the first African-American senator in the Southern United States to be directly elected, the longest-serving African-American senator in U.S. history, the first African-American to serve in both the House and Senate, and the first African-American senator to chair a full committee.

Born and raised in North Charleston, Scott worked in financial services before entering politics. He served on the Charleston County Council from 1995 to 2008, was a member of the South Carolina General Assembly from 2009 to 2011, and represented South Carolina's 1st congressional district in the U.S. House of Representatives from 2011 to 2013. In 2013, Governor Nikki Haley appointed Scott to the Senate after Jim DeMint resigned. Scott won the special election for the seat in 2014, and was elected to a full term in 2016 and reelected in 2022. He became the senior senator from South Carolina after Lindsey Graham died in July 2026.

In May 2023, Scott declared his candidacy for the 2024 Republican Party presidential nomination. He suspended his campaign in November due to low polling numbers. After the 2024 elections, Scott was elected chair of the National Republican Senatorial Committee. He also chairs the Senate Committee on Banking.

== Early life and education ==
Scott's 1983 high school portrait

Scott was born on September 19, 1965, in North Charleston, South Carolina, to Frances, a nursing assistant, and Ben Scott Sr. When Scott was seven years old, his parents divorced, leaving him and his older brother, who later became a sergeant major in the U.S. Army, to grow up in working-class poverty with their mother, who often worked double shifts to support her family.

After his parents divorced, Scott, his mother, and his older brother moved into his maternal grandparents' house. There, he formed a close bond with his grandfather.

As a freshman at North Charleston's R.B. Stall High School, he failed several subjects, prompting his mother to send him to summer school, which he had to finance by working at a local movie theater. During this time, he met John Moniz, the owner of a nearby Chick-fil-A. Their initial interaction over a sandwich at Scott's workplace evolved into a substantial mentorship. Moniz educated Scott on individual responsibility, conservative business principles, philanthropy, and finance.

From an early age, Scott enjoyed sports and excelled at football. He overcame racial prejudice in high school, securing election as student body vice president in his junior year and student body president as a senior.

A month before his senior year, he fell asleep while driving, resulting in a car accident that dimmed his prospects as a football recruit. Nevertheless, he attended Presbyterian College from 1983 to 1984 on a partial football scholarship. He was introduced to the Fellowship of Christian Athletes, an encounter that led him to his Christian faith, which became a central part of his life. Scott later transferred to Charleston Southern University, where he graduated in 1988 with a Bachelor of Science degree in political science.

Upon graduating from college, Scott worked as an insurance agent and financial adviser, a stepping stone toward starting his insurance agency, Tim Scott Allstate.

== Early political career ==
=== Charleston County Council (1995–2008) ===
==== County Council elections ====
Scott ran in a February 1995 special election for the Charleston County Council at-large seat vacated by Keith Summey, who had resigned upon being elected mayor of North Charleston. Scott won the seat as a Republican, receiving nearly 80% of the vote in the white-majority district. He became the first black Republican elected to any office in South Carolina since the late 19th century.

In 1996, Scott challenged Democratic State Senator Robert Ford in South Carolina's 42nd Senate district but lost 65–35%.

Scott was reelected to the Charleston County Council in 2000. In 2004, he was reelected again with 61% of the vote, defeating Democrat Elliot Summey (son of Mayor Keith Summey).

==== County Council tenure ====
Scott served on the Charleston County Council from 1995 until 2008, becoming chairman in 2007. In 1997, he supported posting the Ten Commandments outside the council chambers, saying it would remind members of the absolute rules they should follow. The county council unanimously approved the display, and Scott nailed a King James version of the Commandments to the wall. Shortly thereafter, the ACLU and Americans United for Separation of Church and State challenged this in a federal suit. After an initial court ruling that the display was unconstitutional, the council settled out of court to avoid incurring more legal fees. Of the costs of the suit, Scott said, "Whatever it costs in the pursuit of this goal is worth it."

In January 2001, the U.S. Department of Justice (DOJ) sued Charleston County, South Carolina for racial discrimination under the Voting Rights Act, because its council seats were based on at-large elections, meaning that the whole county voted to fill each seat. DOJ had attempted to negotiate with county officials on this issue in November 2000. Justice officials noted that at-large seats dilute the voting strength of the significant African American minority in the county, who in 2000 made up 34.5% of the population. They had been unable to elect any "candidates of their choice" for years. Whites or European Americans made up 61.9% of the county population. County officials noted that the majority of voters in 1989 had approved electing members by at-large seats in a popular referendum.

Scott, the only African American member of the county council, said of this case and the alternative of electing council members from single-member districts:

I don't like the idea of segregating everyone into smaller districts. Besides, the Justice Department assumes that the only way for African-Americans to have representation is to elect an African-American, and the same for whites. Obviously, my constituents don't think that's true.

The DOJ alleged that the issue was not a question of ethnicity, stating that voters in black precincts in the county had rejected Scott as a candidate for the council. The lawsuit noted that because of the white majority, "white bloc voting usually results in the defeat of candidates who are preferred by black voters." The Department added that blacks live in compact areas of the county and could be a majority in three districts if the county seats were apportioned as nine single-member districts.

The DOJ won the case. A new districting plan replaced the at-large method of electing the Charleston City Council. The federal court found that the former method violated the Voting Rights Act, following a lawsuit brought by the Justice Department. Scott was then elected to the Charleston County Council by District 3, rather than by the whole county.

==== County Council committee assignments ====
- Economic Development Committee (Chair)

=== South Carolina House of Representatives (2009–2011) ===
==== State House elections ====
In 2008, incumbent Republican State Representative Tom Dantzler decided to retire. With support from advisors such as Nicolas Muzin, Scott ran for his seat in District 117 of the South Carolina House of Representatives and won the Republican primary with 53% of the vote, defeating Bill Crosby and Wheeler Tillman. He won the general election unopposed, becoming the first Republican African-American State Representative in South Carolina in more than 100 years.

==== State House tenure ====
Scott supported South Carolina's right-to-work laws and argued that Boeing chose South Carolina as a site for manufacturing for that reason.

In South Carolina Club for Growth's 2009–2010 scorecard, Scott earned a B and a score of 80 out of 100. The South Carolina Association of Taxpayers praised his "diligent, principled and courageous stands against higher taxes."

==== State House committee assignments ====
- Judiciary
- Labor, Commerce and Industry
- Ways and Means

== U.S. House of Representatives (2011–2013) ==
=== House elections ===
==== 2010 ====
Scott entered the election for lieutenant governor but switched to run for South Carolina's 1st congressional district after Republican incumbent Henry Brown announced his retirement. The 1st district is based in Charleston and includes approximately the northern 3/4 of the state's coastline (except for Beaufort and Hilton Head Island, which were included in the 2nd District after redistricting).

Scott finished first in the nine-candidate June 8 Republican primary, receiving a plurality of 32% of the vote. Fellow Charleston County Councilman Paul Thurmond was second with 16%. Carroll A. Campbell III, the son of former Governor Carroll A. Campbell Jr., was third with 14%. Charleston County School Board member Larry Kobrovsky ranked fourth with 11%. Five other candidates had single-digit percentages.

A runoff was held on June 22 between Scott and Thurmond. Scott was endorsed by the Club for Growth, various Tea Party movement groups, former Alaska governor and vice presidential nominee Sarah Palin, Republican House Whip Eric Cantor, former Arkansas governor Mike Huckabee, and South Carolina senator Jim DeMint. He defeated Thurmond 68–32% and won every county in the district.

According to the Associated Press, Scott "swamped his opponents in fundraising, spending almost $725,000 during the election cycle to less than $20,000 for his November opponents". He won the general election against Democratic nominee Ben Frasier 65–29%. With this election, Scott and Allen West of Florida became the first African-American Republicans in Congress since J. C. Watts retired in 2003. Scott also became the first African-American Republican elected to Congress from South Carolina in 114 years.

==== 2012 ====
Scott was unopposed in the primary and won the general election against Democratic nominee Bobbie Rose, 62–36%.

==== House tenure ====
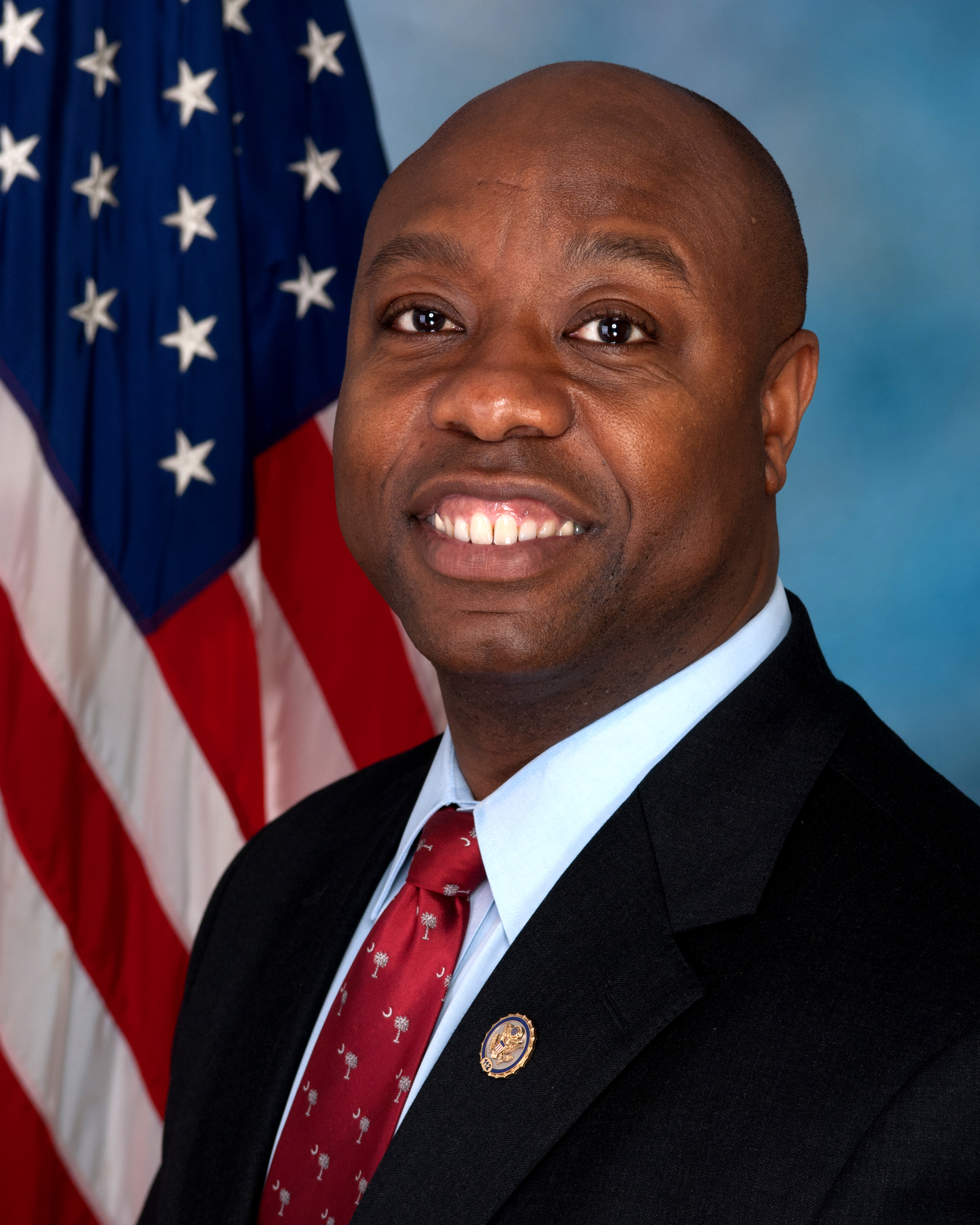
Scott's official 112th Congress portrait

Scott declined to join the Congressional Black Caucus (CBC). He recognized the efforts of the CBC but said "My campaign was never about race."

In March 2011, Scott co-sponsored a welfare reform bill that the liberal blog ThinkProgress said would terminate food stamps to families when a family member participates in a labor strike; the Republican Study Committee denied that charge. He introduced legislation in July 2011 so that the National Labor Relations Board (NLRB) could not order "any employer to relocate, shut down, or transfer employment under any circumstance". The NLRB had recently opposed the relocation of a Boeing production facility from Washington state to South Carolina.

Scott successfully advocated for federal funds for a Charleston harbor dredging project estimated at $300 million, saying the project was neither an earmark nor an example of wasteful government spending. He said the project was merit-based and in the national interest because larger cargo ships could use the port and jobs would be created. During the summer 2011 debate over raising the U.S. debt ceiling, Scott supported the inclusion of a balanced budget amendment in the debt ceiling bill, but after a day full of meetings and prayer he went from leaning No on the bill to voting No.

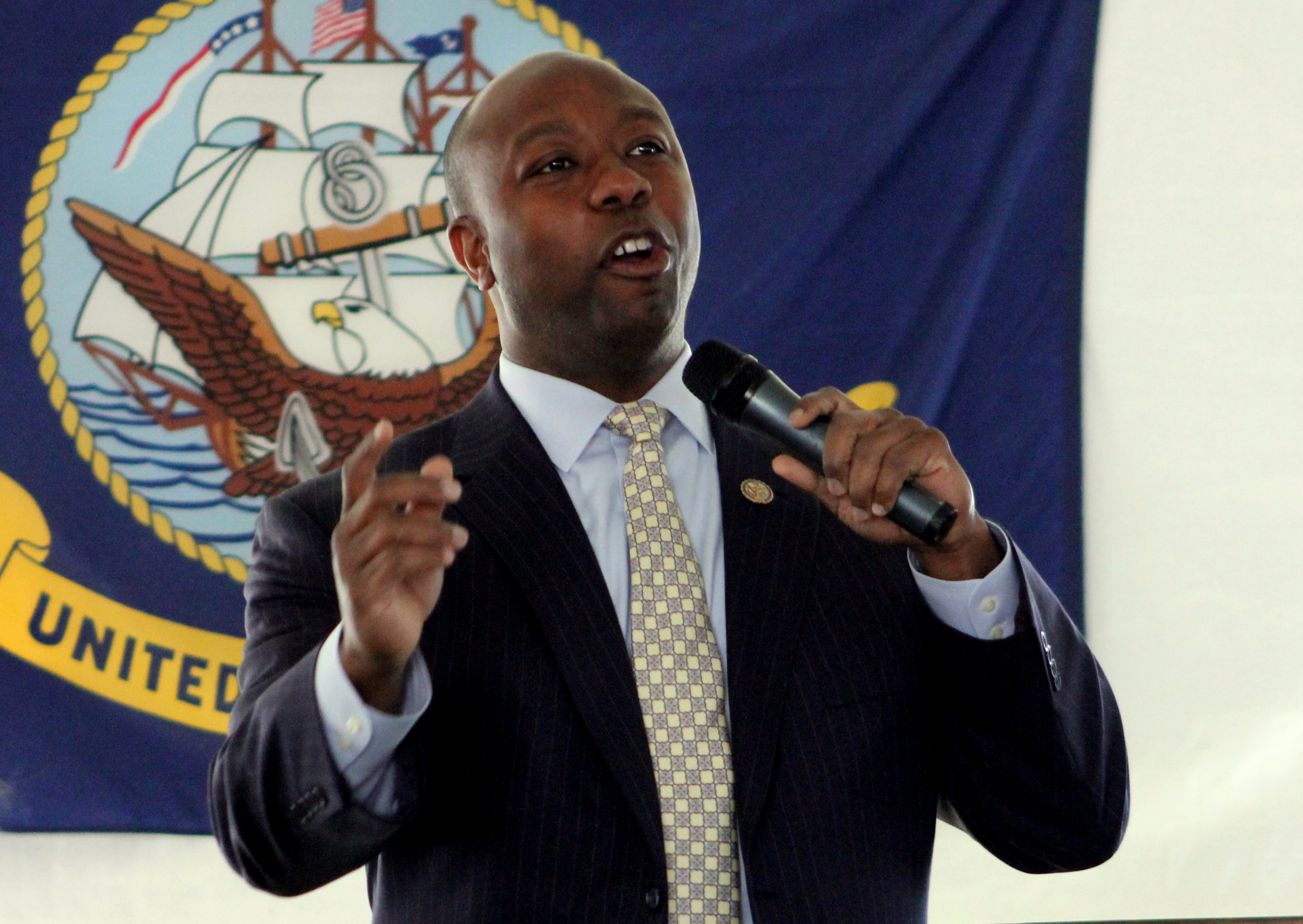
Scott speaking at a Veterans Day event in 2011

==== House committee assignments ====
The House Republican Steering Committee appointed Scott to the Committee on Transportation and the Committee on Small Business. He was later appointed to the Committee on Rules and relinquished his other two assignments.

- Committee on Rules
  - Subcommittee on Rules and the Organization of the House

== U.S. Senate (2013–present) ==
=== 2012 appointment ===
On December 17, 2012, South Carolina governor Nikki Haley announced she would appoint Scott to replace retiring Senator Jim DeMint, who had previously announced that he would retire from the Senate to become the President of The Heritage Foundation. Scott is the first African American U.S. senator from South Carolina. He was one of three black U.S. Senators in the 113th Congress, alongside Mo Cowan and later Cory Booker (and the first since Roland Burris retired in 2010 after succeeding Barack Obama). He is the first African American to be a U.S. senator from the Southern United States since Reconstruction.

During two periods, first from January 2, 2013, until February 1, 2013, and again from July 16, 2013, until October 31, 2013, Scott was the only African American senator. He and Cowan were the first black senators to serve alongside each other.

News media reported that Scott, Representative Trey Gowdy, former South Carolina Attorney General Henry McMaster, former First Lady of South Carolina Jenny Sanford, and South Carolina Department of Health and Environmental Control Director Catherine Templeton were on Haley's short list to replace DeMint. Of choosing Scott, Haley said, "It is important to me, as a minority female, that Congressman Scott earned this seat, he earned this seat for the person that he is. He earned this seat with the results he has shown."

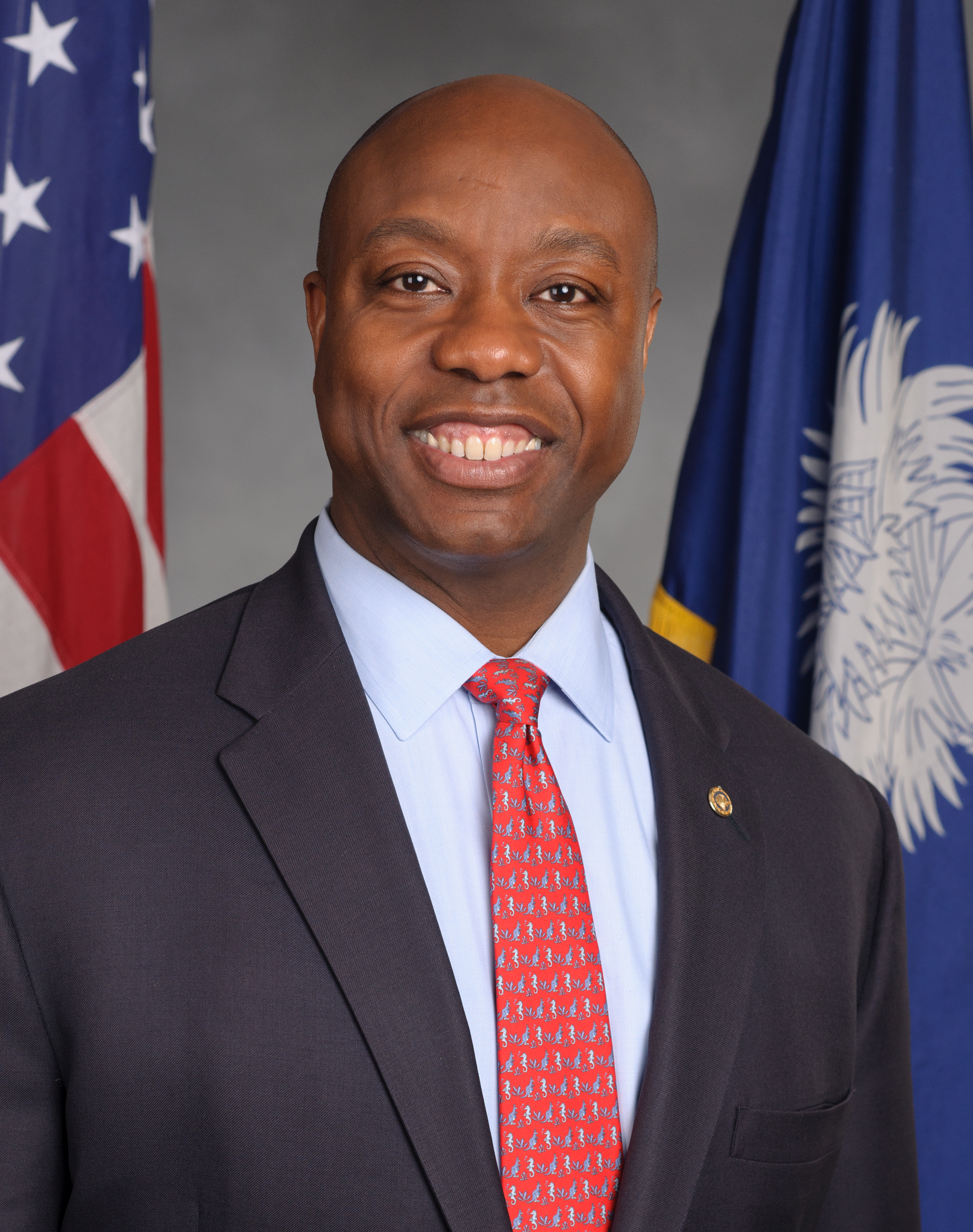
Scott’s 113th Congress portrait, 2013

=== Senate elections ===
==== 2014 ====
Scott ran to serve the final two years of DeMint's term and won, defeating Democratic nominee Joyce Dickerson. In January 2014, he signed an amicus brief in support of Senator Ron Johnson's legal challenge to the U.S. Office of Personnel Management's Affordable Care Act ruling.

==== 2016 ====
Scott was reelected to a full term, defeating Democratic nominee Thomas Dixon. He was endorsed by the Club for Growth.

In July 2018, Scott and senator Cory Booker and then-senator Kamala Harris introduced a bipartisan bill to make lynching a federal hate crime.

In February 2019, Scott was one of 16 senators to vote against legislation preventing a partial government shutdown and containing $1.375 billion for barriers along the U.S.–Mexico border that included 55 miles of fencing.

In April 2021, Scott delivered the Republican response to President Joe Biden's Joint Address to Congress.

On May 28, 2021, Scott voted against creating an independent commission to investigate the 2021 U.S. Capitol attack.

==== 2022 ====
In August 2019, Scott said, "I plan to run for reelection, but that will be my last one, if I run." He was reelected in 2022, defeating Democratic nominee Krystle Matthews.

==== 2028 ====
In July 2026, Scott reversed his March 2026 pledge to retire and announced his candidacy for a third term.

=== Senate tenure ===
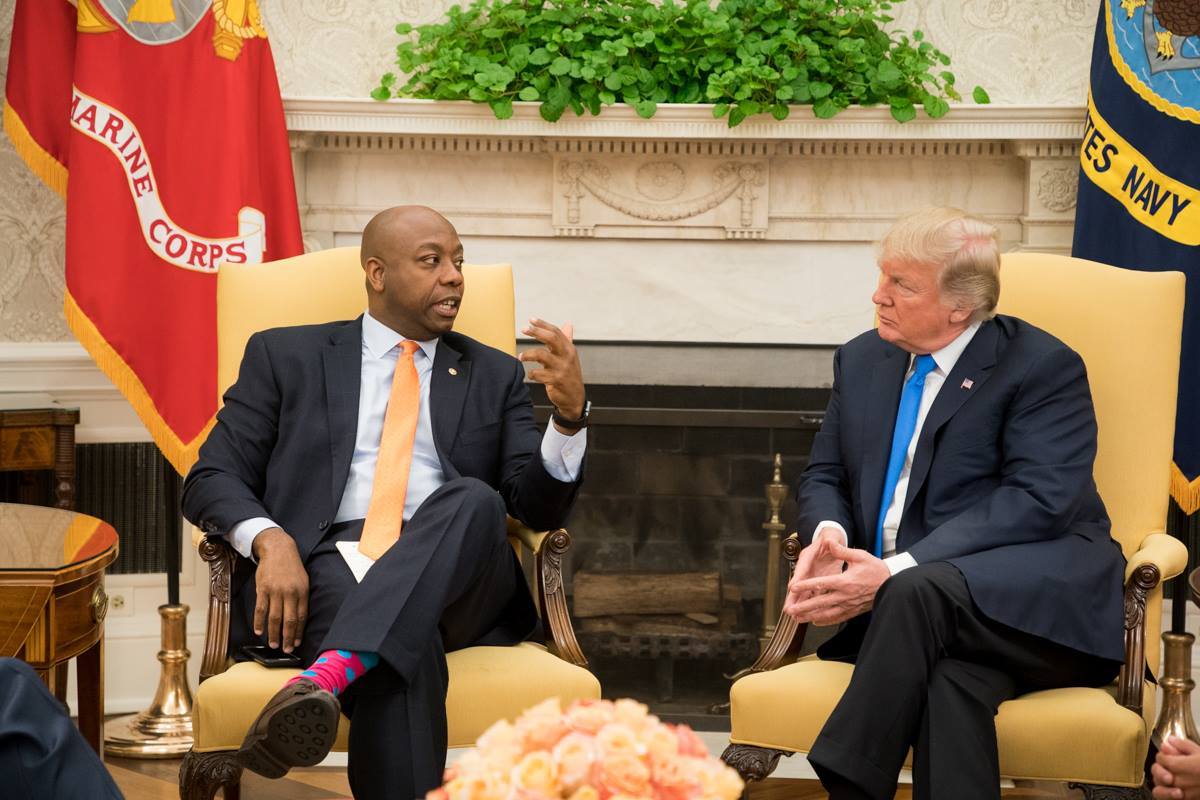
Scott with President Donald Trump in 2017

==== Justice Act ====
Scott led the drafting of a bill on race and police reform. Amid skeptical reactions from others in the black community, he tweeted, "Not surprising the last 24 hours have seen a lot of 'token' 'boy' or 'you're being used' in my mentions" and "Let me get this straight ... you DON'T want the person who has faced racial profiling by police, been pulled over dozens of times, or been speaking out for YEARS drafting this?".

Scott's 106-page Justice Act included:

- Increased federal reporting requirements for use of force, no-knock warrants.
- Increased penalties for false police reports.
- Withheld funding for police departments that allow chokeholds when deadly force is not authorized.
- Grants for expanding police body cameras with penalties for failing to use them.
- Creation of a database of police disciplinary records for use in hiring.
- Creation of a federal crime for lynching.
- Direction that the Justice Department provide training on deescalation tactics and implement duty-to-intervene policies.

The bill lacked provisions demanded by Democrats, including restrictions on qualified immunity. Nancy Pelosi called Scott's bill "inadequate", and said Republicans "understand that there's a need to get something done. ... They admit that and have some suggestions that are worthy of consideration—but so far, they were trying to get away with murder, actually—the murder of George Floyd." Senate Minority Whip Democrat Dick Durbin called the bill "token" legislation, although he later apologized to Scott. Two Democrats and one Independent senator who caucuses with Democrats broke with the party to support Scott's bill, but, ultimately, Democrats used the filibuster to block it; it received 55 of the required 60 votes.

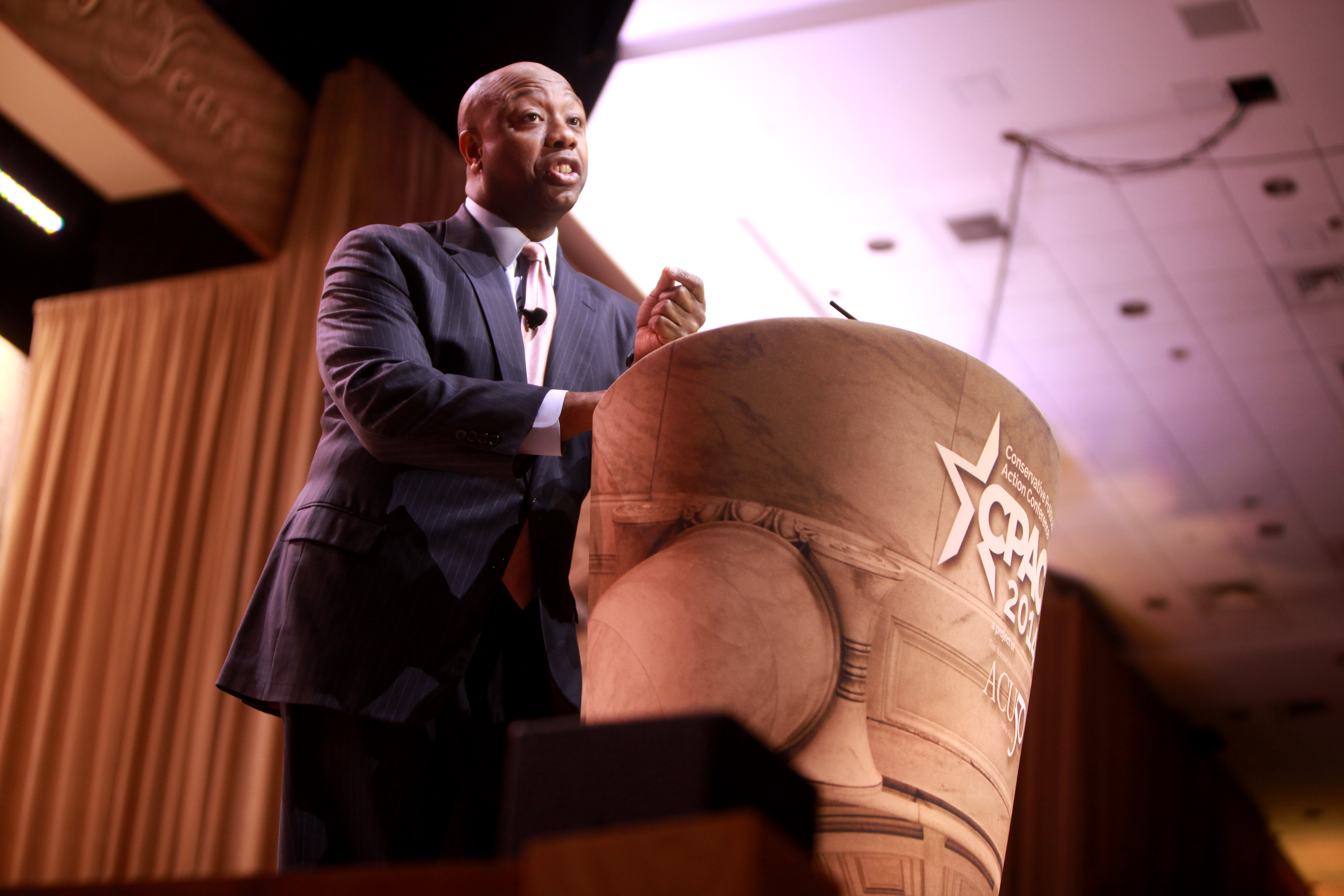
Scott speaking at the 2014 Conservative Political Action Conference (CPAC) in National Harbor, Maryland

==== Housing ====
In 2026, the U.S. Senate passed Scott's and Sen. Elizabeth Warren's 21st Century ROAD to Housing Act, which included several legislative proposals to address the American housing shortage.

=== Senate committee assignments ===
==== Current ====
- Committee on Banking, Housing, and Urban Affairs (Chair)
  - As chair of the full committee, Scott is entitled ex officio to sit as a member of all subcommittees
- Committee on Finance
  - Subcommittee on Energy, Natural Resources, and Infrastructure
  - Subcommittee on International Trade, Customs, and Global Competitiveness
  - Subcommittee on Health Care
- Committee on Health, Education, Labor, and Pensions
  - Subcommittee on Education and the American Family
  - Subcommittee on Employment and Workplace Safety
- Committee on Small Business and Entrepreneurship
- Commission on Security and Cooperation in Europe

=== Caucus memberships ===
- Senate Taiwan Caucus

== 2024 presidential campaign ==
In February 2023, it was reported that Scott was preparing for a presidential run. He announced a "listening tour" that would include a Black History Month event in Charleston, South Carolina, as the tour's first stop and then hosted events and speeches throughout Iowa, the first state to vote in the 2024 Republican presidential primaries. Other announced and suspected Republican candidates also hosted events in Iowa at the same time as Scott.

On April 12, 2023, Scott formed an exploratory committee to potentially run for president. On May 19, he filed with the Federal Election Commission to run for president. He formally announced his candidacy on May 22, in North Charleston, South Carolina.

Scott announced the suspension of his campaign on Fox News's Sunday Night in America with Trey Gowdy on November 12, 2023.

== Political positions ==
=== Taxes and spending ===
Scott believes that federal spending and taxes should be reduced.

=== Health care ===
Scott believes the Affordable Care Act (ACA) should be repealed. He has said that U.S. health care is among the greatest in the world, that people all over the world come to study in American medical schools, waiting lists are rare, and that Americans are able to choose their insurance, providers, and course of treatment. Scott supports an alternative to the ACA that he says keeps its benefits while controlling costs by reforming the medical tort system by limiting non-economic damages and by reforming Medicare.

In January 2019, Scott was one of six senators to cosponsor the Health Insurance Tax Relief Act, delaying the Health Insurance Tax for two years.

=== Economic development ===
Scott supports infrastructure development and public works for his district. He opposes restrictions on deepwater oil drilling.

Scott was among the 31 Senate Republicans who voted against final passage of the Fiscal Responsibility Act of 2023.

As the Senate Banking Committee Chair, Scott has openly supported the cryptocurrency industry. At a crypto symposium in Jackson Hole, he said the industry should "fire the legislators that are in your way".

=== Social issues ===
Scott describes himself as pro-life and has been a vocal opponent of abortion. He supports adult and cord blood stem cell research, but opposes taxpayer-funded embryonic stem cell research and the creation of human embryos for experimentation. In a 2023 interview, he said he would sign a 20-week federal abortion ban into law if elected president. He also opposes assisted suicide. While campaigning for president, he has dodged questions about whether he supports a six-week abortion ban.

Scott opposes same-sex marriage, and voted against the Respect for Marriage Act of 2022, which provided federal statutory recognition of same-sex marriage.

In 2022 and 2023, he and Senator Rick Scott (no relation) co-sponsored the PROTECT Kids Act, a bill that would cut federal funding to schools unless they informed parents of changes in children's "pronouns, gender markers, or sex-based accommodations (including locker rooms and bathrooms)." On August 23, 2023, in a debate between Republican presidential candidates, he said: "If God made you a man, you play sports—against men."

=== Immigration ===
Scott supports federal legislation similar to Arizona SB 1070. He supports strengthening penalties for employers who knowingly hire illegal immigrants. He also promotes cultural assimilation by making English the official language in the government and requiring new immigrants to learn English. He opposes a pathway to citizenship for undocumented immigrants.

=== Labor ===
Scott introduced a bill that would deny food stamps to families whose incomes declined to the point of eligibility because a family member was participating in a labor strike.

=== Foreign policy ===
Scott advocated continued military presence in Afghanistan and believed early withdrawal would benefit al-Qaeda. He views Iran as the world's most dangerous country and believes the U.S. should aid pro-democracy groups there. Scott opposed the 2011 military intervention in Libya.

Scott rejected calls for a ceasefire in the Gaza war, saying: "You cannot negotiate with evil. You have to destroy it." He opposed sending humanitarian aid to Palestinian civilians in the Gaza Strip. In a November 2023 Republican presidential primary debate, Scott suggested there could be no U.S.-Iranian diplomatic settlement; when asked about attacks by Iranian proxy forces in Iraq and Syria, he responded, "You actually have to cut off the head of the snake, and the head of the snake is Iran and not simply their proxies."

==== China ====
In November 2017, in response to efforts by China to purchase U.S. tech companies, Scott was one of nine cosponsors of a bill that would broaden the federal government's ability to prevent foreign purchases of U.S. firms by strengthening the Committee on Foreign Investment in the United States (CFIUS) to allow it to review and possibly decline smaller investments and add national security factors, including whether information about Americans would be exposed as part of transactions or whether a deal would facilitate fraud.

==== Trade ====
In January 2018, Scott was one of 36 Republican senators to sign a letter asking Trump to preserve the North American Free Trade Agreement in modernized form.

=== Police body cameras ===
After the shooting of Walter Scott (no relation), Scott urged the Senate to hold hearings on police body cameras.

=== Environment ===
In 2017, Scott was one of 22 senators to sign a letter to President Donald Trump urging him to withdraw the United States from the Paris Agreement. In the 2012, 2014, and 2016 election cycles, Scott's campaigns received over $540,000 in political donations from oil, gas and coal interests.

=== Judicial nominations ===
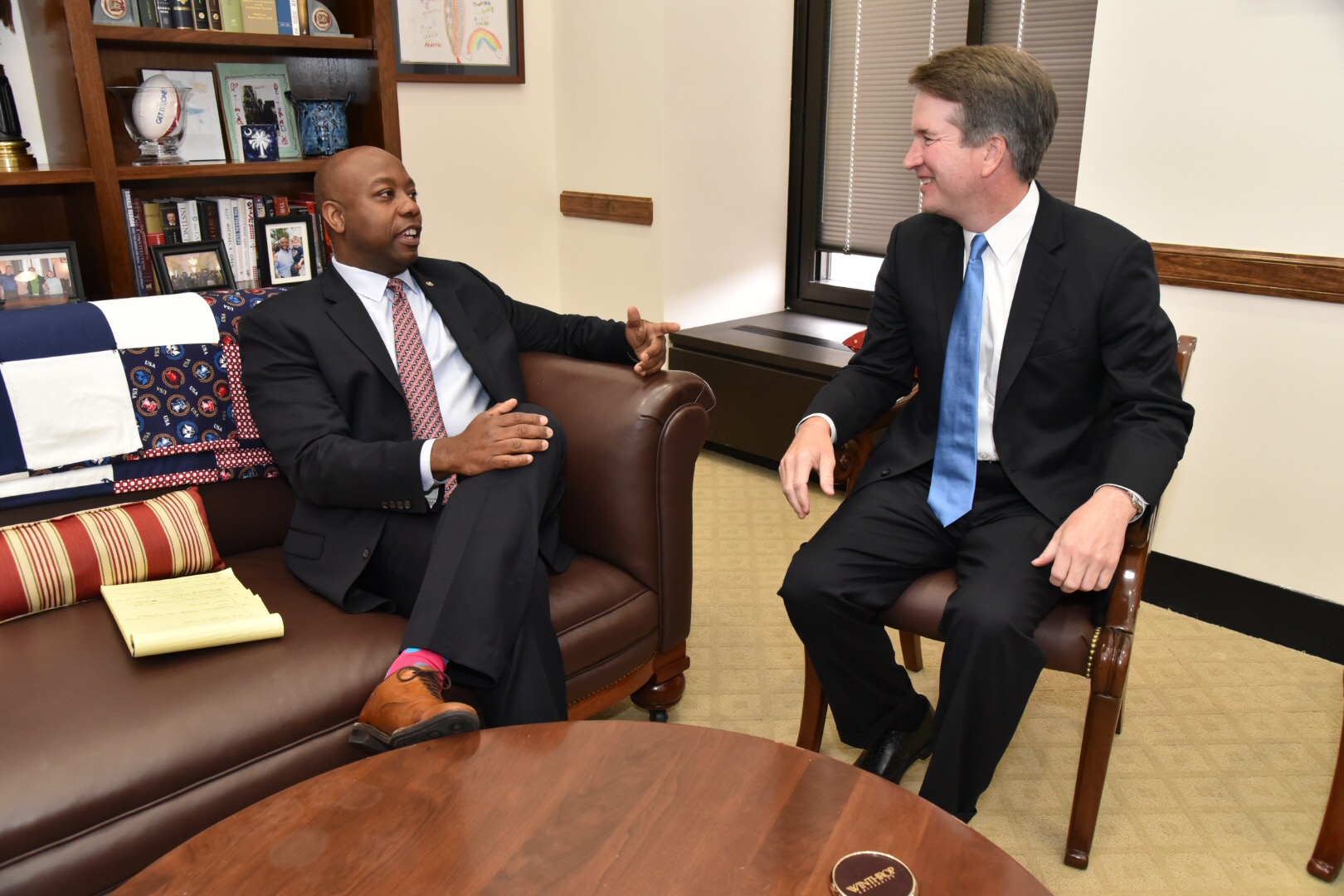
Scott meets with Judge Brett Kavanaugh in July 2018.

Scott did not support the nomination of Ryan Bounds to the 9th U.S. Circuit Court of Appeals, effectively killing the nomination. His decision was based on what he called Bounds's "bigoted statements he made as a Stanford student in the 1990s." Marco Rubio joined him in opposing the nomination shortly thereafter, prompting Mitch McConnell to drop the nomination.

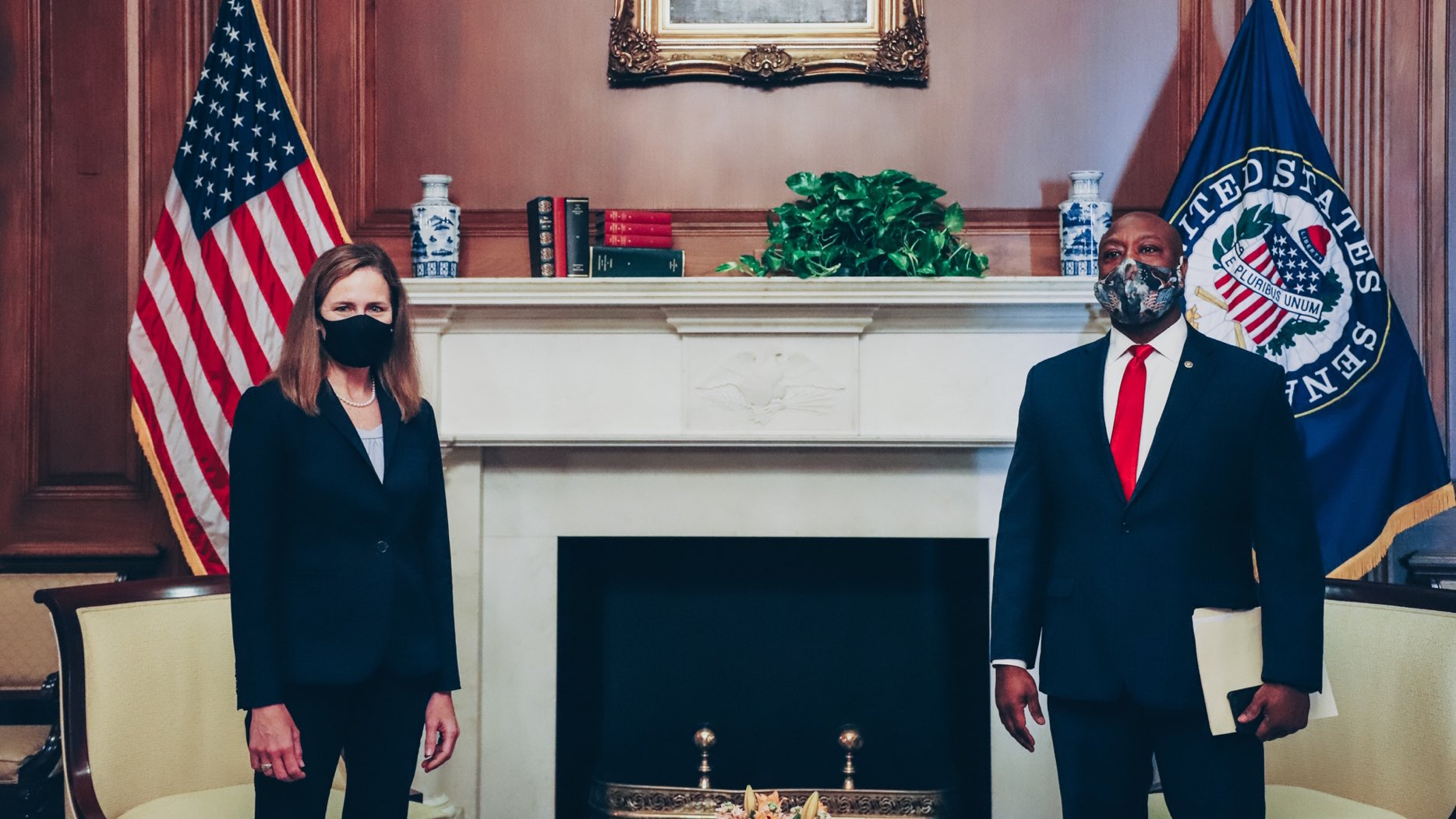
Scott with Judge Amy Coney Barrett in September 2020

In November 2018, Scott bucked his party in opposing the nomination of Thomas A. Farr for a federal judgeship. Farr had been accused of suppression of African-American voters. Scott cited Farr's involvement in the 1984 and 1990 Senate campaigns of Jesse Helms, which sought to suppress black voters, and a 1991 memo from the Department of Justice under the George H. W. Bush administration that stated that "Farr was the primary coordinator of the 1984 'ballot security' program conducted by the NCGOP and 1984 Helms for Senate Committee. He coordinated several 'ballot security' activities in 1984, including a postcard mailing to voters in predominantly black precincts that was designed to serve as a basis to challenge voters on election day." Further explaining his vote, Scott said the Republican Party was "not doing a very good job of avoiding the obvious potholes on race in America." In an editorial, the Wall Street Journal criticized Scott, arguing that Democrats would see Farr's defeat as a "vindication of their most underhanded and inflammatory racial tactics." In a letter to the Wall Street Journal, Scott said the publication was trying to "deflect concerns" about Farr's nomination.

=== President Trump and racism ===
In 2017, Scott reacted to the Unite the Right rally in Charlottesville by acknowledging that "Racism is real. It is alive." Asked to comment on Trump's statement that there had been "good people" on both sides at the rally and that there was "blame on both sides" for the violence that ensued, Scott said that while Trump had initially "rejected hatred, bigotry, and racism" in his "strong" comments on the ensuing Monday, his comments on Tuesday "started erasing the comments that were strong. What we want to see from our president is clarity and moral authority. And that moral authority is compromised when Tuesday happens. There's no question about that [...] I'm not going to defend the indefensible."

After meeting with Trump, Scott said that Trump "was very receptive to listening" and had "obviously reflected on what he's said, on his intentions and the perceptions of those comments" which were "not exactly what he intended".

Scott called upon Trump to delete his tweets that attacked demonstrators against the murder of George Floyd. Scott said, "Those are not constructive tweets, without any question. I'm thankful that we can have the conversation. ... We talked about the fact that there is a constructive way to have a dialogue with a nation in this similar fashion that we had a conversation after Charlottesville, the President will listen, if you engage him with the facts of the issue". Scott also advocated that Trump delete his retweet of supporters chanting "white power", which he soon did.

In February 2026, after Trump posted a video on Truth Social depicting Barack Obama and Michelle Obama as monkeys, Scott called on Trump to delete the post, calling it "the most racist thing I've seen out of this White House".

=== One Big Beautiful Bill Act ===
In his capacity as chair of the Banking Committee, Scott introduced a provision to the One Big Beautiful Bill Act that would have eliminated Federal Reserve funding for the Consumer Financial Protection Bureau (CFPB). After the Senate Parliamentarian ruled that this provision would violate the rules of reconciliation, the provision was amended to merely reduce Federal Reserve funding for the CFPB.

In response to a Congressional Budget Office (CBO) assessment of the One Big Beautiful Bill Act that estimated the law would add trillions to the national debt and result in 11 million people losing their health insurance, Scott released a video on X criticizing the CBO. His speech made nine factual errors in one minute, including multiple claims that the CBO had made faulty predictions several years before the CBO had even been established. The video received a Community Note addressing his inaccurate statements.

=== Endorsements ===
Scott meeting during Washington DC orientation with U.S. Senator-elect Annie Andrews, November 2026. Andrews defeated US Senate appointee Darline Graham, Republican nominee who ran to fill the seat held by her late brother Lindsey Graham.

Scott endorsed Lindsey Graham in the 2026 United States Senate race, and served in a leadership capacity on Graham's campaign team.

== Electoral history ==
1996 South Carolina Senate District 42 election
Party	Candidate	Votes	%
Democratic	Robert Ford	11,315	64.9%
Republican	Tim Scott	6,110	35.0%
Write-in		17	0.1%
Total votes		17,442	100.0%

2000 Charleston County Council election
Party	Candidate	Votes	%
Republican	Barrett Lawrimore	59,603	16.4%
Republican	Tim Scott	56,370	15.5%
Republican	Curtis Bostic	54,464	15.0%
Republican	A D Jordan	51,294	14.1%
Democratic	Chris Murphy	46,337	12.7%
Democratic	Edie Carson	44,731	12.3%
Democratic	Rose Marie West	43,189	11.9%
Libertarian	Barry Dively	8,246	2.3%
Write-in		53	0.01%
Total votes		364,287	100.0%

2004 Charleston County Council District 3 election
Party	Candidate	Votes	%
Republican	Tim Scott	5,569	60.9%
Democratic	Elliott Summey	3,573	39.1%
Write-in		2	0.02%
Total votes		9,144	100.0%

Republican Primary – 2008 South Carolina General Assembly 117th District
Party	Candidate	Votes	%
Republican	Tim Scott	1,333	53.3
Republican	Bill Crosby	647	25.9
Republican	Wheeler Tillman	521	20.8
Total votes		2,501	100

General election 2008 – South Carolina General Assembly 117th District
Party	Candidate	Votes	%
Republican	Tim Scott	9,080	99.3
Write-in		67	0.7
Total votes		9,147	100
Turnout			76.0

Republican Primary – 2010 1st Congressional District of South Carolina
Party	Candidate	Votes	%
Republican	Tim Scott	25,457	31.5
Republican	Paul Thurmond	13,149	16.3
Republican	Carroll Campbell III	11,665	14.4
Republican	Larry Kobrovsky	8,521	10.5
Republican	Stovall Witte	7,192	8.9
Republican	Clark B Parker	6,769	8.4
Republican	Katherine Jenerette	3,849	4.8
Republican	Mark Lutz	3,237	4.0
Republican	Ken Glasson	1,006	1.2
Total votes		80,845	100
Turnout			24.1

2010 South Carolina's 1st congressional district Republican primary runoff
Party	Candidate	Votes	%
Republican	Tim Scott	46,989	68.3%
Republican	Paul Thurmond	21,799	31.7%
Total votes		68,788	100.0%

2010 South Carolina's 1st congressional district election
Party	Candidate	Votes	%
Republican	Tim Scott (incumbent)	152,755	65.4%
Democratic	Ben Frasier	67,008	28.7%
Working Families	Rob Groce	4,148	1.8%
Green	Robert Dobbs	3,369	1.4%
Libertarian	Keith Blandford	2,750	1.2%
Independent	Jimmy Wood	2,489	1.1%
Independent	M E Mac McCullough	1,013	0.43%
Write-in		163	0.07%
Total votes		233,695	100.0%

South Carolina's 1st congressional district, 2012
Party	Candidate	Votes	%
Republican	Tim Scott (incumbent)	179,908	62.0
Democratic	Bobbie G. Rose	103,557	35.7
Libertarian	Keith Blandford	6,334	2.2
n/a	Write-ins	214	0.1
Total votes		290,013	100
Republican hold			

2014 United States Senate Special Republican Primary Election in South Carolina
Party	Candidate	Votes	%
Republican	Tim Scott (incumbent)	276,147	90.0
Republican	Randall Young	30,741	10.0
Total votes		306,888	100
Turnout			16.0

2014 United States Senate special election in South Carolina
Party	Candidate	Votes	%
Republican	Tim Scott (incumbent)	757,215	61.1
Democratic	Joyce Dickerson	459,583	37.1
Independent	Jill Bossi	21,652	1.8
Write-in		532	nil
Total votes		1,238,982	100
Turnout			43.0

2016 United States Senate election in South Carolina
Party	Candidate	Votes	%
Republican	Tim Scott (incumbent)	1,241,609	60.6
Democratic	Thomas Dixon	757,022	36.9
Libertarian	Bill Bledsoe	37,482	1.8
American	Michael Scarborough	11,923	0.6
Write-in		1,857	nil
Total votes		2,049,893	100

2022 United States Senate election in South Carolina
Party	Candidate	Votes	%
Republican	Tim Scott (incumbent)	1,066,274	62.9
Democratic	Krystle Matthews	627,616	37.0
Write-in		1,812	0.1
Total votes		1,695,702	100

== Personal life ==
During the late 1990s, Scott publicly declared himself a virgin, and claimed to have taken a pledge of abstinence until marriage. In 2012, when asked if he was still following his pledge, he replied, "Not as well as I did then."

In May 2023, Scott shared details about being in a relationship with an unnamed girlfriend. In November 2023, he publicly announced he was dating Mindy Noce, an interior designer from Charleston. The couple appeared together at the third 2024 Republican primary debate. On January 21, 2024, Scott announced their engagement. They married on August 3, 2024, in Mount Pleasant, South Carolina.

Before entering politics, Scott worked in the insurance and real estate industries, becoming the owner of Tim Scott Allstate and a partner in Pathway Real Estate Group, LLC. He is a member of Seacoast Church, a large evangelical church in Charleston.

== See also ==
- African-American candidates for President of the United States
- Black conservatism in the United States
- List of African-American Republicans
- List of African-American United States presidential and vice presidential candidates
- List of African-American United States representatives
- List of African-American United States Senate candidates
- List of African-American United States senators
- Timeline of African-American firsts

U.S. House of Representatives
Preceded by Henry Brown	Member of the U.S. House of Representatives from South Carolina's 1st congressional district 2011–2013	Succeeded by Mark Sanford
U.S. Senate
Preceded by Jim DeMint	U.S. Senator (Class 3) from South Carolina; 2013–present Served alongside: Lindsey Graham, Darline Graham, Annie Andrews (elect)	Incumbent
Preceded by Bob Casey Jr.	Ranking Member of the Senate Aging Committee; 2021–2023	Succeeded by Mike Braun
Preceded by Pat Toomey	Ranking Member of the Senate Banking Committee; 2023–2025	Succeeded by Elizabeth Warren
Preceded by Sherrod Brown	Chair of the Senate Banking Committee; 2025–present	Incumbent
Party political offices
Preceded by Jim DeMint	Republican nominee for U.S. Senator from South Carolina (Class 3); 2014, 2016, 2022	Most recent
Preceded by Gretchen Whitmer	Response to the State of the Union address 2021	Succeeded by Kim Reynolds
Preceded by Steve Daines	Chair of the National Republican Senatorial Committee; 2025–present	Incumbent
U.S. order of precedence (ceremonial)
Preceded by Elizabeth Warren	Order of precedence of the United States as United States Senator	Succeeded by Tim Kaine
Preceded by Brian Schatz	United States senators by seniority 34th	Succeeded by Tammy Baldwin
