= 2022 United States Senate election in South Carolina =

- November 8, 2022
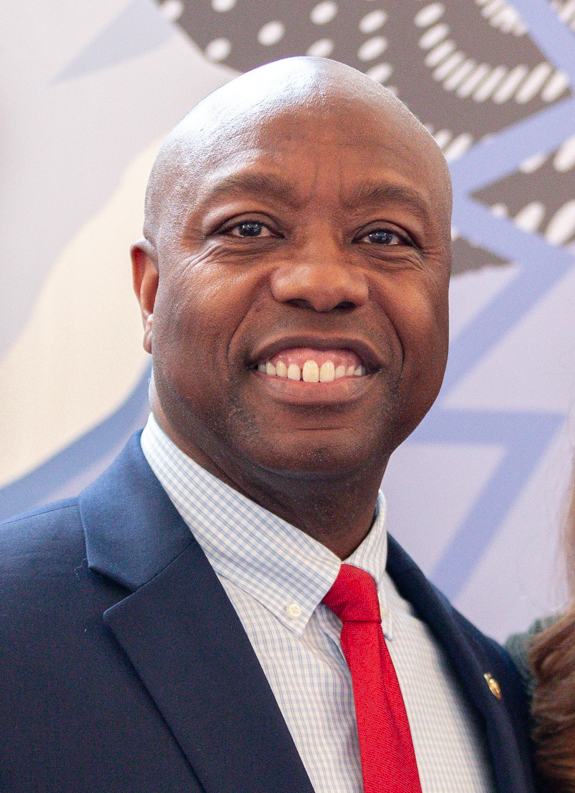

Nominee	Tim Scott	Krystle Matthews
Party	Republican	Democratic
Popular vote	1,066,274	627,616
Percentage	62.88%	37.01%
- Scott: 50–60% 60–70% 70–80% 80–90% >90% Matthews: 50–60% 60–70% 70–80% 80–90% >90% No data
U.S. senator before election
Tim Scott
Republican
Elected U.S. senator
Tim Scott
Republican

The 2022 United States Senate election in South Carolina was held on November 8, 2022, to elect a member of the United States Senate to represent the state of South Carolina. Incumbent Republican Senator Tim Scott won reelection to a second full term, defeating State Representative Krystle Matthews. This was the third consecutive election for this seat in which both major party nominees were Black.

Scott was appointed to the U.S. Senate in 2013 following the resignation of fellow Republican Jim DeMint. With 61.1% of the vote, he won the 2014 special election to serve the remainder of DeMint's term. Scott was then re-elected to a full six-year term in 2016 with 60.6% of the vote.

Primary elections in South Carolina were held on June 14, 2022. Scott won the Republican primary unopposed, while Matthews won the Democratic primary in a June 28 runoff against historic preservationist Catherine Fleming Bruce.

== Republican primary ==
=== Candidates ===
==== Nominee ====
- Tim Scott, incumbent U.S. senator (2013–present)

==== Withdrawn ====
- Timothy Swain (opted to run for State House seat 121, defeated in primary)

=== Endorsements ===
Tim Scott

Executive branch officials

- Nikki Haley, former United States ambassador to the United Nations (2017–2018) and former governor of South Carolina (2011–2017)
- Mike Pence, 48th vice president of the United States (2017–2021)
- Mike Pompeo, former U.S. secretary of state (2018–2021)
- Donald Trump, 45th president of the United States (2017–2021)

U.S. senators

- Lindsey Graham, U.S. senator from South Carolina (2003–2026)
- Mitch McConnell, minority leader of the United States Senate (2021–2025), U.S. senator from Kentucky (1985–present)

U.S. representatives

- Jeff Duncan, U.S. representative from South Carolina's 3rd congressional district (2011–2025)
- Nancy Mace, U.S. representative from South Carolina's 1st congressional district (2021–present)
- Ralph Norman, U.S. representative from South Carolina's 5th congressional district (2017–present)
- Tom Rice, U.S. representative from South Carolina's 7th congressional district (2013–2023)
- William Timmons, U.S. representative from South Carolina's 4th congressional district (2019–present)
- Joe Wilson, U.S. representative from South Carolina's 2nd congressional district (2001–present)

Individuals

- Drew McKissick, chair of the South Carolina Republican Party (2017–present)

Organizations

- Black America's Political Action Committee
- Pro-Israel America

== Democratic primary ==
=== Candidates ===
==== Nominee ====
- Krystle Matthews, former state representative (2018–2022)

==== Eliminated in runoff ====
- Catherine Fleming Bruce, author and activist

==== Eliminated in primary ====
- Angela Geter, former chair of the Spartanburg County Democratic Party candidate for South Carolina House of Representatives in 2017 and candidate in the 2024 South Carolina Senate election

=== First round ===
==== Results ====
Initial primary results by county: Bruce: 30–40%; 40–50%; Matthews: 30–40%; 40–50%; Geter: 30–40%; 40–50%; 50–60%

Democratic primary results
Party	Candidate	Votes	%
Democratic	Catherine Fleming Bruce	59,777	34.69%
Democratic	Krystle Matthews	57,278	33.24%
Democratic	Angela Geter	55,281	32.08%
Total votes		172,336	100.0%

=== Runoff ===
==== Results ====
Primary runoff results by county: Matthews: 50–60%; 60–70%; 70–80%; 80–90%; Bruce: 50–60%; 60–70%; 70–80%

Democratic primary runoff results
Party	Candidate	Votes	%
Democratic	Krystle Matthews	25,300	55.77%
Democratic	Catherine Fleming Bruce	20,064	44.23%
Total votes		45,364	100.0%

== General election ==
=== Predictions ===
Source	Ranking	As of
The Cook Political Report	Solid R	November 19, 2021
Inside Elections	Solid R	January 7, 2022
Sabato's Crystal Ball	Safe R	November 3, 2021
Politico	Solid R	April 1, 2022
RCP	Safe R	January 10, 2022
Fox News	Solid R	May 12, 2022
DDHQ	Solid R	July 20, 2022
538	Solid R	June 30, 2022
The Economist	Safe R	September 7, 2022

=== Endorsements ===
Tim Scott (R)

Executive branch officials

- Nikki Haley, former United States ambassador to the United Nations (2017–2018) and former governor of South Carolina (2011–2017)
- Mike Pence, 48th vice president of the United States (2017–2021)
- Mike Pompeo, former U.S. secretary of state (2018–2021)
- Donald Trump, 45th president of the United States (2017–2021)

U.S. senators

- Lindsey Graham, U.S. senator from South Carolina (2003–present)
- Mitch McConnell, U.S. Senate minority leader from Kentucky (1985–present)

U.S. representatives

- Jeff Duncan, U.S. representative from South Carolina's 3rd congressional district (2011–2025)
- Nancy Mace, U.S. representative from South Carolina's 1st congressional district (2021–present)
- Ralph Norman, U.S. representative from South Carolina's 5th congressional district (2017–present)
- Tom Rice, U.S. representative from South Carolina's 7th congressional district (2013–2023)
- William Timmons, U.S. representative from South Carolina's 4th congressional district (2019–present)
- Joe Wilson, U.S. representative from South Carolina's 2nd congressional district (2001–present)

Individuals

- Drew McKissick, chair of the South Carolina Republican Party (2017–present)

Organizations

- American Israel Public Affairs Committee
- Black America's PAC
- Campaign for Working Families
- Citizens Against Government Waste
- ClearPath Action Fund
- National Rifle Association - Political Victory Fund
- National Right to Life Committee
- Pro-Israel America
- Stand for America PAC

=== Polling ===
Poll source	Date(s) administered	Sample size (Note: Key: A – all adults RV – registered voters LV – likely voters V – unclear)	Margin of error	Tim Scott (R)	Krystle Matthews (D)	Larry Adams Jr. (I)	Other	Undecided
Echelon Insights	August 31 – September 7, 2022	600 (RV)	± 5.1%	54%	37%	–	–	9%
Moore Information Group (R)	March 8–13, 2022	500 (LV)	± 4.0%	57%	25%	5%	2%	11%

=== Results ===
2022 United States Senate election in South Carolina
Party	Candidate	Votes	%	±%
Republican	Tim Scott (incumbent)	1,066,274	62.88%	+2.31%
Democratic	Krystle Matthews	627,616	37.01%	+0.08%
Write-in		1,812	0.11%	+0.02%
Total votes		1,695,702	100.00%	N/A
Republican hold				

==== By county ====
Scott won 37 of 46 counties.

County	Tim Scott Republican		Krystle Matthews Democratic		Write-in Various		Margin		Total
County	#	%	#	%	#	%	#	%	Total
Abbeville	6,259	73.01%	2,310	26.95%	4	0.05%	3,949	46.06%	8,573
Aiken	37,549	68.55%	17,180	31.36%	50	0.09%	20,369	37.18%	54,779
Allendale	585	32.34%	1,224	67.66%	0	0.00%	-639	-35.32%	1,809
Anderson	48,801	77.14%	14,391	22.75%	72	0.11%	34,410	54.39%	63,264
Bamberg	1,820	45.86%	2,149	54.14%	0	0.00%	-329	-8.29%	3,969
Barnwell	3,808	60.78%	2,453	39.15%	4	0.06%	1,355	21.63%	6,265
Beaufort	45,023	63.05%	26,337	36.88%	45	0.06%	18,686	26.17%	71,405
Berkeley	44,407	62.45%	26,622	37.44%	75	0.11%	17,785	25.01%	71,104
Calhoun	3,430	61.26%	2,159	38.56%	10	0.18%	1,271	22.70%	5,599
Charleston	79,586	52.43%	71,983	47.42%	230	0.15%	7,603	5.01%	151,799
Cherokee	12,753	79.11%	3,355	20.81%	12	0.07%	9,398	58.30%	16,120
Chester	5,954	62.16%	3,621	37.80%	4	0.04%	2,333	25.36%	9,579
Chesterfield	8,298	66.18%	4,234	33.77%	6	0.05%	4,064	32.41%	12,538
Clarendon	6,612	57.95%	4,792	42.00%	6	0.05%	1,820	15.95%	11,410
Colleton	7,747	61.94%	4,750	37.98%	10	0.08%	2,997	23.96%	12,507
Darlington	12,116	60.50%	7,898	39.44%	12	0.06%	4,218	21.06%	20,026
Dillon	4,456	56.53%	3,420	43.39%	6	0.08%	1,036	13.14%	7,882
Dorchester	30,814	62.24%	18,643	37.65%	55	0.11%	12,171	24.58%	49,512
Edgefield	6,108	69.35%	2,686	30.50%	13	0.15%	3,422	38.86%	8,807
Fairfield	3,883	46.59%	4,444	53.32%	7	0.08%	-561	-6.73%	8,334
Florence	24,117	58.36%	17,171	41.55%	35	0.08%	6,946	16.81%	41,323
Georgetown	17,457	63.81%	9,885	36.13%	15	0.05%	7,572	27.68%	27,357
Greenville	117,974	66.50%	59,109	33.32%	316	0.18%	58,865	33.18%	177,399
Greenwood	15,033	69.07%	6,720	30.88%	12	0.06%	8,313	38.19%	21,765
Hampton	2,825	50.21%	2,799	49.75%	2	0.04%	26	0.46%	5,626
Horry	96,941	72.78%	36,198	27.17%	66	0.05%	60,743	45.60%	133,205
Jasper	6,554	59.10%	4,532	40.87%	4	0.04%	2,022	18.23%	11,090
Kershaw	14,935	66.95%	7,359	32.99%	14	0.06%	7,576	33.96%	22,308
Lancaster	23,159	67.15%	11,306	32.78%	23	0.07%	11,853	34.37%	34,488
Laurens	14,504	73.42%	5,214	26.39%	38	0.19%	9,290	47.02%	19,756
Lee	2,209	42.16%	3,028	57.79%	3	0.06%	-819	-15.63%	5,240
Lexington	70,113	70.74%	28,884	29.14%	112	0.11%	41,229	41.60%	99,109
Marion	3,952	47.18%	4,421	52.78%	4	0.05%	-469	-5.60%	8,377
Marlboro	3,308	51.00%	3,169	48.86%	9	0.14%	139	2.14%	6,486
McCormick	2,818	61.72%	1,748	38.28%	0	0.00%	1,070	23.43%	4,566
Newberry	8,967	70.32%	3,775	29.60%	10	0.08%	5,192	40.72%	12,752
Oconee	22,923	79.27%	5,975	20.66%	21	0.07%	16,948	58.61%	28,919
Orangeburg	10,024	38.35%	16,096	61.59%	16	0.06%	-6,072	-23.23%	26,136
Pickens	32,028	79.90%	8,012	19.99%	43	0.11%	24,016	59.92%	40,083
Richland	46,989	37.19%	79,130	62.63%	236	0.19%	-32,141	-25.44%	126,355
Saluda	4,938	75.45%	1,605	24.52%	2	0.03%	3,333	50.92%	6,545
Spartanburg	68,030	70.26%	28,681	29.62%	111	0.11%	39,349	40.64%	96,822
Sumter	15,100	49.40%	15,442	50.52%	24	0.08%	-342	-1.12%	30,566
Union	5,991	69.35%	2,646	30.63%	2	0.02%	3,345	38.72%	8,639
Williamsburg	4,047	41.53%	5,695	58.45%	2	0.02%	-1,648	-16.91%	9,744
York	61,329	64.04%	34,365	35.88%	71	0.07%	26,964	28.16%	95,765
Totals	1,066,274	62.88%	627,616	37.01%	1,812	0.11%	438,658	25.87%	1,695,702

==== Counties that flipped from Democratic to Republican ====
- Hampton (largest city: Hampton)
- Jasper (largest city: Hardeeville)
- Marlboro (largest city: Bennettsville)

==== By congressional district ====
Scott won six of seven congressional districts.

District	Scott	Matthews	Representative
1st	62%	38%	Nancy Mace
2nd	62%	38%	Joe Wilson
3rd	75%	25%	Jeff Duncan
4th	67%	33%	William Timmons
5th	65%	35%	Ralph Norman
6th	41%	59%	Jim Clyburn
7th	67%	33%	Tom Rice (117th Congress)
7th	67%	33%	Russell Fry (118th Congress)

== See also ==
- 2022 United States Senate elections
- 2022 South Carolina elections
