= Joyce Dickerson =

American politician (born 1945)

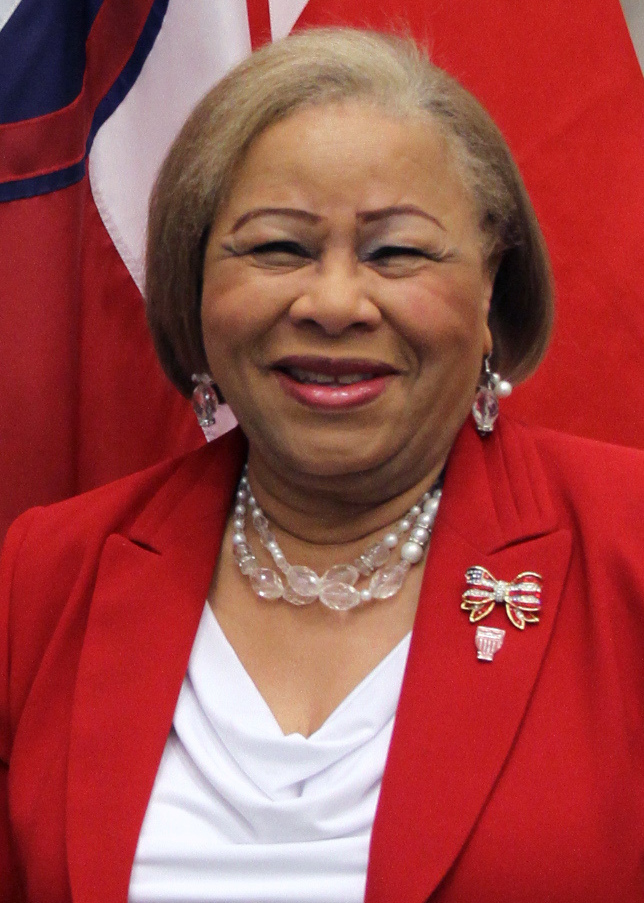

Chair of the Richland County Council
- In office January 2017 – January 2021
- Preceded by: Torrey Rush
- Succeeded by: Derrek Pugh

Personal details
- Born: June 14, 1945 (age 80) Savannah, Georgia, U.S.
- Party: Democratic
- Education: Midlands Technical College (AA); Benedict College (BA)

Joyce Dickerson (born June 14, 1945) is an American politician from South Carolina. She served three terms as a Richland County Councilwoman, including service as Chair, before a defeat in the 2020 general election to Derrek Pugh.

== Early life and career ==
Dickerson originally from Savannah, Georgia, moved to Columbia, South Carolina in 1975 after her husband retired from the United States Air Force. After moving to South Carolina, she attended Benedict College, graduating cum laude with a B.S. in Business Administration, and Midlands Technical College, graduating with an Associate's degree in Psychology. She worked as a compliance auditor, retiring in 2006.

Dickerson has been active in Democratic politics since the 1980s. She ran unsuccessfully for the South Carolina House of Representatives in 1996. She was elected to the Richland County Council in 2004, and has also served as State and Regional Director of the National Federation of Women Legislators, becoming Chair of NFWL in 2011. She served on the National Order for Women Legislators (NOWL) Telecommunication and Technology Task Force. Dickerson has also been active as a representative of Richland County on the National Multi Modal Transportation Steering Committee (NMMTSC), and served a two-year term on the Federal Communications Commission's Intergovernmental Advisory Committee. She is also a past President of the Women of the National Association of Counties and is a former Chairwoman of the Central Midlands Regional Transit Authority.

Dickerson was among a number of African American women from around the United States who endorsed Hillary Rodham Clinton for President in 2016.

== U.S. Senate campaign ==
In October 2013, Dickerson announced that she would challenge incumbent Republican senator Tim Scott for his seat in the November 2014 election. Dickerson defeated her primary opponents with 67% of the vote before losing the race to Scott in the general election.

== Selected works ==
- Dickerson, Joyce (2010). A Tribute to 101 Incredible Women of Distinction Who Influenced My Life from My House to the White House. Xlibris. ISBN 978-1450094511.

== See also ==
- Black women in American politics
- List of African-American United States Senate candidates

Party political offices
Preceded by Alvin Greene	Democratic nominee for U.S. Senator from South Carolina (Class 1); 2014	Succeeded by Thomas Dixon
