= Connor Dantzler =

American former AAU athlete

Connor Dantzler (born February 23, 1994) is an American former youth amateur athlete from Damascus, Maryland. In 2000, at the age of six, under the training of his father Mark Dantzler, he won his first junior national title in his age bracket. By 2012, Dantzler had won US national championship titles in judo, jujitsu, and powerlifting and earned awards as an AAU All-America and Athlete of the Year.

== Biography ==
In 2010, When Dantzler was 16, he earned World and Pan-American gold medals in the powerlifting. He appeared in Sports Illustrated's "Faces in the Crowd" at the age of ten. In 2005, he made a guest appearance on ABC’s The Tony Danza Show. In 2010, Dantzler earned the Joel Ferrell Memorial Award for Outstanding Performance at the AAU Junior Olympic Games. In 2011, he set an American record in his age category at the Collegiate Powerlifting National Championships as a high school student.
