= 2016 United States Senate election in South Carolina =

- November 8, 2016
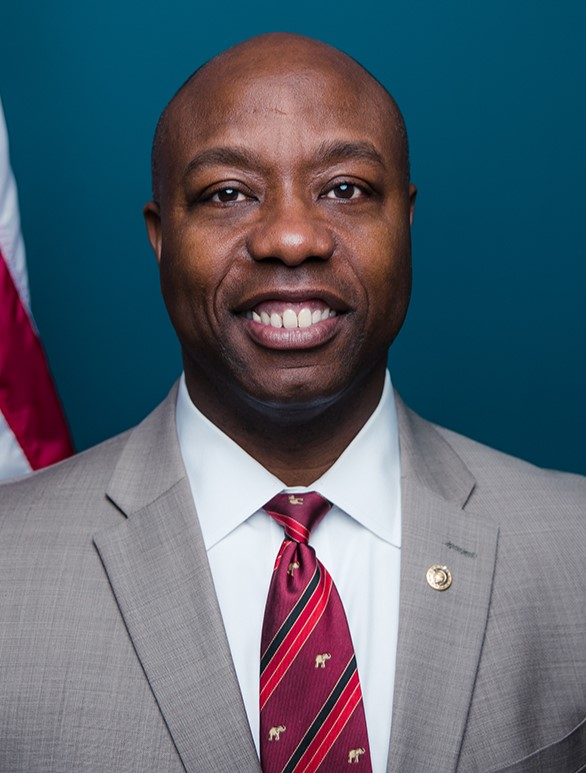

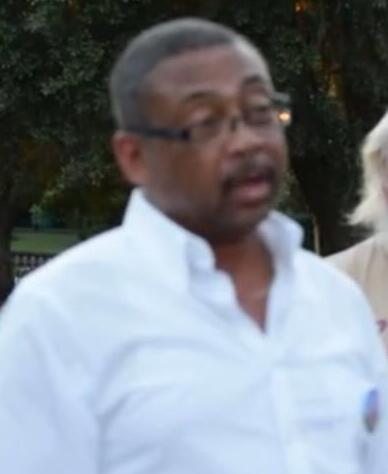
Nominee	Tim Scott	Thomas Dixon
Party	Republican	Democratic
Popular vote	1,241,609	757,022
Percentage	60.57%	36.93%
- Scott: 40–50% 50–60% 60–70% 70–80% 80–90% >90% Dixon: 40–50% 50–60% 60–70% 70–80% 80–90% >90% Tie: 40–50% No votes
U.S. senator before election
Tim Scott
Republican
Elected U.S. Senator
Tim Scott
Republican

The 2016 United States Senate election in South Carolina was held on November 8, 2016, to elect a member of the United States Senate to represent the State of South Carolina, concurrently with the 2016 U.S. presidential election, as well as other elections to the United States Senate in other states and elections to the United States House of Representatives and various state and local elections. Both major parties held their primaries on June 14.

Incumbent Republican Senator Tim Scott won re-election to a first full term in office.

This was the second U.S. Senate election in South Carolina (and the second of three consecutive elections for this seat) where both major party nominees were black, and the third overall since the passage of the Seventeenth Amendment. (Note: After Illinois in 2004 and South Carolina in 2014.)

== Background ==
Two-term Republican senator Jim DeMint was re-elected with 61.48% of the vote in 2010. He resigned at the start of 2013 to become president of the Heritage Foundation. U.S. Representative Tim Scott of South Carolina's 1st congressional district was appointed to replace him by Governor Nikki Haley. Scott subsequently won the special election in 2014 for the remaining two years of the term.

== Republican primary ==
=== Candidates ===
==== Declared ====
- Tim Scott, incumbent U.S. senator

== Democratic primary ==
=== Candidates ===
==== Declared ====
- Thomas Dixon, pastor and community activist (also running with Green Party nomination)

==== Declined ====
- Joyce Dickerson, Richland County councilwoman and nominee for the U.S. Senate in 2014 (running for reelection)

== General election ==
=== Candidates ===
- Bill Bledsoe (Libertarian, Constitution)
- Thomas Dixon (Democratic, Green), pastor and community activist
- Michael Scarborough (American), attorney
- Tim Scott (Republican), incumbent U.S. senator

=== Debates ===
Dates	Location	Scott	Dixon	Link
October 24, 2016	Greenville, South Carolina	Participant	Participant	

=== Predictions ===
Source	Ranking	As of
The Cook Political Report	Safe R	November 2, 2016
Sabato's Crystal Ball	Safe R	November 7, 2016
Rothenberg Political Report	Safe R	November 3, 2016
Daily Kos	Safe R	November 8, 2016
Real Clear Politics	Safe R	November 7, 2016

=== Polling ===
View source data.

Poll source	Date(s) administered	Sample size	Margin of error	Tim Scott (R)	Thomas Dixon (D)	Other	Undecided
SurveyMonkey	November 1–7, 2016	1,698	± 4.6%	59%	38%	–	3%
SurveyMonkey	October 31–November 6, 2016	1,642	± 4.6%	58%	39%	–	3%
SurveyMonkey	October 28–November 3, 2016	1,583	± 4.6%	58%	39%	–	3%
SurveyMonkey	October 27–November 2, 2016	1,501	± 4.6%	58%	39%	–	3%
SurveyMonkey	October 26–November 1, 2016	1,588	± 4.6%	57%	40%	–	3%
SurveyMonkey	October 25–31, 2016	1,762	± 4.6%	56%	39%	–	5%
Starboard Communications (R)	September 7–9, 2016	600	± 4.8%	58%	22%	–	16%
Public Policy Polling	August 9–10, 2016	1,290	± 2.7%	45%	30%	6%	20%

Hypothetical polling

with Joyce Dickerson

Poll source	Date(s) administered	Sample size	Margin of error	Tim Scott (R)	Joyce Dickerson (D)	Undecided
Public Policy Polling	November 7–8, 2015	1,290	± 2.7%	53%	25%	23%

with Bakari Sellers

Poll source	Date(s) administered	Sample size	Margin of error	Tim Scott (R)	Bakari Sellers (D)	Undecided
Public Policy Polling	February 12–15, 2015	868	± 3.3%	56%	28%	16%

with Leon Lott

Poll source	Date(s) administered	Sample size	Margin of error	Tim Scott (R)	Leon Lott (D)	Undecided
Public Policy Polling	February 12–15, 2015	868	± 3.3%	54%	27%	19%

with Jim Hodges

Poll source	Date(s) administered	Sample size	Margin of error	Tim Scott (R)	Jim Hodges (D)	Undecided
Public Policy Polling	February 12–15, 2015	868	± 3.3%	54%	32%	15%

=== Results ===
United States Senate election in South Carolina, 2016
Party	Candidate	Votes	%	±%
Republican	Tim Scott (incumbent)	1,241,609	60.57%	−0.55%
Democratic	Thomas Dixon	757,022	36.93%	−0.16%
Libertarian	Bill Bledsoe	37,482	1.83%	N/A
American	Michael Scarborough	11,923	0.58%	−1.17%
n/a	Write-ins	1,857	0.09%	+0.05%
Total votes		2,049,893	100.0%	N/A
Republican hold				

==== Counties that flipped from Democratic to Republican ====
- Calhoun (largest town: St. Matthews)
- Clarendon (largest city: Manning)

==== By congressional district ====
Scott won six of seven congressional districts.

District	Scott	Dixon	Representative
1st	65%	33%	Mark Sanford
2nd	63%	34%	Joe Wilson
3rd	71%	27%	Jeff Duncan
4th	67%	30%	Trey Gowdy
5th	59%	38%	Mick Mulvaney
6th	35%	63%	Jim Clyburn
7th	61%	37%	Tom Rice
