= Tom Dantzler =

American politician

Member of the South Carolina House of Representatives from the 117th district
- In office January 3, 1995 – January 3, 2009
- Preceded by: Roger M. Young
- Succeeded by: Tim Scott

Berkeley County Council Member
- In office 1979–1981

Personal details
- Born: Thomas Middleton Dantzler; June 6, 1941 Orangeburg, South Carolina, U.S.
- Died: August 12, 2023 (aged 82) Goose Creek, South Carolina, U.S.
- Party: Republican
- Education: University of Georgia (DVM); Clemson University (BS)

Military service
- Branch/service: United States Air Force

Tom Dantzler (June 6, 1941 – August 12, 2023) was an American veterinarian and politician who served as a member of the South Carolina House of Representatives for House District 117 between 1995 and 2009.

== Early life and education ==
Dantzler was born on June 6, 1941 in Orangeburg County, South Carolina to parents Harold and Leila. He completed a Doctor of Veterinary Medicine degree in 1965 from the University of Georgia. He graduated from Clemson University with a Bachelor of Science in 1982.

== Career ==
Dantzler served in the United States Air Force between 1965 and 1967. Between 1979 and 1981, Dantzler was a member of the Berkeley County Council. Between 1995 and 2009, Dantzler was a member of the South Carolina House of Representatives, serving House District 117 as a Republican. Dantzler was succeeded in office by Tim Scott.
