= 2014 United States Senate special election in South Carolina =

- November 4, 2014
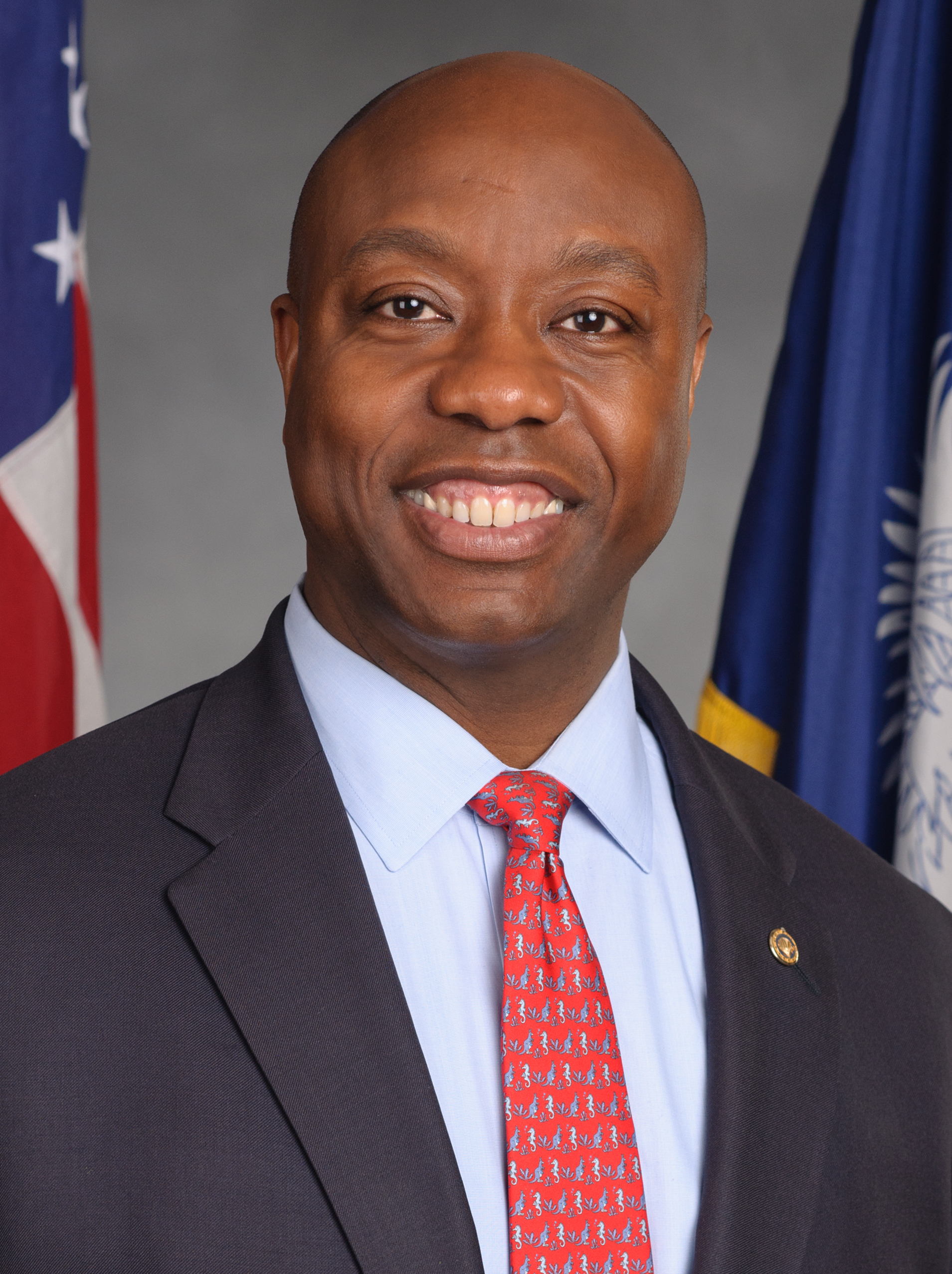

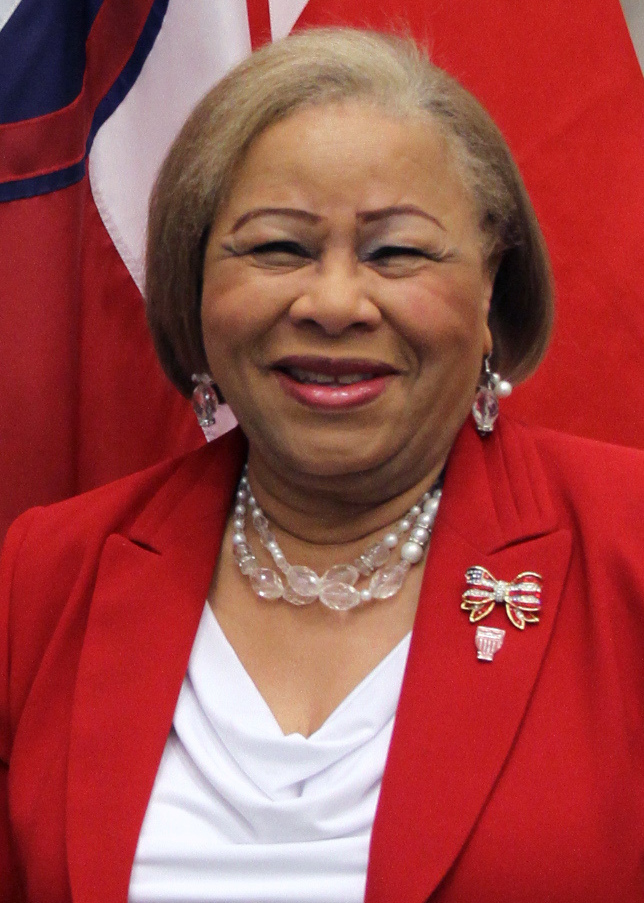
Nominee	Tim Scott	Joyce Dickerson
Party	Republican	Democratic
Popular vote	757,215	459,583
Percentage	61.12%	37.09%
- Scott: 40–50% 50–60% 60–70% 70–80% 80–90% Dickerson: 50–60% 60–70% 70–80%
U.S. senator before election
Tim Scott (Note: In January 2013, Scott was appointed by Governor Nikki Haley to fill the vacancy caused by the resignation of Senator Jim DeMint, who had become president of the Heritage Foundation.)
Republican
Elected U.S. Senator
Tim Scott
Republican

The 2014 United States Senate special election in South Carolina took place on November 4, 2014, concurrently with the regular election for the other South Carolina Senate seat. The special-election Senate seat was formerly held by Republican Jim DeMint, who resigned on January 2, 2013, to become president of the Heritage Foundation.

Nikki Haley, the Republican governor of South Carolina, announced the appointment of U.S. Representative Tim Scott to fill the seat. Scott ran in the special election and won by beating Democratic candidate and Richland County councilwoman Joyce Dickerson in the November election. Scott became the first black senator in the state's history and the first in a former Confederate state since 1881.

The election was noted for being the first in a former Confederate state in which both major party nominees were black. (Note: After Illinois in 2004) This was also the first of three consecutive elections to this seat in which both major party nominees were black.

== Background ==
On December 6, 2012, Senator Jim DeMint announced his intention to resign effective January 1, 2013, to become the president of the Heritage Foundation, a conservative think tank.

Nikki Haley, the governor of South Carolina, appointed a replacement to fill the seat until the special election. Haley indicated that she would not appoint a "placeholder" to the seat, but would appoint someone who would stand in a 2014 special election to serve the remaining two years of DeMint's term. On December 17, 2012, Haley announced that she would appoint Scott to DeMint's seat following his resignation.

=== Senate replacement process ===
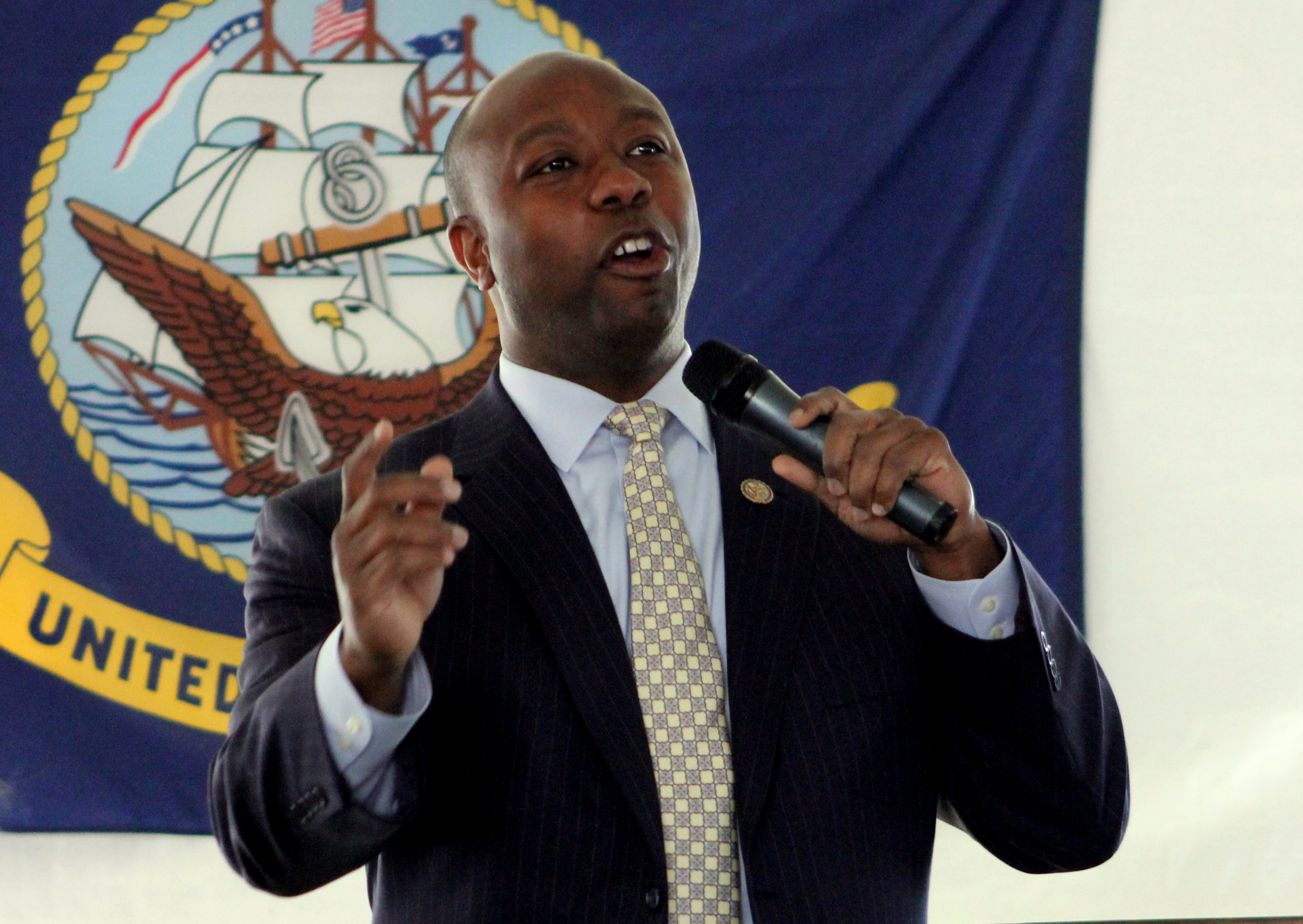
Congressman Tim Scott was chosen to replace Senator Jim DeMint, following his announced resignation.

According to sources close to Governor Haley, as of December 11, 2012, she had narrowed the list of potential appointees down to five:

- Trey Gowdy, U.S. representative (SC-04)
- Henry McMaster, former South Carolina attorney general
- Jenny Sanford, former First Lady of South Carolina
- Tim Scott, U.S. representative (SC-01)
- Catherine Templeton, head of the South Carolina Department of Health and Environmental Control

Other politicians mentioned as possible replacements for DeMint included U.S. Representatives Mick Mulvaney and Joe Wilson, former U.S. Representative Gresham Barrett, state representative Nathan Ballentine, South Carolina Attorney General Alan Wilson, former Ambassador to Canada David Wilkins, former South Carolina Republican Party chair Katon Dawson, and Haley's deputy chief of staff Tedd Pitts.

Liberal comedian Stephen Colbert, a South Carolina native, expressed interest in being appointed to the seat, asking his fans to tweet Haley that she should appoint him. Chad Walldorf, the owner of the Sticky Fingers restaurant chain, was also mentioned as a potential placeholder.

=== Polling on DeMint's replacement ===
A Public Policy Polling poll released on December 10, 2012, which asked respondents who they wanted to replace DeMint, showed Colbert with the highest total. He had support at 20 percent, followed by Scott at 15 percent, Gowdy at 14 percent, and Sanford at 11 percent. Haley said that she would not appoint Colbert to the seat.

== Republican primary ==
=== Candidates ===
==== Declared ====
- Tim Scott, incumbent U.S. senator
- Randall Young

=== Results ===
Republican primary results
Party	Candidate	Votes	%
Republican	Tim Scott (incumbent)	276,147	89.98%
Republican	Randall Young	30,741	10.02%
Total votes		306,888	100.00%

== Democratic primary ==
=== Candidates ===
==== Declared ====
- Joyce Dickerson, Richland County councilwoman and former chair of the National Foundation for Women Legislators
- Sidney Moore, former York County councilman
- Harry Pavilack, attorney and candidate for South Carolina's 7th congressional district in 2012

==== Withdrew ====
- Rick Wade, former United States Department of Commerce official and nominee for Secretary of State of South Carolina in 2002

==== Declined ====
- Jim Hodges, former governor of South Carolina
- John L. Scott, Jr., state senator
- James E. Smith, Jr., state representative (running for re-election)
- Leon Stavrinakis, state representative (running for re-election)

=== Polling ===
Poll source	Date(s) administered	Sample size	Margin of error	Joyce Dickerson	Sidney Moore	Harry Pavilack	Undecided
Clemson University	May 26 – June 2, 2014	400	± 6%	11%	7%	3%	79%

=== Results ===
Democratic primary results
Party	Candidate	Votes	%
Democratic	Joyce Dickerson	72,874	65.39%
Democratic	Sidney Moore	26,310	23.61%
Democratic	Harry Pavilack	11,886	11.06%
Total votes		111,437	100.00%

== Independent and third parties ==
=== Declared ===
- Jill Bossi (American Party), vice president of the American Red Cross

=== Removed from ballot ===
- Brandon Armstrong (Independent), businesswoman

== General election ==
=== Debates ===
- Complete video of debate, October 28, 2014

=== Endorsements ===
Tim Scott

Individuals

- Sarah Palin, former governor of Alaska, Republican vice-presidential nominee in 2008

Organizations

- American Conservative Union
- FreedomWorks
- Government Is Not God PAC (GING-PAC)
- United States Chamber of Commerce
Joyce Dickerson

Organizations

- AFL-CIO
- International Brotherhood of Boilermakers, Iron Ship Builders, Blacksmiths, Forgers and Helpers
- United Automobile Workers
Jill Bossi

Individuals

- Brandon Armstrong, businesswoman and former Independent candidate for this seat

Organizations

- The Centrist Project

=== Predictions ===
Source	Ranking	As of
The Cook Political Report	Solid R	November 3, 2014
Sabato's Crystal Ball	Safe R	November 3, 2014
Rothenberg Political Report	Safe R	November 3, 2014
Real Clear Politics	Safe R	November 3, 2014

=== Polling ===
Poll source	Date(s) administered	Sample size	Margin of error	Tim Scott (R)	Joyce Dickerson (D)	Other	Undecided
Rasmussen Reports	July 9–10, 2014	750	± 4%	53%	31%	6%	11%
CBS News/NYT/YouGov	July 5–24, 2014	1,180	± 5.4%	52%	40%	2%	9%
CBS News/NYT/YouGov	August 18 – September 2, 2014	833	± 5%	54%	33%	0%	13%
Winthrop University	September 21–28, 2014	1,082	± 3%	52.4%	31.8%	1.9%	13.8%
CBS News/NYT/YouGov	September 20 – October 1, 2014	2,663	± 2%	54%	31%	0%	14%
CBS News/NYT/YouGov	October 16–23, 2014	1,566	± 4%	57%	28%	0%	15%

=== Results ===
United States Senate special election in South Carolina, 2014
Party	Candidate	Votes	%	±%
Republican	Tim Scott (incumbent)	757,215	61.12%	−0.36%
Democratic	Joyce Dickerson	459,583	37.09%	+9.44%
American	Jill Bossi	21,652	1.75%	N/A
Write-in		532	0.04%	-1.62%
Total votes		1,238,982	100.0%	N/A
Republican hold				

==== Counties that flipped from Republican to Democratic ====
- Calhoun (largest town: St. Matthews)
- Clarendon (largest city: Manning)
- Sumter (largest city: Sumter)
- Richland (largest city: Columbia)

== See also ==
- 2014 United States Senate election in South Carolina
- 2014 United States House of Representatives elections in South Carolina
- 2014 South Carolina gubernatorial election
- 2014 United States Senate elections
- 2014 United States elections
