= National Foundation for Women Legislators =

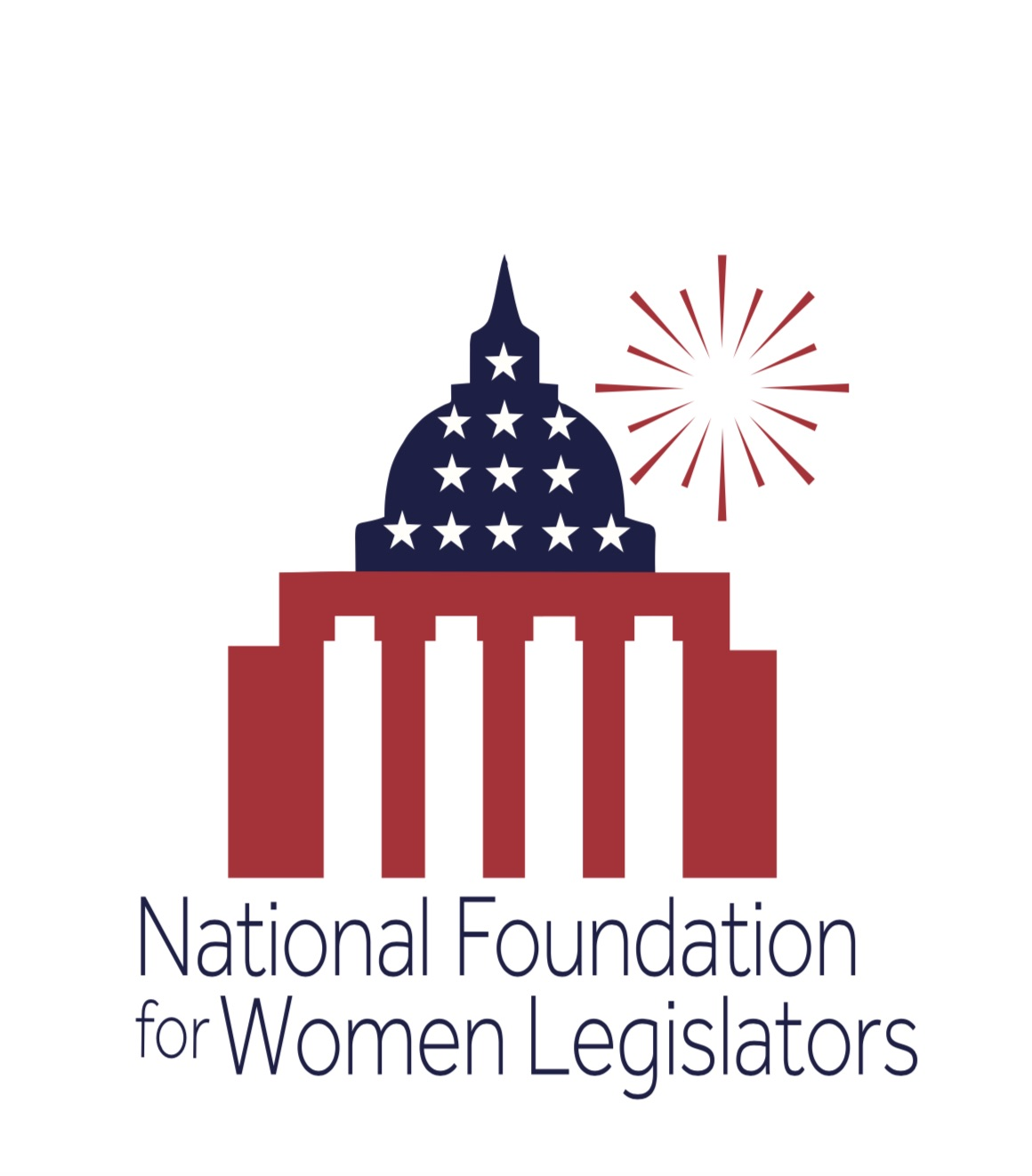
- Type: 501(c)(3) tax-exempt foundation
- Purpose: "to provide strategic resources to elected women for leadership development, exchange of diverse legislative ideas, and effective governance through conferences, state outreach, educational materials, professional and personal relationships, and networking."
- Headquarters: Alexandria, Virginia
- Region served: United States
- Official language: English
- Executive Director: Jody Thomas
- Parent organization: National Order of Women Legislators (NOWL)
- Website: http://www.womenlegislators.org

The National Order of Women Legislators (NOWL) (1938 – 2014) was an organization for women legislators in the United States. Emma Poeter's book about its history was published in 1981. Smith College has a collection of the group's records. It was founded in 1938 and was non-partisan. It used a small gold owl as an insignia. Its first meeting was attended by 31 legislators. Tea was served and the group was invited to the White House. In 2014, it reorganized as the National Foundation for Women Legislators (NFWL), a 501(c)(3) tax-exempt foundation established by the NOWL in the USA. Headquartered in Alexandria, Virginia, it assists women legislators with public opinion and legislative issues.

According to Lauren Kozakiewicz, the NOWL never reached the level of influence or solidarity desired by its members. Harvard University has a collection of speeches from the group's meeting in Baltimore, Maryland in 1968.

== Organization ==
Through annual educational and networking events, the NFWL supports elected women from all levels of governance. As a non-profit, non-partisan organization, NFWL does not take ideological positions on public policy issues, but rather serves as a forum for women legislators to be empowered through information and experience.

== Annual Conference ==
The NFWL Annual Conference is a national forum designed to encourage the building of alliances among elected women, industry leaders, and issue experts. The conference fosters a safe environment for sharing ideas, discussing current events, and learning about new initiatives and programs through plenary sessions, workshops, roundtables and policy committees. The goal of the annual conference is to intellectually equip elected women to mold public opinion and prepare for legislative debate. Presentations throughout the conference offer elected women new perspectives and innovative ideas that may inevitably lead to policy resolutions and legislation in their respective states. As a non-partisan organization, NFWL does not take ideological positions on any current issue, but rather exists to assist women leaders in the process of issue education, networking, re-elections, and leadership.

NFWL's Annual Conference is unique because a majority of the elected women who attend the conference are given scholarships to support their presence. As a result, NFWL garners high attendance rates at all conference events. This allows NFWL's supporters to have direct access to elected women from across the country in a variety of settings.
