= South Carolina Green Party =

- Co-chair: Brian Cooke
- Co-chair: vacant
- Founded: 2002
- Headquarters: Columbia, South Carolina 29250
- Ideology: Green politics
- Political position: Left-wing
- National affiliation: Natural Law Party (until 2002); Green Party (after 2002)
- Colors: Green
- Local offices: 2 (October 2020)

Website
- www.scgreenparty.org

The South Carolina Green Party is a ballot-qualified political party in the state of South Carolina. It is the state affiliate party of the Green Party of the United States.

== History ==
The party had been the South Carolina affiliate of the Natural Law Party but was taken over by the Green Party after the Natural Law Party officially disbanded its national organization in 2002. The party has been ballot qualified throughout its affiliation with the Green Party.

Since its founding, the party has regularly participated in elections for state, local and national office, making a significant impact on the 2010 senate election.

In 2020, Florence resident Angela Nicole Walker joined the Green Party to run as Howie Hawkins' running mate for President.

== Officeholders ==
- Eugene Platt, James Island Public Service District
- Michael Stewart, Greenville County Soil & Water District Commission

== Elections ==
=== 2010 ===
In May 2010, the party nominated Friends of the Earth regional coordinator Tom Clements to run for US Senate against incumbent Republican Jim DeMint and Democrat Alvin Greene.

Clements raised more than $50,000 by mid-October. Incumbent Jim DeMint reported more than $3 million raised to date. Democrat Alvin Greene reported no fundraising activities during the entire campaign. A Winthrop University poll conducted between October 5 and 10 with 741 likely South Carolina voters found Clements running second with 12.2% of the vote against 11.2% for Democrat Alvin Greene and 58.3% for incumbent Jim DeMint.

Clements campaigned around the state from June through November 1, appearing at NAACP forums, stump meetings, editorial conferences and other public events. The campaign financed TV and radio advertisements in the Columbia, Charleston and Pee Dee regions during the two weeks prior to the election.

Clements received 121,472 in the final tally, 9.22% of the total 1,318,794 votes cast. This is the best result for a candidate who was not a Democrat or Republican since Strom Thurmond won as a write-in candidate in 1954. Clements' result also exceeds the previous best result for a progressive statewide candidate: Ralph Nader received 20,297 votes for President from South Carolina in 2000.

Other notable results include the 1,186 votes earned by Eugene Platt running in SC House District 115. D.C. Swinton running in SC House District 24 as a Green/Democratic fusion candidate while a student at Winthrop University earned 3,390 votes or 25% of the total. Christopher Jones received 11.76% in a two-person race in SC House District 74. Leslie Minerd and Dorthea Bull each received around 2%. Gubernatorial candidate Morgan Reeves received 1.16%. Against local prosecutor Trey Gowdy and an array of right wing minor parties C. Faye Walter's vote in the 4th Congressional District was 1.18%. Robert Dobbs similarly earned about 1.16% running in the 1st Congressional district against six other candidates. Nammu Mohammed received about 1% of the vote against Democratic Congressional Whip Jim Clyburn of the 6th District.

== Presidential election results ==
| Year | Nominee | Votes |
|---|---|---|
| 1996 | Ralph Nader | Not on ballot |
| 2000 | Ralph Nader | 20,279 (1.47%) |
| 2004 | David Cobb | 1,488 (0.10%) |
| 2008 | Cynthia McKinney | 4,461 (0.23%) |
| 2012 | Jill Stein | 5,446 (0.28%) |
| 2016 | Jill Stein | 12,945 (0.62%) |
| 2020 | Howie Hawkins | 6,907 (0.27%) |
| 2024 | Jill Stein | 8,117 (0.32%) |

== See also ==
- List of State Green Parties
- Elections in South Carolina
- Government of South Carolina
- Politics of South Carolina
- Political party strength in South Carolina
  - South Carolina Libertarian Party
  - South Carolina Democratic Party
  - South Carolina Republican Party
