= Tom Clements (politician) =

American politician

Personal details
- Born: 1951 (age 74–75) Savannah, Georgia, U.S.
- Party: Green
- Education: Emory University, BA; master’s degree in Forest Resources, University of Georgia
- Occupation: Southeastern Nuclear Campaign Coordinator with Friends of the Earth
- Website: scgreenparty.org

Tom Clements (born 1951) is an American environmental activist and politician from South Carolina. Clements was the Green Party's nominee in the 2010 United States Senate election in South Carolina. Clements received more than 9% of the vote. He is the Southeastern Nuclear Campaign Coordinator for the US branch of Friends of the Earth in Columbia, South Carolina. Clements worked as the campaign manager for Democratic Congressman Doug Barnard, Jr. in the 1980s and as well as a long environmental activist with Greenpeace and the Nuclear Control Institute.

== Activism ==
Clements worked as a policy analyst in the United States Forest Service and as an inspector in the Office of Surface Mining for the U.S. Department of the Interior. Clements worked the executive director of the Nuclear Control Institute, a research and advocacy center for preventing nuclear proliferation and nuclear terrorism. He joined NCI in February 1999 and is responsible for the organization's day-to-day operations. Prior to joining NCI, Clements was a senior nuclear campaigner with Greenpeace. He is considered a nuclear and plutonium expert by The New York Times. He is also the Southeastern Nuclear Campaign Coordinator for the US branch of Friends of the Earth in Columbia, South Carolina. Friends of the Earth is the considered the public interest watchdog over the Department of Energy's Savannah River Site nuclear complex. In the 1970’s, Clements founded Athenians for Clean Energy in Athens, Georgia. ACE was an early environmental movement working to eliminate toxic waste disposal and coal burning by the University of Georgia. Their focus was to educate the Athens, Georgia community about emerging environmental issues.

== 2010 Senatorial campaign ==
Clements, who had no previous experience with the Green Party, was approached by party leadership in January 2010 and asked to run for the United States Senate later that year. He won the Green Party's nomination for Senate in May and by June had raised 15,000 dollars towards his Senate campaign. Though not included in the Rasmussen poll data released in that same month, he claimed that the 9% of those polled supporting "other" was for his campaign. He ran against incumbent Republican Jim DeMint and military veteran and Democrat Alvin Greene as well as several write-in candidates.

Clements raised more than $45,000 by mid-October. Incumbent Jim DeMint reported more than $3 million raised to date. Democrat Alvin Greene reported no fundraising activities. Clements campaigned around the state from June through November 1, appearing at NAACP forums, stump meetings, editorial conferences and other public events. The campaign financed TV and radio advertisements to run in the Columbia, Charleston and Pee Dee regions during the two weeks prior to the election.

A Winthrop University poll conducted between October 5 and 10 with 741 likely South Carolina voters found Clements running second with 12.2% of the vote against 11.2% for Democrat Alvin Greene and 58.3% for incumbent Jim DeMint.

=== Political positions ===
Clements opposed the continuing practice of dumping nuclear waste in South Carolina. He opposed offshore drilling, with his website calling it "a potentially disastrous gamble that could destroy South Carolina’s coastline, along with her fishing and tourism industries". Clements supported the new START Treaty with Russia. His campaign also focused on conservation and job creation.

=== Senate candidacy endorsements ===
On July 6, 2010, the Greater Columbia Central Labor Council of the SC AFL-CIO gave Clements their endorsement. On September 9, The Nation's John Nichols suggested that Democrats embrace Clements as the most progressive choice and best option in the South Carolina Senate election over Greene and DeMint.

Clements for Senate was formally endorsed by the national Sierra Club, Friends of the Earth Action, and by the South Carolina Latino Political Action Committee.

In a first for a minor party candidate in South Carolina, Clements was endorsed for Senate by a daily paper, the Rock Hill Herald.

=== Campaign result ===
Clements received 121,472 in the final tally, 9.22% of the total 1,318,794 votes cast. This was the best result for a candidate in South Carolina who was not a Democrat or Republican nominee since Strom Thurmond won as a write-in candidate in 1954. Clements' result also exceeds the previous best result for a Green Party statewide candidate; Ralph Nader received 20,297 votes for President from South Carolina in 2000.

== Personal and education ==
Clements was born in 1951 in Savannah, Georgia. He is an eighth generation Georgian. He served in the Peace Corps in Costa Rica and is fluent in Spanish. Clements has an MA degree in Forest Resources from the University of Georgia and a BA from Emory University.

== See also ==
- Anti-nuclear movement in the United States
- Friends of the Earth
- United States Senate election in South Carolina, 2010

Party political offices
Preceded by Efia Nwangaza	Green nominee for U.S. Senator from South Carolina (Class 1); 2010	Most recent
