= 2004 United States Senate election in South Carolina =

- November 2, 2004
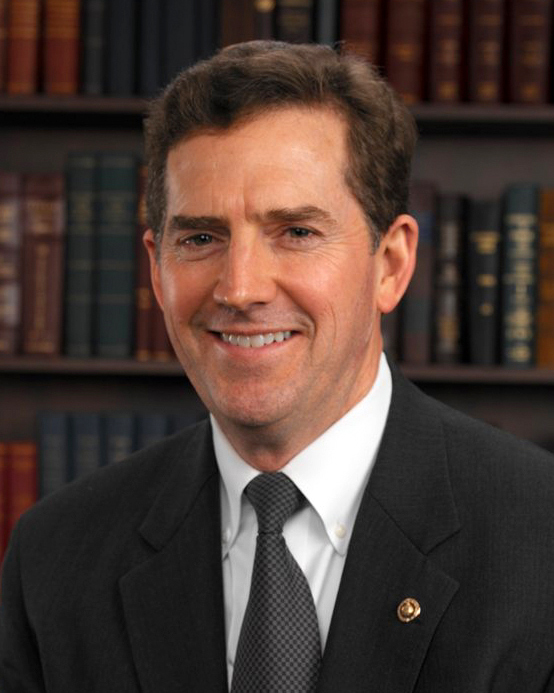

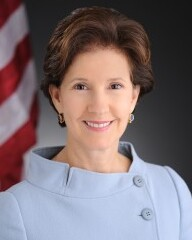
Nominee	Jim DeMint	Inez Tenenbaum
Party	Republican	Democratic
Popular vote	857,167	704,384
Percentage	53.67%	44.10%
- County results DeMint: 40–50% 50–60% 60–70% Tenenbaum: 40–50% 50–60% 60–70% 70–80%
U.S. senator before election
Fritz Hollings
Democratic
Elected U.S. Senator
Jim DeMint
Republican

The 2004 United States Senate election in South Carolina was held on November 2, 2004. Longtime incumbent Democratic U.S. Senator Fritz Hollings retired, and Republican U.S. Representative Jim DeMint won the open seat. DeMint was the first Republican to hold this Senate seat since 1879 and the first Republican ever to be popularly elected to this seat. Since DeMint took office in 2005, Republicans held both of South Carolina’s Senate seats, which they had not done since Reconstruction, until 2026.

== Democratic primary ==
South Carolina's status as a Republican stronghold led observers to speculate that Hollings retiring would lead to his seat being picked up by a Republican. Inez Tenenbaum, the South Carolina superintendent of education, would win the primary by a wide margin following the decision of many state Democrats to forgo a candidacy.

=== Candidates ===
==== Nominee ====
- Inez Tenenbaum, South Carolina superintendent of education

==== Eliminated in primary ====
- Ben Frasier, former congressional aide

==== Withdrew ====
- Bob Coble, mayor of Columbia (endorsed Tenenbaum)

==== Declined to run ====
- Jim Clyburn, U.S. representative
- Hayne Hipp, businessman
- Fritz Hollings, incumbent U.S. senator (retired)
- Darla Moore, investor
- Thomas L. Moore, state senator
- Alex Sanders, former president of the College of Charleston; nominee for U.S. Senate in 2002
- James E. Smith Jr., state representative
- John Spratt, U.S. representative

=== Results ===
2004 South Carolina U.S. Senate Democratic primary election
Party	Candidate	Votes	%
Democratic	Inez Tenenbaum	126,720	75.5%
Democratic	Ben Frasier	41,070	24.5%

== Republican primary ==
=== Candidates ===
==== Nominee ====
- Jim DeMint, U.S. representative

==== Defeated in primary ====
- David Beasley, former governor
- Charlie Condon, state attorney general
- Orly Benny Davis, businesswoman
- Mark Struthers McBride, mayor of Myrtle Beach
- Thomas Ravenel, real estate executive and son of former U.S. Representative Arthur Ravenel Jr.

=== Campaign ===
The Senate election two years earlier in 2002 did not have a primary election because the South Carolina Republicans were more preoccupied with the gubernatorial contest, despite having the first open senate seat in 40 years. The retirement of Democratic Senator Fritz Hollings gave the Republicans an opportunity to pick up the seat, and with no other interesting positions up for election in 2004, a crowded field developed in the Republican primary. Furthermore, the Republicans were motivated by having President Bush at the top of the ticket, enabling them to ride his coattails to victory.

Former Governor David Beasley, from the Pee Dee, entered the race and quickly emerged as the frontrunner because of his support from the evangelical voters. However, during his term as governor from 1995 to 1999, he had greatly angered the electorate by proposing to remove the Confederate Naval Jack from the dome of the statehouse, and by being against the adoption of a state lottery to provide for college scholarships. Both positions led to the loss of his re-election in 1998, and the issues continued to trouble him in the Senate race.

The battle for second place in the primary was between Upstate Congressman, Jim DeMint and Charleston developer Thomas Ravenel. DeMint was able to squeak out a second-place finish because Charlie Condon, a former attorney general of South Carolina, split the Lowcountry vote, with Ravenel thus providing DeMint the margin he needed. In addition, while many voters were attracted to the Ravenel campaign and felt that he had a future in politics, they believed that he should set his sights on a less high-profile office first before trying to become senator. Resigned to defeat, Ravenel endorsed DeMint in the runoff election.

In the runoff election on June 22, 2004, DeMint scored a surprising victory over Beasley. Ravenel's endorsement of DeMint proved crucial, as the Lowcountry counties heavily went for the representative from the Upstate. Also, Beasley had burned too many bridges while governor, and was unable to increase his share of the vote in the runoff.

=== Polling ===
Poll source	Date(s) administered	Sample size	Margin of error	Jim DeMint	David Beasley	Thomas Ravenel	Charlie Condon	Mark McBride	Bob Peeler	Undecided
SurveyUSA	June 18–20, 2004	499 (LV)	± 4.5%	54%	44%					2%
Public Opinion Strategies (R)	June 10–14, 2004	700 (LV)		46%	42%					12%
SurveyUSA	June 12–14, 2004	527 (LV)	± 4.4%	47%	48%					5%
Public Opinion Strategies (R)	June 7, 2004			42%	48%					10%
Richard Quinn & Associates (R)	June 9–10, 2004	300 (LV)	± 5.8%	38%	47%					15%
SurveyUSA	June 4–6, 2004	500 (LV)	± 4.5%	20%	38%	23%	12%			7%
SurveyUSA	May 22–24, 2004	421 (LV)	± 4.9%	21%	43%	17%	16%			3%
Richard Quinn & Associates (R)	May 11, 2004	467 (LV)	± 4.7%	18%	40%	11%	9%			22%
Public Opinion Strategies (R)	May 2004			33%	54%					10%
SurveyUSA	April 26–28, 2004	427 (LV)	± 4.9%	27%	38%		19%			16%
Richard Quinn & Associates (R)	February 4–5, 2004	716 (LV)	± 3.8%	13%	41%	9%	15%	2%		20%
Public Opinion Strategies (R)	January 2004	550 (LV)	± 3.4%	16%	37%	10%	19%	2%		16%
Richard Quinn & Associates (R)	October 17–20, 2003		± 3.8%	8%	24%		8%		16%	44%
Richard Quinn & Associates (R)	October 17–20, 2003		± 3.8%	24%	44%					32%
Richard Quinn & Associates (R)	October 17–20, 2003		± 3.8%	22%			33%			45%
Richard Quinn & Associates (R)	October 17–20, 2003		± 3.8%		44%		28%			28%
Basswood Research (R)	April 29, 2003	500 (LV)	± 4.4%	19%		4%	27%	4%		46%

=== Results ===
Republican primary
Candidate	Votes	%
David Beasley	107,847	36.6%
Jim DeMint	77,567	26.3%
Thomas Ravenel	73,167	24.8%
Charlie Condon	27,694	9.4%
Mark McBride	6,479	2.2%
Orly Benny Davis	1,915	0.7%

Republican primary runoff
Candidate	Votes	%	±%
Jim DeMint	154,644	59.2%	+32.9%
David Beasley	106,480	40.8%	+4.2%

== General election ==
=== Candidates ===
==== Major ====
- Jim DeMint (R), U.S. representative
- Inez Tenenbaum (D), South Carolina superintendent of education

==== Minor ====
- Tee Ferguson (United Citizens)
- Efia Nwangaza (Green)
- Rebekah E. Sutherland (Libertarian)
- Patrick Tyndall (Constitution)

DeMint entered the general election campaign severely weakened from the primary fight, having spent most of his campaign funds. He stressed to the voters that he would follow conservative principles and provide an important Republican vote in the closely divided Senate. Democrats fared poorly in statewide elections in South Carolina, so Tenenbaum tried to make the race about issues rather than party identification.

Tenenbaum attacked DeMint's support of the FairTax proposal because it would increase the sales tax by 23%. The election victory by DeMint merely cemented South Carolina's shift to the Republican column, as the best candidate the Democrats could offer was soundly defeated by the typical 10-point margin.

=== Predictions ===
Source	Ranking	As of
Sabato's Crystal Ball	Likely R (flip)	November 1, 2004

=== Polling ===
Poll source	Date(s) administered	Sample size	Margin of error	Jim DeMint (R)	Inez Tenenbaum (D)	Undecided
SurveyUSA	October 29–31, 2004	635 (LV)	± 4%	52%	41%	7%
McLaughlin & Associates	October 26–28, 2004	400 (LV)	± 4.9%	48%	40%	12%
SurveyUSA	October 22–24, 2004	564 (LV)	± 4.2%	52%	39%	9%
Mason-Dixon	October 19–20, 2004	625 (LV)	± 4%	47%	43%	10%
SurveyUSA	October 10–12, 2004	563 (LV)	± 4.2%	46%	43%	11%
Rasmussen Reports	October 6, 2004	500 (LV)	± 4.5%	49%	43%	8%
McLaughlin & Associates (R)	September 29–30, 2004	400 (LV)	± 4.9%	46%	36%	18%
Mason-Dixon	September 27–29, 2004	625 (RV)	± 4%	50%	38%	12%
Global Strategy Group (D)	September 27–29, 2004	500 (LV)	± 4.4%	43%	46%	11%
SurveyUSA	September 19–21, 2004	684 (LV)	± 3.8%	51%	39%	10%
Global Strategy Group (D)	September 7–9, 2004	600 (LV)	± 4%	44%	41%	15%
SurveyUSA	August 16–18, 2004	727 (LV)	± 3.7%	52%	39%	9%
SurveyUSA	July 10–12, 2004	702 (LV)	± 3.8%	48%	41%	11%
Public Opinion Strategies (R)	June 28–29, 2004	600 (LV)	± 4%	47%	41%	12%
Hickman Research (D)	March 14–18, 2004	700 (LV)	± 3.7%	33%	48%	19%
Hickman Research (D)	Jul 28–Aug 3, 2003	628 (LV)	± 3.9%	33%	48%	19%
DSCC (D)	May 2003		± %	33%	45%	22%

Hypothetical polling

Poll source	Date(s) administered	Sample size	Margin of error	David Beasley (R)	Inez Tenenbaum (D)	Undecided
Hickman Research (D)	March 14–18, 2004	700 (LV)	± 3.7%	41%	46%	13%
McLaughlin & Associates (R)	February 2004	500 (LV)	± 4.5%	48%	32%	20%

Poll source	Date(s) administered	Sample size	Margin of error	Charlie Condon (R)	Inez Tenenbaum (D)	Undecided
Hickman Research (D)	March 14–18, 2004	700 (LV)	± 3.7%	40%	47%	13%
Hickman Research (D)	Jul 28–Aug 3, 2003	628 (LV)	± 3.9%	36%	48%	16%

Poll source	Date(s) administered	Sample size	Margin of error	Thomas Ravenel (R)	Inez Tenenbaum (D)	Undecided
Hickman Research (D)	Jul 28–Aug 3, 2003	628 (LV)	± 3.9%	29%	49%	22%

Poll source	Date(s) administered	Sample size	Margin of error	Jim DeMint (R)	Fritz Hollings (D)	Undecided
DSCC (D)	May 2003		± %	38%	43%	19%

=== Results ===
South Carolina U.S. Senate election, 2004
Party	Candidate	Votes	%	±%
Republican	Jim DeMint•	857,167	53.67%	+8.00%
Democratic	Inez Tenenbaum	704,384	44.10%	−8.60%
Constitution	Patrick Tyndall	13,464	0.84%	N/A
Libertarian	Rebekah E. Sutherland	10,678	0.67%	−0.92%
United Citizens	Tee Ferguson	5,859	0.37%	N/A
Green	Efia Nwangaza*	4,245	0.27%	N/A
No party	Write-Ins	1,286	0.08%	N/A
Majority		152,783	9.57%	+2.54%
Turnout		1,597,221	69.0%	+16.2%
Republican gain from Democratic				
*Nwangaza ran under the Independence Party in Aiken and Calhoun counties; her totals are combined.

==== Counties that flipped from Democratic to Republican ====
- Abbeville (largest city: Abbeville)
- Georgetown (largest city: Murrells Inlet)
- Lancaster (largest city: Lancaster)
- Union (largest city: Union)
- Barnwell (largest city: Barnwell)
- Berkeley (largest city: Goose Creek)
- Cherokee (largest city: Gaffney)
- Dorchester (largest city: North Charleston)
- Edgefield (largest city: Edgefield)
- Florence (largest city: Florence)
- Greenwood (largest city: Greenwood)
- Kershaw (largest city: Cmaden)
- Laurens (largest city: Laurens)
- Newberry (largest city: Newberry)
- Saluda (largest city: Saluda)

== See also ==
- 2004 United States Senate elections
- List of United States senators from South Carolina
