= Porter-Gaud School =

Prep school in Charleston, South Carolina, US

Location
- 300 Albemarle Rd; Charleston, South Carolina 29407; United States

Information
- Type: Private, day, college preparatory
- Motto: Fides, Honor, Scientia (Faith, Honor, Knowledge)
- Religious affiliation: Episcopal Church
- Founded: 1867
- Headmaster: DuBose Egleston
- Faculty: 120
- Grades: K2–12
- Gender: Co-educational
- Enrollment: 1,050
- Student to teacher ratio: 12:1
- Campus: 88 acres (360,000 m^{2})
- Colors: Garnet and gray
- Athletics conference: SCISA - 4A
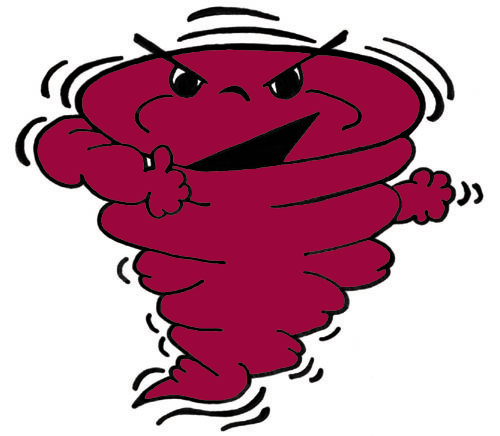
- Nickname: Cyclones
- Rival: Bishop England High School
- Yearbook: Polygon
- Endowment: $25.6m
- Tuition: Lower school: $29,000; Middle/Upper school: $34,730
- Website: www.portergaud.edu

The Porter-Gaud School is an independent coeducational college preparatory day school in Charleston, in the U.S. state of South Carolina. Porter-Gaud has an enrollment of some 1,578 students, comprising a lower school, middle school, and high school, and is located on the banks of the Ashley River. The school has historic ties to the Episcopal Church.

Porter-Gaud was formed in July 1964 from the merger of three schools: the Porter Military Academy (founded 1867), the Gaud School for Boys (founded 1908), and the Watt School (founded 1931). The legal name of the institution remains The Porter Academy.

The Porter Military Academy was formed in 1867 by the Rev. Anthony Toomer Porter, an Episcopal priest, to educate boys orphaned during the Civil War. Established on the scholastic philosophy of William Augustus Muhlenberg (1796–1877) as the Holy Communion Church Institute in 1867, the school was later known as Porter Academy and eventually Porter Military Academy. Porter hired John Gadsden as the academic principal. Gadsden was prepared in Muhlenberg's famous school on Long Island and brought his successful principles to the new school in his hometown of Charleston.

William Steen Gaud established the Gaud School in 1908. In 1948, Berkeley Grimball purchased the school from Gaud and over the course of 16 years increased the enrollment to nearly 150 as the Gaud School attained a position of eminence among Southern preparatory schools. Ann Carson Elliott, Berkeley Grimball's mother, founded the Watt School in 1931, a coeducational primary school, which served as a feeder school for the Gaud School.

In 1964, the original Porter Military Academy campus in downtown Charleston was sold to the Medical University of South Carolina, and the Atlantic Coast Line Railroad (now CSX) donated the current 88-acre (360,000 m^{2}) campus on Albemarle Point. In July 1964, the three schools merged and dropped the military program. The new entity, Porter-Gaud School, opened its doors to 435 male students in grades 1–12. As modern school facilities began taking shape across the Ashley River on the property donated by the railroad, classes met at the old Porter campus.

Porter-Gaud opened its new campus in September 1965 with an enrollment of 469 day students. In the following year it became one of the first schools in the South to adopt an open admissions policy. In 1972, the school admitted female students into the first three grades. By the fall of 1975 the program had been accelerated to include girls at all levels of the school, although Porter-Gaud has retained close ties to its sister school, Ashley Hall.

In May 2008, Porter-Gaud acquired The O'Quinn Schools, a local preschool that dates back to the early 1970s, with the intention of maintaining the names of the schools, faculties, programs, and tuition policies.

Porter-Gaud School graduates an average class size of 100 per year.

Porter-Gaud School is a member of the South Carolina Independent School Association, and Porter-Gaud offers over 38 varsity and junior varsity sports. The school athletic nickname is the Cyclone.

== Porter Military Academy ==
On October 25, 1867, while in Magnolia Cemetery, mourning the death of one of his sons, Anthony Toomer Porter, rector of Holy Communion Church, became convinced that he should start a school. Many of his son's friends could no longer attend school, as their families had been impoverished by the war. By December of that year, Porter had founded the Holy Communion Church Institute, using church facilities.

In 1879 the old Federal Arsenal on Ashley Avenue, a block from the church, was put up for sale. Porter went to Washington and secured the help of President Hayes and Gen. Sherman (Porter had saved the life of an Officer in Sherman's army during the war) to convince Congress to lease the property to the school for $1.00 a year.

Adapting the military buildings to school use, it was fitting that the school became known as Porter Military Academy. Both boarding school and day school, students came from towns and farms throughout the Low Country, and eventually from upper South Carolina, other states, and even other countries. From its beginning, the school accepted students from all faiths. It was and is affiliated with the Episcopal Church, but is owned by its Board of Trustees, with the Bishop as an ex officio member. One of the primary goals of the school was, and is, character development, summarized in the motto on the PMA crest: WATCH: Words, Actions, Thoughts, Character, and Habits.

Porter developed a broad curriculum, ranging from Greek to woodworking to athletics. The school day began with bugle call, breakfast, and chapel. Facilities ranged from a dormitory, an infirmary, library, classroom buildings, rifle range, tennis courts, a parade ground, and the notorious "bull ring" where detention students were made to march. Porter Military Academy boasted a naval program, including several surplus Navy vessels. The "Porter Navy" was discontinued, however, after a fire destroyed the ships. Porter also claimed one of the first high school football teams, one of which in a 1913 scrimmage held the Citadel to a 0 to 0 score.

== The Gaud School for Boys ==
Gaud, born in Canada, had a master's degree from the University of Chicago, and had been headmaster of Lawrence Academy in Groton, Massachusetts. After marrying a Charleston woman, he founded the Gaud School in 1908 with 34 students. In 1912 he turned the school over to others in order to teach at Phillips Exeter and then to serve during World War I. He returned to Charleston in 1919 and again took over his school.

The school was first located in a building behind his home at 29 Legare Street, but in 1920 it relocated to 77 Church Street. From 1928 until 1941 and again from 1957 to 1961, the school was located at 90–92 East Bay Street on the corner of Adger's Wharf. In 1949-50 there were some 20-25 students in three grades in a 1-room school on East Bay Street. The school was also located for a time at 77 Church Street and at 79–81 East Bay Street.

Upon Gaud's return to Charleston in 1919, his school essentially became a place to prepare Charleston boys for successful entry into New England boarding schools. Its high academic standards meant that Gaud often had a waiting list of applicants. The number of his students ranged from ten to eighteen, and these were divided into two grade levels in his one schoolroom, one class studying while the other recited. After Watt's school began in 1931, it was customary for boys to attend her school through the third grade, and then fit into Gaud's school, which went through the eighth grade. Gaud let his students take a break in the school day and go to the nearby playground, where one of the games was called "Gaud ball" – rather like baseball without a bat.

In 1948 Gaud retired at age 82 and his equity in the school was purchased by Berkeley Grimball for $125.00. Grimball began to build his school, a grade at a time, until he had about 180 students. The building on East Bay Street became too small for the growing school. In 1961 Grimball bought the Rutledge mansion on Broad Street, where the students had classes until 1964. Grimball continued Gaud's high academic standards, at first teaching many of the subjects himself. As the school grew, he added teachers such as Maurice McLaughlin, who taught Latin and Spanish; history teacher Rear Admiral (Ret.) R. Bentham Simmons, a survivor of the attack on Pearl Harbor; French teacher Charles Winter, a refugee from Hungary; and Admiral Florence, who taught math. Grimball was a particularly fine teacher of literature and history. The school lacked athletic facilities, but Grimball at first used the East Bay Street playground, especially for touch football and for softball, at recess and for voluntary extra sports on Monday and Thursday afternoons, and later took boys out to practice on his tennis courts on James Island; soccer was also added to the activities.

== The Watt School ==
Mrs. Watt was Grimball's mother, so running a school came naturally for him. After her husband died, she began her school in 1931 in the depth of the Great Depression. Her first classes were held in the dining room of her Broad Street home, but she had a small classroom building constructed at the rear of her property. The reputation of her school grew among her neighbors and among those living south of Broad Street. Many of her graduates went on to the Gaud School, particularly after Grimball became headmaster there. Most of the children walked to school and then walked home for the traditional 2:00 p.m. dinner. It was a homey and welcoming school and very "Charlestonian."

== The O'Quinn Schools ==
Founded in the early 1970s by Linda O'Quinn and her daughter Anna, the pre-school quickly became known for its personality and southern charm. The school quickly rose to prominence as the regions major feeder for many private schools and expanded to a second campus. Today the O'Quinn School is an important part of Porter-Gaud, maintaining two campuses on James Island and in Mt. Pleasant.

== Sexual misconduct scandal ==
From 1972 to the early 1980s, physical science teacher and athletic advisor Eddie Fischer sexually abused at least twenty students at Porter-Gaud and nineteen at other Charleston, SC schools. In 1982, in response to complaints about Fischer's sexual behavior, the administration of Porter-Gaud asked Fischer to resign. Both Principal James Bishop Alexander and Headmaster Berkeley Grimball then helped Fischer to get a job at another private school, where he continued to abuse. In April 1999, Fischer was sentenced to twenty years in prison for thirteen sexual-abuse charges. Porter-Gaud school did make a public apology but not to the victims themselves.

== Notable alumni ==
- John Buse – Professor of Medicine at the University of North Carolina School of Medicine, former President of the American Diabetes Association
- Octavus Roy Cohen (1891–1959) – writer
- Stephen Colbert – comedian, host of The Late Show
- Joel Derfner – author, musical theater composer
- Shepard Fairey – artist
- Jack Hitt – writer and contributing editor for This American Life, Harper's and The New York Times Magazine; previously wrote for Rolling Stone and Wired
- Benjamin Hutto - Director of Choral Activities and Director of Performing Arts at St. Albans School for Boys and the National Cathedral School for Girls in Washington D.C., organist for St. John's Episcopal Church - "the Nation's Church"
- Josiah-Jordan James (born 2000) – basketball player in the Australian National Basketball League
- George P. Kent - diplomat, Deputy Assistant Secretary of State for European and Eurasian Affairs, US Ambassador to Estonia
- Sallie Krawcheck – former CFO of Citigroup Inc.; former CEO of Smith Barney; member of the board of directors at Dell Computers, Head of Bank of America's Global Wealth Management division
- George Swinton Legaré – member of the United States House of Representatives, Charleston lawyer
- Burnet R. Maybank – Depression-era mayor of Charleston, Governor of South Carolina and United States Senator
- Khris Middleton (born 1991) – NBA championship winner for the Milwaukee Bucks, formerly of the Detroit Pistons; 3× NBA All-Star; Olympic gold medalist
- Ovie Mughelli (born 1980) – NFL football player
- Aaron Nesmith (born 1999) – NBA basketball player for the Indiana Pacers
- Vic Rawl – Democratic candidate for U.S. Senate; received national attention after losing to Alvin Greene
- Archibald Rutledge – South Carolina poet laureate
- Sonny Seiler – attorney, owner of Uga, the University of Georgia bulldog mascot
- Charles P. Summerall – United States Army general, Army Chief of Staff
- Kurt W. Tidd – United States Navy Admiral Commander U.S. Southern Command

== Notable faculty ==
This section does not cite any sources. Please help improve this section by adding citations to reliable sources. Unsourced material may be challenged and removed. (December 2021)(Learn how and when to remove this message)

- Hervey Allen – author from Pennsylvania; works include: Anthony Adverse, Israfel, Action at Aquila, and The Forest and the Fort
- DuBose Heyward – author best known for his 1924 novel Porgy; co-author of the non-musical play adapted from the novel, which became the foundation of George Gershwin's opera Porgy and Bess
- Benjamin Hutto – music director and choirmaster at the school during the 70s through the 90s, during which time the Porter-Gaud Choir recorded several albums
- Wyndham Meredith Manning – member of the South Carolina House of Representatives

== Heads of School ==
Porter Military Academy(1867–1964)	The Gaud School(1908–1964)	The Watt School(1931–1964)	Porter-Gaud School
Dr. Rev. Anthony Toomer Porter (1867-1902); Charles Jones Colcock (1902-1919); Rev. Walter Mitchell (1919-1922); Col. Paul M. Thrasher, USA, Ret. (1922-1953); Cmdr. Warren L. Willis, USN, Ret. (1954-1963); Maj. Ted Richardson (interim 1963-1964)	William Steen Gaud; Berkeley Grimball	Ann Carson Elliott (Mrs. Watt)	Berkeley Grimball (1964-1988); Gordon Bondurant (1988-1999); Stephen Blanchard (1999-2005); Liza Lee (interim 2005–2007); Dr. Christian J. Proctor (2007-2009); DuBose Egleston (interim 2009, 2010–present)

== See also ==
- Charleston Arsenal, the original site of Porter Military Academy
