= 2010 United States Senate election in South Carolina =

- November 2, 2010
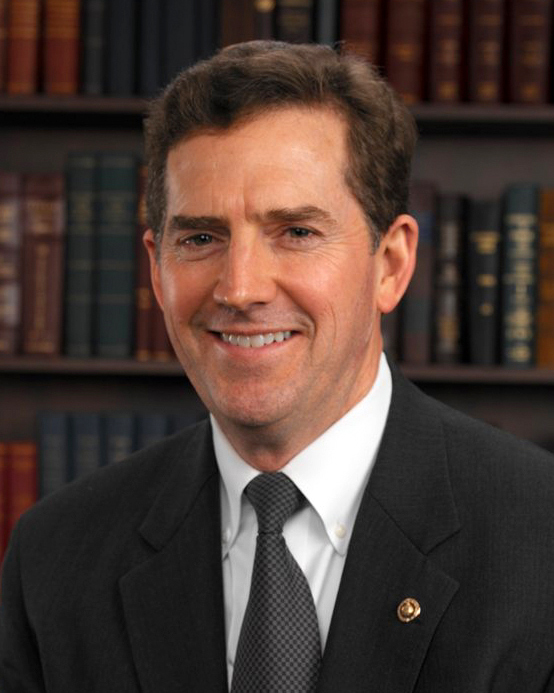

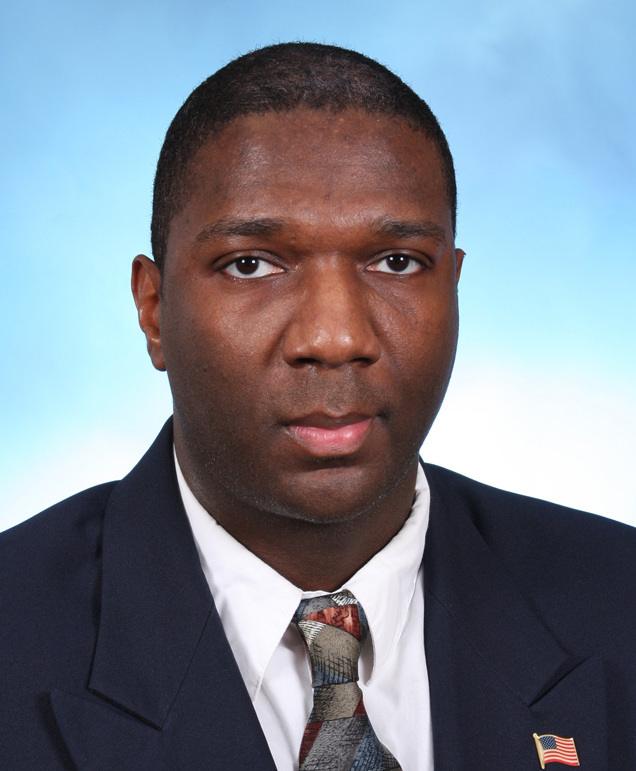

Nominee	Jim DeMint	Alvin Greene	Tom Clements
Party	Republican	Democratic	Green
Popular vote	810,771	364,598	121,472
Percentage	61.48%	27.65%	9.21%
- DeMint: 30–40% 40–50% 50–60% 60–70% 70–80% 80–90% >90% Greene: 30–40% 40–50% 50–60% 60–70% 70–80% 80–90% >90%
U.S. senator before election
Jim DeMint
Republican
Elected U.S. Senator
Jim DeMint
Republican

The 2010 United States Senate election in South Carolina was held on November 2, 2010. Incumbent Republican U.S. Senator Jim DeMint won re-election to a second term, defeating Democratic nominee Alvin Greene.

== Democratic primary ==
On June 8, 2010, Alvin Greene won the South Carolina Democratic primary for U.S. Senate, receiving 100,362 (59%) votes out of 170,215 votes cast; 69,853 (41%) went to Vic Rawl. Greene's victory over Rawl, a Charleston County councilmember and former state legislator, was described as an upset.

=== Candidates ===
- Alvin Greene, U.S. Army veteran
- Vic Rawl, Charleston County Council member and former state legislator

=== Results ===
Democratic primary results by county: Greene: 50–60%; 60–70%; 70–80%; Rawl: 50–60%

Democratic primary results
Party	Candidate	Votes	%
Democratic	Alvin Greene	100,362	59.0%
Democratic	Vic Rawl	69,853	41.0%
Total votes		170,215	100.0%

== Republican primary ==
=== Candidates ===
- Jim DeMint, incumbent U.S. senator
- Susan McDonald Gaddy

=== Results ===
Republican primary results
Party	Candidate	Votes	%
Republican	Jim DeMint (incumbent)	342,464	83.0%
Republican	Susan McDonald Gaddy	70,194	17.0%
Total votes		412,658	100.0%

== General election ==
=== Candidates ===
- Jim DeMint (Republican), incumbent U.S. senator
- Alvin Greene (Democratic), U.S. Army veteran
- Tom Clements (Green), environmental activist and Southeast director, Friends of the Earth

=== Campaign ===
Controversies surrounded the Democratic nominee, Alvin Greene. At the time of his Senate campaign, Greene was unemployed and living with and caring for his father in Manning, South Carolina. Greene's primary election win and his margin of victory surprised pundits. As of the primary, he had held no public campaign events, raised no money, and did not have a campaign website.

U.S. Congressman Jim Clyburn recommended Greene drop out of the race or face a federal investigation into his candidacy, even as Greene faced a felony obscenity charge in Richland County from November 2009. Clyburn said, "There were some real shenanigans going on in the South Carolina primary. I don't know if he was a Republican plant; he was someone's plant." Political blog FiveThirtyEight's Tom Schaller suggested three possibilities: a legitimate vote, the vote was rigged, or the vote-counting software was corrupted. Schaller ruled out the possibility of Republican infiltration, similar to Rush Limbaugh's "Operation Chaos" in 2008.

In response to an official protest filed by Vic Rawl, who was defeated by Greene in the Democratic primary, the executive committee of the South Carolina Democratic Party conducted a formal hearing on June 17, 2010, to assess the legitimacy of the primary election results. Greene neither attended nor sent a representative to the hearing. The executive committee of the South Carolina Democratic Party voted 55 to 10 to reject Rawl's request for a new Senate primary, finding insufficient evidence of impropriety to disturb the primary election result.

At multiple points during the campaign, the South Carolina Democratic Party called for Greene to withdraw his candidacy. In August 2010, South Carolina Democratic Party chairwoman Carol Fowler asserted that the criminal charges against Greene would make it impossible for him to run a statewide campaign.

Green Party challenger Tom Clements won the endorsement of the Greater Columbia Central Labor Council of the South Carolina AFL-CIO, a coalition of labor unions. The Clements campaign received regional media coverage. A Winthrop University poll conducted between October 5 and 10, 741 likely South Carolina voters found Clements running second with 12.2% of the vote against 11.2% for Greene and 58.3% for incumbent Republican Sen. Jim DeMint. An October 13 article in the Columbia Free Times noted that prominent Democrats were privately donating money to the Clements campaign. According to the FEC, as of September 30, Clements for Senate had raised $34,334. DeMint had raised in excess of $3 million, while Greene reported no fundraising activities.

Write-in candidates also joined the race, including the Reverend Mazie Ferguson, Mauldin High School teacher Greg Snoad, Michael C Neumann, and chef Nathalie Dupree. Mazie Ferguson was endorsed by House Majority Whip Jim Clyburn in late August; Clyburn said he would not vote for Greene due to his felony indictment.

Greene has been described as an enigmatic figure in American politics. He is known for his "strange, well-documented behavior on the campaign trail". A study by the Pew Research Center released in late July 2010 found that Greene's campaign had received the most media attention of all of the 2010 political campaigns.

The Republican candidate, incumbent Senator Jim DeMint, largely campaigned outside South Carolina for Republican Senate candidates identified with the Tea Party. Diverse media outlets frequently referred to DeMint as a party "kingmaker" for supporting successful primary challengers to mainstream Republican candidates.

At an October 3 appearance before a rally at Spartanburg North Baptist Church, DeMint reminded the audience of his 2004 comments that gay men and sexually active single women should be prohibited from teaching in public schools. The Spartanburg Herald-Journal reported:

DeMint said if someone is openly homosexual, they shouldn't be teaching in the classroom and he holds the same position on an unmarried woman who's sleeping with her boyfriend — she shouldn't be in the classroom. "(When I said those things,) no one came to my defense," he said. "But everyone would come to me and whisper that I shouldn't back down. They don't want government purging their rights and their freedom to religion."

The remarks attracted national media attention, largely critical. DeMint defended the statements, saying that local school boards should decide the issue. Challenger Tom Clements condemned DeMint's stance in a subsequent interview with the Herald-Journal:

"He's trying to push his version of religion onto the entire country. And I believe in separation of church and state. And I do believe that gay people should have equal rights," Clements said. "That's his belief, but I don't think he can force that on society as a whole or the public school system."

=== Endorsements ===
==== Organization endorsements ====
Tom Clements:

- Columbia Central Labor Council (AFL-CIO)
- Friends of the Earth Action
- Sierra Club
- South Carolina Latino Political Action Committee

Jim DeMint

- Americans For Legal Immigration
- Citizens for a Sound Economy
- National Rifle Association Political Victory Fund

==== Newspaper endorsements ====
Tom Clements:

- Rock Hill Herald

Jim DeMint:

- Florence Morning News
- Charleston Post and Courier

=== Predictions ===
Source	Ranking	As of
Cook Political Report	Solid R	October 26, 2010
Rothenberg	Safe R	October 22, 2010
RealClearPolitics	Safe R	October 26, 2010
Sabato's Crystal Ball	Safe R	October 21, 2010
CQ Politics	Safe R	October 26, 2010

=== Polling ===
Poll source	Dates administered	Jim DeMint (R)	Alvin Greene (D)	Tom Clements (G)	Other	Undecided
Rasmussen Reports	June 10, 2010	58%	21%	––	9%	13%
Rasmussen Reports	August 3, 2010	62%	20%	––	7%	10%
Rasmussen Reports	August 25, 2010	63%	19%	––	8%	10%
Rasmussen Reports	September 22, 2010	64%	21%	––	10%	5%
Crantford & Associates	October 2, 2010	58%	21%	––	10%	5%
Winthrop University	October 5–10, 2010	58%	11%	12%	3%	14%
Rasmussen Reports	October 19, 2010	58%	21%	––	15%	6%

=== Fundraising ===
Candidate (party)	Receipts	Disbursements	Cash on hand	Debt
Jim DeMint (R)	$3,521,210	$2,915,717	$2,224,594	$0
Alvin Greene (D)	$0	$0	$0	$0
Tom Clements (G)	$45,131	$20,216	$24,915	$0
Source: Federal Election Commission

=== Results ===
United States Senate election in South Carolina, 2010
Party	Candidate	Votes	%	±%
Republican	Jim DeMint (incumbent)	810,771	61.48%	+7.81%
Democratic	Alvin Greene	364,598	27.65%	−16.46%
Green	Tom Clements	121,472	9.21%	+8.95%
	Write-in	21,953	1.66%	+1.58%
Majority		446,173	33.83%	+24.33%
Total votes		1,318,794	50.12%	-18.88%
Republican hold				

==== Counties that flipped from Democratic to Republican ====
- Calhoun (largest town: St. Matthews)
- Clarendon (largest city: Manning)
- Sumter (largest city: Sumter)
- Richland (largest city: Columbia)
- Chesterfield (largest city: Cheraw)
- Colleton (largest city: Walterboro)
- Darlington (largest city: Hartsville)
- Charleston (largest town: Charleston)
- Chester (largest town: Chester)
- McCormick (largest town: McCormick)
- Dillon (largest city: Dillon)
