= Armourer =

Person who makes personal armour

Armourers of the Royal Flying Corps maintaining Lewis guns

Historically, an armourer is a person who makes personal armour, especially plate armour. Historically, armourers were often men, but women could also undertake the occupation: for example, Alice la Haubergere worked as an armourer in Cheapside in the early 1300s, and in 1348 Eustachia l’Armurer was training her husband's daughter, likely in the field.

In modern terms, an armourer is a member of a military or police force who works in an armoury and maintains and repairs small arms and weapons systems, with some duties resembling those of a civilian gunsmith. The term may also be used in film and TV production for a person responsible for prop guns and other weapons; the head of this function is often called a weapons master.

There is increasing evidence that companies specializing in the manufacture of armoured vehicles or applique armour for application onto vehicles of all types (cars, boats, aircraft) are referring to themselves as armourers; such as the UK company OVIK Crossway - which describes its services as Armourers and Coach Builders. In some ways, this is a reversion back to the original meaning of the term insofar as these companies forge, adapt or integrate physical armour onto platforms in order to protect human life.

The title is also used in the sport fencing (the foil, the épée and the sabre) to refer to those who repair fencers' weaponry, safety equipment, fencing-strips, scoring machines, and reels. At sport-fencing events, the individuals responsible for checking equipment safety and maintaining the strips, reels and scoring machines during the tournament are also known as armourers.

With the renewed interest in traditional armour and weaponry the occupation also involves working with film, stage, and historical and reenactment societies. Period costumes may require reproduction armour, swords, and related equipment. The HEMA (Historical European Martial Arts) movement has also revived a more traditional expression of armoury as a skill.

== United Kingdom ==
Armourers are the oldest trade in the British Army and trace their heritage back several centuries. Today they form a core role within the Corps of Royal Electrical and Mechanical Engineers (REME) and work on an extremely wide variety of weapon systems. Typically, armourers are attached to every type of front line operational unit within the British Army such as Infantry, Cavalry, Engineers, Logistics, Special Forces and specialist training teams. They can also be found in larger REME units called REME Battalions, providing in-depth repair and front-line support.

Armourers have the rank of Craftsman—which is the equivalent of Private—upon starting their trade training, and they have similar ranks of the remainder of the Army thereafter. As they increase in rank they can follow one of two streams: Artisan or Artificer. As an Artificer, they must complete a strenuous Selection course and then attend an 18-month intensive engineering course, where they work towards and gain an electrical and mechanical HND. Upon completion, they emerge as a Staff Sergeant (SSGT), and have the potential to reach Warrant Officer Class 1 (WO1) as an Artificer Sergeant Major (ASM), or even gain a Commission. Artisan Armourers who remain working at trade can also achieve WO1, typically as a Regimental Sergeant Major (RSM) of a REME Battalion, and potentially gain a Late Entry (LE) commission.

On a day-to-day basis, armourers maintain a wide variety of weapons and optical equipment; they are typically skilled in the use of hand tools and are able to maintain their equipment across the globe. They are formally required to inspect every weapon annually or every six months (dependent on weapon type), and also advise the end-user on all matters of equipment care. Within a modern Infantry Battalion, they are exposed to the maximum varieties of weapons and optical equipment, with only Special Forces possessing more.

Within the British Royal Air Force (RAF), armourers are considered the most specialized of any trade in the RAF, but they hold a qualification for each specific weapon rather than gaining every qualification for all small arms and larger weapon systems. After spending an initial phase of generic training at RAF Halton with the majority other non-commissioned trainees, they transfer to DCAE Cosford for their trade-specific training. Once qualified they can find themselves employed on a wide variety of tasks, including non-trade-specific jobs such as the flight line servicing of aircraft. As well as prepping, maintaining and loading aircraft bombs, missiles and aircraft assisted escape systems, they are also responsible for the maintenance of explosive release systems and small arms within station armouries like the L85A2 (SA80), 9mm Glock 17 pistol and the GPMG (General Purpose Machine Gun). They can also work alongside Ammunition Technicians of the British Army, Royal Engineers, and Royal Navy Clearance Divers, in an Explosive Ordnance Disposal (EOD) role able to deal with improvised explosive devices and conventional weapons. The founder of the RAF, Lord Trenchard, held armourers in high esteem, saying "without armament, there is no Air Force." Within RAF, squadrons armourers are colloquially known as "pin-monkeys" and, more commonly, "plumbers". The term "plumber" has several possible origins, but most likely stems from the maintenance of the gun turrets on heavy bombers. The turrets were hydraulically and electrically powered and contained pipework, hence the reference to plumbers.

== Ireland ==
Irish Army armourers are the technicians who are responsible for the inspection, maintenance, and repair of all service weapons. These include rifles, light machine guns, pistols, recoilless weapons, heavy machine guns, mortars, and associated equipment, including APC turrets, field kitchens. Personal battle equipment such as helmet, webbing, and respirator also fall within their responsibilities.

Their training takes a minimum of four years, where for the first three years they serve an apprenticeship to qualify as a fitter/turner, and their final year is training within the ordnance school to become armourers. Following a minimum of 5 years of mechanical work experience within an ordnance unit and reaching NCO rank, they can be selected then go onto further training to become what is known as an Armament Artificer (AA)—this training takes a minimum of 5 months.

An Artificer is responsible for advanced maintenance and service inspection of heavy caliber weapons (artillery, anti-aircraft, cavalry main armament, shipborne weapons).

They are part of the Ordnance Corps, which is the only corps of the Irish Army which due to the technical expertise and training required of its members, does not have an Irish reserve force subsidiarity.

Individual line soldiers within an army infantry battalion are responsible for daily cleaning of their individual weapons; both armourers and artificers (also known by their unofficial title of "tiffies") maintain internal and external components and structural integrity of all components of the weapon system by periodical inspection and gauging.

Sighting, missile and robotic systems are maintained by technicians known as Armament Artificers Instrument (AAI). These technicians also serve a four-year apprenticeship and qualify as electrical science engineers.

Weapons that do not pass the armourers' or artificers' inspection are withdrawn from service to be repaired or destroyed. Ordnance personnel are expected to be proficient soldiers and will receive the same amount of training as line soldiers.

They are on occasion expected to participate fully in ceremonial and operational duties, and their rank structure is determined by the branch of the military they serve in, for example: Army- Private, Corporal, and so on.

== Australia ==
In response to the disastrous unloading of the Idomeneus ship in January 1943—where a wharf labourer died and many others were badly gassed by mustard gas leaking from a drum—, the Royal Australian Air Force created a specialist unit: the Chemical Warfare Armourers. Their role was to handle, maintain and move upwards of 1,000,000 chemical weapons imported into Australia to counter a possible Japanese threat.

== United States ==
The title "armorer" was formerly part of several Military Occupational Specialty (MOS) designations across the services. Even where the title has disappeared, those with duties similar to those of earlier armorers are often referred to as such.

- United States Marine Corps
  - 2111 Small Arms Repair Technician
- United States Air Force
  - 3P051B Combat Arms Training and Maintenance (CATM)
- Army of the United States (United States Army in World War II to the end of the war in Vietnam)
  - 511 Armourer

At present, the U.S. Army does not have a Military Occupational Specialty of "armorer". At the unit level, an armorer duty position exists and is filled by soldiers holding the Unit Supply Specialist (92Y) MOS; these soldiers will have received some basic armorer training as part of their MOS training, and will often attend further armorer training when assigned to that duty position. Many of the traditional functions of an armorer are performed by a separate MOS: Small Arms Repairer (MOS 91F, formerly 45B), which performs higher levels of ordnance maintenance and repair.

- United States Army Air Forces (WWII-era successor to the United States Army Air Corps, a precursor to the United States Air Force).
  - 911 Airplane Armorer
  - 612 Airplane Armorer-Gunner

== Notable armourers ==
- John R. Jewitt, an Englishman who wrote a memoir about his years (1802–1805) as a captive of the Nootka people in what is now British Columbia; his writings are an important source of information about indigenous peoples of the Pacific Northwest Coast, and also touch on the training and working life of an armourer in those days.
- Gocha Laghidze, a Georgian-Dutchman, whose armouring skills are considered indispensable by the Dutch and Georgian authorities for the restoration and reconstruction of medieval armour and weaponry.

== See also ==
- List of established military terms
