= Buse =

Buse is a feminine given name of Turkish origin. It means "kiss" in Persian (بوسه) and Turkish. It is also used as a surname in other languages. Notable people with the name include:

== Given name ==
- Buse Arıkazan (born 1994), Turkish pole vaulter
- Buse Arslan (born 1992), Turkish actress
- Buse Naz Çakıroğlu (born 1996), Turkish boxer
- Buse Tosun Çavuşoğlu (born 1995), Turkish freestyle wrestler
- Buse Coskun (born 1989), Turkish figure skater
- Buse Güngör (born 1994), Turkish footballer
- Buse Kayacan (born 1992), Turkish volleyball player
- Buse Savaşkan (born 1999), Turkish-Cypriot high jumper
- Buse Tıraş (born 2003), Turkish judoka
- Buse Ünal (born 1997), Turkish volleyball player

== Surname ==
- Bertie Buse (1910–1992), English cricketer
- Don Buse (born 1950), American basketball player
- Ignacio Buse (born 2004), Peruvian tennis player
- John Buse, American physician
- Matthias Buse (born 1959), German ski jumper

== See also ==
- Buse Township, Minnesota
- La Buse a famous French pirate
