= Vic Rawl =

American politician

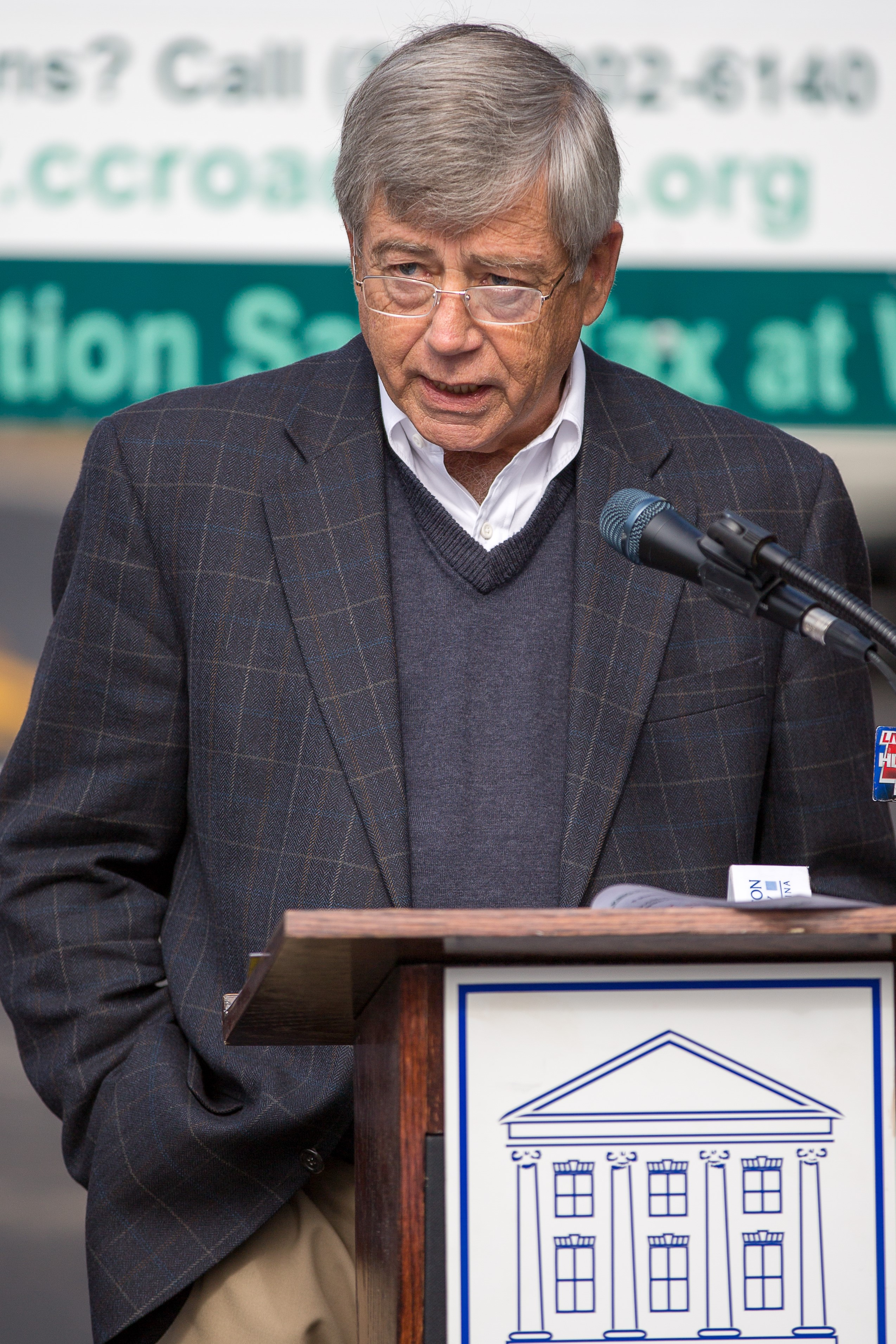

Member of the Charleston County Council from the 6th district
- Incumbent
- Assumed office 2008
- Preceded by: Curtis Bostic

Justice of the 9th South Carolina Circuit Court
- In office 1991–2003

Member of the South Carolina House of Representatives from the 119th district
- In office 1981–1987
- Preceded by: Lawrence Hamner Brinker
- Succeeded by: Theodore Tobias Mappus, Jr
- In office 1977–1979

Personal details
- Born: 1945 or 1946 (age 80–81)
- Party: Democratic
- Spouse: Laura Rawl
- Education: College of Charleston (BA); University of South Carolina (JD)
- Occupation: Jurist

Military service
- Branch/service: United States National Guard
- Years of service: 1968–1994
- Rank: Lieutenant Colonel
- Unit: JAG Corps

A. Victor Rawl (born 1945/1946) is an American politician, attorney, and jurist serving as a member of the Charleston County council in Charleston, South Carolina. Rawl was a candidate for 2010 United States Senate election in South Carolina. He lost the Democratic primary to Alvin Greene in a surprise upset and unsuccessfully protested the outcome of the race.

== Early life and education ==
Rawl grew up on Johns Island, South Carolina and attended the Porter-Gaud School. He graduated from the College of Charleston in 1968. He then graduated from the University of South Carolina School of Law in 1973.

== Career ==
He was an officer in the South Carolina National Guard for twenty-six years. He rose from the ranks of enlisted soldiers to retire with the rank of Lt. Colonel, serving as a Judge Advocate. He was in private law practice 1973 to 1986. He worked as a criminal prosecutor in 1976.

=== House of Representatives ===
Rawl was elected to the South Carolina House of Representatives four times and served from 1977 to 1978 and from 1980 to 1986, for a total of eight years. From 1980 to 1986 Rawl worked on the State Reorganization Commission, S. C. Housing Authority, and S.C. Prison Overcrowding Project.

=== Workers Compensation Commission ===
Rawl served on the Workers Compensation Commission from 1986 to 1990, deciding workers’ compensation cases and becoming familiar with South Carolina workers and the businesses that employ them.

=== S.C. Circuit Court ===
He served as a Circuit Court Judge from 1991 to 2003, presiding over thousands of Criminal and Civil Court cases throughout the State of South Carolina.

=== Charleston County Council ===
Rawl came out of retirement to be elected to Charleston County Council in 2008. His primary concerns on Council are road works, public transit, responsible development, public safety, waste management, and the responsible use of public funds. On council he has worked on recycling issues and voted to install solar panels on the Charleston County Jail to reduce energy costs. He currently sits on the Finance, Planning/Public Works, Public Safety/Health, Economic Development and Audit committees. He is a member of the CARTA board, helping administer one of the nation's most cost-effective public transit systems.

=== 2010 U.S. Senate Candidacy ===
Rawl ran for the Democratic Party's nomination for the United States Senate seat in South Carolina currently held by Republican Jim DeMint. He announced his candidacy in a statewide tour with consultants Harlan Hill and William J. Hampton, kicking off with a rally in Charleston, SC. He was ultimately defeated by Alvin Greene in the June 8 primary in what was widely viewed as a surprising result, given that Greene had little campaign funding and had no campaign staff or website. Rawl filed a formal protest of the official election results. On June 17, 2010, the executive committee of the South Carolina Democratic Party held a formal hearing on the matter. The committee rejected Rawl's request for another primary election, and upheld the June 8 election results.

== Personal life ==
Rawl met his wife, Laura, while attending the College of Charleston. They have been married 40 years and have one son, Vic Jr.
