= Paul Leventhal =

American anti-nuclear activist (1938–2007)

- Born: Paul Lincoln Leventhal; 12 February 1938; Manhattan, New York, U.S.
- Died: 10 April 2007 (aged 69); Chevy Chase, Maryland, U.S.
- Occupations: Journalist, nuclear nonproliferation expert
- Known for: Founder of the Nuclear Control Institute
- Spouse: Sharon Tanzer
- Children: 2

Paul Lincoln Leventhal (12 February 1938 – 10 April 2007) was an American journalist and nuclear nonproliferation advocate. He was the founder and long-serving president of the Nuclear Control Institute (NCI).

== Early life ==
Leventhal was born in Manhattan, New York, the son of Jack and Helen Shapiro Leventhal. He graduated magna cum laude from Franklin & Marshall College in 1959 after which he earned a master’s degree in journalism from the Columbia School of Journalism in 1960.

Leventhal began his career as an investigative reporter at The Plain Dealer, later working for the New York Post and Newsday.

== Career ==
In 1969, Senator Jacob K. Javits appointed Leventhal as press secretary, where he began focusing on energy issues. He contributed to major U.S. legislation including the Energy Reorganization Act of 1974 and the Nuclear Non-Proliferation Act of 1978. Leventhal also co-directed the Three Mile Island investigation (1979–1980) and was staff director of the Senate subcommittee on nuclear regulation.

In 1977, Leventhal helped expose the Plumbat affair, in which about 200 tonnes of yellowcake (processed uranium ore) were secretly shipped to Israel for its nuclear weapons program. Disguised as “Plumbat” (lead) to evade controls, the cargo was diverted at sea. His work drew attention to gaps in safeguards and contributed to the 1978 Nuclear Non-Proliferation Act.

== Nuclear Control Institute ==
Leventhal founded the Nuclear Control Institute in 1981, serving as president for over twenty years. Through lobbying, writing, and international visits, he argued that commercial nuclear power increased risks of weapons proliferation and terrorism. In June 2002 he became Founding President.

== Later life and death ==
Leventhal warned against the expansion of nuclear energy as a response to climate change, citing security risks. He remained active in public debates on nuclear issues until shortly before his death from cancer on 10 April 2007 at his home in Chevy Chase, Maryland. He was survived by his wife, Sharon Tanzer, their two sons and two grandchildren.
