= Alvin Greene =

American politician (1977–2026)

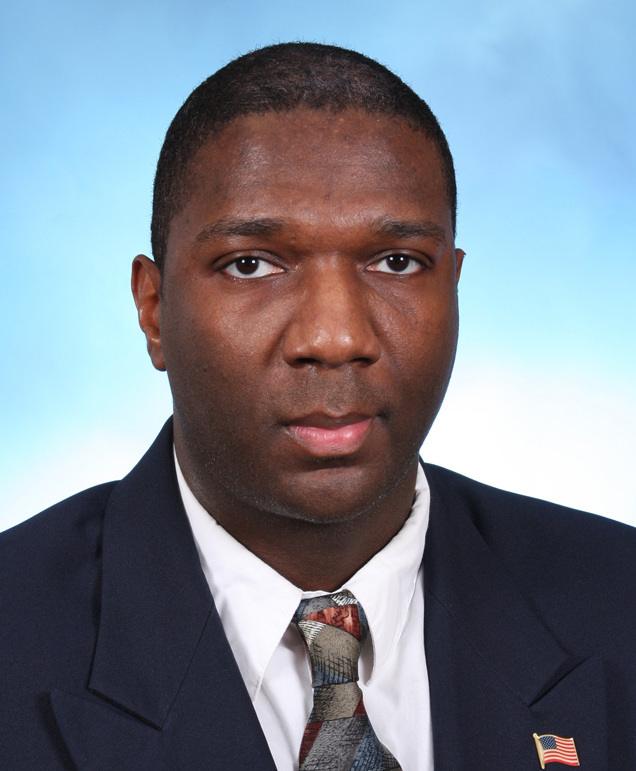
- Greene in 2009

Personal details
- Born: Alvin Michael Greene; August 30, 1977 Florence, South Carolina, U.S.
- Died: March 3, 2026 (aged 48) Manning, South Carolina, U.S.
- Party: Democratic
- Education: University of South Carolina, Columbia (BA)
- Website: Campaign website (archived)

Military service
- Allegiance: United States
- Branch/service: United States Air Force; United States Army
- Years of service: 1996–2009
- Unit: Army National Guard
- Awards: Global War on Terrorism Service Medal; Air Force Good Conduct Medal; Korea Defense Service Medal; National Defense Service Medal

Alvin Michael Greene (August 30, 1977 – March 3, 2026) was an American politician. He was known for being the Democratic nominee in the 2010 United States Senate election in South Carolina. Greene was the first African-American to be nominated for U.S. Senate by a major party in South Carolina.

On June 8, 2010, Greene won an unexpected victory in the South Carolina Democratic primary for U.S. Senate. Despite the fact that he did not actively campaign for the position, he defeated Charleston County councilmember and former state legislator Vic Rawl, 59%–41%. Members of Greene's own party questioned the legitimacy of his victory. In June 2010, the executive committee of the South Carolina Democratic Party held a hearing to assess the legitimacy of the primary results and found insufficient evidence of impropriety to justify holding a new primary election. Nevertheless, the South Carolina Democratic Party called for Greene to withdraw his candidacy, asserting that pending criminal charges against him would make victory impossible. During his general election campaign, Greene became known for "strange, well-documented behavior on the campaign trail," for the intense media attention he received, and for continuing to pursue his Senate bid despite having been indicted. He was defeated by incumbent Republican U.S. Senator Jim DeMint, 61.48%–27.65%.

Greene later ran for the South Carolina state legislature in a February 2011 special election, receiving 37 votes.

== Early life and military service ==
Greene was born in Florence, South Carolina, on August 30, 1977. His father, James Greene Sr., was a retired teacher from the Clemson Extension program, a barber, and a nightclub owner "who wanted blacks to play a bigger role in politics and entertainment". Greene received a bachelor's degree in political science from the University of South Carolina in 2000.

Greene served as a unit supply specialist in the U.S. Army from February 2007 to August 2009. He also previously served in the South Carolina Air National Guard from 1995 to 2002, on active duty with the U.S. Air Force as an intelligence specialist from July 2002 to September 2005 and with the Army National Guard for seven months prior to joining the Army. During Greene's time in the Air Force, he received numerous poor evaluations from his superiors. The evaluations stated that Greene was an ineffective leader who was disorganized, made costly errors, and could not clearly express his thoughts. Greene received an honorable but involuntary discharge from the Army in 2009 after a 13-year career. For his military service, Greene received the Air Force Good Conduct Medal, the Army Reserve Components Achievement Medal, the National Defense Service Medal, the Global War on Terrorism Service Medal, the Korea Defense Service Medal, the Non-Commissioned Officer Professional Development Ribbon, the Army Service Ribbon, and the Air Force Training Ribbon.

== Political campaigns ==
=== U.S. Senate campaign, 2010 ===
==== Democratic primary ====
Greene said that he originally got the idea to run for office in 2008 when he was stationed in Korea. On June 8, 2010, he won the South Carolina Democratic primary for U.S. Senate, receiving 100,362 (59%) votes out of 170,215 votes cast; 69,853 (41%) went to Vic Rawl. Greene's victory over Rawl, a Charleston County councilmember and former state legislator, was described as an upset. At the time of his Senate campaign, Greene was unemployed and living with and caring for his father in Manning, South Carolina. Greene won the primary despite very limited campaigning and campaign spending and despite having no website and no yard signs. Voter turnout in most counties was in the range of 20–30%.

==== Questions about candidacy ====
Greene was declared the winner and Rawl congratulated him on his win, but Democratic officials began to voice opposition and to raise questions about Greene and his campaign. He did not attend the state Democratic party convention, did not file legally required forms with the Secretary of the Senate or Federal Election Commission, and attempted to pay his $10,440 filing fee with a personal check instead of a check from a campaign account.

Though his primary victory baffled many, some possible explanations were offered. South Carolina State Senator Robert Ford claimed that the surname "Greene" is common among African-Americans, and suggested that fact may have caused African-American voters to identify with him. Some, including House Majority Whip Jim Clyburn, speculated that Greene was a Republican plant and called for an investigation into the primary. Officials noted that similar tactics had been used in the past, including in a 1990 primary in South Carolina. Greene denied the assertion that he was a Republican plant. Vic Rawl's campaign issued a press release that election forensics analyst Walter Mebane had "performed second-digit Benford's law tests on the precinct returns from the Senate race" and found improbable vote patterns. Michael Miller reportedly found a significant difference in the vote percentages in absentee voters and election day voters, indicating a corrupted count.

Some commentators raised questions about the source of Greene's funding for the $10,440 filing fee. Federal and state law requires a candidate to pay a filing fee out of his own pocket. Greene claimed that he paid the filing fee by saving two years of his service pay. However, Greene qualified to be represented by a public defender in his obscenity case, in which charges were handed down that same year. Former state Democratic Party chairman Dick Harpootlian told NPR that this revelation raised doubts about whether Greene could have afforded the filing fee.

In response to an official protest filed by Rawl, the executive committee of the South Carolina Democratic Party conducted a formal hearing on June 17, 2010 to assess the legitimacy of the primary election results. Greene neither attended nor sent a representative to the hearing. The executive committee of the South Carolina Democratic Party voted 55 to 10 to reject Rawl's request for a new Senate primary, finding insufficient evidence of impropriety to disturb the primary election result.

On June 27, 2010, the South Carolina Law Enforcement Division and the 5th Circuit Solicitor's office announced that they were investigating Greene's finances. On the same day, it emerged that Greene's public defender had been replaced by a private attorney. On July 9, 2010, Greene was cleared of wrongdoing after a state criminal probe determined he had indeed paid the $10,400 election-related filing fee from his own personal funds.

At multiple points during the campaign, the South Carolina Democratic Party called for Greene to withdraw his candidacy. In August 2010, South Carolina Democratic Party chairwoman Carol Fowler asserted that the criminal charges against Greene would make it impossible for him to run a statewide campaign.

==== Media coverage ====
Greene was referred to as an enigmatic figure in American politics. He was known for his "strange, well-documented behavior on the campaign trail". In a June 2010 interview, CNN's Don Lemon asked Greene about his mental state and cognitive ability.

Much attention was devoted to Greene's manner of speaking due to his habits of frequently interrupting himself, halting in mid-sentence, and saying "OK" between statements. At times, his jokes were not well understood by the media; for example, he told British newspaper The Guardian that one way to create jobs would be to employ people to create toys in his likeness. A study by the Pew Research Center released in late July 2010 found that Greene's campaign had received the most media attention of all of the 2010 political campaigns.

In late July 2010, a hip hop-based viral video entitled "Alvin Greene is on the scene" became a hit on YouTube and other internet sites, garnering thousands of views an hour. It promoted Greene's candidacy and intermixed media clips of him with clips of LeBron James. AutoTune was used to manipulate some of the lyrics. Greene denied that he played any role in the production of the video.

In August 2010, a reporter visited Greene's home and asked about his recent indictment. In response, Greene "ordered the reporter to 'leave [his] property' and 'go away'". When the reporter "stopped briefly to talk with Greene's brother Jimmy, Alvin Greene began howling and wailing the words, 'no' and 'go'".

==== General election ====
Greene was the first African-American to be nominated for the U.S. Senate by a major party in South Carolina. The day after the primary election, the media reported that Greene was facing felony obscenity charges stemming from a November 2009 arrest for allegedly showing a pornographic picture on an Internet site to an 18-year-old female University of South Carolina student in a computer lab and allegedly saying, "Let's go to your room". Greene refused to bow out of the race, asserting that "the Democratic Party has chosen their nominee, and we have to stand behind their choice. The people have spoken. We need to be pro-South Carolina, not anti-Greene".

Greene hired South Carolina attorney Suzanne Coe as his campaign manager. Coe said she offered to assist Greene after being struck by his honesty and selfless motivation.

The progressive watchdog organization Citizens for Responsibility and Ethics in Washington named Greene to their list of the 11 most crooked candidates vying for federal office in 2010. Greene took exception to this designation, saying that "I think my opponent should be on this list. He's not doing his job and he doesn't care about South Carolina or the United States of America."

In the general election, Greene faced DeMint, Green Party candidate Tom Clements, and write-in candidates Nathalie Dupree and Mazie Ferguson. On November 2, 2010, Greene lost to DeMint by a margin of 61.48% to 27.65%, with Clements receiving 9.21% of the vote.

=== South Carolina House of Representatives campaign, 2011 ===
On December 24, 2010, Greene filed as a candidate in the Democratic primary special election for the South Carolina House of Representatives seat left vacant by the death of Representative Cathy Harvin. The primary was held on February 15, 2011; Greene received 37 votes.

=== Potential presidential campaign, 2012 ===
After he lost the 2010 Senate election, Greene reportedly asked the South Carolina Democratic Party how much the filing fee would be to run for President of the United States. The next day, he confirmed to the Columbia Free Times that he was "seriously considering" a presidential campaign, although he was not sure which party's nomination he would seek.

=== Political positions ===
==== Economy ====
During his 2010 Senate campaign, Greene's campaign slogan was: "Let's get South Carolina back to work." Greene favored measures to lower the price of gas and supported offshore drilling.

==== Government reform ====
Greene cited the example of mismanagement at the Pentagon as proof that greater accountability in government is needed. He criticized corporate influence on politics, saying that "Half the members of the U.S. Senate work for BP. The other half work for Halliburton."

==== Health care ====
In an editorial published in The Guardian as "The Alvin Greene manifesto for a fairer America", Greene explained his political views in more detail and attacked the political establishment. Greene advocated free universal health care, saying that the United States should model its system on Austria, Britain, or Canada.

==== Judicial reform ====
Greene supported the idea that the severity of penalty for a misdeed or wrongdoing should be reasonable and proportionate to the severity of the infraction. "Fairness saves us money," he said in an interview. "There are innocent people incarcerated. We spend more than two times of our taxpayer dollars on inmates than on students."

== Criminal proceedings ==
=== 2010 obscenity charges ===
In June 2010, the media reported that Greene was facing felony obscenity charges stemming from an incident that had occurred the previous fall at the University of South Carolina. The incident occurred in a basement computer lab on the University of South Carolina campus. According to student Camille McCoy, a man (later identified as Greene) told her to look at his computer screen; pornographic images were displayed on it. McCoy told him that this was "offensive and not funny". Greene then allegedly asked if he could come to her room. McCoy stated that the situation "was kind of scary. He's a pretty big boy. He could've overpowered me." McCoy then went to her room and told her resident mentor what had happened. Greene was later arrested. Greene asserted that he was joking when he spoke to McCoy, and that he believed she owed him an apology for pressing charges. In an affidavit, police said that they had surveillance video showing the interaction.

On August 12, 2010, a Richland County grand jury indicted Greene for disseminating, procuring or promoting obscenity (a felony) as well as a misdemeanor charge of communicating obscene materials to a person without consent. On June 6, 2011, Greene accepted the Richland County prosecutor's offer to enter a pretrial diversion program which would expunge his record of both charges after he completed a year-long course of counseling and community service.

=== 2013 arrest ===
On August 9, 2013, Greene was arrested on a trespassing charge at an apartment complex in Myrtle Beach, South Carolina. A report says Greene was walking around at night, was disoriented, and asked for paramedics. The paramedics checked on Greene, who was then taken into custody.

== Death ==
Greene died of pneumonia at McLeod Health Clarendon in Manning, South Carolina on March 3, 2026 at the age of 48.

Party political offices
Preceded by Inez Tenenbaum	Democratic nominee for U.S. Senator from South Carolina (Class 1); 2010	Succeeded by Joyce Dickerson
