= Tee Ferguson =

American politician

Member of the South Carolina House of Representatives from the 31st district
- In office 1983–1989
- Preceded by: Hudson L. Barksdale Sr.
- Succeeded by: Donald W. Beatty

Personal details
- Born: November 3, 1950 Spartanburg, South Carolina, United States
- Died: October 7, 2011 (aged 60)
- Party: Democratic
- Education: Wofford College University of South Carolina School of Law
- Occupation: Attorney and businessman

James C. 'Tee' Ferguson (November 3, 1950 - October 7, 2011) was an American politician, attorney and circuit judge from Spartanburg.

Ferguson was a Democratic member of the South Carolina House of Representatives from the 31st District, serving from 1983 to 1989. He served on the Advisory Committee on the Commission of Higher Education.

Ferguson lost his seat as a result of Operation Lost Trust.

== Post-legislative career ==
Ferguson was co-owner of a medical equipment and supply business in North Carolina.

In 2004, Ferguson ran for U. S. Senate under the United Citizens Party. The election was won by Republican candidate Jim DeMint.

== Death ==
Ferguson died in 2011.

== See also ==
- List of African-American United States Senate candidates
