= White Rural Rage =

2024 book by Thomas Schaller and Paul Waldman

White Rural Rage: The Threat to American Democracy
- Hardcover edition
- Author: Thomas Schaller and Paul Waldman
- Language: English
- Subject: Political science
- Publisher: Penguin Random House
- Publication date: February 27, 2024
- Publication place: United States
- Pages: 320
- ISBN: 978-0593729144

White Rural Rage: The Threat to American Democracy is a 2024 book by political science professor Thomas Schaller and op-ed columnist Paul Waldman. The book examines the supposed threat posed to the United States by rural white right-wing extremism. The book received mixed reviews in the press, while academics cited in the book said the authors misrepresented their work.

== Overview ==
Schaller and Waldman claim that despite their "outsize political power," white rural voters see themselves as neglected by the U.S. political system, with challenges such as inadequate healthcare, crumbling infrastructure, and economic decline. The book argues that this disillusionment, fueled by Republican politicians and right-wing media, creates a sense of betrayal among rural whites, leading them to reject democratic norms and embrace extremist ideologies. Schaller and Waldman claim that white rural voters are a unique threat to U.S. democracy and propose a reimagined political landscape that addresses the grievances of rural America while protecting the country's democratic principles.

== Reception ==
Paul Krugman, in The New York Times, said that White Rural Rage discusses the process of technological change and its effects on rural areas "in devastating, terrifying and baffling detail." Agreeing with the authors' thesis, he wrote that "while white rural rage is arguably the single greatest threat facing American democracy, I have no good ideas about how to fight it."

Washington Post editor Mary Jo Murphy wrote that White Rural Rage "goes for the jugular" when discussing its subjects, saying that Hillary Clinton's 2016 "basket of deplorables" comment "sounds almost quaint" in comparison. Despite this, Murphy added that the authors back up their analysis by "stuff[ing] the chapters with empirical data, citing dozens of polls and studies".

Salon writer Amanda Marcotte said that the book "refreshingly holds rural white voters to account for their choices, and for willfully gobbling down right-wing propaganda."

Lloyd Green, in The Guardian, wrote that Schaller and Waldman "seek to cover a lot of ground but often come up short." Green argued that the book "neglects key factors" that hurt the Democratic Party in rural areas, such as the party's messaging on crime.

In a review in Jacobin magazine, Ryan Zickgraf faulted the authors for ignoring how Trump's support had also been steadily ticking up among working-class Latino and black voters: "Instead of addressing these inconvenient truths and attempting to provide serious recommendations about how to combat the rising far right, White Rural Rage serves up calculated journalistic White Urban Rage against working-class people who vote for pandering politicians that only pay them lip service – which, of course, is not a feature exclusive to poor GOP voters.... Not that we should be surprised: elites scapegoating white workers is as American as apple pie."

=== Critical responses from academics ===
Multiple academics whose research was cited in White Rural Rage said that Schaller and Waldman had misinterpreted their and others' work. Political scientist Nicholas Jacobs criticized the book for using the word "rage" instead of "resentment," which he saw as a more accurate characterization of white rural voters' attitudes. Jacobs further claimed that the authors committed logical fallacies when interpreting data and relied on polls with questionable methodology, noting that they had not conducted their own research for the book. Jacobs made similar claims in an article for Reason with political science professor B. Kal Munis, writing that "Schaller and Waldman repeatedly commit academic malpractice" by "misrepresent[ing] the findings of multiple scholars who have built careers conducting research on rural politics and identity."

In a Newsweek article, political science professor Kristin Lunz Trujillo wrote that the book "makes a lot of negative assertions" about its subjects "without the methodological rigor or correct characterization of existing literature to back it up." Lunz Trujillo noted that her research found that rural American identity is based more on positive emotions toward one's community, rather than rage and other negative emotions toward outsiders. She argued that White Rural Rage was "a prime example of how intellectuals sow distrust by villainizing a group of people who are already disproportionately shut out from science, higher education, and similar opportunities."

The Atlantic contributing writer and environmental studies professor Tyler Austin Harper said that after speaking with over 20 scholars of rural studies, he was "convinced that the book is poorly researched and intellectually dishonest." Harper highlighted several issues with the book, including Schaller and Waldman's loose definitions of what constitutes a "rural" community. He accused the authors of "warp[ing] the evidence to deflect blame away from metro areas, onto rural ones". For example, an article the authors cited to support their claim that "the threat of political violence is particularly acute in rural America" actually contradicted that claim, finding that political violence in the U.S. has been greatest in the suburbs.

Responding to these critiques in an essay for The New Republic, Schaller and Waldman said that they had been "surprised by the ferocity of the criticism we have received from scholars of rural politics." They wrote that there was a "clear discomfort with the implications" of recent research "showing some disturbing patterns of opinion among rural voters, especially rural whites". While acknowledging that their critics had identified "a few errors" in the book, Schaller and Waldman added that "their legitimate criticisms are buried in a pile of personal insults, factual inaccuracies, and apologetics for rural whites... In rising to the defense of their subjects, the scholars discount or ignore the disturbing beliefs many (though not all) rural whites hold and work hard to justify and validate their resentments."
