= WMXP-LP =

- Greenville; United States
- Broadcast area: Upstate South Carolina
- Frequency: 95.5 FM

Programming
- Format: Silent, was Urban Adult Contemporary, Urban Contemporary

Ownership
- Owner: Malcolm X Grassroots Movement

History
- First air date: June 10, 2007
- Call sign meaning: Malcolm X ExPerience

Technical information
- Licensing authority: FCC
- Facility ID: 132472
- Class: L1
- ERP: 86 watts
- HAAT: 32.3 meters
- Transmitter coordinates: 34°48′30″N 82°22′11″W

Links
- Public license information: LMS
- Webcast: Listen live
- Website: www.wmxp955.org

WMXP-LP is a low-powered FM community radio station located in (and licensed to) Greenville, South Carolina. The station broadcasts on 95.5 FM with an ERP of 100 watts. The station is silent as of July 16, 2023

== Station history ==
WMXP-LP signed on the air June 10, 2007. The station is owned by the Malcolm X Grassroots Movement, founded by activist and attorney Efia Nwangaza. It was launched with the help of hundreds of local and national volunteers at the eleventh community radio barnraising of the Prometheus Radio Project. It is a non-commercial station, dedicated to African-American culture programming, claiming that it "will give a voice to the voiceless, and a home to knowledge, community enrichment and social justice advocacy."

According to the FCC database, WMXP-LP went silent on May 20, 2011. No official reason is known.

The station returned to the air on May 18, 2012 from a new transmitter site via FCC Special Temporary Authority (STA) for lower antenna height while new 120 foot tower is being constructed. Signal strength is strong in most of the city due to unique audio processing and temporarily monophonic signal.

On July 16, 2023, WMXP-LP went silent again due to WLTE (originally on 95.9 MHz) moving to 95.5 FM, and it is unknown if WMXP-LP will come back on a new frequency.

== See also ==
- List of community radio stations in the United States
