= Jack Bass =

American author and journalist (1934–2026)

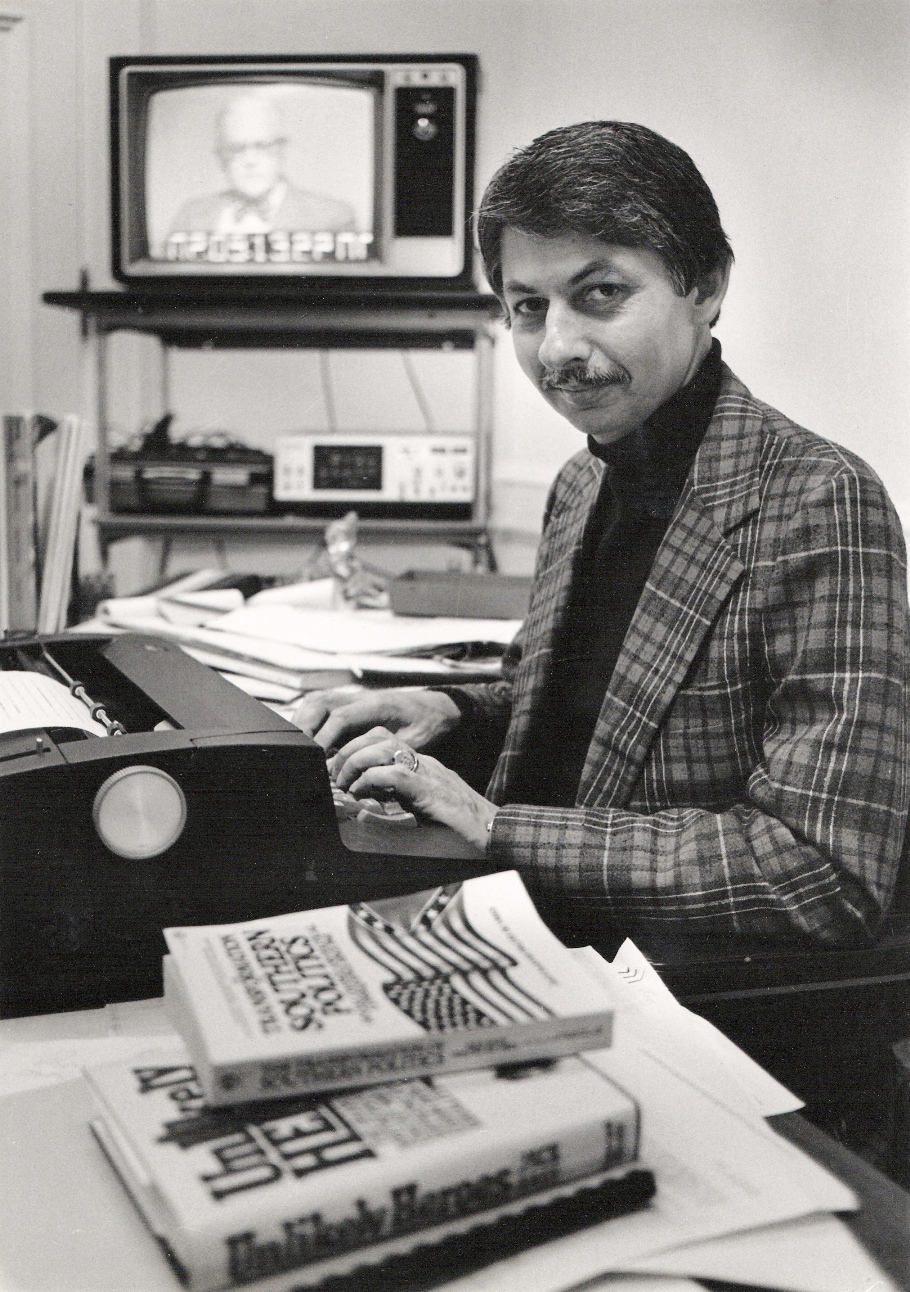
- Bass in 1981
- Born: June 24, 1934; Columbia, South Carolina, US
- Died: April 23, 2026 (aged 91); Durham, North Carolina, US
- Education: University of South Carolina (BA in Journalism) (1956); Emory University (PhD in American Studies)
- Occupations: Author, journalist
- Spouse(s): Carolyn McClurg (divorced) Alice R. Cabaniss (divorced) Nathalie Dupree (m. 1994; died 2025)
- Children: 3

Jack Solomon Bass (June 24, 1934 – April 23, 2026) was an American author and journalist.

== Early life ==
Bass was born in Columbia, South Carolina, on June 24, 1934, to Nathan and Esther (Cohen) Bass and grew up in the town of North as the youngest of seven children. He graduated from the University of South Carolina in 1956 with a degree in journalism.

He served in the U.S. Navy, attending officer's candidate school in Newport, Rhode Island. He served for three years at Naval Air Station North Island in Coronado, California, as well as in the Philippines.

== Career ==
When Bass resigned from the Navy, he and his family moved to Charleston, South Carolina, where he began his work as a professional journalist. He worked at The News and Courier (Charleston), a co-owned weekly paper, The West Ashley Journal, and The State (Columbia). He received a Nieman Fellowship from Harvard University for 1965–66.

From 1966 to 1973 Bass worked as the Columbia Bureau Chief for The Charlotte Observer as well as a part-time lecturer for journalism at the University of South Carolina. Bass taught at a number of universities including the University of Mississippi and the College of Charleston.

He was named South Carolina Newspaperman of the Year in 1968 and 1972. His The Transformation of Southern Politics was on the American Library Association's "Notable Books for Adults List" for 1976, and he received a Robert F. Kennedy Book Award for "Taming the Storm" in 1994.

== Personal life and death ==
Bass had three children by his first wife Carolyn McClung Smoak. He had seven grandchildren. His second marriage was to Alice Cabaniss, but they divorced. His third wife was the author and television cooking personality Nathalie Dupree, marrying in 1994.

Jack Bass died of complications from Alzheimer's disease in Durham, North Carolina, on April 23, 2026, aged 91.

== Bibliography ==
- The Orangeburg Massacre 1970 with Jack Nelson, ISBN 9780865545526
- "Porgy Comes Home" 1972
- The Transformation of Southern Politics 1976, with Walter DeVries, ISBN 9780820317281
- Unlikely Heroes, 1981 ISBN 9780817304911
- The American South Comes of Age, 1995, ISBN 9780075542056
- Taming the storm: the life and times of Judge Frank M. Johnson and the South's fight over civil rights 1993, ISBN 9780385413480
- Ol' Strom 1998, with Marilyn W. Thompson, ISBN 9781563525230
- Strom: The Complicated Personal and Political Life of Strom Thurmond 2005, with Marilyn W. Thompson, ISBN 9781586482978
- The Palmetto State: The Making of Modern South Carolina 2012, with Scott Poole, ISBN 9781611171327
