= Benjamin Hutto =

American musician

W. Benjamin Hutto
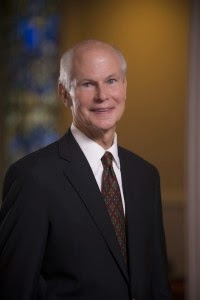
- Born: October 4, 1947; Charleston, South Carolina, U.S.
- Died: September 29, 2015 (aged 67); Washington, D.C., U.S.
- Education: Gaud School, Emory University, Westminster Choir College, Royal School of Church Music, University of the South
- Occupations: Composer, Conductor, Teacher, Performer

W. Benjamin Hutto (October 4, 1947 – September 29, 2015) was an American musician who specialized in writing, producing, and directing choral music. He served as Director of Choral Activities and Director of Performing Arts at St. Albans School for Boys and the National Cathedral School for Girls in Washington D.C. He was also Director of Music and Organist at St. John's Episcopal Church, Lafayette Square.

== Biography ==
Hutto was born in Charleston, South Carolina, in 1947. He received a Bachelor of Arts degree (English) from Emory, then studied at Westminster Choir College, and at the Royal School of Church Music in England. In 1989 he completed the Education for Ministry Program at the School of Theology through the University of the South. In 1998 he was named a Fellow of the Royal School of Church Music. In 2013 he was awarded the degree of Doctor of Humane Letters (honoris causa) from Virginia Theological Seminary.

He served as President of the Association of Anglican Musicians (1988-1989) and the Royal School of Church Music in America (1999-2006). He served as instructor and director of choral music at the Porter-Gaud School (Charleston) from 1969 to 1985. Simultaneously, he was Organist and Choirmaster at the (Episcopal) Cathedral of St. Luke and St. Paul. He was a co-founder of the organ recital series for Piccolo Spoleto, part of the Spoleto Festival USA. From 1985 to 1999, he was Organist and Choirmaster at Christ Church (Episcopal) in Charlotte. From 1999 until his death, he was Director of Choral Activities and Director of Performing Arts at St. Albans School for Boys and National Cathedral School for Girls in Washington, DC. From 2009 until his death, he also served as Director of Music Ministry and Organist at historic St. John's Church, Lafayette Square, in Washington, the "Church of the Presidents." He served as Dean of both the Charleston (SC) and the Charlotte (NC) Chapters of the American Guild of Organists.

As a choral conductor, Hutto has presented children's choir workshops and served on panels for regional and national conferences for numerous professional educational and music organizations. During his time in Washington, his school choirs and young singers appeared on National Public Radio, with the Cathedral Choral Society, the Choral Arts Society of Washington, the Washington Master Chorale, and the Juilliard Orchestra, at performances in the Kennedy Center, and on national television. His singers toured from coast to coast in the United States and internationally to Australia, South Africa, Chile and Argentina. He conducted workshops and summer courses for the Royal School of Church Music in many parts of the United States, as well as in Canada, the United Kingdom, Ireland, and South Africa.

Hutto held memberships in Sigma Chi social fraternity, Omicron Delta Kappa university leadership society, the American Guild of Organists, the Association of Anglican Musicians, the Royal School of Church Music, and the Cosmos Club.

Hutto wrote several Anglican chants for The Hymnal 1982 and has several published anthems.

On the September 11, 2015, episode of the Late Show with Stephen Colbert, Stephen Colbert apologized to Hutto, his choir teacher at the Porter-Gaud School, for being a poor student.

He died of gallbladder cancer on 29 September 2015.

== Honors and positions ==
Hutto was a past president of the Royal School of Church Music in North America. He was the Director of Performing Arts at St. Albans School and National Cathedral School, and Director of Music Ministry and Organist at St. John's Church, Lafayette Square. He was named a Fellow of the Royal School of Church Music in 1998, and awarded the degree of Doctor of Humane Letters (honoris causa) by Virginia Theological Seminary in 2013. He composed a number of works which have been included in the 1982 Hymnal of the Episcopal Church, and he has several published anthems.
