= Nuclear Control Institute =

American non-profit organization

The Nuclear Control Institute is a research and advocacy center for preventing nuclear proliferation and nuclear terrorism. The non-profit organization was founded by Paul Leventhal in 1981. It went under a reorganization in 2003 to make it a web-based program. The institute is supported by the donations of philanthropic foundations and individuals.

The Nuclear Control Institute is particularly focused on the elimination of plutonium and highly enriched uranium, which can be used to create nuclear weapons, from nuclear power plants and research reactors, and preventing plutonium and highly enriched uranium from dismantled nuclear weapons from being disposed of in commercial reactors. This means that they are strongly opposed to the use of mixed oxide fuel.

Tom Clements is the executive director.

== See also ==
- Anti-nuclear movement in the United States
