= Nathalie Dupree =

American cooking personality (1939–2025)

- Born: Nathalie Evelyn Meyer; December 23, 1939; Hamilton, New Jersey, U.S.
- Died: January 13, 2025 (aged 85); Raleigh, North Carolina, U.S.
- Education: Le Cordon Bleu
- Spouse(s): David Dupree (divorced), Jack Bass
- Culinary career
- Cooking style: Cuisine of the Southern United States
- Television show
- New Southern Cooking With Nathalie Dupree

Nathalie Evelyn Dupree (née Meyer; December 23, 1939 – January 13, 2025) was an American author, chef, and cooking show host whose work focused on American Southern cuisine. She was the first woman since Julia Child to host more than one hundred cooking episodes on public television. Her first show, New Southern Cooking with Nathalie Dupree was followed by eight more series.

== Early life ==
Nathalie Evelyn Meyer was born in Hamilton, New Jersey, on December 23, 1939, the daughter of Evelyn Cook and army officer Walter G. Meyer. Following her parents' divorce, she and two siblings grew up with her mother in Virginia and Texas. She attended college, but did not graduate. She had her first experience of cooking in 1958 in a communal kitchen at Harvard University, which went badly. While in college she became politically active for the first time, as a 20-year-old precinct captain for John F. Kennedy's presidential campaign. In the late 1960s Nathalie and her husband David Dupree moved to London, where she took a class at the London Le Cordon Bleu school. She stayed for more classes, earning a certificate from the school. During her time at the school she met Julia Child, who encouraged her to pursue a teaching career.

== Culinary career ==
Following her culinary studies, Dupree operated a kitchen at a restaurant in Mallorca. After a review of the restaurant described her as a "kitchen manager" rather than as a chef, she quit. Settling in Georgia in the early 1970s, she opened a restaurant. "Nathalie's" was located in the back of an antique shop owned by her husband in Social Circle, Georgia. At Nathalie's, Dupree applied French cooking techniques to traditional Southern American cooking. In 1975, Dupree became the director of a cooking school at Rich's department store in Atlanta, instructing over 10,000 students over a decade of teaching. Guests and teachers at the school included Shirley Corriher, Paula Wolfert, Julia Child, Paul Prudhomme and Jacques Pepin.

Dupree first appeared in her PBS television show, New Southern Cooking with Nathalie Dupree, after she was contacted by the White Lily flour company, which offered to sponsor the show. The show and a companion cookbook brought Dupree to regional and national prominence, establishing her as an influential culinary figure. Dupree attributed her interest in a television show to Graham Kerr's show The Galloping Gourmet. Dupree's show was noted for its embrace of mistakes and mishaps, with Dupree offering encouragement to viewers to be unafraid of their own errors through her example.

Dupree authored of 15 cookbooks, selling nearly a million copies, and the host of more than 300 national and international cooking shows, which have aired since 1986 on PBS, The Food Network, and The Learning Channel. She appeared many times on Today and Good Morning America. She won wide recognition for her work, including four James Beard Awards including "Who's who in American Cuisine", Grande Dame of Les Dames d' Escoffier and numerous other awards. She was best known for bringing culinary techniques to traditional Southern cooking, popularizing Southern foods as a relevant and serious cuisine.

She was a founder and two-time president of the International Association of Culinary Professionals, founder and co-president of both the Atlanta and Charleston, South Chapters of Les Dames d'Escoffier, founding chairman of the Charleston Food and Wine Festival, and past president of the Atlanta Chapter of the International Women's Forum.

== Personal life and political activism ==
In the late 1990s, Dupree moved to Charleston, South Carolina, where she authored a newspaper column and became an advocate for dining and cooking in Charleston. In 1994, she married her third husband, Jack Bass, an author and historian.

Dupree mounted a write-in campaign against incumbent Senator Jim DeMint in the 2010 Senate election in South Carolina. She sought DeMint's seat as a long shot, seeking to "cook his goose." She expressed a willingness to work alongside fellow South Carolina Senator Lindsey Graham to "bring home the bacon" for the state.

In 2020, she moved to Raleigh, North Carolina, to be closer to Bass's family. She lived in a retirement community in Raleigh, and died at the age of 85, on January 13, 2025 after suffering a broken hip.

== Books ==
- Nathalie Dupree Cooks for Family and Friends ISBN 978-0-688-09767-7, William Morrow & Co (January 1, 1991)
- Nathalie Dupree’s Matters of Taste ISBN 978-0-394-57851-4, Alfred A. Knopf (March 3, 1992)
- Nathalie Dupree Cooks Great Meals For Busy Days ISBN 978-0-517-59734-7, Clarkson Potter (May 31, 1994)
- Nathalie Dupree Cooks Everyday Meals From A Well-Stocked Pantry: Strategies for Shopping Less and Eating Better ISBN 978-0-517-59735-4, Clarkson Potter (January 24, 1995)
- Nathalie Dupree Cooks Quick Meals For Busy Days: 180 Delicious Timesaving Recipes ISBN 978-0-517-59736-1, Clarkson Potter (February 20, 1996)
- New Southern Cooking ISBN 978-0-8203-2630-6, University of Georgia Press (April 5, 2004)
- Nathalie Dupree's Southern Memories Recipes and Reminiscences ISBN 978-0-8203-2601-6, University of Georgia Press (April 5, 2004)
- Mastering the Art of Southern Vegetables ISBN 978-1-4236-3738-7, Gibbs-Smith 2013
- Mastering the Art of Southern Cooking, ISBN 978-1-4236-0275-0, Gibbs-Smith 2012
- Nathalie Dupree's Comfortable Entertaining At Home with Ease and Grace ISBN 978-0-8203-4513-0, University of Georgia Press (April 1, 2013)
- Nathalie Dupree's Shrimp and Grits*, revised ISBN 978-1-4236-3665-6, Gibbs Smith; Revised ed. edition (May 1, 2014) co-author Marion Sullivan
- Southern Biscuits, ISBN 978-1-4236-2176-8, Gibbs Smith; (2011) co-author Cynthia Graubart
- Nathalie Dupree’s Favorite Stories & Recipes, ISBN 978-1-4236-5250-2, Gibbs Smith; (2019)
