= Efia Nwangaza =

American activist and attorney

Personal details
- Born: Norfolk, Virginia, U.S.
- Party: Green
- Education: Spelman College; Temple University MA; Golden Gate University School of Law JD
- Occupation: Attorney

Efia Nwangaza (born 1951) is an American activist and attorney from South Carolina. Nwangaza was the Green Party's nominee in the 2004 United States Senate election in South Carolina.

== Early life, education and career ==
Nwangaza was raised in Norfolk, Virginia. She is a graduate of Spelman College, Temple University and Golden Gate University School of Law.

She has served as a staff attorney for the Greenville Legal Services Program, and is an independent attorney.

== Activism ==
Nwangaza founded and directs Greenville's Afrikan American Institute for Policy Studies, the Malcolm X Center for Self-Determination, and WMXP-LP community radio station. She has participated in numerous local, state and national protests, including the protest in the aftermath of the killing of Michael Brown.

Nwangaza is the past national co-chair of the Jericho Movement for Amnesty and Freedom of U.S. Political Prisoners, a member of the SNCC-Atlanta Project, the National Coalition of Blacks for Reparations in America, and the Coalition to Stop Police Brutality, Not In Our Name Project and Black Alliance for Peace.

Nwangaza worked on the campaign for a global demand for reparations at the United Nations World Conference Against Racism 2001.

== See also ==
- United States Senate election in South Carolina, 2004 2004 United States Senate elections
- The Jericho Movement
- Statement at 2nd Session of the Permanent Forum on People of African Descent
- List of African-American United States Senate candidates

Party political offices
Preceded by	Green nominee for U.S. Senator from South Carolina (Class 1); 2004	Incumbent
