= John Buse =

American academic

John B. Buse is the Verne S. Caviness Distinguished Professor of Medicine at the University of North Carolina School of Medicine (UNC). He is also the director of UNC's Diabetes Care Center and the North Carolina Translational and Clinical Sciences Institute. In 2008, he held the position of President, Medicine & Science on the board of the American Diabetes Association (ADA).

== Biography ==
Buse attended high school at Porter-Gaud School in Charleston, South Carolina. He received his bachelor's degree in biochemistry from Dartmouth College and his MD and PhD from Duke University. He completed his internship and residency in internal medicine and his fellowship in endocrinology at the University of Chicago. In 2019, Buse received the Outstanding Achievement in Clinical Diabetes Research Award from the ADA.
