= Thomas Schaller =

American political scientist (born 1967)

Thomas F. Schaller (born January 17, 1967) is Professor of Political Science at University of Maryland, Baltimore County (UMBC). He was a student of the State University of New York at Plattsburgh. Formerly a weekly political columnist for the Baltimore Sun, he has published commentaries in a variety of publications, including the New York Times, Washington Post, Boston Globe, Salon, The American Prospect and The Nation.

He is author of Whistling Past Dixie: How Democrats Can Win Without the South (ISBN 074329016X). He is also the author of The Stronghold: How Republicans Captured Congress but Surrendered the White House (Yale University, 2015) and "Common Enemies: Georgetown Basketball, Miami Football and the Racial Transformation of College Sports" (University of Nebraska Press, 2021), and White Rural Rage: The Threat to America’s Democracy (Penguin Random House, 2024). From 2009 to 2010, Schaller was a regular contributor to FiveThirtyEight.com.

He is of German and Italian descent.

During the 2000 presidential election, Schaller was listed as a Maryland state co-chair of GoreNet. GoreNet was a group that supported the Al Gore campaign with a focus on grassroots and online organizing as well as hosting small dollar donor events.
