= Unit supply specialist =

A unit supply specialist is a job title in the US Army that includes the "general upkeep" and maintenance of supplies and equipment. There are five skill levels. Training includes 8 weeks at Fort Gregg-Adams, Virginia.

== See also ==
- Military Occupational Specialty
