= The Herald (Rock Hill) =

Daily morning newspaper published in Rock Hill, South Carolina, in the United States

- Type: Daily newspaper
- Format: Broadsheet
- Owner: The McClatchy Company
- Founded: 1872 (as The Lantern)
- Headquarters: 132 W. Main St. Rock Hill, SC 29732; United States
- Circulation: 8,108 Daily; 9,954 Sunday (as of 2020)
- Price: USD 1 Monday-Saturday; USD 2 Sundays/Thanksgiving Day.
- Website: heraldonline.com

The Herald is a daily morning newspaper published in Rock Hill, South Carolina, in the United States. Its coverage is York, Chester, and Lancaster counties. In 1990, the paper was bought by The McClatchy Company of Sacramento, California. After McClatchy claimed bankruptcy in 2020, the paper was bought by Chatham Asset Management.

== History ==
The paper became a semi-weekly in 1893. In 1911, it was converted to a daily afternoon paper — except Sundays — and renamed The Evening Herald. That name and production schedule would endure for 75 years through several ownership changes.

In March 1985, the company was purchased by the News & Observer Co. of Raleigh, North Carolina, then owned by descendants of Josephus Daniels. The new owners changed the Saturday edition to morning and got rid of the Evening part of the name. In 1986, they launched a Sunday edition and two years later switched to morning publication seven days a week. In 1990, the Daniels family sold the paper to McClatchy. The purchase of The Herald and two other dailies in South Carolina — The Island Packet in Hilton Head, and The Beaufort Gazette of Beaufort—marked McClatchy's first foray into the Southern United States. The Herald was reunited with the N&O when McClatchy bought the Raleigh paper in 1995.

McClatchy's purchase of most of Knight Ridder's properties, finalized in June 2006, made The Herald a sister publication of its longtime rival, The Charlotte Observer. The papers plan to remain separate, and the publisher of the Observer has said the paper has no plans to close its Rock Hill bureau.

On November 7, 2007, it was announced that Valerie Canepa, publisher of the Herald for the past four and a half years, would be moving to Columbus, Georgia, to become publisher of the Columbus Ledger-Enquirer. At the same time it was also announced that Debbie Abels, 34-year veteran of The Charlotte Observer, would take over as publisher beginning November 26, 2007. Debbie Abels will also report to the publisher of The Charlotte Observer, Ann Caulkins, instead of the McClatchy Regional Vice President as Canepa did.

In February 2009, it was announced that as of March 2, the Herald would be going to a regional printing arrangement, in which the newspaper would be printed on The Charlotte Observer's presses in NC.

In February 2016, it was announced that Angela Joines, a 20-year veteran of The News & Observer (Raleigh, NC) would take over as General Manager/Advertising Director, filling vacancy left by former publisher, Debbie Abel's retirement in December 2015.

In July 2024, the newspaper announced it will decrease print publication days to three a week, Wednesdays, Fridays and Sundays. The paper will also transition from carrier to postal delivery.

Jim Hoagland, a nationally syndicated columnist for The Washington Post and a winner of the Pulitzer Prize, began his career working summers at The Evening Herald.

== See also ==
- List of newspapers in South Carolina
