= Jim DeMint =

American politician (born 1951)

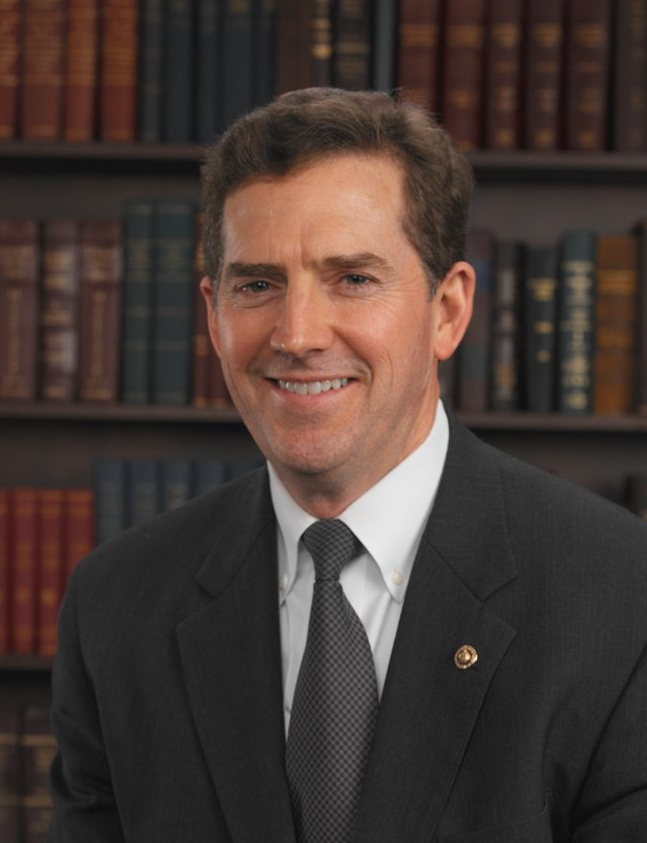
- Official portrait, 2005

President of the Heritage Foundation
- In office April 4, 2013 – May 2, 2017
- Preceded by: Edwin Feulner
- Succeeded by: Edwin Feulner

United States Senator from South Carolina
- In office January 3, 2005 – January 2, 2013
- Preceded by: Fritz Hollings
- Succeeded by: Tim Scott

Member of the U.S. House of Representatives from South Carolina's 4th district
- In office January 3, 1999 – January 3, 2005
- Preceded by: Bob Inglis
- Succeeded by: Bob Inglis

Personal details
- Born: James Warren DeMint; September 2, 1951 (age 75) Greenville, South Carolina, U.S.
- Party: Republican
- Spouse: Debbie Henderson (m. 1973)
- Children: 4
- Education: University of Tennessee (BA); Clemson University (MBA)
- DeMint's voice DeMint on the importance of ideas in his Senate farewell speech. Recorded December 20, 2012

James Warren DeMint (born September 2, 1951) is an American businessman, author, and retired politician who served as a United States senator from South Carolina and as president of The Heritage Foundation. A leading figure in the Tea Party movement, DeMint is a member of the Republican Party and is the founder of the Senate Conservatives Fund.

DeMint served as the United States representative for South Carolina's 4th congressional district from 1999 to 2005. He was elected to the U.S. Senate from South Carolina in 2004 and reelected in 2010. DeMint served in the Senate until January 2, 2013, when he stepped down to become president of The Heritage Foundation. On May 2, 2017, DeMint resigned his position at Heritage at the request of its board. He later became a senior advisor to Citizens for Self-Governance and the founding chairman of the Conservative Partnership Institute.

== Early life and education ==
DeMint was born in Greenville, South Carolina, one of four children. His parents, Betty W. (née Rawlings) and Thomas Eugene DeMint, divorced when he was five years old. Following the divorce, Betty DeMint operated a dance studio out of the family's home.

DeMint attended Christ Church Episcopal School and Wade Hampton High School. He played drums for a cover band called Salt & Pepper. He received a bachelor's degree in 1973 from the University of Tennessee, where he is a member of the Tennessee Kappa chapter of Sigma Alpha Epsilon fraternity, and received an MBA in 1981 from Clemson University.

== Early career ==
DeMint joined his father-in-law's advertising firm in Greenville in 1981, working in the field of market research. In 1983, he founded The DeMint Group, a research firm with businesses, schools, colleges, and hospitals as clients.

== U.S. House of Representatives ==
=== Elections ===
DeMint's first involvement in politics began in 1992, when he was hired by Republican Representative Bob Inglis to work on his campaign for South Carolina's Fourth Congressional District. Inglis defeated three-term incumbent Democrat Liz J. Patterson, and DeMint performed message-testing and marketing for Inglis through two more successful elections.

In 1998, Inglis ran for the U.S. Senate instead of seeking re-election to the House of Representatives. DeMint left his firm to run for Inglis' House seat. The district was considered the most Republican in the state, and it was understood that whoever won the primary would be heavily favored to be the district's next congressman. DeMint finished second in the Republican primary behind State Senator and fellow Greenville resident Michael Fair. In the runoff, DeMint narrowly defeated Fair by 2,030 votes. He then defeated Democratic State Senator Glenn Reese with 57 percent of the vote to Reese's 40 percent. DeMint faced no major-party opposition in 2000, and defeated an underfunded Democrat in 2002.

=== Tenure ===
DeMint was elected president of the freshman class of House Republicans. DeMint pledged to serve only three terms in the House.

The Washington Post and The Christian Post have described DeMint as a "staunch conservative", based on his actions during his time in the House. He broke rank with his party and powerful state interests several times: DeMint was one of 34 Republicans to oppose President Bush's No Child Left Behind program and one of 25 to oppose Medicare Part D. He sought to replace No Child Left Behind with a state-based block-grant program for schools. DeMint also worked to privatize Social Security by allowing the creation of individual investment accounts in the federal program. In 2003, DeMint sponsored legislation to allow people under the age of 55 to set aside 3 percent to 8 percent of their Social Security withholding income in personal investment accounts. DeMint was also the only South Carolina House member to vote for normalizing trade relations with China, arguing in favor of free trade between the countries. He also provided a crucial swing vote on a free trade bill regarding Caribbean countries. His votes led South Carolina's influential textile industry to heavily oppose him in his subsequent House and Senate races.

== U.S. Senate ==
=== 2004 election ===
DeMint declared his candidacy for the Senate on December 12, 2002, after Sen. Ernest Hollings announced that he would retire after the 2004 elections. DeMint was the White House's preferred candidate in the Republican primary.

In the Republican primary on June 8, 2004, DeMint placed a distant second, 10.3% behind former governor David Beasley and just barely ahead of Thomas Ravenel. Ravenel endorsed DeMint in the following runoff. DeMint won the runoff handily, however.

DeMint then faced Democratic state education superintendent Inez Tenenbaum in the November general election. DeMint led Tenenbaum through much of the campaign and ultimately defeated her by 9.6 percentage points. DeMint's win meant that South Carolina was represented by two Republican senators for the first time since Reconstruction, when Thomas J. Robertson and John J. Patterson served together as senators.

DeMint stirred controversy during debates with Tenenbaum when he stated his belief that openly gay people should not be allowed to teach in public schools. When questioned by reporters, DeMint also stated that single mothers who live with their boyfriends should similarly be excluded from being educators. He later apologized for making the remarks, saying they were "distracting from the main issues of the debate." He also noted that these were opinions based on his personal values, not issues he would or could deal with as a member of Congress.

=== 2010 election ===
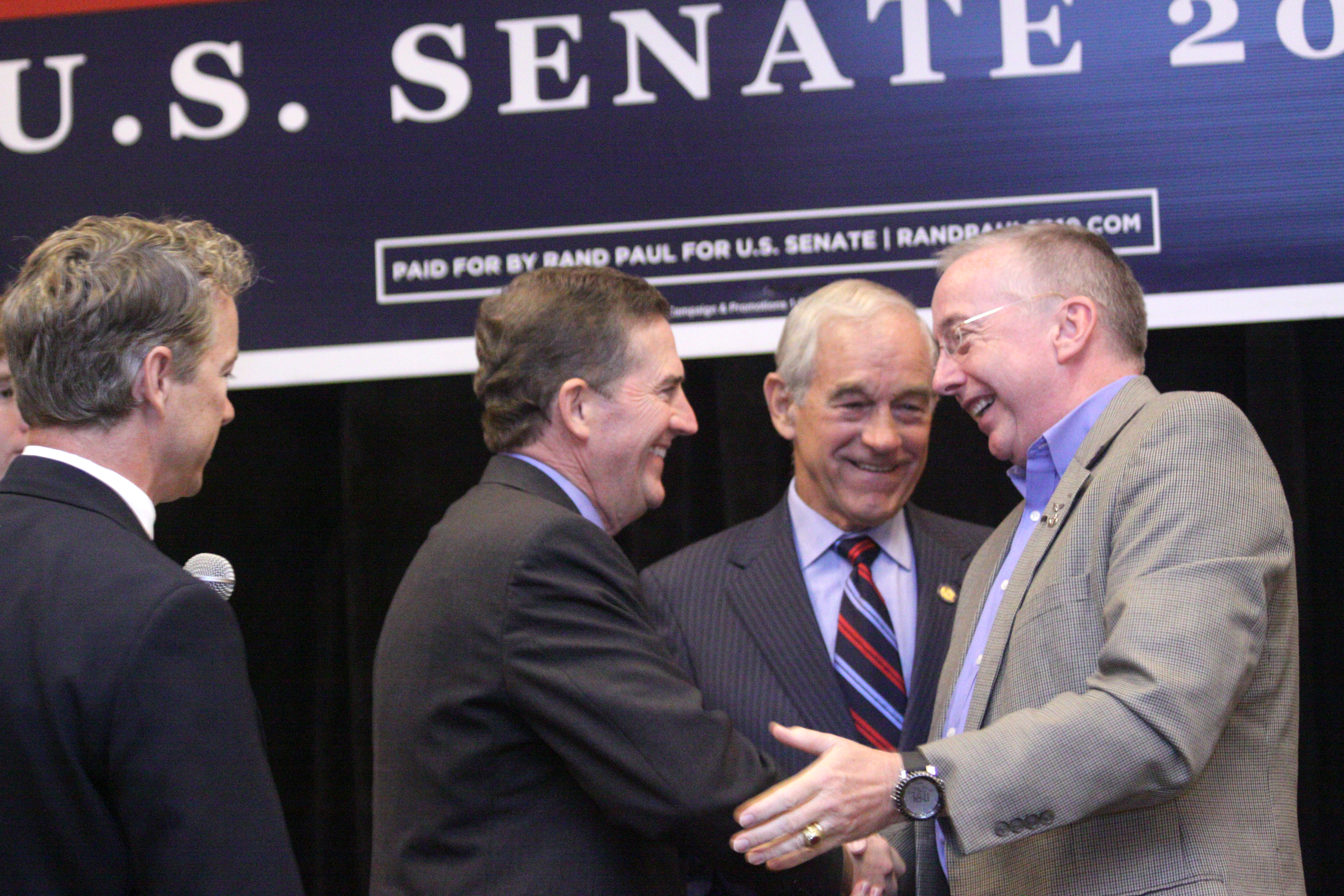
DeMint campaigning in Erlanger, Kentucky with Congressman Ron Paul of Texas and Congressman Geoff Davis of Kentucky on behalf of Rand Paul in 2010

DeMint easily won re-nomination in the Republican Party primary. Democratic Party opponent Alvin Greene won an upset primary victory over Vic Rawl. Greene received scrutiny from Democratic Party officials, with some calling for Greene to withdraw his candidacy or be replaced on the ballot. DeMint, largely campaigned outside South Carolina for Republican Senate candidates identified with the Tea Party. Diverse media outlets frequently referred to DeMint as a party "kingmaker" for supporting successful primary challengers to mainstream Republican candidates. On November 2, 2010, DeMint defeated Greene by a margin of 63% to 28%, with Green Party candidate Tom Clements receiving 9% of the vote.

=== Tenure ===
In his first term, DeMint was appointed to the Commerce, Science and Transportation Committee, the Environment and Public Works Committee, the Joint Economic Committee, and the Special Committee on Aging. In 2006, DeMint began leading the Senate Steering Committee. DeMint also served as a member of the Committee on Foreign Relations and the Committee on Commerce, Science, and Transportation.

As a member of the 111th Congress, DeMint joined the United States Senate Committee on Banking, Housing, and Urban Affairs. In 2009, DeMint was one of two senators who voted against Hillary Clinton's appointment to Secretary of State, and the next year he introduced legislation to completely repeal the Patient Protection and Affordable Care Act, commonly referred to as Obamacare. Later in 2010, he introduced another piece of legislation titled the Regulations from the Executive in Need of Scrutiny, which aimed to require congressional approval of any major regulation change made by a federal agency. At the end of his first term, DeMint was appointed to the Senate Impeachment Trial Committee for the impeachment of federal judge Thomas Porteous.

After winning re-election in 2010, DeMint became the highest-ranking elected official associated with the Tea Party. During the first year of his second term, DeMint released a letter signed by over 30 other Senate Republicans asking the supercommittee tasked with balancing the federal budget to do so within the next 10 years, and without creating any net tax increases.

In 2012, DeMint announced his resignation from the Senate effective January 2, 2013, to take a job as president of The Heritage Foundation. On December 17, 2012, South Carolina governor Nikki Haley announced that she would name Congressman Tim Scott to fill DeMint's vacated seat.

== Political positions ==
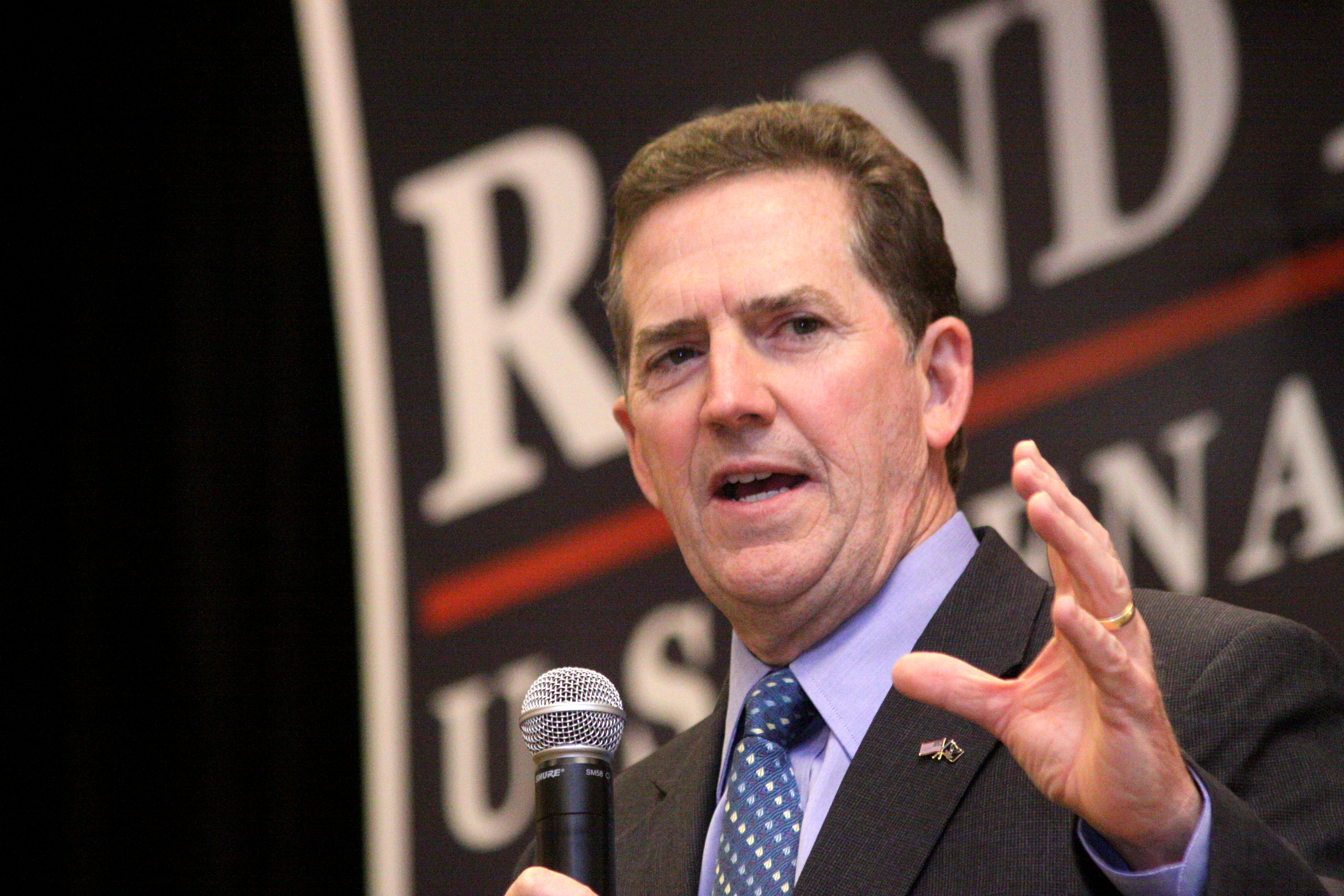
DeMint speaking at rally for United States Senate candidate Rand Paul in October 2010

DeMint is a member of the Republican Party and is aligned with the Tea Party movement. In 2011, DeMint was identified by Salon as one of the most conservative members of the Senate.

=== Economy and budget ===
Throughout his political career, DeMint has supported a type of tax reform that would replace the federal income tax with a national sales tax and has favored abolishing the Internal Revenue Service. He has supported many changes to federal spending, such as prioritizing a balanced budget amendment instead of increasing the national debt limit. As a senator, DeMint proposed a two-year earmark ban to prevent members of Congress from spending federal money on projects in their home states. In 2008, presidential candidates John McCain, Hillary Clinton, and Barack Obama co-sponsored DeMint's earmark reform proposal, although it ultimately failed to pass in the Senate. In March 2010, DeMint's earmark reform plans were again defeated. In November of the same year, DeMint, along with nine other senators including Rand Paul and Marco Rubio, proposed another moratorium on earmarks which was adopted by Senate Republicans.

DeMint has also been a proponent of free trade agreements, advocated for the privatization of Social Security benefits, and in 2009 authored the "Health Care Freedom Plan", which proposed giving tax credits to those who are unable to afford health insurance. DeMint opposed President Barack Obama's health care reform efforts, saying of the Affordable Care Act, "If we're able to stop Obama on this it will be his Waterloo. It will break him."

DeMint was the sole 'Nay' vote for the Post-9/11 Veterans Educational Assistance Act of 2008.

DeMint was opposed to the Emergency Economic Stabilization Act of 2008 and the bailouts during the automotive industry crisis of 2008–2010. He also led a group of senators in opposing government loans to corporations. He supports a high level of government accountability through the auditing of federal agencies.

=== Foreign policy ===
In 1999, DeMint voted against the NATO intervention during the Kosovo war. DeMint voted to authorize military force in Iraq in 2002. In 2011, DeMint voted in favor of Rand Paul's resolution opposing military involvement in Libya. He favored preventing Iran from developing nuclear weapons over a policy of containment after their development.

DeMint has also expressed concern about various United Nations treaties, such as the Convention on the Rights of Persons with Disabilities and the Law of the Sea Treaty. DeMint favors legal immigration and opposes granting amnesty to illegal immigrants. He has expressed opposition to the Border Security, Economic Opportunity, and Immigration Modernization Act of 2013 on the basis that granting amnesty to illegal immigrants may cost American taxpayers trillions of dollars.

In a May 15, 2020, editorial in Newsweek, DeMint stated that while he continued to support free trade, he was wrong about liberalizing trade with China.

=== Obama administration ===
In October 2009, after the Honduran Army, on orders from the Honduran Supreme Court, removed Manuel Zelaya as president, DeMint visited the country to gather information. The trip was approved by Senate Minority Leader Mitch McConnell but opposed by Foreign Relations Committee Chairman John Kerry. DeMint supported the new government, while the Obama administration favored Zelaya's return to the presidency.

In late 2009, DeMint criticized Barack Obama for waiting eight months into his first term as president before nominating a new head of the Transportation Security Administration. After the attempted bombing of Northwest Flight 253 in December 2009, DeMint stated that President Obama had not put enough focus on terrorism while in office.

DeMint blamed Obama for racism in the United States. He said that Obama "took race back to the '60s, as far as I'm concerned. He made everything a race issue, or at least saw it through a racial lens. The country had moved toward bending over backward to create equality. But then suddenly, with Obama, he just lit the fires. I thought when he was elected that was the big victory, that we had put racism behind us."

=== Social issues ===
DeMint opposes abortion in all cases except for when the woman's life is in danger and opposing research from stem cells derived from human embryos.

DeMint voted against the Affordable Care Act (also known as Obamacare) in December 2009. He also voted against the Health Care and Education Reconciliation Act of 2010.

He voted in favor of declaring English the official language of the US government.

DeMint is firmly opposed to same-sex marriage. In his book Now or Never: Saving America from Economic Collapse, DeMint states:

Does government have the right to reshape cultural mores by redefining religious institutions to sanction behavior that is considered immoral by all the world's religions? In America, people should have a right to live with whomever they want, but redefining marriage to promote behavior that is deemed costly and destructive is not the proper role of government.

DeMint also argues that same-sex marriage infringes upon religious liberty:

We just cannot have, particularly the federal government, redefining marriage or telling us what is right or wrong. And if we help America understand that, folks, we're not trying to get the government to do it our way or your way; what we're asking for is the freedom to allow people to live out their faith and values and their lives the way they want. And we believe that our side will win because I'm convinced that most Americans want to have decent moral lives and share our same values. But if the government continues to press in the wrong direction, it begins to change our culture.

DeMint has repeatedly voted for a constitutional amendment banning same-sex marriage. He has also voted to ban same-sex adoption in Washington, D.C. DeMint drew considerable criticism by saying that openly gay teachers should be banned from teaching in public schools.

In a 2008 interview, DeMint said that while government does not have the right to restrict homosexuality, it also should not encourage it through legalizing same-sex marriage, due to the "costly secondhand consequences" to society from the prevalence of certain diseases among homosexuals. On October 1, 2010, DeMint, in comments that echoed what he had said in 2004, told a rally of his supporters that openly homosexual and unmarried sexually active people should not be teachers. In response, the National Organization for Women, the National Education Association, the gay rights group Human Rights Campaign, GOProud (a GOP group), and the National Gay and Lesbian Task Force asked for DeMint's apology.

== Later career ==
=== Senate Conservatives Fund ===
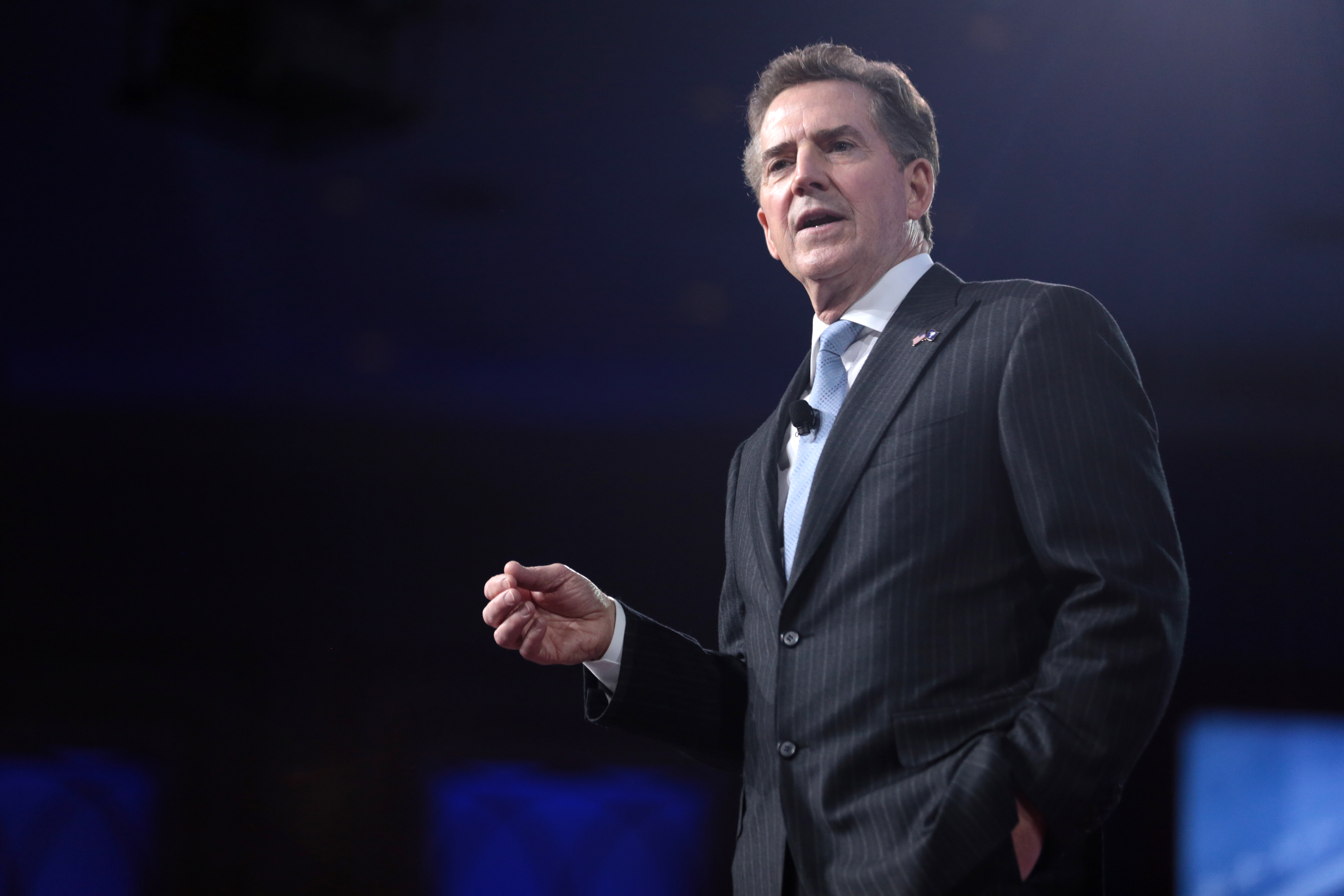
DeMint speaking at Conservative Political Action Conference in 2017

In 2008, DeMint formed the Senate Conservatives Fund (SCF), a political action committee with the intention of supporting conservative candidates that may have otherwise been overlooked by the national party. The SCF is associated with the Tea Party movement. It supports conservative Republican politicians in primary challenges and general elections. SCF states that it raised $9.1 million toward the 2010 U.S. Senate elections and which endorsed successful first-time Senate candidates Pat Toomey, Rand Paul, Mike Lee, Ron Johnson, Marco Rubio. DeMint left SCF in 2012.

=== The Heritage Foundation ===
On April 4, 2013, DeMint started his first full day as president of The Heritage Foundation. The Washington Post reported that DeMint's predecessor at the Heritage Foundation, Edwin Feulner, was paid a base salary of $477,097 in 2010 compared to a U.S. Senator's salary of $174,000 and that year DeMint was one of the poorest members of the Senate, with an estimated wealth of $40,501.

On May 2, 2017, DeMint was fired from The Heritage Foundation following a unanimous vote of the foundation's board of trustees, which had lost confidence in his ability to maintain the organization's role as a fount of conservative thinking. A public statement by the board said a thorough investigation of the foundation's operations under DeMint found "significant and worsening management issues that led to a breakdown of internal communications and cooperation." "While the organization has seen many successes," the board statement said, "Jim DeMint and a handful of his closest advisers failed to resolve these problems."

=== Citizens for Self-Governance ===
In June 2017, DeMint became a senior advisor to Citizens for Self-Governance, a group which is seeking to call a convention to propose amendments to the United States Constitution in order to reduce federal government spending and power. According to DeMint, "The Tea Party needs a new mission. They realize that all the work they did in 2010 has not resulted in all the things they hoped for. Many of them are turning to Article V." The proposed constitutional convention would impose fiscal restraint on Washington D.C., reduce the federal government's authority over states, and impose term limits on federal officials.

=== Conservative Partnership Institute ===
In 2017, DeMint founded the Conservative Partnership Institute, of which he serves as chairman. The stated purpose of the CPI is the professional development of conservative staffers and elected officials. Mark Meadows joined as senior partner in January 2021. The Save America PAC donated $1 million to the CPI. A 2022 NPR investigation found CPI might be violating prohibitions on 501(c)(3) charities providing benefits to political parties (in this case, the Republican Party).

=== 2020 election results ===
As part of the attempts to overturn the 2020 United States presidential election, DeMint signed a December 10, 2020, letter from the Conservative Action Project asking state legislatures in the battleground states of Pennsylvania, Arizona, Georgia, Wisconsin, Nevada, and Michigan to disregard the popular vote outcomes in each of those states and appoint slates of electors to the Electoral College in support of President Donald Trump.

== Personal life ==
DeMint's wife, Debbie, is one of three children of the late Greenville advertising entrepreneur and South Carolina Republican figure James Marvin Henderson Sr.

== Works ==
- Why We Whisper: Restoring Our Right to Say It's Wrong, with J. David Woodard. Rowman & Littlefield. 2007.
- Saving Freedom: We Can Stop America's Slide Into Socialism. Fidelis. 2009. ISBN 978-0-8054-4957-0.
- The Great American Awakening: Two Years that Changed America, Washington, and Me. B&H Books. 2011. ISBN 978-1-4336-7279-8.
- Now or Never: Saving America from Economic Collapse. Center Street, 2012.
- Falling in Love With America Again Center Street, 2014.
- Satan's Dare. Fidelis. 2021. ISBN 978-1735856315.

U.S. House of Representatives
Preceded by Bob Inglis	Member of the U.S. House of Representatives from South Carolina's 4th congressional district 1999–2005	Succeeded by Bob Inglis
Party political offices
Preceded by Bob Inglis	Republican nominee for U.S. Senator from South Carolina (Class 3); 2004, 2010	Succeeded by Tim Scott
Preceded by Jeff Sessions	Chair of the Senate Republican Steering Committee; 2007–2012	Succeeded by Pat Toomey
U.S. Senate
Preceded by Ernest Hollings	U.S. Senator (Class 3) from South Carolina; 2005–2013; Served alongside: Lindsey Graham	Succeeded by Tim Scott
U.S. order of precedence (ceremonial)
Preceded by Tom Udall as Former U.S. Senator	Order of precedence of the United States	Succeeded by Lincoln Chafee as Former U.S. Senator
