= List of women from South Carolina =

State flag of South Carolina

Location of South Carolina in the U.S. map

The following is a list of prominent women who were born in the U.S. state of South Carolina, lived in South Carolina, or for whom South Carolina is a significant part of their identity.

== A–E ==
- Fannie Phelps Adams, (1917-2016), born in Columbia, SC; educator and activist
- Mattie Jean Adams, (1873-1947), born in Utopia; author and women's rights activist; first woman to graduate from South Carolina College
- Kimberly Aiken (born 1975), born in Columbia; Miss America 1994
- Jaimie Alexander (born 1984), born in Greenville; actress, Kyle XY, Blindspot, the Thor movies
- Sarah Campbell Allan (1861-1954), born in Charleston; first female doctor in the state of South Carolina
- Dorothy Earlene Allison (1949-2024), born in Greenville; author
- Maria Frances Avery
- Maria Martin Bachman (1796-1863), born in Charleston; watercolor painter and scientific illustrator
- Ada White Bacot (1832-1911), born in Darlington District; Confederate nurse
- Augusta Braxton Baker (1911-1998), born in Baltimore, and worked in New York, but retired to South Carolina; Storyteller-in-Residence position at the University of South Carolina
- Anna DeCosta Banks (1869-1930), born in Charleston; nurse
- Annie Maria Barnes (1857 – unknown), born in Columbia; journalist, editor, and author
- Frances Elizabeth Barrow (1822–1894), born in Charleston; children's writer
- Margaret Catherine Moore Barry (1752-1823), born in County Antrim, Ireland; scout and guide during the American Revolutionary War
- Eleanor Beardsley born in Columbia; journalist and correspondent for NPR
- Linda Bell (epidemiologist)
- Mary McLeod Bethune (1875–1955), from Mayesville; civil rights leader and groundbreaking educator
- Betsey (gynecology)
- Gwen Bristow (1903-1980), born in Marion, SC; writer and journalist
- Crandall Close Bowles (born 1947) in Fort Mill; businesswoman
- Blanche McCrary Boyd (born 1945), in Charleston; novelist
- Laura Bragg (1891-1978), born in Massachusetts, lived in Charleston; first woman to run a publicly funded art museum in the US
- Laura Brodie (1908-2004), born at Rockwood Farm, near Leesville, SC; herpetologist
- Danielle Brooks (born 1989), raised in Simpsonville; actress
- Lucy Hughes Brown (1863-1911), born in Mebane, NC; SC's first African American female physician
- Floride Calhoun (1792–1866), born in Charleston; Second Lady of the United States
- Anna Camp (born 1982), born in Aiken; actress, The Help
- Sarah Flournoy Moore Chapin (1830-1896), born in Charleston; author and temperance worker
- Marshall Chapman (born 1949) in Spartanburg; singer-songwriter, author
- Martha Marshall Chapman, II (born 1949) in Spartanburg; musician
- Mary Boykin Chesnut (1823-1886) born near Stateburg, SC; diarist
- Arney Childs; author, Dean of Women at USC
- Alice Childress (1920–1994), born in Charleston; playwright who wrote about the struggles of poverty and racism
- Cema Sitton Chreitzberg (1888-1972) born in Autun, Anderson County; founder of the Bethlehem Center in Spartanburg
- Abigail Mandana Holmes Christensen (c. 1852-1938), born in Massachusetts, moved to South Carolina; collector of folklore
- Georgia Alden Cleveland (1851-1914), born in Laurensville, Georgia, lived in Spartanburg; writer, activist
- Elizabeth Clotworthy; Dean of Women at USC
- Catherine Coleman (born 1960), born in Charleston; chemist, former U.S. Air Force officer, current NASA astronaut
- Monique Coleman (born 1980), born in Orangeburg; actress
- Affra Harleston Coming (c. 1651-1698) pioneer in SC
- Angell Conwell (born 1983), born in Orangeburg and raised in Columbia; actress
- Madelyn Cline (born 1997), born in Goose Creek; actress
- Ann Pamela Cunningham (1816-1875), born on Rosemont Plantation; preservationist who founded The Mount Vernon Ladies' Association
- Ida Jane Dacus (1875-1964), born in Williamston; librarian
- Esther Dale (1885–1961), born in Beaufort; actress
- Beth Daniel (born 1956), born in Charleston; golfer, member of World Golf Hall of Fame
- Kristin Davis (born 1965), early in her childhood, she and her parents moved to Columbia; actress known for role as Charlotte York in Sex and the City
- Mary Elizabeth Moragne Davis (1815–1903), born in Oakwood, Abbeville District; diarist and author
- Viola Davis (born 1965), born in St. Matthews; actress, The Help
- Cara Delay
- Anna Peyre Dinnies (1805–1886), born in Georgetown; poet and writer
- Eugenia Thomas Slade Duke creator of Duke's mayonnaise
- Pam Durban (born 1947) in Aiken; novelist and short story writer
- Ainsley Earhardt (born 1976), grew up in Columbia, correspondent for Fox News
- Charity Adams Earley (1918-2002), born in Kittrell, NC, grew up in Columbia, SC; first African American woman to become an officer in the Women's Army Auxiliary Crops
- Marian Wright Edelman (born 1939), born in Bennettsville, activist for the rights of children
- Frances Ravenel Smythe Edmunds (1916-2019), born in Charleston; preservationist
- Leslie Jean Egnot (born 1963), born in Greenville, Olympic yachtswoman for New Zealand
- Irene Dillard Elliot (1892-1978), born in Laurens County; first female full professor and first female dean at USC
- Mary Gordon Ellis (1889-1934), born in Gourdin, SC; fist woman elected to the SC legislature
- Lilian Ellison (1923–2007), born in Kershaw County, female professional wrestler better known as the Fabulous Moolah
- Emily Plume Evans (1865-1942), born in Newark, NJ, moved to Spartanburg; activist and club woman
- Matilda Arabella Evans (1866-1935), born in Aiken; first African American woman licensed to practice medicine in SC

== F–J ==
- Shannon Faulkner (born 1975), born in Powdersville, the first female cadet to enter The Citadel
- Mary Latimer Gambrell (1889-1974), born in Belton, SC; president of Hunter College of New York; named building on campus of USC
- Mamie Garvin Fields (1888-1987), born in Charleston; teacher, civil rights and religious advocate, and memoirist
- Ruby Middleton Forsythe (1905-1992), born in Charleston; educator
- Grace Beacham Freeman (1916-2002), born in Spartanburg; poet, columnist short story writer, and educator
- Nancy Friday (1933–2017), grew up in Charleston, author, specializing in topics of female sexuality and liberation
- Susan Pringle Frost (1873-1960), born in Charleston; preservationist
- Love Gantt (1875-1935), born in Camden; physician
- Sarah Ann Haynsworth Gayle (1804-1835), born in Sumter County, diarist
- Emily Geiger (1765-1825), burn in Zurich, Switzerland, settled in Saxe Gotha; Patriot messenger during the American Revolutionary War
- Frances Guignard Gibbes (1870-1948), born in Columbia; first woman to enroll at South Carolina College
- Leeza Gibbons (born 1957), born in Hartsville, talk show host of Entertainment Tonight and other Hollywood news shows
- Rose Delores Gibbs (born 1946) in Moncks Corner; first female African American doctor to graduate from the Medical University of South Carolina, and the first black woman to serve as the chief medical officer in the Peace Corps
- Althea Gibson (1927–2003), born in Silver, Clarendon County, first African-American player to win Wimbledon and U.S. National tennis championships
- Lottie Gibson (1930-2016), born in Seneca; social activist
- Caroline Howard Gilman (1794-1888), born in Boston, moved to Charleston; author and advocate for slavery
- Vivian Glover (born 1947) in Orangeburg, NC, worked at Claflin University; writer, educator
- Lucile Godbold (1900-1981), born in Marion County, SC; track and field athlete
- Janie Glymph Goree (1921-2009), born in Newberry County; first female African-American to be elected mayor in South Carolina
- K. Lee Graham (born 1997), from Chapin, won the Miss Teen USA 2014 pageant
- Wil Lou Gray (1884-1984), born in Laurens County; educator
- Laura Ann Grey
- Mary Putnam Gridley (1850-1939), born in Hillston, Massachusetts, but lived in Greenville, SC; first female president of a cotton mill in SC
- Angelina Grimké (1805-1879), raised in Charleston, lived in New Jersey; abolitionist, political activist, suffragist
- Sarah Moore Grimké (1792-1873), born in Charleston; abolitionist, writer, feminist
- Jane Bruce Guignard (1876-1963), born in Aiken County; physician, suffragist, and philanthropist
- Nikki Haley (born 1972), born and raised in Bamberg, Indian-American politician, former Governor of South Carolina (2010–2017), and United States Ambassador to the United Nations since 2017
- Shanola Hampton (born 1977), from Charleston, actress, on Showtime series Shameless
- Harriet Hancock Founded SC PFLAG, the first LGBTQ rights organization in SC, and helped to organize the first Pride march
- Emily Jane Liles Harris (1827-1899), lived in Spartanburg; farmer and writer
- Fanny Stanley Harris
- Esther Hill Hawks (1833-1906), born in Hooksett, New Hampshire, worked in Beaufort, SC; teacher, doctor, activist
- Katherine Heyward first female department head at USC
- Lauren Michelle Hill (born 1979), from Columbia, model, actress, Playboy Playmate
- Sophia Hume (1702-1774); author and preacher
- Josephine Humphreys (born 1945), from Charleston, author
- Samantha Hunter - First Black Miss SC Pride, drag queen and AIDS activist. There is a chapter on Hunter in Jim Sears' Rebels, Rubyfruit, Rhinestones
- Alberta Charlayne Hunter-Gault (born 1942), in Due West, SC; civil rights activist, journalist, former foreign correspondent for NPR
- Fiona Hutchison (born 1960), raised in Columbia and attended Clemson University, soap opera actress
- Lauren Hutton (born 1943), from Charleston, supermodel, actress
- Madison Iseman (born 1997), from Myrtle Beach, actress
- Sylvia Jefferies (born 1969), born in Greenwood, actress, Nashville
- Melissa Jefferson-Wooden (born 2001), born in Georgetown, Olympic gold and bronze medalist in track
- Caroline Howard Jervey (1823–1877), born in Charleston, author and poet
- Harriet Catherine Frazier Johnson (1889-1972), born in Pelzer; first woman ever elected to the South Carolina House of Representatives
- Alexis Jordan (born 1992), born in Columbia, R&B and pop singer
- Mary Camilla Judson (1874-1910) Lady Principle of Greenville Woman's College

== K–P ==
- Clara Louise Kellogg (1842-1916) born in Sumterville, SC; opera singer
- Betsy King (born 1955), from Spartanburg, golfer, member of World Golf Hall of Fame
- Marie Kirkpatrick
- Eartha Kitt (1927–2008), actress, singer, and cabaret star
- Sallie Krawcheck (born 1964), from Charleston, former chairman and chief executive officer of Citi Global Wealth Management
- Emma LeConte
- Mary Elizabeth Lee (1813–1849), born in Charleston, writer
- Nina Littlejohn (1879-1963), born in Cherokee County; African American entrepreneur and health care advocate
- Martha Daniell Logan (1704-1779), born in St. Thomas Parish, SC; botanist
- LZ Love
- Lucy (genecology)
- Grace Lumpkin (1891-1980), born in Milledgeville, Georgia, moved to SC; writer, novelist
- Mother Mary Baptista Aloysius Lynch (1826–1887), born in Ireland, lived in Charleston; founding superior of the Ursuline community in Columbia
- Andie MacDowell (born 1958), born in Gaffney, model and actress
- Judith Giton Manigault (c. 1665-1711) born in La Voulte, Languedoc, France; immigrant, matriarch
- Allison Marsh born in Richmond, Virginia, lives in Columbia; public historian of technology
- Madame Ann Marson (Mason) Talvande
- Leah McClimans
- Catherine Mae McKee McCottry (1921-2018), born in Charlotte, NC; first female African American obstetrician and gynecologist in Charleston, South Carolina
- Annie Virginia McCracken (1868–?), born in Charleston; published a magazine while living in Summerville
- Carrie Allen McCray (1913-2008), born in Lynchburg, Virginia, but lived in Columbia; African American writer
- Grace McFadden (died 2004); first black female professor at the University of South Carolina's College of Humanities and Social Sciences
- Clelia Peronneau Mathewes McGowan (1865-1956); activist and politician
- Nina Mae McKinney (1912-1967) born in Lancaster; actress and singer
- Marian McKnight (born 1936), born in Manning, Miss America 1957, actress, producer and writer
- Patina Miller (born 1984), born in Pageland, actress, singer, Madam Secretary, All My Children, The Hunger Games: Mockingjay films
- Vanessa Minnillo (born 1980), from Charleston, television personality on Entertainment Tonight
- Mary Alice Monroe (born in Evanston, Illinois, resides in South Carolina; author
- Darla Moore (born 1954), born in Lake City, financial executive
- Julianne Morris (born 1968), born in Columbia, actress, Days of Our Lives
- Rebecca Brewton Motte (1737-1815), born in Charleston; patriot and plantation owner
- Barbara Wischan Moxon (born 1921) in Philadelphia, moved to Columbia; served on the SC Commission on Women
- Allison Munn (born 1974), grew up in Columbia, actress
- Ellen Murray (abolitionist) (1834-1908) born in Saint John, New Brunswick, lived in Beaufort; abolitionist, educator, and founder of the Penn School on St. Helena Island
- Elaine Nichols (born 1941) in Charlotte, NC; Supervisory Curator of Culture at the Smithsonian Institution National Museum of African American History and Culture (NMAAHC)
- Amy Surginer Northrop (1905-2010) born in West Columbia; cosmetologist
- Nancy O'Dell (born 1966), born in Sumter, TV personality, Access Hollywood and Entertainment Tonight
- Mary Simms Oliphant (1891-1988); historian
- Peggy Parish (1927–1988), born in Manning, author of Amelia Bedelia series
- Lu Parker, broadcast journalist and Miss USA 1994, from Anderson
- Mary-Louise Parker, film and television actress, born in Fort Jackson
- Teyonah Parris (born 1987), born in Hopkins, actress, Mad Men, WandaVision
- Liz J. Patterson (1939-2018), born in Columbia; politician
- Marian Baxter Paul (1897-1980), born in Georgetown County; public health official
- Phoebe Pember (1823-1913), born in Charleston; nurse and administer of Chimborazo Hospital in Richmond, VA
- James M. Perry (lawyer) (1894-1964), born in Greenville; first female lawyer in SC
- Mattie Elmina Perry (1868-1957) born at Cheohee, Oconee County; ran the Elhanan orphanage and school for poor children in Marion, NC
- Julia Peterkin (1880–1961), born in Laurens County, Pulitzer Prize winner
- Bobbie Phillips (born 1972), actress, The Cape, Murder One
- Maria Henrietta Pinckney (1782-1836), born in Charleston; political writer
- Anita Lily Pollitzer (1894-1975), born in Charleston; photographer and suffragist
- Carrie Teller Pollitzer (1881-1974), born in Charleston, South Carolina; educator, suffragist
- Mabel Pollitzer (1885-1979), born in Charleston; educator, suffragist
- Louisa Bouknight Poppenheim (1866-1957), born in Charleston, South Carolina; clubwoman
- Virginia Postrel (born 1960), political and cultural writer, born in Greenville
- Elizabeth Waties Pringle (1845-1921) born near Pawleys Island; plantation owner and writer

== Q–Z ==
- Beatrice Witte Ravenel (1870-1956), born in Charleston; poet
- Harriott Horry Ravenel (1832-1912), born in Charleston; writer
- Dorcas Nelson Richardson (c. 1741-1834); Revolutionary War heroine
- Eudora Ramsay Richardson (1891-1973),born in Versailles, Kentucky, worked in Greenville; suffragist, lecturer, and writer
- Alexandra Ripley (1934-2004), born in Charleston; writer
- Sharon Risher American clergywoman and anti-gun violence activist
- Becci Robbins Writer and longtime organizer of G.R.O.W. and the Progressive Network
- Jane Robelot (born 1960), in Greenville, Co Anchor CBS This Morning
- Julie Roberts (born 1979), from Lancaster, country music singer
- Charlotte M. Rollin (c. 1847-1928), born in Charleston; political and civil rights activist
- Louisa Rollin (born 1858), born in Charleston; feminist and civil rights activist
- Mackenzie Rosman (born 1989), born in Charleston, actress, 7th Heaven
- Eulalie Chafee Salley (1883-1975), born in Augusta, Georgia, lived in Aiken; suffragist
- Gloria Saunders (1927–1980), actress, born in Columbia
- Valerie Sayers (born 1952) in Beaufort; novelist
- Martha Schofield (1839-1916) born in Newtown Township, Pennsylvania, worked in Aiken; suffragist, educator
- Marie Samuella Cromer Seigler (1882-1964), born in Abbeville County; created the Aiken County Girls' Tomato Club
- Courtney Shealy (born 1977), born in Columbia, two-time Olympic gold medalist swimmer
- Hilla Sheriff (1903-1988), born in Easley; doctor
- Nekki Shutt, attorney - Longtime LGBTQ activist, publicity for first SC Pride, current chair of SC Bar Association
- Modjeska Monteith Simkins (1899-1992), born in Columbia; leader in African American public health reform
- Katherine Drayton Mayrant Simons (1890-1969), born in Charleston; poet, novelist, and playwright
- Lauren Sklaroff
- Vertamae Smart-Grosvenor (1937-2016), born in Fairfax; culinary anthropologist
- Alice Ravenel Huger Smith (1876-1958), born in Charleston; American painter and printmaker
- Nell Whitley Smith (1929-2011), grew up in NC, but relocated to Easley, SC; member of the SC Senate
- Shawnee Smith (born 1970), born in Orangeburg, film and television actress, musician
- J. Smith-Cameron (born 1955), raised in Greenville, stage and screen actress
- Louise Hammond Willis Snead (1870–1958), born in Charleston, artist, writer, lecturer, and composer
- Mary Amarinthia Snowden (1819-1898), born in Charleston; philanthropist
- Eunice Temple Ford Stackhouse (1885-1980), born in Marlboro County; educator, clubwoman
- Dawn Staley (born 1970) born in Philadelphia, works in South Carolina; basketball coach and player
- Kay Stanley founder and CEO of Spartina 449
- Ferdinan Backer Stevenson (1928-2001), born in New Rochelle, NY, lived in Charleston; preservationist
- Viola Duvall Stewart (1919-2010), born in Charleston; teacher and activist
- Carole Stoneking
- Lily Strickland (1884-1958), born in Anderson; composer, painter, and writer
- Jessica Stroup (born 1986), born in Anderson, actress, 90210, The Following, Ted
- Madame Rose Talvande (c. 1790-c 1840), worked in Charleston; educator
- Anna Heyward Taylor (1879-1956), born in Columbia; painter and printmaker
- Dorothy Perry Thompson
- Melanie Thornton (1967–2001), born in Charleston; Eurodance singer for La Bouche, famous for the singles "Be My Lover" and "Sweet Dreams"
- Kelly Tilghman (born 1969), from North Myrtle Beach; broadcaster for The Golf Channel, and the PGA Tour's first female lead golf announcer
- Lucy Dugas Tillman activist for custody rights
- Jean H. Toal (born 1943), in Columbia; chief justice of the Supreme Court of SC
- Gina Tolleson (born 1970), from Spartanburg; American model and beauty queen crowned Miss World America 1990
- Cornelia Dabney Tucker (1881-1970), born in Charlotte, NC; political activist in Charleston
- Ann Eliza Jones Turner (1830-1894)
- Angelica Singleton Van Buren (1818–1877), born in Wedgefield; married Abraham Van Buren while his father, Martin Van Buren, was the eighth President of the United States; served as First Lady of the United States for the rest of his term in the White House
- Elizabeth O'Neill Verner (1883-1979), born in Charleston; artist, author, lecturer, and preservationist
- Clemmie E. Webber (1913-2012), born in St. Mathews; educator and community activist
- Angelina Emily Grimké Weld
- Helena Wells (born c 1761 - 1824), born in Charleston; novelist
- Marjory Heath Wentworth (born 1958), born in Lynn, Massachusetts, worked in South Carolina; poet
- Annie Belle Weston (1893-1968) born in Fotte Motte in Calhoun County; advocate for youth empowerment, literacy
- Celia Weston (born 1951), from Spartanburg; character actress
- Frances Anne Rollin Whipper (1845-1901), born in Charleston; political and civil rights activist
- Lucille Whipper (1928-2021), born in Charleston; politician
- Lily C. Whitaker (c. 1850–1932), born in Charleston; educator and author
- Mary Scrimzeour Whitaker (1820–1906), born in Beaufort; litterateur, writer, poet, and novelist
- Vanna White (born 1957), from North Myrtle Beach; co-host on Wheel of Fortune
- Marion B. Wilkinson (1870-1956), born in Charleston; African American suffragist and first president of the South Carolina Federation of Colored Women's Clubs
- Hannah English Williams (died 1722), lived near Charleston; collector of natural history
- Teresa Williams - longtime LGBTQ activist, founder and owner of Bluestocking Books, the first LGBTQ and feminist bookstore in Columbia
- A'ja Wilson (born 1996), born in Hopkins; basketball player for the Las Vegas Aces, 2x WNBA MVP
- Donella Brown Wilson (1909-2018), born in Fort Motte; educator and civil rights activist
- Kate Vixon Wofford (1894-1954), first woman to hold state office in SC
- Rosa Louise Woodberry (1869–1932), journalist, educator; born in Barnwell County, South Carolina; lived in, Williston, South Carolina
- Sylvia Woods (1926-2012), born in Hemingway, SC; restauranteur
- Alice Buck Norwood Spearman Wright (1902-1989), born in Marion, SC; liberal feminist and advocate for human relations
- Elizabeth Evelyn Wright (1872-1906) norm in Talbotton, Georgia, moved to Hampton County, SC; humanitarian and educator
- Mary Honor Farrow Wright (1862-1946) born in Spartanburg; African American educator and civic leader
- Virginia Durant Young (1842-1906), born in Georgetown; suffragist, temperance activist, author
