= South Carolina Equal Rights Association =

The South Carolina Equal Rights Association was the first women's suffrage organization in the U.S. state of South Carolina. It was the local branch of the National American Woman Suffrage Association (NAWSA). It was founded by Virginia Durant Young in 1890. It was dissolved after the death of Virginia Durant Young in 1906, and succeeded by the South Carolina Equal Suffrage League (SCESL) in 1914.
