= Jane Bruce Guignard =

American physician

- Born: October 30, 1876; Aiken County, South Carolina, U.S.
- Died: January 11, 1963 (aged 86); Columbia, South Carolina, U.S.
- Occupations: Physician; suffragist; philanthropist
- Relatives: Frances Guignard Gibbes (cousin)

Jane Bruce Guignard (October 30, 1876 – January 11, 1963) was an American physician, suffragist, and philanthropist, based in South Carolina.

== Early life and education ==
Guignard was born in Aiken County, South Carolina, the daughter of John Gabriel Guignard and Jane Bruce Salley Guignard. She was the youngest of nine brothers and sisters. Her father was a Confederate States Army veteran of the American Civil War. She was a student at The College for Women in Columbia in Columbia, South Carolina, and trained for teaching at Peabody College in Tennessee, graduating in 1896. She moved to Philadelphia in 1900 to attend the Woman's Medical College of Pennsylvania after recovering from serious injuries from a horse and carriage accident that was fatal to her mother. She graduated from the Woman's Medical College of Pennsylvania in 1904. Writer Frances Guignard Gibbes was a cousin.

== Career ==
Guignard taught in Columbia City Schools for four years before moving to Philadelphia to attend medical college. She was an intern at the Women's Hospital for one year before returning to Columbia. She was one of the city's first women physicians, beginning her practice there in 1905, specializing on obstetrics and pediatrics. She was also an attending physician on staff at the College for Women and Columbia College from 1905 to 1908. Delivering babies at home exposed her to the health risks faced by the city's poorer residents, and she opened a small maternity home in the 1920s. She served as the second assistant to the chief surgeon at Columbia Hospital and worked to improve services for women and children. She also created a training program for black midwives. She practiced medicine for over 55 years delivering over 1,000 babies throughout her career. She was honored by Columbia Hospital, noted for her holistic approach to care, and presented with a portrait of herself to be hung at the hospital in 1940. She was a member of the Medical Women's National Association.

Guignard was president of the Columbia Equal Suffrage League. After suffrage was won, she was co-founder of the Columbia League of Women Voters, and state chair of the Social Hygiene Department of the South Carolina League of Women Voters. She wrote an open letter to a mayoral candidate about vice in Columbia in 1922. She was active in Altrusa, and was honored by the local chapter in 1959, for her many years of service to the community. She was also honored in 1954 at her 50th anniversary ceremony of graduating from the Woman's Medical College of Pennsylvania.

Guignard gave eugenic cautions about mate selection along with other prenatal advice in a lecture at a community baby clinic in 1924. Matilda Evans, a Black woman physician in Columbia, admired Guignard as a colleague, saying Guignard was one "whose soul is in the work of caring for and helping suffering humanity."

Guignard and her sister Caroline funded a lecture series at the University of South Carolina as a memorial to their brother, Gabriel Alexander Guignard, who died in 1926. Late in life, she donated the Guignard family property called Still Hopes to the local Episcopal diocese to use as a retirement home. She attended the ground-breaking for Trinity Home, as the project was named, in 1960.

== Personal life ==
Guignard died from leukemia in 1963, at the age of 86, in Columbia, South Carolina. Still Hopes Retirement Community remains in operation as of 2024, with the skilled nursing portion of the facilities named for Jane Bruce Guignard.
