= J. D. Smith (fullback, born 1932) =

American football player (1932–2015)

- Smith in 1961

No. 39, 24
- Positions: Fullback, Halfback, defensive back

Personal information
- Born: July 19, 1932; Greenville, South Carolina, U.S.
- Died: April 1, 2015 (aged 83); Oakland, California, U.S.
- Listed height: 6 ft 1 in (1.85 m)
- Listed weight: 205 lb (93 kg)

Career information
- High school: Sterling (Greenville)
- College: North Carolina A&T
- NFL draft: 1955: 15th round, 179th overall pick

Career history
- Chicago Bears (1956); San Francisco 49ers (1956–1964); Dallas Cowboys (1965–1966)

Awards and highlights
- Second-team All-Pro (1959); 2× Pro Bowl (1959, 1962); 3× All-CIAA (1953, 1954, 1955); 2× Little All-American (1954, 1955)

Career NFL statistics
- Rushing yards: 4,672
- Rushing average: 4.2
- Receptions: 127
- Receiving yards: 1,122
- Total touchdowns: 46
- Stats at Pro Football Reference

J. D. Smith Jr. (July 19, 1932 – April 1, 2015) — the initials stand for nothing — was an American professional football player who was a running back in the National Football League (NFL) for the Chicago Bears, San Francisco 49ers, and Dallas Cowboys. He was a second team All-Pro in 1959 and was twice a member of the NFL Pro Bowl team.

Smith played college football for the North Carolina A&T Aggies and was a three-time member of the All-Colored Intercollegiate Athletic Association team. He was made an inaugural member of the North Carolina A&T Sports Hall of Fame in 1971.

== Early life ==
J.D. Smith Jr. attended Sterling High School in Greenville, South Carolina, where he played football, basketball, and baseball. He accepted a football scholarship from North Carolina A&T State University, from which he graduated with a Bachelor of Science degree in physical education and social studies in 1956.

He was named the starter at fullback as a sophomore, leading the team with 73 carries for 396 yards (5.4 avg.) and 8 touchdowns in 10 games. He led the team again as a senior, appearing in 8 games with 89 carries for 482 yards (5.3 avg.) and 4 touchdowns.

== Professional career ==
=== Chicago Bears ===
Smith was selected by the Chicago Bears in the fifteenth round (179th overall) of the 1955 NFL draft. He spend the year out of football serving his military service in the Korean War.

He returned in 1956, but the team had a surplus of running backs (Rick Casares, Bobby Watkins, John Hoffman, J.C. Caroline and Perry Jeter), so he was moved to the defensive side. He was used as a kick off returner, linebacker and safety, before being waived after the sixth game of the season.

=== San Francisco 49ers ===
In 1956, he was claimed off waivers by the San Francisco 49ers and played the remaining 5 games of the season as a reserve defensive back. The next year, he played at left cornerback, registering 2 interceptions and finishing third in the league with a 26.3-yard average in kickoff returns.

In 1958, while he served as a kickoff returner, he was eased into the running back position until the eleventh game of the season when he ran for 113 yards on seven carries, including and 80-yard touchdown. He was dubbed the "Cinderella Workhorse" by 49ers historian Donn Sinn, for his inauspicious route into prominence.

In 1959, Hugh McElhenny was moved to flanker and Smith was named the starter at left halfback alongside Joe Perry. He finished second in the NFL (behind Jim Brown) with 1,036 rushing yards, becoming the second player in franchise history to have a 1,000-yard rushing season (Perry was the first one) and tied a team record with 10 rushing touchdowns. In the following years he played halfback and fullback, leading the team in rushing for 5 consecutive seasons. He also was a part of the 'Alphabet Backfield', that included Y. A. Tittle, R.C. Owens and C.R. Roberts. In 1964, he was a backup and rushed for 55 yards on 13 carries.

On September 6, 1965, he was traded to the Dallas Cowboys in exchange for a fifth round draft choice (#69-Mel Phillips). At the time he ranked second all-time on the 49ers career rushing list with 4,370 yards.

=== Dallas Cowboys ===
In 1965, he was acquired by the Dallas Cowboys to be a backup fullback for Don Perkins. On September 5, 1967, he was released after the team decided to keep rookie running back Craig Baynham.

== NFL career statistics ==
Legend
**Bold**	Career high

Year	Team	Games		Rushing					Receiving				
Year	Team	GP	GS	Att	Yds	Avg	Lng	TD	Rec	Yds	Avg	Lng	TD
1958	SFO	12	0	26	209	**8.0**	**80**	3	6	59	9.8	23	0
1959	SFO	12	12	207	**1,036**	5.0	73	**10**	13	133	10.2	21	**1**
1960	SFO	12	12	174	780	4.5	41	5	**36**	181	5.0	21	**1**
1961	SFO	14	14	167	823	4.9	33	8	28	**343**	**12.3**	**57**	**1**
1962	SFO	14	14	**258**	907	3.5	28	6	21	197	9.4	47	**1**
1963	SFO	14	13	162	560	3.5	52	5	17	196	11.5	40	**1**
1964	SFO	2	2	13	55	4.2	16	0	0	0	0.0	0	0
1965	DAL	14	3	86	295	3.4	24	2	5	10	2.0	5	**1**
1966	DAL	14	1	7	7	1.0	2	1	1	3	3.0	3	0
Career		131	84	1,100	4,672	4.2	80	40	127	1,122	8.8	57	6

== Personal life ==
In 1968, Smith was hired as a scout for the San Francisco 49ers and remained in that post for 7 years. He worked as a security executive at Sears until his retirement in 1991.

Smith died on April 1, 2015, in his home in Oakland, California.

In 1971, he was inducted as an inaugural member into the North Carolina A&T Sports Hall of Fame.
