= Sterling High School (South Carolina) =

South Carolina historically Black high school

Location
- Greenville, South Carolina; United States; 34.8381°N 82.4193°W

Information
- Former names: Sterling Academy; (1896-?); Sterling Industrial College; (?-1915); Enoree High School; (1915-1929)
- Established: 1896
- Closed: 1970

Sterling High School served African American students in Greenville, South Carolina between 1896 and 1970.

== History ==
Sterling High School was affiliated with the John Wesley Church and was established by Rev. D. M. Minus (Daniel Melton Minus) in 1896 as Sterling Academy.

The school was named Sterling Industrial College for Mrs. E. R. Sterling of Poughkeepsie, New York, who funded Rev. Minus's college education at Claflin University in Orangeburg, South Carolina. Sterling Industrial College became Enoree High School in 1915. In 1929, it became a public district school and returned to the Sterling name.

In 1930 a building permit for "Sterling negro high school" was approved for $26,000. The permit was for two stories, each 13 feet high. The architect was Haskell Martin, and the builders were Potter and Shackleford.

A fire destroyed the school in 1967. According to Principal M.T. Anderson, the Greenville County Legislative Delegation had recently approved a $500,000 bond issue for a high-priority renovation. An architect had been hired to make preliminary plans. However, two building code requirements prevented rebuilding on the site. First, the part of the school left standing only represented about one-third of the total structure, but according to the state's school building code, "if more than 50 per cent of a structure is lost, the entire school must be demolished and completely rebuilt". Second, the school's enrollment of over 1000 pupils required an additional 10 acres of land, a total of 20 acres, but there was not enough land around Sterling to meet that requirement.

The school board and representatives of the community agreed on a plan for "housing all of the district's students in the best manner possible", with construction of 14-classroom additions each to Carolina and Wade Hampton High School's, with extensive repairs. These additional classrooms, available existing classrooms, and those under construction would provide "classrooms to accommodate all the students presently enrolled in the high schools in and around the city."

An editorial in The Greenville News declared it was an "Unhappy solution, but the best one". Sterling High students attended Beck High School in shifts and were then taught at Greenville Junior High School until Sterling High School closed in 1970 following desegregation.

== Present site use ==
A new Sterling Recreation Center was dedicated on the site of the old Sterling High School in July 1970. A statue by Mariah Kirby-Smith commemorates the history of the school.

== Alumni ==
- Bill Thompson (American football) football player who is in the Maryland State College Hall of Fame (now the University of Maryland Eastern Shore) and a three-time pro-bowler for the Denver Broncos
- James Davis, member of the Dixie Hummingbirds
- Lottie Gibson, civil rights activist and longtime Greenville County council member
- Thomas Kerns, Greenville County superintendent of schools
- Rev. S. C. Cureton, president of the National Baptist Convention USA
- Jesse Jackson (class of 1959), civil rights activist, served as president of his class and played football baseball and basketball at the school.
- Ralph Anderson, state legislator
- J. D. Smith (fullback, born 1932), football player
