= Virginia Durant Young House =

Historic house in South Carolina, United States

- U.S. National Register of Historic Places
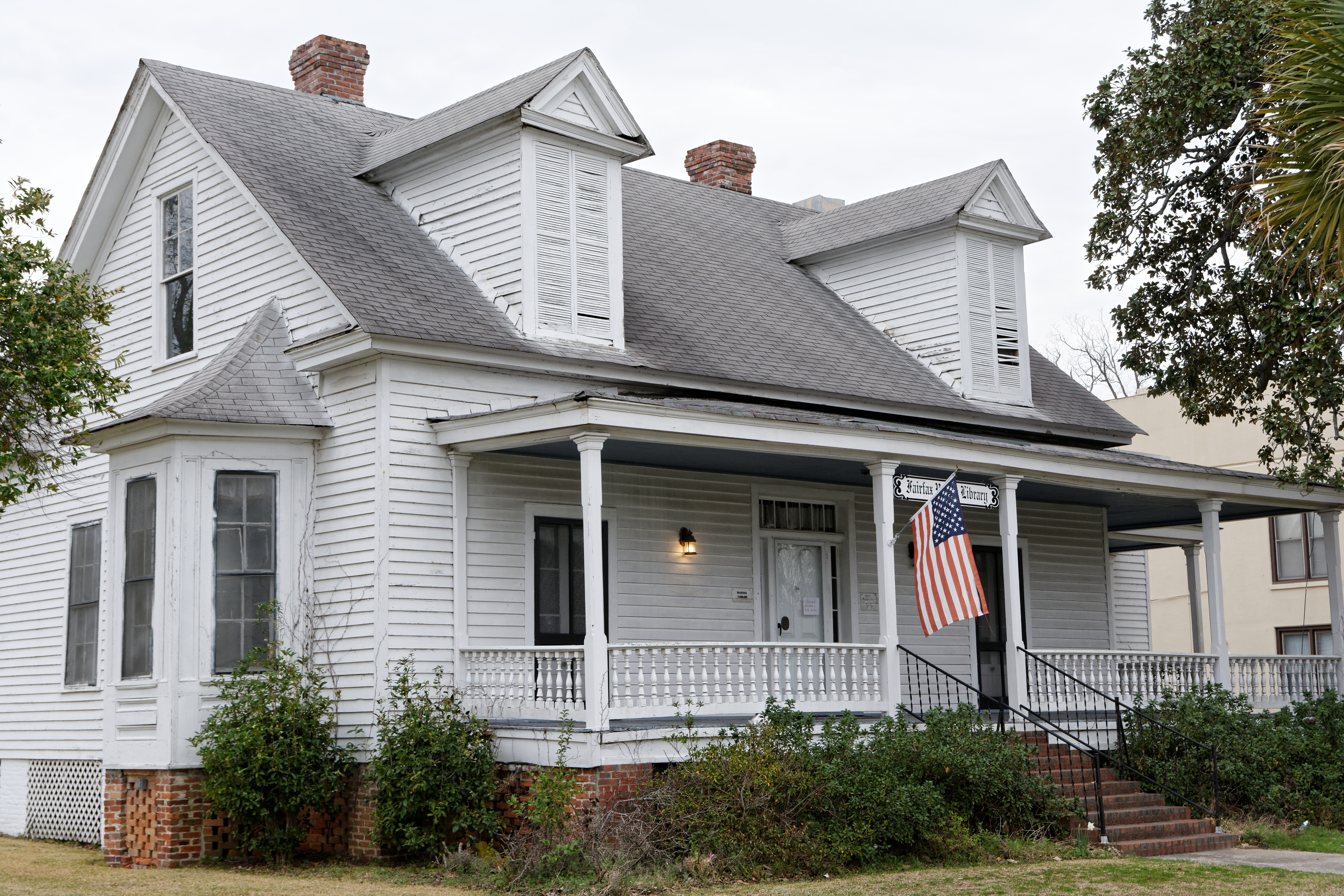
- The house in 2017

- Location within South Carolina Location within the United States
- Location: US 278, Fairfax, South Carolina
- Coordinates: 32.95973°N 81.23875°W
- Area: 0.5 acres (0.20 ha)
- Built: 1881
- Architectural style: Late Victorian
- NRHP reference No.: 83002183
- Added to NRHP: August 8, 1983

The Virginia Durant Young House, also known as Fairfax Public Library, is a historic home located at Fairfax, Allendale County, South Carolina. It was built in 1881, and is a 1 1/2-story frame, weatherboarded, vernacular Victorian cottage with a gable roof. It was the home of Virginia Durant Young, journalist, novelist, humanitarian, political activist and internationally recognized leader of the women's suffrage movement in South Carolina and the nation. The house rests on brick piers and has an irregular U-shaped plan that incorporated a medical office for Dr. William Jasper Young. Despite popular conventions of the time, Mrs. Young was the sole owner of the couple's home and deeded the house to Dr. Young upon her death. The home also served as the office for Mrs. Young's newspaper, the Fairfax Enterprise and as the office for Dr. Young's medical practice. Upon the death of Dr. Young, the home was willed to the town of Fairfax for use as a public library and now houses the Fairfax Public Library. It was added to the National Register of Historic Places in 1983.
