= Emily Plume Evans =

American woman's rights activist

Emily Plume Evans (May 9, 1865 – April 4, 1942), born Emily Mansfield Plume, was an American women's activist who was the founder of the New Era Club, South Carolina's first suffrage club. She was also the founding member of the League of Women Voters of South Carolina.

== Early life and education ==
Emily Plume Evans was born on May 9, 1865 in Newark, New Jersey. She was the daughter of Abbie Richardson and David Scott Plume. David Scott was a legislator, banker, and manufacturer. She spent most of her childhood in Waterbury, Connecticut. In 1895, Evans met South Carolina Governor John Gary Evans, during his visit to New York, and they married in 1897 in Waterbury, Connecticut. They moved to Spartanburg, South Carolina and had one child, a daughter named Emily Victoria Evans Knutson, in August 1899.

In 1901, they moved into their home in Spartanburg, now known as the Evans-Russel house, where they lived until they died in 1942.

== Career ==
Episcopal Church of the Advent in Spartanburg was where Evans was an active member. Evans was also in the local chapter of the General Federation of Women's Clubs.

In 1912, Evans and her friend Helen G. Howland formed South Carolina's first statewide women's suffrage organization, which they named the New Era Club. The New Era Club only lasted a short amount of time. It was populated by mainly white middle class women, and was disguised as a study group. They met twice a month to discuss education, public health, and the educational rights of women and children. In 1914, Evans' club joined the National American Women Suffrage Association (NAWSA). Columbia and Charleston followed suit after Spartanburg, and together they united and became the South Carolina Equal Suffrage League on May 15, 1915.

The South Carolina Equal Suffrage League became affiliated with the National American Women Suffrage Association. The goal through the organization was to bring awareness to South Carolina and win over the public through their literature, petitions, speakers, and parades.

Following the path of 1917, Congress passed a suffrage amendment, and Evans and her club members continued to host rallies across the state to lobby politicians to ratify the amendment. By 1920, Evans was the founding member of the League of Women Voters of South Carolina (LWVSC).

Evans continued advocating for better working conditions for women and children in the state textile mills industries. She became the chair of the Committee on Social and Industrial Conditions of South Carolina Federation of Women's Clubs in 1916. Evans petitioned for more strict child labor laws and working hour regulations, and efficient education laws. Evans became president of the Spartanburg Florence Crittenden Circle, an etiquette and correctional school for wayward girls.

== Death ==
Emily Plume Evans died on April 4, 1942 in Spartanburg, South Carolina and was buried alongside her husband in their hometown of Edgefield.
