= Love Gantt =

American physician

Love Rosa Gantt
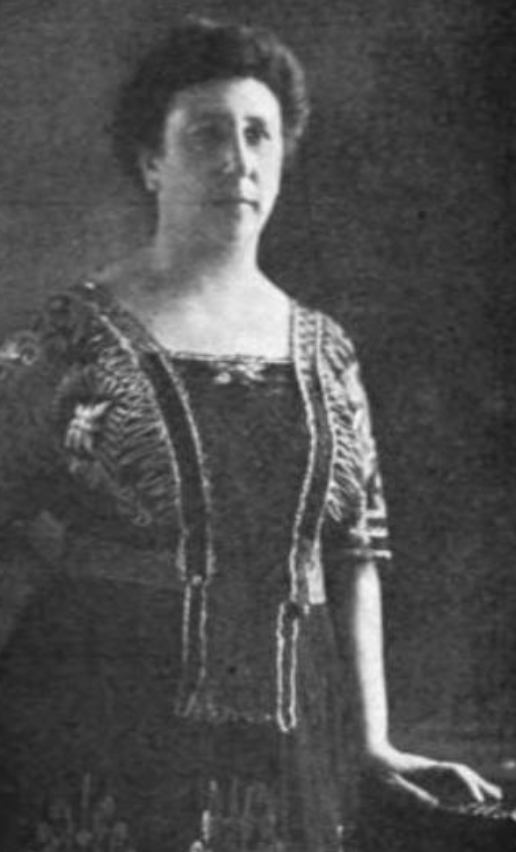
- Rosa H. Gantt, from a 1921 publication
- Born: 29 December 1875; Camden, South Carolina, US
- Died: 16 November 1935 (aged 59); Philadelphia, Pennsylvania, US
- Education: Medical College of South Carolina (M.D.)
- Spouse: Robert Joseph Gantt
- Scientific career
- Fields: Medicine
- Workplaces: Winthrop College

Love Rosa Hirschmann Gantt (December 29, 1875 – November 16, 1935), was an American physician based in South Carolina.

== Early life and education ==
Love Rosa Hirschmann was born in Camden, South Carolina, the daughter of Solomon Hirschmann and Lena Nachman Hirschmann. Her family was Jewish; her father was an immigrant from central Europe.

Educated in the Charleston, South Carolina public schools, she was one of the first two women to graduate from the Medical College of South Carolina when she finished her medical degree there in 1901. She then trained at the New York Ophthalmic and Aural Institute under the supervision of Jacob Hermann Knapp, and at the New York University Eye and Ear Clinic.

== Career ==
Upon her return to South Carolina, Hirschmann briefly became the staff physician at Winthrop College before leaving to marry Robert Joseph Gantt. She set up a private practice in 1905 in ophthalmology and otolaryngology and began a second career of public service. She was the first woman physician in Spartanburg, and the second woman physician in the United States to become board-certified. Hirschmann specialized in the eyes, ears, nose and throat department during this time.

As president of the American Medical Women's Association, Gantt persuaded their associated American Women's Hospitals Service to start a mobile public health service in the southern Appalachians, working with Hilla Sheriff to bring vaccinations, nutritional education, prenatal care, dental examinations, and preventive health screenings to remote places in the South. Gantt served on the South Carolina Board of Public Welfare for five years and was legislative chairman of the South Carolina Equal Suffrage League.

Gantt "organized and headed the Spartanburg Health League, the Spartanburg Anti-Tuberculosis Association, and the public health and legislation committees of the South Carolina Federation of Women’s Clubs." During World War I, she organized Liberty Loan drives, served on a draft board, directed recreation at Camp Wadsworth, and was commissioned as a medical examiner for Air Force pilots. In 1916, she helped establish the first synagogue in Spartanburg, South Carolina, which was called Temple B'nai Israel. She also founded its women's group, the Sisterhood of Temple B'nai Israel, which helped raise money for stained glass windows, pews, and classroom flooring. This group also welcomed Converse College Students and supported soldiers at Camp Wadsworth during World War I by organizing religious services and entertainment. She was president of the South Carolina Federation of Temple Sisterhoods.

== Personal life ==
In 1905, Hirschmann married Robert Joseph Gantt, an attorney. In 1935, she died at the Woman's Hospital of Philadelphia from an embolism after surgery for uterine cancer, at the age of 59. There is a historic marker about Rosa H. Gantt located near the site of her medical office in Spartanburg's Morgan Square.
