= Louisa Bouknight Poppenheim =

Louisa Bouknight Poppenheim (1866-1957) was a clubwoman born in South Carolina during the Progressive Era. Poppenheim was co-owner and editor of the Keystone, a magazine used to promote southern clubwomen culture through club news, stories, book reviews, and other works relating to southern women's traditions.

== Early life and education ==
Louisa Bouknight Poppenheim was born in Charleston, South Carolina, in 1866. Her mother was Mary Elinor Bouknight, and her father was Christopher Pritchard Poppenheim, an American Civil War Confederate soldier turned agricultural merchant. There father moved to charleston after the civil war and opened a dry goods store. During her childhood, Poppenheim was enrolled at the Charleston Female Seminary, and she also worked with various tutors throughout her time as a young girl. Lousia attended Vassar College in Poughkeepsie, New York, alongside her sister Mary Barnett Poppenheim. It is at Vassar College where Louisa gained numerous leadership skills, along with knowledge regarding women's rights and limited women's suffrage. She graduated from Vassar in 1889 and returned to South Carolina.

== Career ==
Poppenheim became a very prominent leader in the clubwomen movement, Poppenheim works very closely with her sister Mary. Louisa became involved in the Century Club, Charleston City Federation of Clubs, the Intercollegiate Club, Civic Club, the Ladies Memorial Association, the Daughters of the American Revolution, and the South Carolina Division of the United Daughters of the Confederacy. She was the president of the South Carolina Federation of Women's Clubs. Poppenheim also held multiple offices within the General Federation of Women's Clubs, a national federation that had various women's clubs under its umbrella.

Poppenheim persuaded politicians to allow a woman to be appointed to work with female prisoners, which led her to sit chair for the Municipal Playground Commission, which was the first municipal commission in Charleston to allow women members.

Poppenheim cared about improving schools and libraries, as well as helping women get more education. She did most of this work for free.

Beginning in 1899, the Poppenheim sisters, Louisa and Mary, owned and edited Keystone magazine. The purpose of the magazine was to create a better way for clubwomen to communicate, as well as make it easier for clubs to promote ideals, events, and other important information. Club leaders and organizations were able to put reports and initiatives in the Keystone, the Poppenheim sisters felt the need for a journal, or magazine, that would allow women to discuss their views and beliefs freely.

The magazine included works such as literature, book reviews, recipes and food reviews. The sisters also published their own works and ideas of topics like southern womanhood. Keystone readers were also encouraged to have conversations regarding the magazine; they were highly encouraged to write in their thoughts regarding the topics the magazine covered.

Eventually, the magazine became the primary way for the United Daughters of the Confederacy to communicate with clubwomen throughout multiple southern states including, Florida, Mississippi, North Carolina, and Virginia. The Keystone ran for fourteen years, from 1899-1913.

== Later life and death ==
At the end of her life, Louisa lived at the home her parents had lived in on Meeting Street in Charleston, South Carolina. In 1957, Louisa Bouknight Poppenheim died and was buried at Magnolia Cemetery alongside her sister.
