= Virginia Durant Young =

American journalist

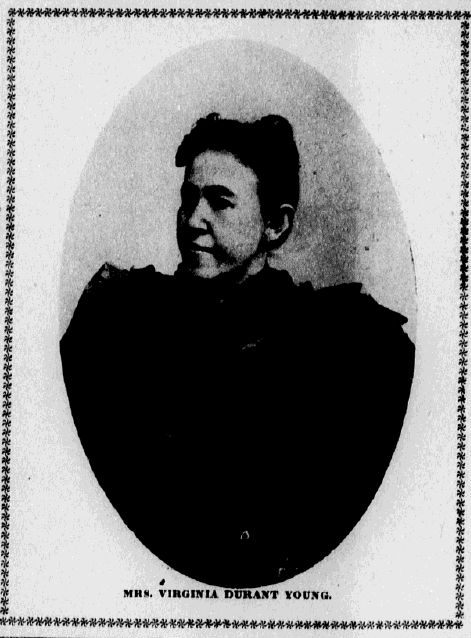
- Photo of Virginia Durant Young from the March 13, 1904 issue of The State (newspaper)
- Born: 10 March 1842; Georgetown, South Carolina
- Died: 2 November 1906 (aged 64)
- Occupations: suffragist; temperance activist; author; journalist; newspaper editor and owner

Virginia Durant Covington Young (10 March 1842 – 2 November 1906) was an American suffragist, temperance activist, author, as well as a journalist, newspaper editor and owner. After serving as editor of South Carolina's Fairfax Enterprise weekly newspaper, Young became the newspaper's sole owner in 1899. Her work for women's suffrage in South Carolina was widely recognized, though South Carolinian women gained the right to vote years after Young's death.

== Early life and career ==
Virginia Durant Covington Young was born in Georgetown, South Carolina to William Wallace Durant, a state legislator, and Julia Durant. At age 16, Young married Benjamin H. Covington, a Confederate soldier who later died in 1879. Once widowed, Young moved from Mississippi back to South Carolina where she and her late husband had lived. In 1880, she married Dr. William Jasper Young of Fairfax, South Carolina. The couple were devoted to one another and both firmly supported women's equality. Young had sole title to the couple's home and managed her own money, which was an anomaly at the time. In 1891, Young became one of a few female members of the South Carolina Press Association. During this time, Young was also running the Fairfax Enterprise weekly newspaper from her home after becoming sole owner of the paper in 1899.

== Activism ==
=== Temperance ===
Young began her work with the Women's Christian Temperance Union (WCTU) in 1886. She attended the state convention of the WCTU held in Charleston in 1889, where she met other women committed to issues of temperance and women's suffrage. In 1890, Young became the corresponding secretary of the South Carolina chapter of the WCTU. In the same year, Young and several like-minded women, established the South Carolina Equal Rights Association (SCERA) at a meeting in Greenville.

=== Women's suffrage ===
In establishing SCERA, Young began to make a name for herself as a suffragist on the state and national level. Her local efforts were detailed in the printed program for the twenty-fifth annual convention of the National American Woman Suffrage Association (NAWSA) in 1893. In her three short years with the SCERA, Young had become the president of her state's chapter of NAWSA. Young gave speeches on women's equality to the South Carolina WCTU and the South Carolina Press Association. She and her SCERA contemporaries also lobbied politicians for support.

In 1892, state legislator General Robert R. Hemphill introduced an amendment to the South Carolina Senate that would grant women the right to vote. This amendment was voted down 21 to 14.

== Death and legacy ==
Aged 64, Virginia Durant Young died from pneumonia on November 2nd, 1906. She left her home to Dr. Young who continued to live and practice medicine in the home until his death. Upon the death of Dr. Young, his will left the home to the town of Fairfax to be used as a public library. Young's Fairfax home was added to the National Register of Historic Places in 1983.

As a result of Young's death, the movement for women's equality and suffrage in South Carolina dissipated. Statewide suffrage efforts were no longer tracked by NAWSA and SCERA dissolved.

Young is buried in Fairfax and her gravesite is adorned with a monument that reads: "She climbed the heights and held aloft the torch of liberty for her sex."

== Writings ==
In addition to her many contributions to the Fairfax Enterprise and other newspapers, Young wrote three novels:

- Beholding as in a Glass (1895)
- A Tower in the Desert (1896)
- One of the Blue Hen's Chickens (1902)
