= Evans-Russell House =

Historic house in South Carolina, United States

- U.S. National Register of Historic Places
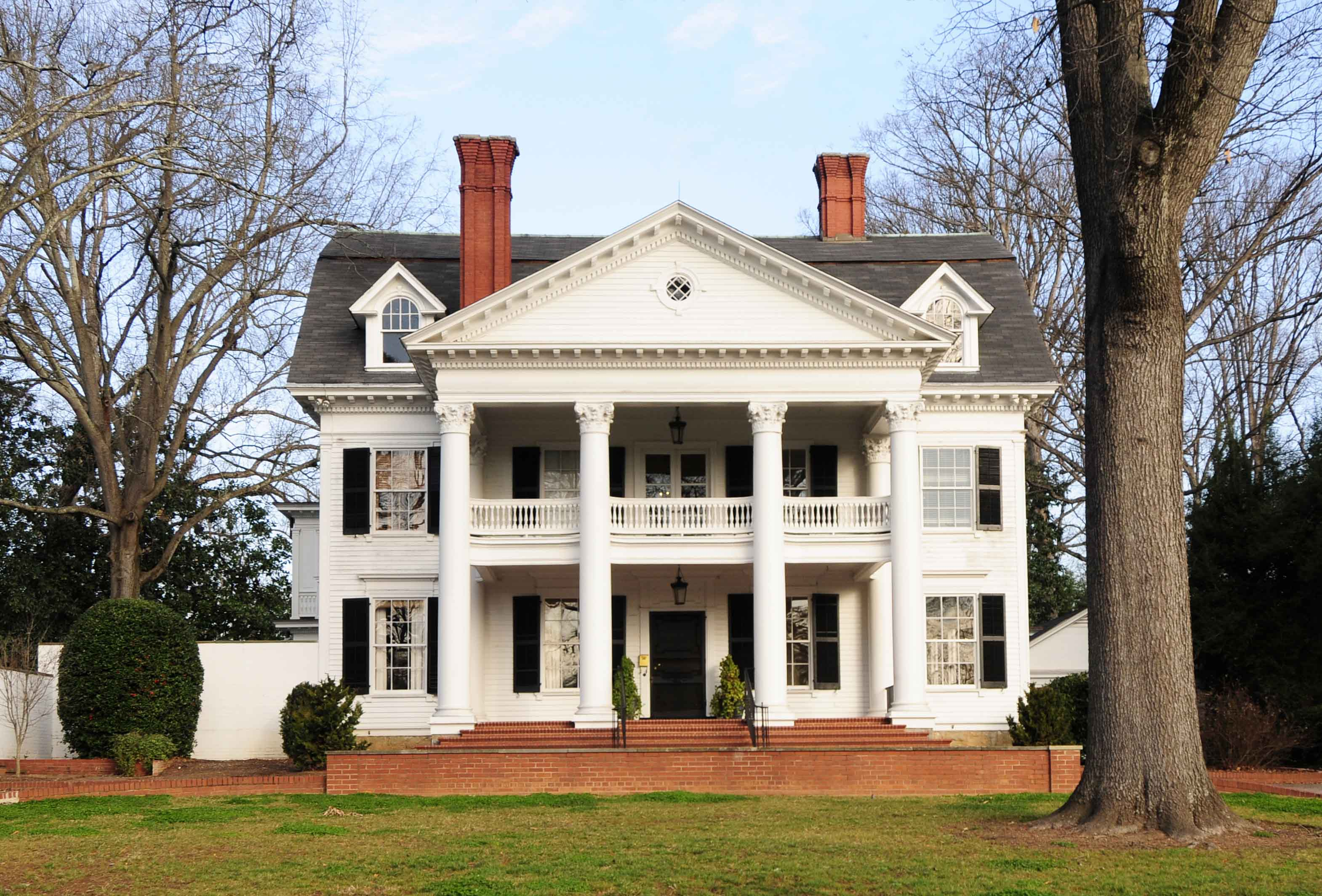

- Location within South Carolina
- Location: 716 Otis Blvd., Spartanburg, South Carolina
- Coordinates: 34°57′9″N 81°54′33″W
- Area: 1.5 acres (0.61 ha)
- Built: 1901
- Architectural style: Classical Revival
- NRHP reference No.: 07000183
- Added to NRHP: March 21, 2007

The Evans-Russell House is a Neo-Classical Revival house in Spartanburg, South Carolina that was built for Governor John Gary Evans in 1901. Later, it was the home of Senator Donald S. Russell. It was listed on the National Register of Historic Places in 2007.

== History ==
The house was built in 1901 for former Governor Evans. He resided there with his wife, Emily Plume Evans until their deaths in 1942. It was purchased by a Spartanburg judge, Jennings L. Thompson. He sold the house to Donald Russell, who was governor of South Carolina from 1963 to 1965 and U.S. senator from 1965 to 1966. It remained his home until his death in 1998.

== Architecture ==
The 6,000 ft^{2} (560 m^{2}), two and one-half story house is also significant for its early Neo-Classical architecture in Upstate South Carolina. It has a side gable roof associated with Dutch Colonial architecture. The residence has a two-story portico with Corinthian columns. The structure is ornamented with dentil work and modillions. The windows are double-hung sash windows.
