= Harriet Catherine Frazier Johnson =

Harriet Catherine Frazier Johnson (December 3, 1889 – January 27, 1972) was a pioneering educator, civic leader, and the first woman ever elected to the South Carolina House of Representatives. Her bill to provide schoolbooks for children in York County was so popular that the General Assembly amended it to apply to all high schools in the state. Over a long career of service spanning rural education, 4-H youth work, international missionary efforts, and state politics, Johnson dedicated her life to improving opportunities for both women and children in South Carolina and abroad.

== Early life and education ==
Johnson was born in Pelzer, South Carolina, on December 3, 1889, to Steven Frazier and Susan Rowland. She grew up in Walhalla, spending her early years working to save money so she could afford college. In 1913, she entered Winthrop College. Frazier graduated from Winthrop in 1917 with a bachelor of arts degree.

On December 11, 1917, she married Richard Hughes Johnson; Richard died in November 1918 while serving in the army in France during World War I.

She pursued further education at Columbia University's Teachers College, where she graduated with a bachelor's degree in science in 1927 and a master's degree in 1930.

== Career ==
After graduating from Winthrop, Johnson was hired by Spartanburg County as an extension agent. From 1922 to1944 she was the head of the state 4-H girls’ clubs headquartered at Winthrop. In October 1944, she left her job to focus on her church and civic duties.

On January 27, 1945, the South Carolina White House Conference met in Columbia and urged women to run for office. In February 1945, a special election was held in York County to replace representative Henry Mills, who had resigned to become sergeant-at-arms for the State House. Johnson ran for office and had a woman campaign manager. After a campaign of less than a week, Johnson defeated her three male opponents by only five votes and became the first woman elected to the South Carolina House of Representatives. Johnson later said that she ran for the General Assembly at the urging of friends and members of the groups that sponsored this meeting, including the American Association of University Women and the Federation of Business and Professional Women in South Carolina. Because the S.C. House rules required that members be addressed as “Mr.,” the Speaker referred to the Rules Committee a request to change the rules and allow her to be addressed as “Mrs.”

== Legacy ==
Johnson served only one term in the legislature. Subsequently she was a Methodist missionary for three years and taught home economics to women in India. She later served as director of recreation and religious activities for the South Carolina Opportunity School in West Columbia. In 1951 the Progressive Farmer magazine named her Woman of the Year for her service in rural progress in South Carolina. Johnson retired to Spartanburg and died there in a nursing home on January 27, 1972. She was buried in Green-lawn Memorial Gardens.
