= Cornelia Dabney Tucker =

American political activist

Cornelia Dabney Tucker (October 15, 1881 - October 28, 1970) was a political activist from Charleston, South Carolina, best known for her opposition to President Franklin D. Roosevelt's New Deal policies. She founded the Supreme Court Security League and played an active role in the South Carolina Republican Party.

== Life ==
Born in Charlotte, North Carolina, to Harvey Mayfield Ramseur and Mary Cosby Badham, Tucker demonstrated academic promise early in life. At age 16, she graduated from Synodical Presbyterian College in Tennessee. Before completing her studies, she moved to Charleston to teach French. In 1899, she married businessman Robert Pinckney Tucker. Together, the couple had five children: Thomas Tudor Tucker, Richard Dabney Tucker, Mary Badham Tucker Kittel, Dorothea Shubrick Tucker Peckham, and Robert Pinckney Tucker Jr.

Following her husband's death in 1920, Tucker faced financial difficulties. She rented out her Charleston home and relocated to Flat Rock, North Carolina. After six years, she returned to Charleston and began working in an antique shop.

== Politics ==
Although she had not previously been involved in politics, Tucker became an outspoken critic of New Deal legislation. Her advocacy began with personal letter-writing and petition campaigns, which eventually led to the founding of the Supreme Court Security League in 1937. This Charleston-based women's organization gathered signatures to send to U.S. senators, expressing opposition to the New Deal and supporting judicial independence.

Tucker later joined the South Carolina Republican Party, where she served as Chair of Publicity. At a time when women in political circles often remained behind the scenes, she drew public attention through newspaper coverage of her activism, marking her as a pioneering voice for conservative women in the South.

In 1940, South Carolina was the only state in the nation that did not provide a unified ballot listing candidates from both major political parties. Instead, voters were required to publicly declare at the polling place which party's ballot they wished to use, effectively preventing them from splitting their ticket between parties. Cornelia Dabney Tucker believed this system placed the Republican Party at a significant disadvantage. In response, she launched a determined and highly visible public campaign advocating for reform of the state's ballot procedures. She addressed the issue before the South Carolina General Assembly, despite not having been formally invited to speak. In 1951, Tucker's efforts achieved success after she secured the backing of several women's organizations and the South Carolina Chamber of Commerce.

Not only did Tucker change the voting system in South Carolina, but she was also a prominent voice of massive resistance after the Brown v. Board of Education, a Supreme Court case that declared racial segregation in public schools unconstitutional. She used her status as an elderly Southern woman to legitimize opposition to desegregation. In 1962, she wrote an affectionate but deeply racist letter to Attorney General Robert F. Kennedy protesting federal support for James Meredith, an American civil rights activist and United States Air Force veteran, and his integration of the University of Mississippi. The letter blamed unrest on Meredith rather than on violent segregationists. Tucker's activism shows that white Southern women played an active and influential role in resisting the Brown decision, helping shape grassroots segregationist discourse and reinforcing the broader movement against desegregation.

== Legacy ==
Tucker continued to advocate for her conservative principles and remained actively involved in political affairs well into her seventies. She advocated for a policy requiring all South Carolina high school students to complete courses in American Government and the free enterprise system as a condition for graduation. Tucker's photograph and letters to the editor were frequent features in South Carolina newspapers, reflecting her continued engagement in public discourse. Her personally typed letters and telegrams often reached the desks of both state and national political leaders.

In the final years of her life, she moved to Atlanta to live with her son, where she died on October 28, 1970.
