= Mary Gordon Ellis =

American educator and politician

Member of the South Carolina Senate
- In office 1934–?
- Preceded by: William Henry Taylor
- Succeeded by: Henry Klugh Purdy

Personal details
- Born: 21 April 1889 Gourdin, South Carolina, U.S.
- Died: 9 September 1934 (aged 45) Kingstree, South Carolina, U.S.
- Spouse: Junius Gather Ellis (m. 1914)
- Children: 3
- Occupation: Politician
- Profession: Educator

Mary Gordon Ellis (21 April 1889 – 9 September 1934) was an educator and politician from South Carolina. She became the first woman elected to the South Carolina Legislature with her election to the South Carolina State Senate in 1928.

== Life ==
Mary Gordon was born to Alexander M. Gordon and Mary Gamble Gordon, Sr. in the small community of Gourdin, near Kingstree; of Scotch-Irish descent, she was one of ten children. When she was small, the family moved into Kingstree, where she grew up, graduating from Kingstree High School in 1909. Already as a child she evinced interest in politics, hanging around the steps of the county courthouse while listening to legal discussions, and sometimes sneaking inside to watch the court proceedings. Upon graduating from high school Ellis taught locally for one year before heading to Winthrop College in Rock Hill for further study. There she graduated in 1913 after working part-time to pay for her education, which was also funded with scholarship money; she had taken a sabbatical due to poor health in 1912, during which she had continued to teach. She then moved south to Jasper County, near the border with Georgia, to serve as teacher and principal at a school in the town of Gillisonville; she was the only female college graduate in the county, and the first teacher there with a college degree.

In 1914 Ellis married Junius Gather Ellis, a farmer and turpentine operator who was relatively affluent for the area; with him she had three children, Mary Elizabeth, Margaret Lee, and Junius Gather. The family lived at Ellis's home, Stockholm, located between Gillisonville and Coosawhatchie. She continued to teach, unusual for a married woman at the time; she and her husband hired a tutor to help educate their children so that she could work. She also assisted in running her husband's businesses. So alarmed were the couple at the poor state of local schools that when their eldest child was ready to begin her formal education, they sent her to live with relatives in Savannah to take advantage of the better schools there; her siblings soon followed. Ellis further invited her sisters, students at Winthrop, to come and live with her during the summer and tutor local students to improve their education. One of their pupils went on to run the theological program at Duke University, while another took a high position at Clemson University.

To combat educational deficiencies in Jasper County, Ellis determined in 1924 to run for the position of county superintendent of schools. Many thought she was joking. Women were still rarities in elected office in South Carolina, and it was only two years since Kate Vixon Wofford had taken office as the first woman elected to public office in the state when she became county superintendent of schools in Laurens County. Some of her acquaintance asked Ellis why she would want to head the county's education programs when her own children were being educated elsewhere; she replied, speaking of local schools, "If they are not good enough for my children, they are not good enough for yours." Elected in 1928 and taking her seat in January 1929, “Mary G,” as she was called by the all-male state Senate, became the first woman to serve in that body.

=== Political career ===
Ellis immediately set about reforming education in Jasper County. One of her first acts was to close many small schools and consolidate students under five districts; she then created a governing board with representatives from each of them. She pushed for the construction of a teacherage, and required her educators to get more training, sometimes meeting on Saturdays and inviting state education officials to send her instructors. She combated nepotism on the county board of education, firing some trustees. She also worked to improve conditions for African-American students, providing them with new textbooks and bus transportation and hiring a black college graduate, Mary Alice Miller, to oversee black schools in the county. She also received matching funds which she used to build four Rosenwald schools. This upset many local whites; one of them, the local state representative, H. Klugh Purdy, wrote Ellis a letter in which he said that she should resign over her behavior. After consultation with the young lawyer's father-in-law, she said that she would not resign, telling him, "You must take me for an idiot." His response was to cause the office of superintendent to become an appointed office rather than an elected one, and soon thereafter local legislators sent Ellis a letter informing her of her termination. The position did not become an elected one again until 1958; the law making the change was sponsored by Ellis's brother-in-law, state senator W. J. Ellis.

When in 1928 Purdy filed to run for the South Carolina Senate Ellis followed suit, winning in a runoff later that year. As a legislator, her economic record was somewhat liberal for the time, but she was quite socially conservative; she opposed divorce and favored "stricter marriage laws". She also supported the legalization of gambling on horse races. She believed in the expansion of women's roles in public life and favored fair treatment for blacks as well. She believed in, and worked for, compulsory education for all South Carolina students. Most of the bills which she introduced were on matters relating to her home county, as was the one speech which she gave from the floor during her time in office. She was known for her independent spirit, refusing to align herself with any factions in the legislature, and she strove to get along with her colleagues, though she was not above criticizing them at times. Her background saw her named to the Education Committee; during her term, she also served on the committees regarding Privileges and Elections, Retrenchments, Incorporations, and Penitentiary, Penal, and Charitable Institutions.

Ellis was defeated for reelection in 1932; uterine cancer, from which she had suffered since her time as school superintendent, made campaigning for her second term extremely difficult. She died fifteen months later at the age of 45, having returned to the family home in Kingstree to be looked after by her sisters, nurses who had remained there to look after their father in his declining years. She is buried in the Williamsburg Cemetery in Kingstree. She kept her interest in state and local politics until the end of her life; one of her last acts was to vote, which she did by absentee ballot the day before her death. She also remained interested in educational issues; though she could not attend her eldest daughter's high school graduation, she attempted to remain involved. Both of her daughters would visit her on weekends and discuss schoolwork with her, and the elder of the two began college at Winthrop not long before her mother's death.

No more women were nominated or appointed to the South Carolina Senate until Elizabeth Johnston Patterson in 1979. Purdy was defeated in 1936 by a brother-in-law of Ellis.

== Honors ==
Recognition of Ellis was slow in coming; for many years residents of Jasper County did not view her as one of their own, and a county history published in the 1940s made no mention of her role in local affairs. Her son attempted to get a historical marker erected regarding her achievements in Ridgeland, the county seat, but this came to naught. When in 1992 the county solicited names for the new county administration building, Ellis's children proposed her as an honoree, but were rebuffed despite the support of the county school board and Ridgeland Town Council; one councilor claimed that she was not chosen as she was not a county native. The building was eventually named for her in 1999. Today it houses several county departments, and a copy of the state house portrait hangs in its entryway.

A portrait of Ellis by Janet Fleming Smith hangs in the South Carolina State House to recognize her contributions to civic life; commissioned by her family, it was accepted by legislators for display after extensive lobbying, and was unveiled on March 29, 1995, the hundredth anniversary of the election of Martha Hughes Cannon as a Utah state senator. Ellis was posthumously awarded the South Carolina Democratic Women's Council Hall Of Fame Award as well. Winthrop University named her a distinguished alumna at its centennial celebrations in 1987. In 1993 she was one of the first three inductees into Jasper County's new hall of fame, and she was honored by the South Carolina Commission on Women at their "Women of Achievement" awards ceremonies in 1994 and 1995.

An archival collection of material related to Ellis and her career can be found in the library of the University of South Carolina.

South Carolina Senate
Preceded by William Henry Taylor	Member of the South Carolina Senate from the Jasper County district 1929–1933	Succeeded by Henry Klugh Purdy
