= Cema Sitton Chreitzberg =

Cema Sitton Chreitzberg (1888 – 1972) is a South Carolina native who dedicated her life to helping her community through the Church by co-founding the Bethlehem Center and managing it for years to follow.

== Early life and education ==
She was born on March 7, 1888 to John and Leilia Sitton in Anderson County, and had two brothers. She attended Congress College in 1904 and graduated with a B.L. degree in 1908 when she decided to continue there to get a Bachelor of Music degree. She married Augustus M. Chreitzberg on March 11, 1911.

== Career ==
Chreitzberg was heavily involved in Bethel Methodist Church where she worked not only as a Sunday School teacher, but also as the President of a women's organization. During her time working, she noticed that many families were struggling due to a lack of help available for preschool-aged children while their mothers were working. This inspired her to help establish the Bethlehem Center in Spartanburg in 1930. This project was a collaborative effort between the Bethel Methodist Church Women's Missionary Society and local Black leaders. The goal was to improve living conditions while focus remained on preschool-aged children. She was the President of the board until 1953. The Center provided many services, including nutrition classes, recreational facilities, and many social services to the community. In 1950, the Center was relocated within Spartanburg and continues to boost the community.

She also had a strong passion for gardening, and her garden was greatly appreciated in the community. She edited articles for the South Carolina Garden Clubs and eventually founded her own club, the Cema Chreitzberg Garden Club.

She died on February 22, 1972.

== Awards ==
In 1957 she was awarded the Mary Mildred Sullivan Award and in 1967 she was honored as an outstanding member of the garden club.
