= Dorcas Nelson Richardson =

American Revolutionary War heroine (1741–1834)

Dorcas Nelson Richardson (1741–1834) was an American Revolutionary War heroine from Clarendon County, South Carolina. She is known for aiding her husband, Richard Richardson Jr., while on the run from British troops, and for protecting the locations of both him and Francis Marion, whilst being confined, deprived of food, and pressured by British commander Banastre Tarleton and his troops during their occupation of the family plantation.

== Early life ==
Richardson was born in 1741 to Captain James Nelson, an Irish native who operated a ferry on the Santee River. In 1761, she married Richard Richardson Jr., the son of American general Richard Richardson and Mary Cantey, and subsequently moved in with Richardson Jr. at their plantation, near what is now Manchester State Forest, where he worked as a planter.

== During the American Revolutionary War ==
When the Revolutionary War started in 1775, Richardson Jr. was already serving as a captain in his fathers brigade, and a year later, was appointed as captain for another brigade by Colonel Thomas Sumter, after which he spent most his time in battle, before being imprisoned after the surrender at the Siege of Charleston, and later sent to Johns Island, South Carolina. After nearly dying to Smallpox contracted during his imprisonment, he escaped, and fled back to the swamps around the plantation.

Around this time, Tarleton and his troops pillaged and started occupying the family plantation, and confined Dorcas Richardson and her children to a single room, and deprived them of all but the bare minimum amount of food needed for them to survive. Despite the dangers imposed by their captors, Richardson still managed to send some of her food to her husband in the swamps every day, aided by an enslaved person owned by the family, who she trusted. She was also able to send a horse before they were all seized by the British soldiers.

When Tarleton received word regarding Richardson Jr.'s escape, he commanded his regiment to search for him in the surrounding Santee swamp area, a fruitless endeavor, made harder by Richardson's efforts to distract them. Meanwhile, Tarleton and his men started trying to intimidate Richardson, often bragging about his supposed fate at their hands, or by faking confirmations of his death, including by forging fake intelligence reports, and by painting swords with cattle blood, boasting that it was the blood of her husband. Richardson largely ignored these tactics, but is credited to have said in one interaction:

"I do not doubt that men who can outrage the feelings of a woman by such threats, are capable of perpetrating any act of treachery and inhumanity towards a brave but unfortunate enemy. But conquer or capture my husband, if you can do so, before you boast the cruelty you mean to mark your savage triumph! And let me tell you, meanwhile, that some of you, it is likely, will be in a condition to implore his mercy, before he will need to supplicate, or deign to accept yours."

Despite the intimidation, she still continued to provide support and protect her husband, being courageous enough to block soldiers from entering her home by feigning work during one of her husband's few visits, to give him time to escape once more.

Soon after, it was discovered that Richard Richardson Jr. had joined forces with Francis Marion, who was extremely popular with South Carolinian Patriots at the time. Learning this, and realizing he had the best shot at finding Marion, Tarleton almost immediately changed his demeanor and treatment of Richardson, telling her that if she could get her husband to defect from the Continental Army, and reveal the location of Francis Marion, that he would then be awarded by the British promising a pardon, wealth, and promotion within the Royal Army's ranks. Richardson, as before, vehemently refused every offer, and, through his brother, Edward Richardson, who was at the time a British prisoner of war, sent him a message that she was still refusing British demands, and denounced any idea that she and her children were suffering under Tarleton, to give him little reason at all to try and visit the plantation, and risk being captured by British troops.

Richardson continued to aid her husband throughout the rest of the war, even after Tarleton destroyed everything except the buildings on their plantation. After the Revolutionary War ended, Richardson Jr. returned home, and continued his life as a planter, the couple then continued raising their family.

Dorcas Richardson lived to the age of ninety-three, dying in 1834.
