= Fairfax, South Carolina =

Fairfax
- Town
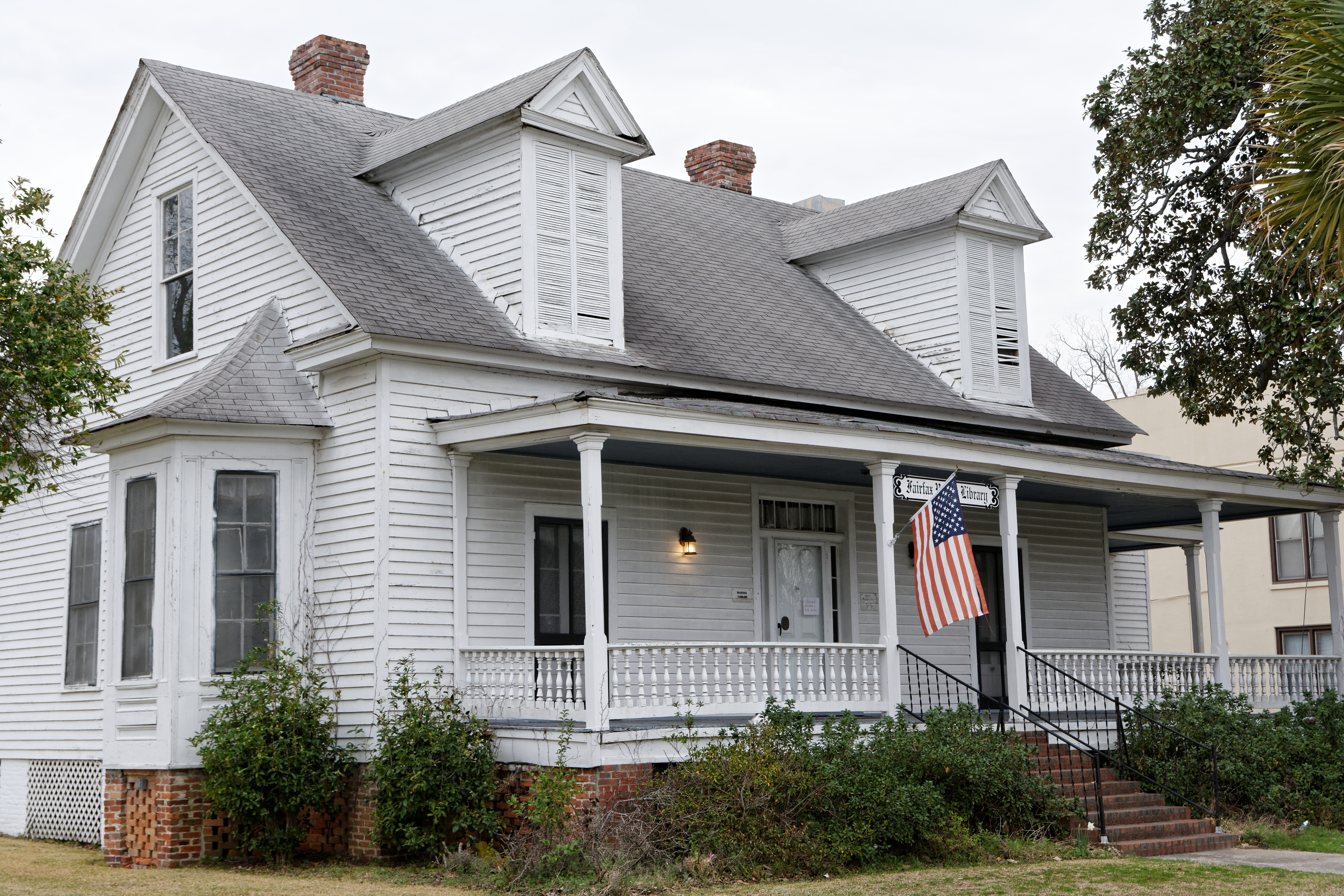
- Virginia Durant Young House in 2017

- Location within South Carolina Location within the United States Location within North America
- Coordinates: 32°57′33″N 81°14′36″W
- Country: United States
- State: South Carolina
- County: Allendale, Hampton

Area
  - Total: 3.31 sq mi (8.58 km^{2})
  - Land: 3.31 sq mi (8.58 km^{2})
  - Water: 0 sq mi (0.00 km^{2})
- Elevation: 135 ft (41 m)

Population (2020)
  - Total: 1,505
  - Density: 454.4/sq mi (175.44/km^{2})
- Time zone: UTC-5 (Eastern (EST))
  - Summer (DST): UTC-4 (EDT)
- ZIP code: 29827
- Area codes: 803 and 839
- FIPS code: 45-24370
- GNIS feature ID: 2406478
- Website: https://www.fairfaxsc.gov/

Fairfax is a town in Allendale County, South Carolina, United States. As of the 2020 census, Fairfax had a population of 1,505.

== History ==
The Virginia Durant Young House was added to the National Register of Historic Places in 1983.

== Geography ==
According to the United States Census Bureau, the town has a total area of 3.3 square miles (8.5 km^{2}), all land.

== Demographics ==
Historical population
Census	Pop.	Note	%±
1900	301		—
1910	499		65.8%
1920	957		91.8%
1930	1,376		43.8%
1940	1,379		0.2%
1950	1,567		13.6%
1960	1,814		15.8%
1970	1,937		6.8%
1980	2,154		11.2%
1990	2,317		7.6%
2000	3,206		38.4%
2010	2,025		−36.8%
2020	1,505		−25.7%
U.S. Decennial Census

=== 2020 census ===
Fairfax racial composition
Race	Num.	Perc.
White (non-Hispanic)	268	17.81%
Black or African American (non-Hispanic)	1,187	78.87%
Native American	7	0.47%
Asian	12	0.8%
Other/Mixed	20	1.33%
Hispanic or Latino	11	0.73%

As of the 2020 United States census, there were 1,505 people, 793 households, and 497 families residing in the town.

=== 2000 census ===
As of the census of 2000, there were 3,206 people, 845 households, and 549 families residing in the town. The population density was 965.8 inhabitants per square mile (372.9/km^{2}). There were 948 housing units at an average density of 285.6 per square mile (110.3/km^{2}). The racial makeup of the town was 25.73% White, 73.46% African American, 0.12% Native American, 0.12% Asian, 0.37% from other races, and 0.19% from two or more races. Hispanic or Latino of any race comprised 0.34% of the population.

There were 845 households, out of which 29.8% had children under the age of 18 living with them, 30.1% were married couples living together, 29.5% had a female householder with no husband present, and 35.0% were non-families. 32.9% of all households were made up of individuals, and 14.7% had someone living alone who was 65 years of age or older. The average household size was 2.46 and the average family size was 3.13.

The town's population was spread out, with 18.8% under the age of 18, 12.4% from 18 to 24, 37.0% from 25 to 44, 20.4% from 45 to 64, and 11.3% who were 65 years of age or older. The median age was 35 years. For every 100 females, there were 180.2 males. For every 100 females age 18 and over, there were 195.2 males.

The median income for a household in the town was $17,083, and the median income for a family was $26,097. Males had a median income of $26,759 versus $19,471 for females. The per capita income for the town was $8,940. About 26.4% of families and 37.8% of the population live below the poverty line, including 49.8% of those under age 18 and 26.9% of those age 65 or over.
