= Eunice Temple Ford Stackhouse =

American clubwoman (1885–1980)

Eunice Temple Ford Stackhouse (December 14, 1885 –February 2,1980) was an American women's club member, author and educator. She is best known for her teaching at Limestone University formerly known as Limestone College, and for her participation in various civic, biracial and social organizations in South Carolina during the Civil Rights era.

== Early life and education ==
Eunice Temple Ford Stackhouse was born in Blenheim, South Carolina. Her commitment to education began at an early age when she graduated at fourteen from Bennettsville high school.

In 1904, Stackhouse graduated with honors from Limestone College. She obtained two degrees, an M.A. and P.h.B from University of Chicago.

== Career ==
Upon graduating Limestone College, Stackhouse began teaching at the university in 1906. She taught ethics, psychology, education and philosophy. Continuing her time at Limestone, she became dean of the faculty for 12 years. Besides teaching, she was an author and created many articles and essays, as well as books, including one about the life of her father.

== Civic organizations ==
Stackhouse was a part of many civil and social organizations like the General Federation of Women's Clubs of South Carolina and served as their vice president. She served as a chair member for various divisions and sections for organizations like the department of education (1936), the adult section (1939) and its division of community service and correctional institutes (1943). She became so dedicated, she opened up her home to have biracial meetings with clubs such as the South Carolina Citizens Committee on Children and Youth in 1947. She belonged to many biracial organizations like the South Carolina council of Human Relations, in an endeavor to improve livelihood conditions.

== Awards and recognition ==
Stackhouse was recognized for her contributions to underprivileged and underrepresented local communities. In recognition for her hard work and dedication for years of service at Limestone University, she was awarded an honorary doctorate in education (Ed.D) in 1932 from the institution. The university later honored her with a dormitory in her name in 1939. In 1969, Limestone University made her dean emerita. She gained the title as "honorary godmother" of the General Federation of Women's Clubs of South Carolina due to her persistence and engagement with the club.

In 1942, Eunice Temple Ford Stackhouse was appointed as the first woman to serve the South Carolina Probation, Pardon and Parole Board by Governor Richard M. Jefferies. She gained attention for her contributions towards racial injustice. After the Supreme Court's Brown vs. Board of Education (1954), she partook in urging South Carolina's residents and community to create unity between parties rather than be segregated.

In 1969, Stackhouse was named woman of the year by the National Society of the Colonial Danes.

== Personal life ==
Stackhouse married her husband, a widower, Thomas Bascom Stackhouse in June 1932. Together, they adopted Eunice's niece Jacqueline Roper Stackhouse, who later followed in Stackhouse's footsteps with education, teaching at Winthrop College.
