= Mary Barnett Poppenheim =

Mary Barnett Poppenheim (September 4,1866-February 12,1936) was a clubwoman, social reformer, and editor who had great influence over women and South Carolina history. After studying at Vassar College, she went on to pursue leadership roles serving as the president of the United Daughters of the Confederacy (UDC), in both the South Carolina and national sectors of this organization. She also spent her time as a writer and editor for the Keystone and the South Carolina Women in the Confederacy where she promoted change for women's advancement in society and became an outlet for newly graduated women. Throughout her career, Poppenheim helped shape the social outlook on female advancement in social and civic life, while preserving the cultural ideas associated with being a southern lady.

== Early life ==
Mary Barnett Poppenheim was born in Charleston on September 4th in 1866. She and her sister were the eldest daughters of Christopher Pritchard Poppenheim, the owner of a well known dry goods store, and Mary Elinor Bouknight. Her father had moved Charleston once the Civil War had ended to continue his business and raise Poppenheim and her siblings, where she lived throughout her life despite moving for university. She was raised and grew up in the post-Civil War and Reconstruction era which was imperative for women's social organizations.

== Education ==
Living in Charleston for majority of her life, she completed preparatory work at the Charleston Female Seminary prior to attending university. After her time at the Charleston Female Seminary, she attended Vassar College in Poughkeepsie, New York. She began attending Vassar in 1882 at the age of 16 making her the first student from South Carolina. Poppenheim's younger sisters followed her to also attend Vassar in later years, and she graduated in 1888. At her time at Vassar she learned the skills and confidence to get her involved in social reform later on in life, and she dedicated the college to all of her accomplishments. Post-grad she joined the Vassar Alumnae Association Southeast and the Intercollegiate Club.

== Career ==
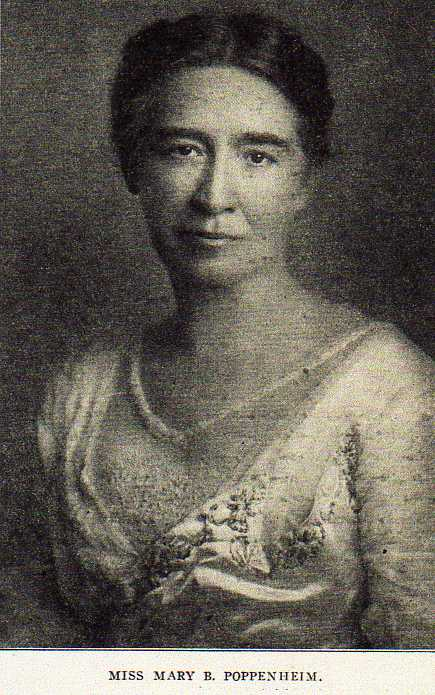
Photo of Mary Barnett Poppenheim used for her memorial at Magnolia Cemetery.

After college, Poppenheim and her younger sister Louisa helped introduce Charleston to the rapidly developing women's club movement. They both became the founding members and officers of the Century Club, the Civic Club, the Intercollegiate Club, and the Charleston city Federation of Clubs. Poppenheim also became involved with the United Daughters of the Confederacy (UDC) organization. This organization was originally formed in 1894 and was reserved for women 16 years or older who were descendants of those who served honorably for the Confederate States of America. It was also created as many women during this time shared similar sufferings and dangers that their male counterparts similarly faced. Poppenheim became a part of the organization and slowly began working her way up as she became the president of the South Carolina division and later from 1917-1919 became the president-general of the national organization. She used the leadership skills she developed from college to become more involved in preserving history and creating spaces for women during this time. In addition to serving as president of this organization, she also was an editor for volumes of South Carolina Women in the Confederacy, which was a collection published by the UDC. As she had a passion for writing and editing published work, she and Louisa were also key roles in the Keystone which served as an outlet for other fellow clubwomen and members of the UDC. These journals and published work are rich sources of information about women's history within South Carolina during this time. It also held important information on the UDC including its values and how it was originally developed. Having ownership of the Keystone helped connect Poppenheim with other young post-graduate women who had close relationships with their alma mater who also had a passion for impacting society. Alongside Louisa, Poppenheim totaled almost 100 years of service and had positions in massive national organizations which she was praised for by the media due to her commitment and dedication. A lot of Poppenheim's time in her career focused on maintaining southern tradition while fighting for women's empowerment and reform in society. Her drive and passion led her work to continue outside of the United States as she guided the UDC to endow hospitals beds at an American military hospital in France during World War 1. During this time she had also spread the UDC into France and organized its own chapter.

== Death ==
Mary Barnett Poppenheim suffered a heart attack while walking in her garden on her property in Charleston, South Carolina. She died at 69 years old and was gone before help had reached her. Poppenheim is buried at Magnolia Cemetery alongside her sister Louisa.

== Bibliography ==
- Johnson, Joan Marie. 2016. "Poppenheim, Mary Barnett, and Louisa Bouknight Poppenheim." South Carolina Encyclopedia. Columbia, SC: University of South Carolina, Institute for Southern Studies
  - This encyclopedia entry is published by a University of South Carolina research institute, so it should be a reliable source. It also covers the topic in some depth specifically about the beginning of her life and getting involved in women's civic, so it's helpful in establishing notability
- Burmester, Barbara. 2006. "Discovering the Legacy of Rhetoric in Nineteenth-Century Women's Private Writings." Rhetoric Review 25(2), pp. 189-211.
  - This is a peer-reviewed academic journal, so it should be a reliable source. It covers the impact her rhetoric had during this time period and establishing women in the world of writing, so it's helpful in establishing notability.
- Winthrop University Archives. Mary Barnett Poppenheim and Louisa Bouknight Poppenheim Correspondence, 1871–1955.
  - These records were published by an accredited university, so it should be a reliable source. It goes into brief detail about her founding of the United Daughters of the Confederacy, so it's helpful in establishing notability.
- The Greenville News. 1936. "Death of Mary Barnett Poppenheim." February 13, 1936. Greenville, South Carolina.
  - This obituary comes from an established regional newspaper, so it should be a reliable source. It covers the cause of her death as well as her accomplishments made prior in her life, so it's helpful in establishing notability.
- Encyclopedia Virginia. 2023. "United Daughters of the Confederacy." Charlottesville, VA: Virginia Humanities.
  - This encyclopedia entry was published by an institutionalized organization, so it should be a reliable source. It goes into detail about her presidency of the UDC and the purpose of this group, so it's helpful in establishing notability.
