= Lily C. Whitaker =

American poet

Lily Candida Whitaker
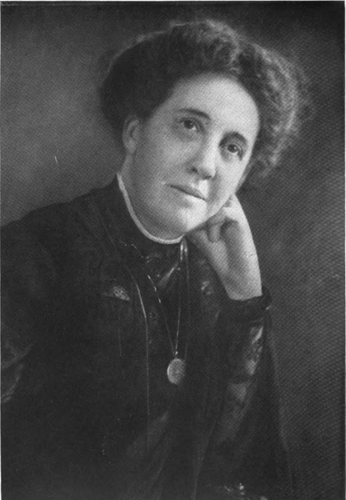
- Born: c. 1850; Charleston, South Carolina, U.S.
- Died: August 23, 1932; New Orleans, Louisiana, U.S.
- Education: St. Simeon's Academy
- Occupations: educator; author
- Relatives: Mary Scrimzeour Whitaker (mother)
- Writing career
- Pen name: Adidnac

Lily C. Whitaker (pen name, Adidnac; c. 1850 – August 23, 1932) was an American educator and author. She contributed to the Southern Quarterly, under her father's direction and wrote for the New Orleans press. In addition to a poetry collection, Donata and Other Poems (1880), and a textbook, Spoken thought : a text book on vocal expression for use in high schools, normal schools and colleges (1927), she wrote several plays. Whitaker was elected president of the New Orleans Educational Association, and served as principal of one of the largest public schools in that city. She founded the first school of speech and oratory in the Southern United States.

== Early life and education ==
Lily Candida Whitaker was born about 1850, in Charleston, South Carolina. Whitaker's father was a man of letters and the editor of Southern Quarterly. Her mother, Mary Scrimzeour Whitaker, was one of the best known writers of Southern literature. Whitaker was reared in an atmosphere of books and culture. Of the six Whitaker siblings, only one other besides Lily survived to adulthood: a younger sister, Ida (d. 1925), who was born in Augusta, Georgia. Since early girlhood, they lived in New Orleans.

They were educated privately and both were graduates of St. Simeon's Academy of New Orleans, where they also did post-graduate work. Whitaker completed the nine-year course in four years' time. Whitaker continued her education abroad after graduating from St. Simeon's.

== Career ==
=== Author ===
Before her education was completed, her literary productions appeared in the leading local journals. She contributed to the Southern Quarterly under their father's direction and for years wrote for the New Orleans Press.

Whitaker's literary style was characterized as being "...full of grace, ideality and imagination, further possessing strength, wit and pathos". Her plays included The Useful and the Beautiful, The Study of the Rainbow, The Earth and the Ocean Peris, The Fate of Narcissus, The Golden Rod, Cupid and Pysche, Among the Stars, One Day in the Legislature, The Hobby Club, The Sunday Law, At the White House, and others numbering fifteen plays, all of which were produced at the New Orleans Grand Opera House with great success. The manager of the New Orleans Grand Opera House stated that Miss Whitaker was the best stage manager he had ever seen. Whitaker adapted her mother's novel, Albert Hastings, to the stage. Whitaker's volume of poems entitled Donata, though written when a girl, won for the writer an enviable reputation. She was also a frequent contributor to the press in New Orleans and elsewhere.

=== Educator ===
Whitaker, at her own expense, gave six receptions to a large circle of acquaintances, at each of which the actors of the day lectured upon some great play, playwright or dramatic epoch. The lectures led social events each season. Whitaker did a great deal of acting, playing such parts as Pauline in the Lady of Lyons. It is said that she was born to be a musician, so decided was her musical talent.

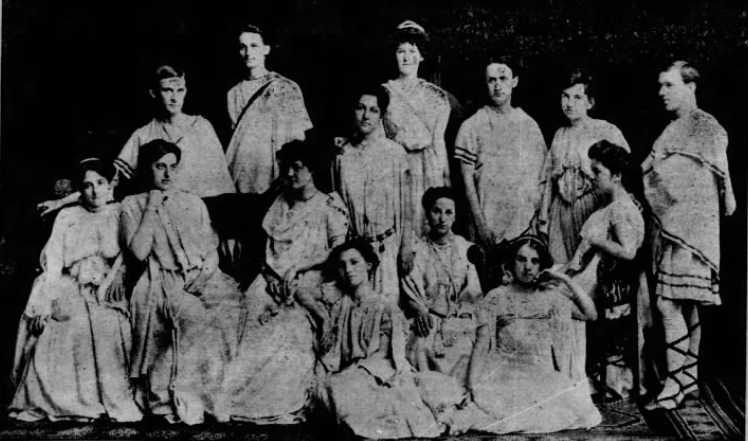
New Orleans College of Oratory and Elocution graduates (1904)

Whitaker, for a number of years, was the principal of McDonough School No. 9. While in charge of the Department of Expression at St. Simeon's School, Whitaker, realizing the increasing demand for the harmonic development of physical, mental and moral faculties, began the instruction of a private class of fifteen pupils at Grunewald Hall. This was in October 1887, and was the primary effort from which the history of the New Orleans College of Oratory and Elocution had its beginning. This class expanded and greatly enlarged, and she added other courses and in January, 1894, the New Orleans College of Oratory was chartered by the Legislature and incorporated. The state charter was granted by the Senate and House of Representatives without a dissenting vote. It was the only school of oratory chartered south of Baltimore. Whitaker had studied oratory under Professor Caldwell and in every school of oratory east of California. The fundamental principle of her school was not to make orators or actors but to develop the talent inherent in the individual; the aim was individuality and originality. Branch schools were established for the benefit of pupils living remote from the college. This normal department by proficiency gained the recognition and approval of the City Board of Education, and credit for work by public school teachers was given there. Associated with Whitaker was her sister, Ida, who held the office of secretary and treasurer and was also on the staff of instructors.

During the World Cotton Centennial of 1884, she wrote articles regarding the fair for Washington, D.C. newspapers. Whitaker was elected second vice president of the Louisiana State Teachers' Association in 1890. In 1894, she was elected president of the St. Simeon's Alumnae Association. In the summer of 1897, she took charge of the department of elocution at the Monteagle (Tennessee) assembly.

In 1907, she attended the National Educational Association meeting in Los Angeles, and then spent some months in the west.

== Later life and death ==
In June 1910, Lily and Ida departed for London on a European sojourn. They spent a week in the English metropolis before departing for Hamburg. They traveled from there to Lübeck and then to Berlin in an automobile. From there, they fared to Munich and to Oberammergau. At Berlin, they attended the Wagner festival. From Oberammergau, the Whitaker sisters traveled through Switzerland and visited Milan, Florence, Venice, and Rome, where they had a private interview with the Pope, and then went up the Rhine to Cologne, thence to Paris. Crossing over the Strait of Dover, they again reached London. They studied paintings of the masters and famous statuary, and visited all the elocution schools they were able to visit and secured valuable data before returning home in October. In July 1913, Lily and Ida went to visit friends in Pasadena, California. Thereafter, Lily would attend the summer school at Stanford University.

The New Orleans College of Oratory and Elocution closed in 1927 due to Whitaker's failing eyesight.

In religion, Whitaker was Catholic.

She died at her home in New Orleans, August 23, 1932.

== Selected works ==
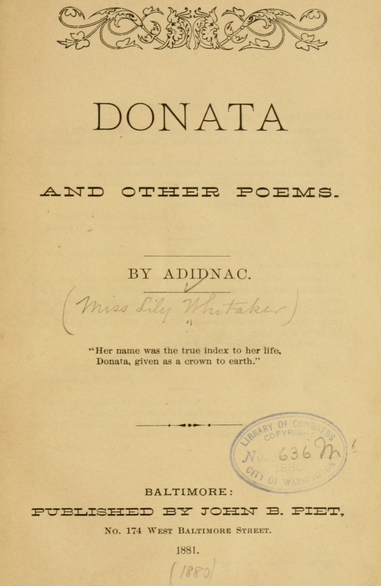
Donata and Other Poems (1881)

=== Poetry collections ===
- Donata and Other Poems (Baltimore, Maryland, 1880)

=== Textbooks ===
- Spoken thought : a text book on vocal expression for use in high schools, normal schools and colleges (1927)

=== Plays ===
- The Useful and the Beautiful
- The Study of the Rainbow
- The Earth and the Ocean Peris
- The Fate of Narcissus
- The Golden Rod
- Cupid and Pysche
- Among the Stars
- One Day in the Legislature
- The Hobby Club
- The Sunday Law
- At the White House
- Dreamland
- Ghosts of Cluna
