= Janie Glymph Goree =

Janie Glymph Goree (January 25, 1921 – January 13, 2009) was the first female African-American to be elected mayor in South Carolina.

== Early life and education ==
Janie Gylmph Goree was born on January 25, 1921 in Maybinton Township, Newberry County, South Carolina. She was born as the youngest of 10 children to parents Orlander and Chaney Glymph, both sharecroppers. Goree worked primarily in the fields with her family, picking cotton for pay. She used these earnings to pay for transport to and from school. Goree spent 11 years in elementary school, since classes were not offered year-round; she also had limited access to education due to segregation laws. Because of the sparse educational opportunities, Goree moved in with other family members and attended high schools near them instead.

Goree graduated with honors from Brainerd Institute in Chester, South Carolina after attending multiple other public schools in the area. She was offered a scholarship at South Carolina State College, but had to decline due to financial issues. Because she could not initially afford college, she worked as a housekeeper to be able to raise funds. When she gathered enough to be able to afford college, she attended Benedict College in Columbia, South Carolina; she was the first of her family to go to college. At Benedict College, she worked several jobs to be able to pay her tuition and doubled up on her courses. Goree was a member of the Gamma Upsilon chapter of the Delta Sigma Theta sorority. She graduated in 1948 Magna Cum Laude and Valedictorian.

After graduation, Goree got a teaching job, however she took time off to get her master’s degree in Basic Sciences and Mathematics at the University of Colorado in 1959. Goree furthered her education later at the University of Notre Dame and the University of Wisconsin.

== Career ==
Goree began her career teaching at Sims High School in Union County, South Carolina, Union’s all Black high school. She later went on to teach at Union County High School as well. She worked as a tutor, taught reading to adults at night, and was a sponsor for extracurriculars. Her teaching career lasted 33 years beginning at Sims High School and ending at Union High School in 1981.

When Goree moved to Carlisle, South Carolina, she worked on the mayoral campaign for her husband, John Williams. When her husband grew ill, Goree ran for the position, winning her second campaign for the seat in 1978. This made Janie Glymph Goree South Carolina’s first female African American mayor.

As mayor, Goree worked greatly to improve the city’s infrastructure. Carlisle had a population of less than 1,000, allowing Glymph to connect with her constituents. After becoming mayor, Goree retired from her teaching job in order to focus on her elected position. Goree credits former Governor of South Carolina, Dick Riley, and senators Strom Thurmond and Fritz Hollings for helping her further develop the town; she had their portraits framed in her office.

Goree was invited to the White House on multiple different occasions and five different presidents of the United States: Gerald Ford, Jimmy Carter, Ronald Reagan, George H. W. Bush, and Bill Clinton.

Goree was an international representative of the World Conference of Mayors, the National Conference of the Black Mayors, and the South Carolina Conference of Black Mayors. Goree founded two annual town-wide events: a Christmas parade, and the “Piggie on a Rock” festival. The earnings from the Piggie on a Rock festival were directed towards the fire department. Goree helped construct the Carlisle Town Hall, a building built and named in her honor. During and after her 22 year long mayoral term, Goree received countless honors and recognition for her altruism and dedication.

== Personal life ==
One of Janie Glymph Goree’s passions was travelling the world with a goal of understanding and connecting with other cultures. Goree visited 6 out of the 7 continents throughout the course of her life, only missing Antarctica.

Janie Glymph Goree was married to Johnny Williams, who died in a traffic accident in the midst of her mayoral race. She married her second husband, Charlie Goree, while mayor. Goree was an active member of Seekwell Baptist Church her entire life, teaching Sunday school and frequently volunteering.

Janie Glymph Goree died at the age of 87 on January 13, 2009, at the Agape Senior Living and Rehabilitation in West Columbia. She was the last of her 10 siblings to survive.
