= Kate Vixon Wofford =

American politician

Kate Vixon Wofford (October 20, 1894 – October 31, 1954) was an educator from South Carolina. In 1922, she became the first woman in the state to hold elected office when she was elected superintendent of schools of Laurens County.

== Biography ==
Wofford graduated from Winthrop College in 1916 and taught at Laurens High School shortly thereafter. At the onset of World War I, she joined the United States Navy as a yeoman, one of the first women to enlist in the war effort. Returning to Laurens after the war, she was elected in 1922 as the county superintendent of schools, becoming the first woman in South Carolina to discharge that role as well as the first woman in the state to be elected to public office. She would serve two terms. She also served a term as the first president of the South Carolina State Teachers Association, and worked as a school principal as well as teacher. She continued her education through Columbia University, from which school she received a doctorate, before becoming head professor and director of rural education at the State Teachers College in Buffalo, New York. She also taught education at the University of Florida, and held a degree from Cornell University.

Winthrop wrote two books on the subject of education, Modern Education in the Small Rural School and Teaching in Small Schools, for which she gained some recognition; she was also published by the National Education Association during her career, and wrote numerous other works on the subject. She was an avid golfer and collected antiques, and was listed in Who's Who during her career.

Wofford is buried in the cemetery of New Prospect Baptist Church in Laurens. A small archive related to her career is held at the library of the University of South Carolina. Wofford Hall, a women's residence hall constructed in 1967 at her alma mater, is named in her honor, and her family presented the school with a portrait of her, painted by a fellow Winthrop alumna, after her death. The school also offers a scholarship in her honor. The third floor north of Rawlins Hall, a women's dormitory at the University of Florida opened in 1958, also bears her name; sections of the hall were named after various significant women in Florida history.

Wofford's brother, Thomas, served as a Winthrop trustee from 1945 until 1953.

== See also ==
- Mary Gordon Ellis, elected superintendent of schools in Jasper County, South Carolina, in 1924; she would become the first woman elected to the South Carolina legislature in 1928
