= Lucy Dugas Tillman =

South Carolina mother, important for women's rights

Lucy Dugas Tillman was a South Carolina mother whose custody case in the early 1900s became a changing point in the history of women's rights and parental authority in the state. Her legal fight created questions about whether a father could use property law to control custody decisions and helped bring public attention to the limits of women's legal protections at the time.

== Early life and marriage ==
Court records show that Dugas was married and the mother of two young daughters. During the marriage, her husband attempted to transfer custody of the children to his parents through a deed recorded during his lifetime. This arrangement removed Tillman from the girls’ care, leading her to petition the courts to regain custody.

== Custody battle and court proceedings ==
Tillman's case Tillman v. Tillman, reached the South Carolina Supreme Court in 1909. The main question was if a father had the authority to assign custody to a third party through a property deed. While such transfers were technically legal at the time, the Court did considered whether they violated constitutional protections and ignored a mother's relationship with her children.

The Court ruled in Tillman's favor. Justices noted that she was a loving and capable parent and that custody decisions must consider fairness, due process and the best interests of the child. The ruling ordered the children returned to Tillman, marking a key moment in defining parental rights in South Carolina.

== Social impact and response ==
The case attracted public attention because it exposed how easily a mother's rights could be overridden by outdated legal practices. Tillman's point to regain her daughters, along with the support of community members who testified to her character, became an example of how women challenged the legal and social constraints of the era.

Writers and historians have since pointed to her case as a turning point. It highlighted the inconsistent protections available to women and the need for broader legal reform. Commentaries also note that the case demonstrated how the courts were beginning to consider maternal rights as more than secondary to parents authority.

== Connection to women’s rights in South Carolina ==
Tillman's custody battle took place during a time when South Carolina women were organizing for greater legal and political power. The state's suffrage movement stretched from reconstruction through the ratification of the 19th Amendment. Activists such as Susan Pringle Frost and the members of the Charleston Equal Suffrage League worked to create more spaces for women's education, civic participation and legal protections. Eulalie Chaffe Salley, a prominent suffragist in South Carolina, states that the custody battle was what sparked her initial fire for Woman's rights and reformation.

Historians argue that Tillman's case added momentum to these efforts. It drew attention to the lack of legal rights for women and helped illustrate the need for reform. Leaders such as Eulalie Chafee Salley later became central figures in advancing women's equality in the state, and narratives like Tillman's contributed to the broader public conversation about women's autonomy and justice.

== Legacy ==
Although not widely known today, Lucy Dugas Tillman's case remains an important example of early 20th century legal challenges faced by women in South Carolina. Her successful fight for custody helped shape the conversation around parental rights and the treatment of mothers under the law. It also became part of the larger history of women who worked, in public and private ways, to secure greater fairness and equality.
