= League of Women Voters of South Carolina v. Alexander =

- Court: South Carolina Supreme Court
- Full case name: League of Women Voters of South Carolina v. Alexander, et al.
- Argued: June 24, 2025
- Decided: September 17, 2025

Case history
- Argument: Oral argument
- Opinion announcement: Opinion announcement

Questions presented
- Does partisan gerrymandering violate the South Carolina Constitution?

Holding
- Partisan gerrymandering claims present a nonjusticiable political question.

Court membership
- Judges sitting: John W. Kittredge, Chief Justice; John Cannon Few, George C. James, D. Garrison Hill, Letitia H. Verdin, Justices

Case opinions
- Majority: James, joined by Few, Verdin
- Concurrence: Kittredge, joined by Hill

League of Women Voters of South Carolina v. Alexander was a 2025 South Carolina Supreme Court case regarding political gerrymandering.

== Background ==
After the 2020 census, South Carolina redistricted its 7 congressional districts. The new plan contained 6 Republican leaning districts and 1 Democratic leaning district, the majority black 6th congressional district. In the 2018 midterm elections the coastal 1st congressional district was narrowly won by the Democratic nominee, who then narrowly lost to Republican Nancy Mace in the 2020 elections. After this the South Carolina General Assembly drew the new 1st congressional district to be more Republican, leading to a nearly 14 point victory for Mace in 2022. The South Carolina Conference of the NAACP challenged the congressional map as a racial gerrymander in Alexander v. South Carolina State Conference of the NAACP. South Carolina argued that the map was gerrymandered for political reasons, not racial reasons, and that federal courts cannot adjudicate political gerrymandering claims since Rucho v. Common Cause. A three-judge panel initially ruled that the 1st district was racially gerrymandered, but was overturned by the United States Supreme Court in a 6–3 decision in May 2024, leaving the current map in place.

In July 2024, the League of Women Voters of South Carolina filed a lawsuit against the congressional map, claiming that it was a partisan gerrymander in violation of the South Carolina Constitution. The South Carolina Supreme Court agreed to hear the case in its original jurisdiction in October 2024. Oral arguments were held on June 24, 2025.

== Decision ==
The South Carolina Supreme Court announced its decision on September 17, 2025. In a 5–0 decision, it ruled that partisan gerrymandering claims were not justiciable under the South Carolina Constitution. It rejected the claims that the state Free and Open Elections Clause, Equal Protection Clause, Free Speech Clause, or other provisions of the state constitution prohibited partisan gerrymandering. The majority opinion frequently cited to the U.S. Supreme Court's Rucho v. Common Cause decision in which the Court held that partisan gerrymandering claims are nonjusticiable under the federal constitution. The majority stated that "There are no constitutional provisions or statutes that pertain to, prohibit, or limit partisan gerrymandering in the congressional redistricting process in South Carolina.

Chief Justice John W. Kittredge wrote a concurring opinion, joined by Justice D. Garrison Hill, in which he agreed with the majority and expressed concern about the growing intensity of partisan gerrymandering across the country and suggested that the trend will continue unless the United States Supreme Court issues another decision on partisan gerrymandering. Additionally, he wrote that he does not view the majority's decision as creating a categorical rule that precludes any future cases alleging excessive partisan gerrymandering, writing that "It remains conceivable that a future challenge may present more fully developed constitutional violations with a discernible nexus to manageable judicial standards, thereby warranting judicial intervention."

== See also ==
- League of Women Voters of Pennsylvania v. Commonwealth of Pennsylvania
