= Lottie Gibson =

Social activist (1930–2016)

Greenville County Council
- In office 1992–2016

Personal details
- Born: June 27, 1930 Seneca, South Carolina
- Died: December 18, 2016 (aged 86)
- Education: West Virginia State College (BA) Atlanta University School of Social Work (MA)
- Occupation: Social worker
- Awards: Jefferson Award

Lottie Gibson (June 27, 1930 - December 18, 2016) was an American social activist who worked with underprivileged families in Greenville, South Carolina.

== Early life and education ==
Gibson was born in Seneca, South Carolina, the daughter of Joseph A. Beal and Pauline Harrison Beal. She had three siblings. In her early childhood her family moved to West Greenville, where Gibson resided through her adolescence.

Lottie attended Sterling High School, a historically black high school in West Greenville. Of her three siblings, Gibson was the first to go to college. She attended West Virginia State College where she studied drama and English and participated in student council and many other organizations. Gibson was a founder of the NAACP youth chapter there. She also pledged a sorority, Alpha Kappa Alpha. She became one of the 16 charter members and the third president of the Epsilon Tau Omega Chapter.

== Family ==
Gibson met her husband, Dr. W. F. Gibson, while she was working for the United Service Organizations. He was a dentist, and his office was in the same building as the director of the OSU. They had three sons and one daughter. At the time of her death in 2016, she had ten grandchildren, and three great grandchildren.

Gibson attributed her inspiration for going into social work from her mother, but her husband also played a large role in supporting her.

== Career ==
Gibson’s first job out of college was a women and girls worker at Phyllis Wheatly Community Center. She stayed there for two years before transferring to get her graduate degree at the Atlanta University School of Social work. She also worked at the Department of Social Services in Spartanburg, before receiving her graduate degree.

Gibson returned to Greenville, South Carolina, and started her career at the United Service Organizations. She served as the director for over eight years. Following this job, Gibson went on to teach at Greenville Tech, where she also served as a director of the TRiO program. She served there for over 30 years.

Gibson served as a chairperson on the Board of Directors of the Sunbelt Human Advancement Resources Inc. She also served District 25 on the Greenville County Council for over 25 years. She served on various committees such as the Development Committee, Public Safety and Human Services Committee. Gibson served as an active councilwoman for the South Carolina Council of Educational Opportunity Program.

Gibson was a life member of the NAACP as a freedom fighter. She was a founding member of the Democratic Women of Greenville County. Her work consisted of participating in protests, providing human resources, and advocating for rights. One of her accomplishments was her helping Martin Luther King Jr. Day be recognized as a holiday in Greenville county.

== Awards and recognition ==
Gibson received the Jefferson Award in recognition of her public service. She was portrayed as "one of the most outstanding, selfless, community servants I've ever known." Being relentless in her devotion towards others, she was seen as the "go-to" person people went to if they needed to solve a problem.

Gibson died on December 18, 2016. In that same year, the Phoenix Center, which was a treatment center for those with dependency issues, was named “Lottie Beal Gibson Center of Excellence” to honor her work aiding people who struggle with addiction.

In 2024, a bill was passed to name a portion of Highway 25 after Councilwoman Lottie B. Gibson to serve as a lasting memorial.
