= Donella Brown Wilson =

American educator and community leader (1909–2018)

Donella Brown Wilson (May 24, 1909 – January 12, 2018) was an American educator, civil-rights advocate, and long-time community leader in South Carolina. Wilson was the recipient of many honors, awards, and citations. Wilson was awarded the Order of the Palmetto South Carolina's highest civilian honor, by Governor Henry McMaster in 2017.

== Early life and education ==
Donella Brown Wilson was born May 24, 1909, to Henry and Minnie Bryant Brown on the Peterkin Plantation in Fort Motte, Calhoun County, South Carolina. Her parents worked as sharecroppers on the land that her enslaved grandparents had previously worked.

Wilson did not have formal schooling locally; she taught herself to read by studying a Sears & Roebuck catalog and listening to her grandmother read the Bible. Her grandmother also supported her early literacy through prayers and reading the Bible. Wilson's father died in the early 1910s, causing her mother to move the family first to Charleston and then to Columbia, South Carolina. Minnie Brown pushed Donella to get an education and higher learning. Wilson joined the NAACP when she was in the 8th grade and later attended Booker T. Washington High School in Columbia. In 1933, she earned her teaching credentials at Allen University and became a teacher in Fort Motte in a one-room schoolhouse.

== Teaching career and activism ==
Wilson taught in the rural counties of South Carolina, including Lexington and Orangeburg. In the 1940s, after the NAACP successfully fought for equal pay for Black teachers, most notably in Duvall v. Seignous and Thompson v. Gibbes, Wilson and her husband, who was also a teacher, asked for sick leave and additional compensation comparable to that of white teachers; the school district refused. Neither of their Lexington teaching contracts were renewed as a result. Wilson later joined Roberts High School in Holly Hill, Orangeburg County, where she taught for nearly two decades. She retired in 1971 after 40 years of teaching, .

On August 10, 1948, Wilson stood in line as one of the first Black citizens in the Ward 9 precinct to vote in the Democratic primary after the cases Elmore v. Rice and Brown v. Baskin ended the all-white primary in South Carolina. Ever since then, Wilson voted in every state, local, and national election without missing a single election for over 70 years. She became a living resource: journalists, historians, and community projects went to her to recount the changes in civil rights and voting over the decades. Wilson was a symbol of the changes that occurred over time.

== Legacy ==
Later in life, Wilson shared her stories and experiences through interviews, lectures and local heritage projects. In 2011, she was featured in the AT&T African American History Calendar. In 2017, Governor Henry McMaster awarded her the Order of the Palmetto. At 108 years old, Donella Brown Wilson passed away in 2018, surrounded by her family. Wilson helped educate thousands of students and was an active member of her community.
