= Allison Marsh =

American historian

- Occupation: Historian

Academic background
- Education: Swarthmore College; Johns Hopkins University
- Thesis: The Ultimate Vacation: Watching Other People Work, The History of Factory Tours in the United States, 1890-1950.

Academic work
- Discipline: History
- Sub-discipline: Public History, History of Technology
- Institutions: Smithsonian Institution; University of South Carolina

Allison C. Marsh is an American public historian of technology. Marsh is an associate professor in the Department of Women's and Gender Studies at the University of South Carolina with interests in gender representation in museums and women in engineering. She is the co-director of the Ann Johnson Institute of Science, Technology & Society.

== Education and career ==
In 1998 Marsh graduated from Swarthmore College with a B. S. in engineering and a B. A. in history. She received her PhD in the history of science, medicine, and technology from Johns Hopkins University in 2008.

She worked in technical consulting at Andersen Consulting during its transition to Accenture.

From 2006 to 2008 Marsh was Curator and Winton M. Blount Research Chair at the Smithsonian Institution National Postal Museum.

In 2008, Marsh was appointed assistant professor in the History Department at the University of South Carolina. She directed their public history program from 2015 to 2019. She was tenured and promoted to associate professor in 2016. She became one of the founding co-directors (along with Leah McClimans) of the Ann Johnson Institute for Science, Technology & Society in 2017. In 2024 she transferred her tenure to the Department of Women's and Gender Studies.

== Public history work ==
While at the Postal Museum, Marsh was the lead curator for the exhibitions "Disaster: Response and Recovery" and "Out of the Mails" and a team member of the "Systems at Work" exhibition. She wrote a number of Object Spotlights, such as ones for the Schermack Stamp Vending Machine, a letter from Nathanael Greene attempting to procure supplies for George Washington's army at Valley Forge, the Transorma Mail Sorting Machine Sign, and a prototype for a US Postal Bag. She also wrote a number of entries for the museum's online collection database.

At the University of South Carolina, Marsh was the chief curator for the NSF funded exhibition "Imaging the Invisible" at the campus' McKissick Museum. She oversaw student work on a number of exhibitions, including "The Guantanamo Public Memory Project." In preparation for the Guantanamo Bay exhibit, Marsh took a group of graduate students to GTMO over spring break in 2015 to collect oral histories with base residents.

Marsh was the consultant for the YouTube Series Crash Course: History of Science narrated by Hank Green.

Since 2018 she has written the "Past Forward" column for IEEE Spectrum. Each month she chooses a museum object in the history of computer or electrical engineering and tells its history. In 2020 she began conducting oral histories with pioneering women in the history of microwave science and engineering, including Linda Katehi, Maria Rzepecka Stuchly, and Rhonda Franklin. The oral histories are maintained by the IEEE History Center and published on the Engineering and Technology History Wiki (ETHW).

== Academic history work ==
Marsh wrote The Factory: A Social History of Work and Technology, a textbook that traces the history of the factory from small cottage workshops through the Industrial Revolution to the modern clean room.

She wrote an academic paper with Bethany Johnson on using Crash Course in an introductory undergraduate history of science course. They compared using the video series versus a textbook. Based on their study, students who watched the videos retained more content as assessed by their final exams.

Marsh published an invited series biographical essays on women in the IEEE Journal of Microwaves. These were based on her oral histories and supplemented by additional sources.

During the 2024-2025 academic year, Marsh was the NEH Fellow in residence at the Linda Hall Library. She researched women in the early decades of electrical engineering by combing through the journals of the IEEE and its predecessor organizations, the AIEE and the IRE. In April 2025, when her NEH fellowship at the Linda Hall Library was terminated early due to changes implemented by the Trump administration, she published an essay on why engineers need the humanities.

In 2026, Marsh joined the Humanities & Social Justice Advisory Committee - Wiki Education Foundation.

== Awards and honors ==
In 1998 Marsh was awarded a Watson Fellowship, which allowed her to spend a year in Europe researching industrial tourism.

Marsh's article “Greetings from the Factory Floor: Industrial Tourism and the Picture Postcard,” published in the October 2008 issue of Curator: The Museum Journal, won the 2010 Rita Lloyd Moroney Award from the U. S. Postal Service for scholarship on postal history.

Marsh was the 2010 recipient of the Brooke Hindle Postdoctoral Fellowship in the History of Technology awarded by the Society for the History of Technology.

In 2013 Marsh was the Goldman Sachs Senior Fellow in the National Museum of American History's engineering collections.

In 2014 IEEE-USA honored Marsh and Lizzie Wade with the Distinguished Literary Contributions Furthering Public Understanding and Advancement of the Engineering Profession award for "outstanding journalistic effort in returning prominence to the historical significance of the Smithsonian Institute‘s engineering collection."

In 2017 Marsh was named a Senior Member of the IEEE.

The History of Science Society awarded Marsh the 2020 Joseph H. Hazen Education Prize for promoting discussion of science's social and cultural relations and bringing this understanding to others worldwide.

In 2025 the American Society of Business Publication Editors awarded her the National Azbee Silver Medal in the category of "All Content Regular Column" for her "Past Forward" column and the National Azbee Gold Medal in the category of "Online Video Series" for her videos “A Brief History of Color Television.”

In 2026, Marsh was awarded the Presidential Fellowship in Bibliography from the Linda Hall Library.
