= Emily Jane Liles Harris =

American farmer and writer (1827–1899)

Emily Jane Liles Harris (1827–1899) was a farmer and writer whom lived in Spartanburg, South Carolina. Emily was the only daughter of Amos Liles and Sarah Daniels. Her father Amos, who was also farmer as well as a slave owner, while her mother, Sarah, stayed home and tended to the children. When Emily was 13, her family moved to Fairforest, South Carolina and settled on a farm with their slaves.

== Education ==
When Harris and her family moved to Fairforest, her father, Amos wanted his only daughter to have an education so he sent her to the Spartanburg Female Academy (also known as the Spartanburg Female Seminary) when she was 13. Harris studied under Pheobe Paine, who was a schoolteacher from Windham, Maine. Paine strongly believed that women should be educated. In the 1980s, Phillip Racine transcribed Emily's journals and says that he could see Paine's influence in Emily's writing and that it showed elegance and emotion. You can see this emotion in her journal entry's when she is writing while her husband is gone and she has no choice but to write her feelings down.

== Marriage and later life ==
On April 3, 1846, Emily married David Golightly Harris (1824–1875). Together they had nine children. David was the only son of a thriving farmer and real estate investor. Before the Civil War, David was a small slaveholder in Spartanburg, South Carolina. David's father gave him 50 acres so he would be able to start his own farm. Same with Emily, she inherited her father's farm and five of his slaves. Together, the two had 1,000 acres of land and ten slaves. From 1855 to 1870, David kept a journal in which he described the life of a slaveholder and small town Spartanburg farmer, as well as what he thought about emancipation and the Confederate defeat.With all of these slaves and land they had together David became a leader in society and politics which gave way to lots of connections for the family. The money and land gave them a step up in the farmer's class.

In 1862, David joined the state militia which left Emily to take care of the farm by herself. During this time, she continued David's journal and wrote about her time taking care of the farm. She mentioned how the burden of being in charge was very heavy on her and how she lacked self-confidence. Some of the responsibilities Emily had were, supervising the slaves, oversaw the responsibility of the animals, planted and harvested crops, she also dealt with the taxes and accommodating the farm to the weather conditions.

== End of life ==
In 1865, David returned home for good during the end of the Civil War. When he got back there were some financial troubles due to the abolition of slavery which was the majority of their wealth and labor. It got to be too much trouble and David ended up splitting the farm into 50-acre plots and rented it to other farmers. It ended up not working out and Emily, David, and their children had to sell some of their land.

David Harris passed away in 1875 which left Emily and their children to take care of the farm. But this is until Emily passed on March 26, 1899. She was buried in the family cemetery in Spartanburg County.
