= Frances Ravenel Smythe Edmunds =

American preservationist (1916–2010)

- Born: December 11, 1916; Charleston, South Carolina
- Died: April 30, 2010 (aged 93); Charleston, South Carolina
- Occupation: Preservationist
- Years active: 38
- Organization: Historic Charleston Foundation
- Spouse: S. Henry Edmunds
- Parents: Augustine Thomas Smythe (father); Harriott Ravenel Buist Smythe (mother)

Frances Ravenel Smythe Edmunds (December 11, 1916 - April 30, 2010), was a major part of the preservationist movement in South Carolina and the United States through her work as the director of the Historic Charleston Foundation, up until her retirement in 1985. Throughout her career, she received national recognition, an array of awards, and made an impact on historical preservation in Charleston as well as the United States.

== Personal life ==
Edmunds was born in the city of Charleston, South Carolina to parents Augustine Thomas Smythe and Harriott Ravenel Buist Smythe. Her father had a substantial reputation as a lawyer in the state, and she grew up with three brothers. During her formative years, she attended St. Timothy's School in Stevenson, Maryland. She later went on to attend and graduate from the College of Charleston with a Bachelor's degree. In 1943 she married S. Henry Edmunds. Henry Edmunds worked as both a lawyer in Charleston as well as a District Attorney. The two eventually went on to have three daughters. Despite being such a prominent figure in the preservation movement of the city, Edmunds's family had only been native to Charleston for one generation. She died in the city on April 30, 2010.

== Career ==
Prior to her marriage, Edmunds briefly worked at The Evening Post. She started her career as a preservationist in 1948 by becoming a volunteer for the Historic Charleston Foundation. Later on, she was hired onto the project as the foundation's first ever staff member. Eventually, Edmunds worked her way up in the foundation and was appointed as the organization's director in 1955. She believed that preservation is a philosophy that views cities as masterpieces, and that these masterpieces must have most of their parts to ensure that future generations will be able to appreciate them and their history. She concluded her career as a preservationist when she retired from the Historic Charleston Foundation in 1985. She spent a total of 38 years at the organization.

== Awards ==
Edmunds went on to receive national recognition for her dedication to preserving, restoring, and revitalizing the city of Charleston. She was given the Louis E. du Pont Crowninshield Award from the National Trust for Historic Preservation in 1971, which is known as the highest preservation award in the nation. Edmunds received a multitude of awards at both the local and regional level, and was also granted an honorary doctorate from the College of Charleston in 1972. In 1979, she was appointed to the Advisory Council on Historic Preservation by United States president Jimmy Carter. Additionally, she also received the Department of Interior's Conservation Service Award. On top of these accomplishments, she was the first ever woman that was able to serve as a trustee of Montacello, and was a key member of the Garden Club of America. She spent time serving on both the board of the Spoleto Festival and the Advisory Board of the Confederate Home and College, as well as Charleston's Board of Architectural Review.

== Projects ==
During her time at the foundation, Edmunds pioneered a multitude of projects that cemented her place in the twentieth-century preservationist movement in America. One of her earliest and most notable projects was the revitalization of Ansonborough. Ansonborough was once an elegant neighborhood in the city of Charleston, but had rapidly declined in condition and was in an execrable state by the 1950s. In 1957, Edmunds took part in the initiation of the foundation's revolving fund, which was the very first of its kind in the nation. The fund was/is used to purchase historical properties in the city, sell them with protective covenants, and then eventually reinvest the money into neighboring pieces of property, which in turn helped to revive the neighborhood of Ansonborough. Edmund's approach with the revolving fund added an entirely new aspect to preservation as a whole, which contrasted the traditional approach of focusing on individual landmarks. This became known as a purchase-sell-control system, and it ensured the preservation of some of Charleston's most beautiful and historic buildings. Due to this project's success, Charleston was given an increasing amount of visibility and the foundation's methods were adopted by multiple other cities across the nation. Edmunds and the foundation's techniques and work proved to be so impactful that it was later showcased in a government report, which eventually led to the passage of the National Historic Preservation Act in 1966.

In the 1970s, Edmunds felt it was important that historic buildings and neighborhoods that were in lesser condition were not taken over by landlords who would remain absent, and knew that it was important to keep historic buildings in use, even if that meant a change in their usage. Therefore, she along with the foundation decided to create and launch a new project that focused on the renovation of these deteriorated neighborhoods while ensuring that they were not displacing residents from their homes. Some of the other projects that she pioneered were a major revision to Charleston's 1931 ordinance, the start of the expansion of Charleston's Historic District, and preserving Broad Street as the city's legal center. Edmunds specified the importance of Charleston being a livable city, and therefore promoted height and tourism ordinances. In 1977, she utilized her communications to the city mayor and other notable figures to help bring the Spoleto Festival to Charleston. Additionally, she made it a point that the foundation be involved in the purchase as well as stabilization of Drayton Hall. One of her more controversial efforts was her support of the trimming down of the Charleston Place development. Overall, Edmunds's work during her time as the director of the Historic Charleston Foundation helped to make Charleston, South Carolina a national preservation model.
