= Elaine Nichols =

Historian and museum curator

- Born: April 3, 1941 (age 85)
- Education: University of North Carolina, Charlotte Case Western Reserve University University of South Carolina
- Occupation: Curator
- Employer(s): South Carolina State Museum National Museum of African American History and Culture

Elaine Nichols (born April 3, 1941) was the Supervisory Curator of Culture at the Smithsonian Institution National Museum of African American History and Culture (NMAAHC).

== Early life ==
Nichols was born in Charlotte, North Carolina on April 3, 1941. Nichols was raised alongside her five siblings to Susie Johnson and Floyd Sanders. Her mother was a domestic worker, and her father was the janitorial supervisor at a local bank. When Nichols was 4 years old, her childhood home caught on fire. Her home and all of her photographs were lost; this began her interests in preserving family history.

Nichols majored in Political Science at the University of North Carolina- Charlotte. Nichols received a Masters of Arts in Social Administration and planning from Case Western Reserve University in Cleveland, Ohio. She attended the University of South Carolina Columbia, where she earned her Masters of Arts in Public Service Archaeology.

== Career ==
In 1989, Elaine Nichols served as a guest curator at the South Carolina State Museum. Nichols contributed to the exhibition "The Last Miles of the Way: African American Funeral and Mourning Customs in South Carolina, 1890-Present," which received attention internationally. TIME magazine dedicated a page and a half covering the showcase, which featured approximately 100 Black South Carolinians and their traditions. Nichols used artifacts from African American funerals to show how their culture created meaning and community, despite living in oppressive social conditions. Later, she was promoted to curator of history, assisting in the establishment of the museums collection of several different artifacts related to Africans Americans as well as the Palmetto state.

In 2009, Nichols became the supervisory curator of culture at the Smithsonian's National Museum of African American History and Culture (NMAAHC) in Washington, DC. One of her significant pieces of work belonged to her work in placing the garment Rosa Park's wore on December 1, 1955, the day of her arrest in Montgomery, Alabama. Among 3,000 artifacts at the NMAAHC, this item is included for its historical significant with an event that occurred in the modern Civil Rights Movement.

== Selected publications ==
- "Madame C.J. Walker: Meaningful Beauty." In Smithsonian American Women: Remarkable Objects and Stories of Strength, Ingenuity, and Vision from the National Collection. Pope, Victoria and Schrum, Christine, editors. 94–95. Washington, DC: Smithsonian Books. 2019
- "Great Promises and Unfulfilled Hopes: The Legacy of Benjamin Franklin Randolph." In Dream A World Anew: The African American Experience and the Shaping of America. Conwill, Kinshasha H., editor. 95–101. Washington, DC: Smithsonian Books. 2016
- "Sharecropping." In Dream A World Anew: The African American Experience and the Shaping of America. Conwill, Kinshasha H., editor. 107–115. Washington, DC: Smithsonian Books. 2016
- "The Afro-American Newspaper: Reporting on the Marvelous and the Mundane." In Dream A World Anew: The African American Experience and the Shaping of America. Conwill, Kinshasha H., editor. 179–185. Washington, DC: Smithsonian Books. 2016
- "Decked Out Accordingly: The Adornment of African American Women from Enslavement to the Mid-Twentieth Century." In Smithsonian 2013 Folklife Festival. Smithsonian Center for Folklife and Cultural Heritage, editor. 32–33. Washington, DC: Smithsonian Institution. 2013
- "The Voyage of Robert Smalls." In Smithsonian Civil War: Inside the National Collection. Kagan, Neil and Hyslop, Stephen G., editors. 344–345. Washington, D.C.: Smithsonian Books. 2013
