= Mother Mary Baptista Aloysius =

Irish-born Ursuline nun

- Born: Ellen Lynch; 1823; Cheraw, South Carolina
- Died: 1887 (aged 60–61)
- Burial place: The Basilica of Saint Peter, Columbia, South Carolina, U.S.

Mother Mary Baptista Aloysius Lynch (1823–1887) was an Irish-born Ursuline nun and the founding superior of the Ursuline community in Columbia, South Carolina. She is known for her leadership during the Civil War as she helped establish the Ursuline Convent and Academy in Columbia. She became a prominent religious figure in the region. Her legacy left a strong impact through her work in education, her connections to Bishop Patrick Lynch, and her role during the 1865 Burning of Columbia.

== Early life and religious vocation ==
Mother Mary Baptista Aloysius Lynch was born Ellen Lynch in Cheraw, South Carolina in 1823. She was born into a well-established slave-holding family from Ireland. Baptista was born to her father, Conlaw Peter Lynch, who had designed and built the Town Market Hall, St. Peter's Catholic Church. The Lynch family was allowed freedom to practice their faith because of their position as "the leading Catholic family of Chesterfield District." She joined the Ursuline Sisters as it was the beginning of her religious life and was later moved to Cincinnati in 1848. She professed before the Ursuline Convent as Baptista Aloysius in 1850. She was then moved again to St. Martin's in Fayetteville, Ohio. She became connected to the Catholic Diocese of Charleston through her brother, Bishop Patrick Lynch, in 1858.

== Work in Columbia ==
Lynch arrived in Columbia as the founding superior of the Ursuline community. She helped establish the convent and school and led the community's educational and religious work during the mid-nineteenth century. She oversaw the sisters' teaching work and supported the growth as they continued to build a presence in the city.

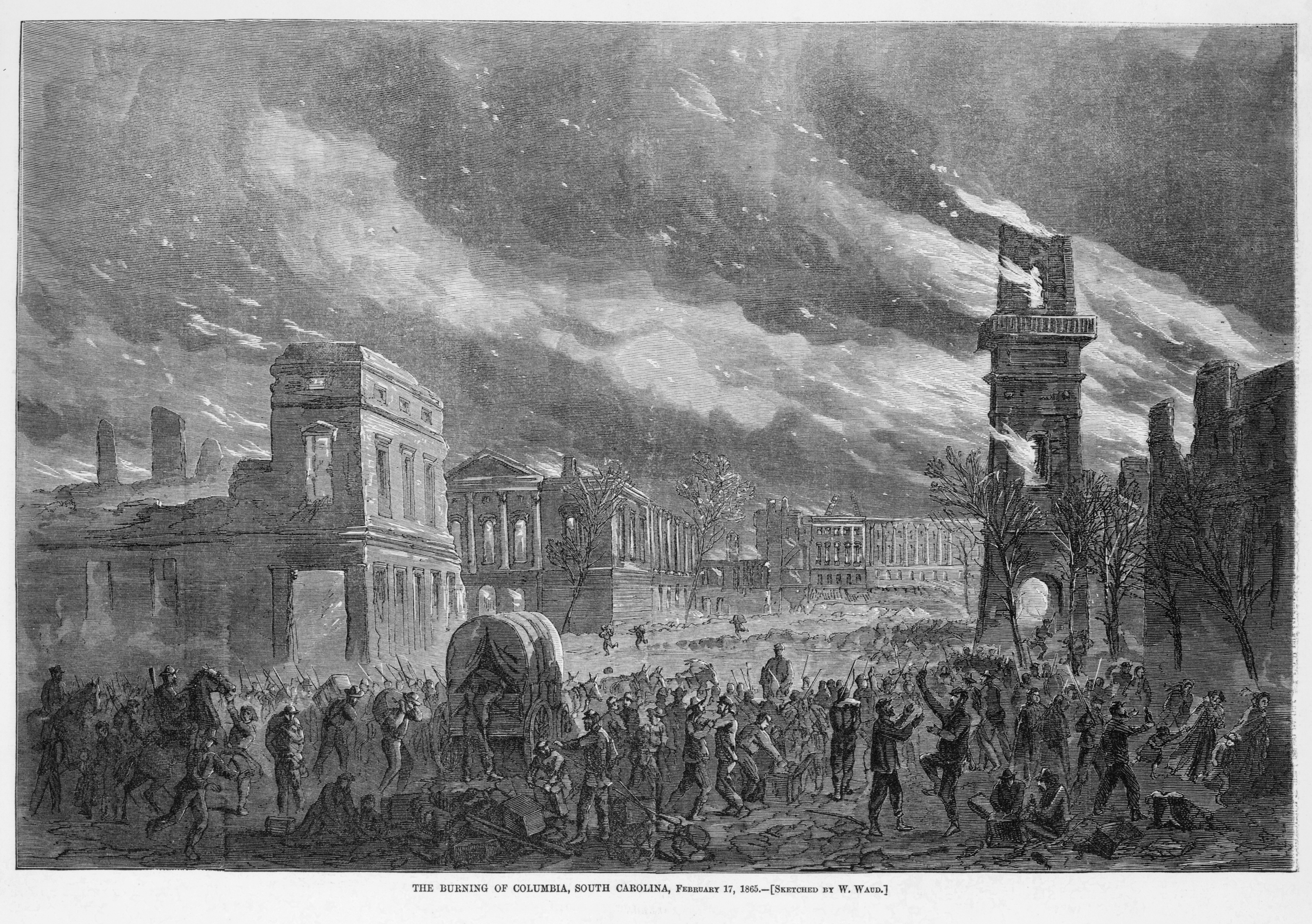
The burning of Columbia, South Carolina, February 17, 1865.

During the Civil War, Lynch pleaded to General William T. Sherman, to protect the covenant from destruction, but nonetheless, the Ursuline Convent was destroyed in the 1865 Burning of Columbia after Shermans men took it upon themselves to break in to the convent to loot and light fire to the convent.

Mother Baptista and her students were temporarily forced to relocate, having found and built a new convent at the Hampton-Preston House.

From 1858 until 1887, she served as mother superior in Columbia at Ursuline Convent and Academy.

== Later life and legacy ==
After the war, Lynch continued her work with the Ursuline Sisters as they rebuilt the community. Her leadership helped shape the development of the Ursuline community and Catholic life in South Carolina.

She died in 1887 and was buried in Columbia, South Carolina. Local historical records from the Basilica of St. Peter document her burial in Columbia and recognize her continued influence on Catholic education after the war.
