= Mary Scrimzeour Whitaker =

American litterateur

- Born: Mary Scrimzeour Furman; February 22, 1820; Beaufort, South Carolina, U.S.
- Died: March 12, 1906 (aged 86); New Orleans, Louisiana, U.S.
- Occupations: litterateur; author; poet; essayist; novelist; critic
- Spouses: John Miller (m. 1837; died 1837); Daniel Kimball Whitaker (m. 1849; died 1881)
- Children: Lily C. Whitaker
- Relatives: Sir William Miller, 1st Baronet (brother-in-law)
- Writing career
- Notable works: "Sacrifice of Iphegenie"; "Farewell to Scotland"

Mary Scrimzeour Whitaker (née, Furman; after first marriage, Miller; after second marriage, Whitaker; February 22, 1820 – March 12, 1906) was an American litterateur, author, poet, essayist, novelist, and critic. Born in South Carolina, she became a writer of New Orleans. Her written works include Poems and Albert Hasting, the first Southern novel published after the American Civil War. She was a typical "daughter of the South", and in everything she wrote, this characteristic was evident. After completing her education in Europe, she almost immediately began writing for magazines and Northern periodicals, contributing thousands of articles to the press. One of her most widely copied poems was a classic called the "Sacrifice of Iphegenie"; another, "Farewell to Scotland", thought written when she was but eighteen years of age, is a good example of her poetic productions.

== Early life ==
Mary Scrimzeour Furman was born February 22, 1820, in Beaufort district, South Carolina. Her father, Rev. Professor Samuel Furman, son of the Rev. Dr. Richard Furman, of Charleston, South Carolina, is a clergyman of the Baptist religion. Her mother, whose maiden name was Ann or Eliza Scrimzeour, was of Scottish descent, and traced her lineage to Sir Alexander Scrimgeour, celebrated in Scottish story, whose descendants, in the male line, were hereditary standard-bearers of the kings of Scotland.

Her father having removed from Beaufort to Sumter District, she passed the early part of her life at the High Hills of Santee. She gave early indications of possessing a poetic temperament, and pieces composed by her at the age of ten and twelve years were prophetic of her abilities. She pursued her studies of literature at home. As she grew up, she developed a fondness for society. She was devoted to history, and her father's library furnished her with the best sources of information. She read rapidly, was in the habit of drawing her own inferences, and of writing comments and criticisms upon the most striking passages she read. Among the poets, Alexander Pope and Thomas Campbell were her favorites and models. Pope's translation of the Iliad and Odyssey of Homer were the constant companions of her childhood; and she read them so often, and was so struck with their numerous beauties, that, even as an adult, she retained whole scenes in her memory. Whitaker was an admirer of Felicia Hemans and Letitia Elizabeth Landon, as well as Walter Scott and Robert Burns.

== Edinburgh ==
In 1837, she, with her parents and three of her brothers, visited Edinburgh, her mother being entitled to a large estate in Scotland, then in litigation, and which she finally recovered. There, Whitaker hoped to meet and marry an English gentleman, and with that goal in mind, she planned, shopped, and packed her trunks with new clothes. They took lodgings in a fashionable portion of the New Town, Edinburgh. Here, her brothers Richard, John, and William attended the University of Edinburgh, while she received an education under private tutors.

She passed her time surrounded by friends, among whom were Thomas Campbell, the poet; the William and Robert Chambers, editors of Chambers's Edinburgh Journal, Professor John Wilson, editor of Blackwood's Magazine; Professor George Moir; William Tait, editor of Tait's Edinburgh Magazine; John Hill Burton, the historian; Mary Howitt, and other notables.

She contributed her first poems to the Scottish press under the auspices of Thomas Campbell, and these were favorably reviewed by the critics of that city. Campbell was so pleased with Whitaker's poetry that he encouraged her not to neglect her gift, and complimented her highly, calling her "his spiritual daughter". Some of her fugitive pieces were published, at the time, in the quarterlies of Great Britain. She often referred to her visit to Scotland, where she spent nearly two years, as the most golden period of her life.

While in Edinburgh, she formed an acquaintance with a young and distinguished advocate of the Scottish Bar, of high connections, John Miller, Esq., of Edinburgh (brother of Hon. William Miller, later a member of the British Parliament) whom she married in 1837. At the time, John was a special pleader at the Scottish bar.

== The Bahamas ==
After receiving the appointment of Attorney General of the British West Indies, his commission having been signed by Queen Victoria, who had just ascended the English throne, they embarked for Nassau, New Providence, Bahamas, by way of Barbados. Immediately after his arrival there, he was seized with yellow fever and died. Lady Miller, who came down with the same disease, recovered from it, and returned in a Government vessel to South Carolina.

== Back to the South ==
Widowed three months after her marriage, her life was tinged with sadness several of the subsequent years. Gradually, she returned to society where the youthful widow was very popular and accomplished. In 1849, after twelve years passed in widowhood, almost exclusively devoted to literary studies and pursuits, she again married. Daniel Kimball Whitaker, Esq (1801-1881), was a native of Massachusetts, but a resident of Virginia.

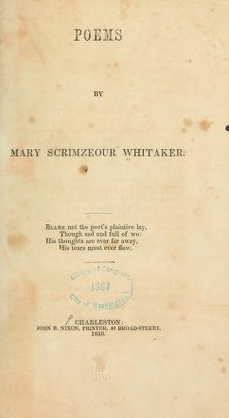
Poems (1850)

In 1850, Whitaker collected and published a volume of her Poems (Philadelphia, 1850), which were highly commended by critics, particularly by William Cullen Bryant. Her lyrical effusions were characterized by pathos, tenderness, spirit and fire, although the majority of her effusions were tinged with the seriousness that naturally resulted from episodes in her early life. The tributes to "Scott", "Byron", "Campbell", "Caravaggio", "Miss Landon", and "Mrs. Hemans", are among the most finished of her compositions. Previous to the civil war, Mrs. Whitaker was, for some time, a regular contributor to the Philadelphia magazines, writing under her own name, regarding a pen name as foolish, and not being ashamed to claim the authorship of anything she wrote herself, nor willing that it should be claimed by others. Together, they edited Whitaker's Magazine: The Rights of the South.

== Civil war ==
At the outbreak of the war, the Whitakers lived in Richmond, Virginia. Prof. Whitaker's sympathies were with the South and he cast his lot with the Confederacy. During the first few years of the war, Prof. Whitaker served in the department service of the government and later enlisted in the Confederate army.

== New Orleans ==
In January 1866, the Whitakers moved to New Orleans. Many of her best pieces, written since Poems was published, (several of them elicited by the scenes of the war and the gallantry of the generals upon the battlefield), were scattered in the newspapers and periodicals of the day. The critical articles on the poets from the days of John Dryden to those of Alfred, Lord Tennyson, which appeared editorially in the Sunday issue of The Times newspaper in New Orleans during the year 1866, and which were greatly admired for their acumen and terseness, were written by Whitaker. She served as the editorial critic of the New Orleans Times for seven years.

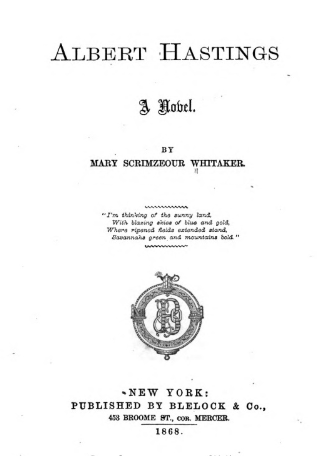
Albert Hastings (1868)

Albert Hastings (1868) was her first extended effort in the department of novel-writing. Her vivid descriptions of the scenery of the West Indies, and of the epidemics which annually kill so many of its inhabitants, contained in Albert Hastings, were suggested by her visit to that region. Atala was her second novel.

== Personal life ==
The Whitakers had six children, two of whom, Ida (born in Augusta, Georgia) and Lily (born in Charleston, South Carolina), survived to adulthood.

Mary Whitaker died at her home in New Orleans, March 12, 1906.

== Selected works ==
- Poems, 1850
- Albert Hastings, 1868
- Atala

=== Poems ===
- "Sacrifice of Iphigénie"
- "Farewell to Scotland"
