= Frances Guignard Gibbes =

American playwright and poet

Frances Guignard Gibbes Keith (October 12, 1870 – October 4, 1948) was an American playwright and poet. She was the first woman to enroll at South Carolina College, now named the University of South Carolina.

== Early life and education ==
Gibbes was born on October 12, 1870, in Columbia, South Carolina. Her parents were Jane Allen Mason and Wade Hampton Gibbes, and she had a brother named Frank H. Gibbes. She grew up in the Southern United States, with ancestry from Virginia and the Carolinas. As a girl, she attended private schools.

In 1893, the South Carolina General Assembly "mandated that women should be allowed to attend [South Carolina College] as special students". Two years later, the college's Board of Trustees made the decision to allow female students into the school. At the time, Gibbes wanted to become a writer, so she applied to South Carolina College after the general assembly passed the bill. Later that year, on September 24, 1895, Gibbes received permission to take a course.

The president of the school, James Woodrow, wrote to Gibbes' father, advising her to withdraw due to the fact that she was the only woman to have registered for classes. Woodrow further explained in his letter that faculty and students were against having women enter the college, and that it would be an uncomfortable experience if Gibbes entered the school.

Gibbes decided to continue with her plans to attend the college, and became the first woman to enroll at the school. She attended classes at South Carolina College from 1895 to 1899, leaving without a degree. Afterwards, she moved to Washington, where she lived with a friend, worked, and continued to write.

Gibbes later lived in Boston, where she studied drama and poetry under Josephine Peabody.

== Career ==
Her first published work was Book of Poems, which contained 37 of her poems and was released in 1902. The critical reception of the work was positive. Writer Maurice Egan said her work was "exquisitely musical" and stated, "No sweeter, truer renderings of the impressions made by a bird than her 'The Mocking Bird' is to be found in all American literature."

After the publishing of her first work, she did not write much for the next 15 years. During that time, she worked on settling her father's estate. She also married, had a child, and recovered from an illness. In 1922, her one-act play "Jael" won the Town Theater prize in Columbia, South Carolina. A year later, she won a state-wide play competition for her one-act play "The Stranger".

In 1923, she wrote a tragedy play titled "Hilda", which contained four acts and was written in blank verse. The plot was set when the first Christian messenger arrived in the ancient English kingdom of Bernicia, and contained a love story with the Christian messenger's cousin, Hilda. The work received praise from critics when it was reviewed in The London Times and American newspapers.

"Hilda" also received mixed reviews. The New York Times stated that "it is worthy of more than passing attention", but that it was "a dramatic poem rather than a play, for although it is built up through scenes and acts, it lacks sufficient action for the stage." The Saturday Review of Literature critiqued the work, stating that the play's "two themes are not brought to an emulsion and that is one of several reasons why, in spite of some poetic spurts, the little drama just tries and tries again to the final curtain."

Gibbes' play, "The Face", was published in 1924 by Brentano's. The play was written in blank verse, and its plot is set during the time period when Leonardo da Vinci was painting the Mona Lisa and The Last Supper. The first professional production of "The Face" was held at the Palm Beach Playhouse in Palm Beach, Florida. "The Face" also was produced in New York and was praised by poet Archibald Rutledge.

Gibbes wrote two sonnets that were published by Avon House. One of her sonnets, "Articulate", was included in their books Dictionary of Modern Poets and Crown Anthology, which were published around 1938. Her sonnet titled "Royalty" was printed in Avon House's book, Outstanding Poets of 1938.

Her 1946 play, "Dawn in Carolina", was set in South Carolina in the early 1600s. She attributed her inspiration for the work to her late husband and friends who encouraged her to write about her home state.

== Personal life and death ==
Gibbes married Oscar Lovell Keith, a romance languages professor at the University of South Carolina. Their daughter, named Frances Gibbes Keith, was born in 1913. Her daughter went on to become an actress, occasionally acting in her mother's plays when they were staged in South Carolina.

Gibbes attended the Trinity Episcopal Cathedral in Columbia, South Carolina. She was a member of various organizations in Columbia and the greater South Carolina area, including the Columbia Arts Association, Drama Club, Quill Club, Columbia State Society and South Carolinian Society, as well as the National Arts Club of New York. She was active in her community, and a supporter of the arts and women's suffrage.

Gibbes died on October 4, 1948, at her home in Columbia. She was buried the next day at the Elmwood Cemetery. In 1950, Gibbes' unpublished autobiography titled Lucy, A Novel was discovered posthumously at the University of South Carolina's library.

== Selected works ==
- Book of Poems (1902)
- "Jael" (1922) - one-act play
- "The Stranger" (c. 1923) - one-act play
- "Hilda" (1923) - four-act play
- "The Face" (1924)
- "Up There" (1932) - three-act play
- "The Strange Woman" (c. 1939)
- "Dawn in Carolina" (1946)
