= League of Women Voters of South Carolina =

US political organization

- Formation: 1920; 106 years ago
- Type: Nonprofit
- Purpose: Political education and advocacy
- Location: South Carolina, United States
- Website: https://my.lwv.org/south-carolina-state

The League of Women Voters of South Carolina is a political organization in the US state of South Carolina that promotes political education and engages in political advocacy within the state. The League hosts candidate forums with candidates for local elections. The group began as the South Carolina Equal Suffrage League founded in 1915 and reorganized after passage of the Nineteenth Amendment to the United States Constitution. The organization is affiliated with the League of Woman Voters of the United States.

== Early history ==
The group traces its history back to the South Carolina Equal Suffrage League, founded in 1915. After the passage of the Nineteenth Amendment to the United States Constitution, the group reorganized itself in 1920 into the South Carolina League of Women Voters, and continued to advocate for women's issues in the state. In 1921, the League published a booklet named The New Voter with a detailed description of the US political system and advice for women voters.

By the 1940s, the League was no longer active. In 1947 and 1948, three new Leagues of Women Voters were founded in the cities of Charleston, Columbia, and Spartanburg. Leagues were forming in the cities of Chester and Sumter when delegates voted unanimously in 1951 to form a new state League of Women Voters.

== Activities ==
The League advocated in favor of the ratification of the Equal Rights Amendment, and continues to advocate for it now.

Liz Patterson, a member of the League, represented South Carolina's 4th Congressional District from 1987 to 1993.

In 2009, the League sued a land developer named Smith Land Company, claiming that the developer had not gotten permits required by the South Carolina Pollution Control Act before filling coastal wetlands. The case found its way to the state's Supreme Court, which ruled in favor of the League.

In 2024, the League brought an unsuccessful suit against the state of South Carolina in League of Women Voters of South Carolina v. Alexander, accusing the state of partisan gerrymandering.

The League opposes bans on abortion and laws restricting bathroom access for transgender people. The League's vice president spoke at the No Kings rallies at the South Carolina State House in October 2025 and March 2026.

== Local leagues ==
The League of Women Voters of South Carolina has a presence in the form of local leagues in:

- Anderson County
- Beaufort Area
- Charleston Area
- Columbia Area
- Darlington County
- Florence County
- Georgetown County
- Greenville County
- Hilton Head Island–Bluffton Area
- Horry County
- Oconee and Pickens Counties
- Orangeburg County
- Spartanburg County
- Sumter County
- York County
