= List of justices of the South Carolina Supreme Court =

Below is a list of justices who have served on the South Carolina Supreme Court.

Justice	Began active service	Ended active service	Notes
David Gordon Baker	1935	1956	Became chief justice in 1943
Elihu H. Bay	1791	1838	-
Donald W. Beatty	2007	2024	Became chief justice in 2017
Eugene Satterwhite Blease	1926	1934	Became chief justice in 1931
Milledge Lipscomb Bonham	1931	1943	Became chief justice in 1940
James M. Brailsford Jr.	1962	1974	-
Aedanus Burke	1796	1799	-
E. C. Burnett III	1995	2007	-
Thomas P. Bussey	1961	1975	-
Jesse F. Carter	1927	1943	-
A. Lee Chandler	1984	1994	Became chief justice in 1994
Thomas P. Cothran	1921	1934	-
William Drayton Sr.	1789	1789	-
Benjamin Faneuil Dunkin	1865	1868	-
John Cannon Few	2016	2026	-
Ernest A. Finney Jr.	1985	2000	Became chief justice in 1994
Edward Ladson Fishburne	1935	1954	-
Thomas B. Fraser	1912	1925	
George W. Gage	1914	1921	-
John P. Gardner	-	-	-
Eugene B. Gary	1894	1926	Became chief justice in 1912
George Gregory Jr.	1975	1991	Became chief justice in 1988
John Faucheraud Grimké	1783	1819	-
David W. Harwell	1991	1994	Became chief justice in 1992
Alexander Cheves Haskell	1877	1879	-
Kaye Gorenflo Hearn	2009	2022	-
D. Garrison Hill	2023	Incumbent	-
Solomon L. Hoge	1868	1869	-
Daniel E. Hydrick	1909	1921	-
George C. James	2017	Incumbent	-
David Johnson	-	-	-
Ira B. Jones	1896	1912	Became chief justice in 1909
John W. Kittredge	2008	Incumbent	Became chief justice in 2024
Lionel K. Legge	1954	1961	-
James Woodrow Lewis	1961	1984	Became chief justice in 1975
C. Bruce Littlejohn	1967	1985	Became chief justice in 1984
Alva M. Lumpkin	1926	1934	-
John Hardin Marion	1921	1926	-
Samuel McGowan	1879	1894	-
Henry McIver	1877	1903	Became chief justice in 1891
James E. Moore	1991	2008	-
Franklin J. Moses Sr.	1868	1877	-
Joseph Rodney Moss	1956	1975	Became chief justice in 1966
Julius B. Ness	1974	1988	-
Josiah J. Evans	1835	1852	Left off to become a United States Senator
Abraham Nott	-	-	-
John Belton O'Neall	-	-	-
George Dewey Oxner	1944	1962	-
Costa M. Pleicones	2000	2017	Became chief justice in 2016
Young J. Pope	1891	1909	Became chief justice in 1903
John Rutledge	1791	1795	Became chief justice in 1791; Resigned to serve as Chief Justice of the United States
William Dunlap Simpson	1880	1890	Became chief justice in 1880
John G. Stabler	1926	1940	Became chief justice in 1935
Taylor Hudnall Stukes	1940	1961	Became chief justice in 1956
Claude A. Taylor	1944	1966	Became chief justice in 1961
Jean H. Toal	1988	2015	Became chief justice in 2000
Letitia H. Verdin	2024	Incumbent	-
John H. Waller	1994	2008	-
Richard C. Watts	1912	1930	Became chief justice in 1927
Ammiel J. Willard	1868	1880	Became chief justice in 1877
Charles Albert Woods	1903	1913	-
Jonathan Jasper Wright	1870	1877	-
Robert Wright	1725	1739	Became chief justice in 1725
