= State v. Quattlebaum =

- Court: South Carolina Supreme Court
- Full case name: The State of South Carolina, Respondent, v. Robert Joseph Quattlebaum, Appellant.
- Decided: January 24, 2000
- Citation: 527 S.E.2d 105; 338 S.C. 441

Court membership
- Judges sitting: Jean H. Toal, James E. Moore, John H. Waller, E. C. Burnett III, William T. Howell (Note: Filling vacancy)

Case opinions
- Decision by: Burnett
- Concurrence: Toal, Moore, Waller, Howell

Keywords
- Admissible evidence; Witnesses

State v Quattlebaum (338 S.C. 441, 527 S.E.2d 105) is a 2000 decision of the South Carolina Supreme Court. The case is notable for having established the precedent that a defendant may, with restrictions, call the prosecuting attorney as a witness.

== Particulars ==
James was arrested for a variety of charges including capital murder and was sentenced to death at trial. During pretrial investigations, the defendant was questioned and polygraphed in an interview room that was monitored and videotaped. Subsequent to his interview, the defendant was allowed to confer with counsel in the same interview room, with detectives and prosecutors listening in a remote location.

The appeal focused on whether the prosecutor, having heard privileged communication, should have been allowed to continue involvement in prosecution of the case and whether the defendant, having been made aware of the breach of privilege, should have been allowed to impeach the prosecution based on said breach.

== Findings ==
The court found:

Because a deputy solicitor of the 11th circuit solicitor's office eavesdropped on a privileged conversation between appellant and his attorney, we reverse appellant's conviction...
