= C. Bruce Littlejohn =

American judge

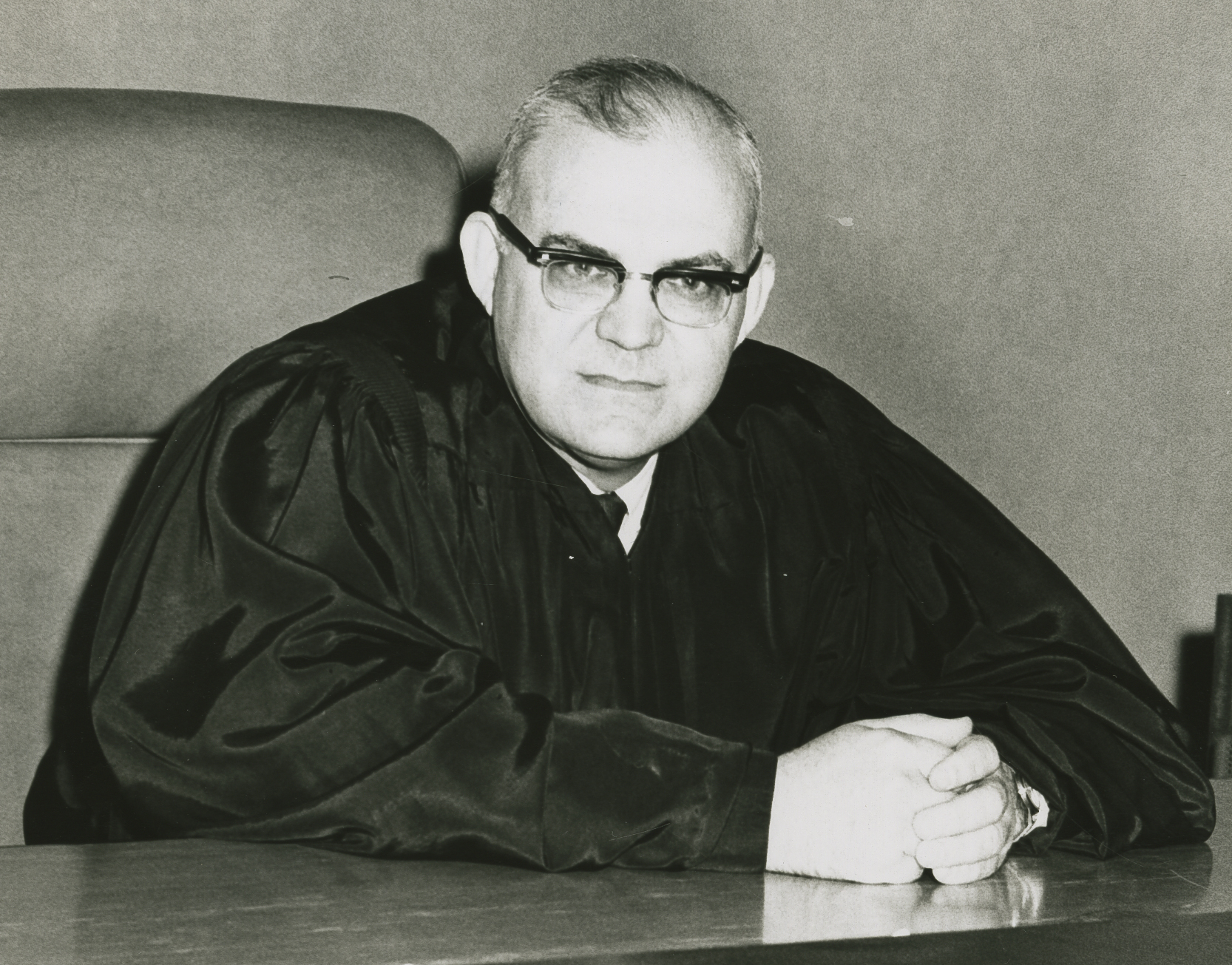

Chief Justice of South Carolina
- In office March 7, 1984 – 1985
- Preceded by: James Woodrow Lewis
- Succeeded by: Julius B. Ness

Associate Justice of South Carolina
- In office January 25, 1967 – 1984
- Preceded by: Joseph Rodney Moss
- Succeeded by: A. Lee Chandler

52nd Speaker of the South Carolina House of Representatives
- In office 1947–1949
- Preceded by: Solomon Blatt Sr.
- Succeeded by: Thomas H. Pope Jr.

Member of the South Carolina House of Representatives
- In office 1937 – 1943, 1946-1949
- Constituency: Spartanburg County

Personal details
- Born: July 22, 1913 Pacolet, South Carolina
- Died: April 21, 2007 (aged 93) Pacolet, South Carolina
- Spouse: Inell Smith
- Children: Inell Littlejohn Allen and Cameron B. Littlejohn, Jr.]]
- Education: Wofford College (1933), University of South Carolina (J.D., 1936)

Cameron Bruce Littlejohn (July 22, 1913 – April 21, 2007) was a chief justice of the South Carolina Supreme Court. He served as an associate justice on the same court from 1967 to 1984.

C. Bruce Littlejohn was born July 22, 1913, in Pacolet, South Carolina, to Lady Sarah Warmoth and Cameron Littlejohn. He was the youngest of eight children. He graduated from Wofford College in 1933 after having studied English and Political Science. He went on to get his LL.B. from the University of South Carolina Law School in 1936. He served four consecutive terms as the Representative for Spartanburg County in the South Carolina General Assembly from 1937 to 1943. He resigned to enlist with the U.S. Army where he spent the majority of his time in the Quartermaster Corps. After the Japanese surrender, he also helped prosecute war criminals in the Philippines as a part of the United Nations War Crimes Commission. He returned to the South Carolina House of Representatives in 1946 and served as Speaker of the House from 1947 to 1949, replacing Representative Solomon Blatt. He stepped down from the General Assembly on September 14, 1949 and assumed the position of resident judge of the Seventh Circuit Court - an election he had won against state Senator Bruce White and Representative Arnold Merchant.

Justice Claude A. Taylor died on January 20, 1966, and was replaced as chief justice by Joseph Rodney Moss; Littlejohn announced his intention to run for the newly empty seat vacated by Moss. Following more than one year of indecisive balloting by the Statehouse, on January 25, 1967, he was elected an associate justice of the South Carolina Supreme Court beating out Judge Julius B. "Bubba" Ness, state Senator Rembert C. Dennis and former Governor George Bell Timmerman. In 1984, he was elected chief justice, succeeding Chief Justice J. Woodrow Lewis. After completing Justice Lewis's unexpired term, he was elected to a full term in 1984. He retired in 1985 upon reaching the mandatory retirement age of 72.

Littlejohn died on April 21, 2007. He is buried the Pacolet First Baptist Church.

Littlejohn received honorary degrees from Wofford College (1968), Converse College (1985), the University of South Carolina (1986), and Limestone College (1990). He also was a prolific writer, authoring four books: Laugh with the Judge (1974), Littlejohn's Half-Century at the Bench and Bar (1987), Littlejohn's Political Memoirs (1989), and Littlejohn's South Carolina Judicial History: 1930-2004 (2005).
