= Julius B. Ness =

American judge

Julius B Ness

Chief Justice of South Carolina
- In office June 18, 1985 – February 1988
- Preceded by: C. Bruce Littlejohn
- Succeeded by: George Gregory, Jr.

Associate Justice of South Carolina
- In office December 5, 1974 – June 18, 1985
- Preceded by: James M. Brailsford, Jr.
- Succeeded by: Ernest A. Finney, Jr.

Personal details
- Born: February 27, 1916 Manning, South Carolina
- Died: November 12, 1991 (aged 75) Bamberg, South Carolina
- Spouse: Katherine Ness (née Rhoad) (m. 1946)
- Children: Gail Richardson (née Ness); Richard Benjamin Ness
- Relatives: Julius N. Richardson (grandson)
- Education: University of South Carolina

Julius Ness (February 27, 1916 – November 12, 1991) was the Resident Circuit Judge for the Second Judicial Circuit of South Carolina.

== Life ==
He was born in Manning, South Carolina, the eldest of five children of Morris and Rae Levy Ness, on February 27, 1916. His family moved to Denmark, South Carolina, when he was a young boy, and his mother and father lived there until their deaths. He had two brothers, Harold and Arthur, and two sisters, Sylvia and Rita. His friends and family knew him as "Bubba", a name given him by one of his younger sisters because she could not pronounce Julius.

Ness graduated from Denmark High School, then the University of South Carolina. He graduated from academic school in 1938 and law school in 1940. Upon graduation from law school, he moved to Bamberg, South Carolina, where he lived until his death in 1991. Ness initially practiced with the late State Senator J. Carl Kearse, at a salary of US$30 per month.

In 1941, Ness enlisted in the United States Armed Forces. He first attended flight school, but did not complete the training. Upon leaving flight school Ness, with lifelong-friend, W. E. "Pete" Brooker, joined the United States Army, where Ness earned the rank of captain, in the 349th Infantry of the 88th Division. He was critically and permanently injured in 1944 while serving in the snow-covered mountains of Italy. Against orders, his friend Pete went back onto the battlefield and found and rescued Ness. When the surgeon inspected his wounds, Ness was told his leg would have to be amputated. At the prospect of losing his leg, Ness drew his Colt, Model 1911 or M1911, .45 caliber, semi-automatic sidearm and threatened that if he woke up without his leg, he would kill the doctor that took it. The doctors did not attempt the amputation, and after many months of recuperation, Ness went home to Bamberg. For his service, he was awarded the Bronze Star, Silver Star, and two Purple Heart medals. Ness went back to work with Senator Kearse, and the firm later became known as Kearse and Ness.

Ness married Katherine Rhoad in January 1946. He was heavily involved in Bamberg County community activities, and in 1954, he was elected to represent the Second Judicial Circuit, on the South Carolina Highway Commission. He stayed on the commission and acted as Chairman in 1956. That same year, when Senator Kearse retired from the South Carolina Senate, Ness was elected, in an unopposed election, and he served until 1958. In 1958 Ness went on the bench as the Resident Circuit Judge for the Second Judicial Circuit.

Ness was elected as an associate justice of the South Carolina Supreme Court and sworn in on December 5, 1974. Ness was elected to be the chief justice of the South Carolina Supreme Court in June 1985, was sworn in on June 18, 1985, and retired in February 1988 upon reaching the mandatory retirement age of 72.
