= Edward Ladson Fishburne =

American judge

Associate Justice of South Carolina
- In office April 17, 1935 – January 1, 1954
- Preceded by: John G. Stabler
- Succeeded by: Lionel K. Legge

Personal details
- Born: November 4, 1883 Walterboro, South Carolina
- Died: January 30, 1964 (aged 80)
- Spouse: Mary Gage
- Education: The Citadel

Edward Ladson Fishburne was a South Carolina state supreme court justice and grandson of Lieutenant Governor Merrick E. Carn. He graduated from The Citadel in 1904 and taught school for two years afterwards. He later entered the legal profession of his father, William Josiah Fishburne, a distinguished South Carolina lawyer. After his father's death, he took a partner named Major Madison P. Howell, a longtime friend. He also served as Walterboro mayor, like his grandfather, and as a state militia officer. He was appointed to the office of associate justice of the South Carolina Supreme Court on April 17, 1935, which he held for some 19 years until 1954.

He married Ms. Mary Gage, the daughter of South Carolina Associate Supreme Court Justice George W. Gage of Chester. The Fishburnes had two biological children and adopted four others.

In 2003, the South Carolina Chief Justice Jean H. Toal met with the family to unveil a portrait of the late justice.
