= William Luther Rhodes =

American judge

William Luther Rhodes, Jr.

Associate Justice of South Carolina
- In office August 14, 1975 – 1980
- Preceded by: James Woodrow Lewis
- Succeeded by: David W. Harwell

Personal details
- Born: May 14, 1918 Loris, South Carolina
- Died: April 8, 1986 (aged 67)
- Spouse: Elizabeth Rentz Dubose

William Luther Rhodes Jr. (May 14, 1918 – April 8, 1986) was an associate justice of the South Carolina Supreme Court. Rhodes was elected to the South Carolina Supreme Court in 1975. He was sworn in on August 14, 1975, to replace Justice Lewis as an associate justice. Served in South Carolina House of Representatives from 1951 to 1960m as chairman of ways and means, and as Judge South Carolina Fourteenth Judicial Circuit from 1960 to 1975. He was reelected to a full ten-year term in 1978.
