= Edward Lee Elmore =

American man convicted of murder

Edward Lee Elmore (January 13, 1959 – December 3, 2018) was an intellectually disabled man who was convicted and sentenced to death for the 1982 rape and murder of Dorothy Edwards, a wealthy South-Carolinian. He is notable for being South Carolina's longest-serving death row inmate—having served 29 out of 31 years in prison on death row—and for substantial criticism surrounding his prosecution. He was removed from death row in 2010 after the U.S. Supreme Court held in Atkins v. Virginia that the execution of the mentally disabled constituted cruel and unusual punishment. He was released from prison after being sentenced to time served after an Alford plea on March 3, 2012.

Elmore maintained his innocence throughout the entirety of his legal battles, and his case has been widely criticised as a miscarriage of justice with many organizations claiming his innocence. The story of his numerous trials and appeals was told in Anatomy of Injustice: A Murder Case Gone Wrong by Pulitzer Prize-winning journalist Raymond Bonner.

== Early life ==
Elmore was born on January 13, 1959, and grew up in the small town Abbeville, South Carolina. He struggled significantly in school, repeating first grade twice and failing second grade before finally completing it. He did not finish third grade until he was 12 and withdrew from school entirely at 15 while still in fifth grade. Throughout his life, he exhibited severe cognitive impairments; IQ tests administered in 1971, when he was 12, yielded scores of 72 and 58.

Edward worked as a handyman around Greenwood, being trusted to do chores in affluent neighborhoods.

== The murder of Dorothy Edwards ==
On January 18, 1982, Dorothy Edwards was found dead in her bedroom closet in Greenwood, South Carolina. She was found by Jimmy Holloway, her neighbor who had let himself into her house after finding her newspapers stacking up outside. Forensic pathologist Dr. Sandra Conradi, who performed the autopsy of Ms. Edwards' body, later testified that the victim had been stabbed multiple times in the head, neck, and chest, sustaining over 70 injuries, including defensive wounds, fractured ribs, and vaginal abrasions.

Elmore had been previously hired by Dorothy Edwards to clean her gutters and wash her windows. During their investigation of the murder scene, the police found a check written to Elmore for $43 from weeks earlier and found Elmore's thumbprint on the outside back door frame to Edwards's house. Elmore immediately became a suspect, and he was arrested and charged.

=== First trial ===
Elmore's first trial began less than 90 days after the victim's body was discovered. Public defender Geddes D. Anderson represented Elmore, prosecutor William T. Jones III represented the state, and E.C. Burnett III was the presiding judge.

The prosecution's case relied on Sandra Conradi's testimony and Earl Wells who claimed that pubic hairs found on Edwards's bed matched Elmore's “to a very high degree of probability.” A state forensic serologist testified that Type A blood was found on jeans recovered from Elmore's room.

Two state police officers testified that Elmore said if he had killed Edwards, he did not remember it. Jailhouse informant James Gilliam claimed Elmore confessed to robbing Edwards and killing her because “she wouldn’t quit screaming.” Gilliam also testified that Elmore said he wiped everything down to avoid leaving fingerprints.

The prosecution asserted that 53 hairs collected from the victim's bed—where the alleged rape occurred—were primarily Elmore's pubic hairs. However, significant issues arose: forensic testimony revealed that only 49 hairs were actually collected, with seven later removed for further testing. The defense failed to challenge this discrepancy. Additionally, the evidence bag was unsealed, raising concerns about possible contamination or tampering. The police also failed to photograph the bed or collect the bedsheets as evidence.

After just two and a half hours of deliberation, the jury found Elmore guilty of murder, criminal sexual conduct, housebreaking, and burglary, recommending a death sentence.

Diana Holt, an intern at the South Carolina Death Penalty Resource Center, began investigating Elmore's claims of innocence in 1993. Describing the state's case, she stated, "All the forensic evidence evaporated under the smallest measure of scrutiny.”

=== Second trial ===
Elmore's second trial ended the same way as his first. He was convicted, and the jury recommended the death sentence.

The South Carolina Supreme Court overturned the death sentence awarded at this trial because the defense had not been permitted at the sentencing stage to introduce evidence that Elmore had been a model prisoner as demanded by Skipper v. South Carolina. After a rehearing, Elmore was sentenced to death again.

=== The Fourth Circuit Court of Appeals ===
The Fourth Circuit Court of Appeals reviewed Elmore's appeal in February 2007. It said that Elmore's case was “one of those exceptional cases of ‘extreme malfunctions in the state criminal justice systems’” and questioned his trial attorneys’ “gross failure . . . to investigate the State’s forensic evidence.” He was ordered a new trial.

=== Plea deal ===
On March 3, 2012, Elmore and his legal team agreed to an Alford plea with prosecutor Jerry Peace. Elmore was sentenced to time served and released.

== Criticism of prosecution ==
Elmore's case has been covered extensively and labeled by many as a miscarriage of justice.

=== Anatomy of Injustice: A Murder Case Gone Wrong ===
Raymond Bonner covers Elmore's legal battles in his book Anatomy of Injustice: A Murder Gone Wrong. There, he presents the case that the state of South Carolina convicted Elmore and kept him in jail despite numerous questions about the reliability of evidence, deceit by the Greenwood District Attorney's Office, and ineffective assistance of counsel by Elmore's initial trial counsel.

Bonner said that Elmore's case “stands out because it raises nearly all the issues that shape debate about capital punishment: race, mental retardation, a jailhouse informant, DNA testing, bad defense lawyers, prosecutorial misconduct and a strong claim of innocence.”

== Release and life after prison ==
Elmore was released from prison on March 3, 2012, following an Alford plea. He died six years later in 2018. "According to a relative, he woke up that morning in his Columbia home, poured himself a cup of coffee and went out to his front porch to enjoy it. As he sat there, his heart stopped beating."

He is buried at Mt. Olive Baptist Church in Abbeville, South Carolina.
