= Seneca High School (South Carolina) =

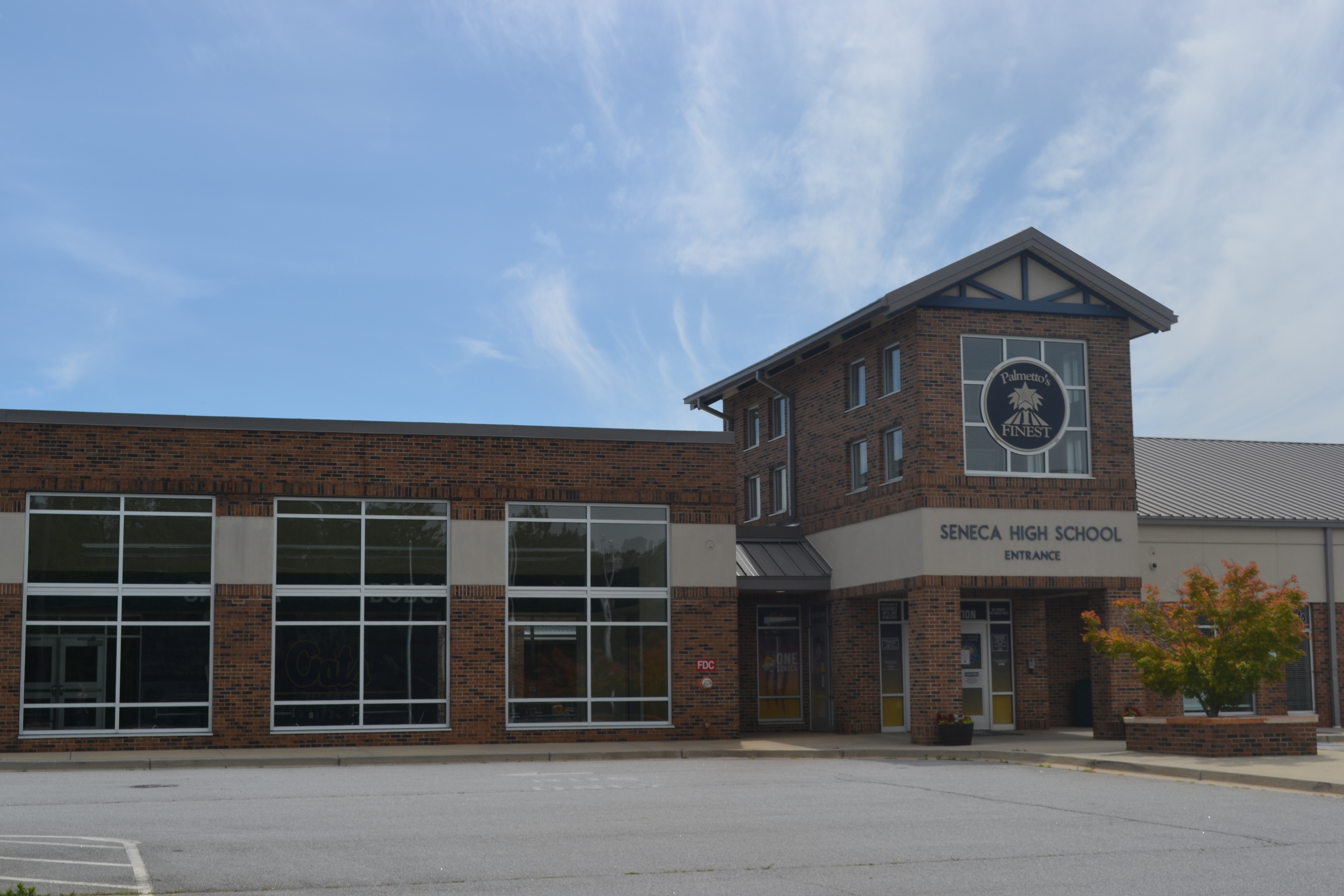
- Seneca High School

Location
- 100 Bobcat Ridge; Seneca, Oconee County, South Carolina 29678; United States
- 34°40′31″N 82°59′18″W

Information
- School type: Public
- School district: School District of Oconee County
- Principal: Ashley Ramirez
- Teaching staff: 57.80 (FTE)
- Enrollment: 1,022 (2023–2024)
- Student to teacher ratio: 17.68
- Colors: Navy and Vegas gold
- Song: Boosting The Old High School
- Athletics conference: South Carolina Region 1 AAA
- Sports: Football, basketball, baseball, track & field, golf, volleyball, cheerleading, soccer, wrestling, tennis, cross country, table tennis, hockey
- Mascot: Bobcat
- Nickname: SHS
- Yearbook: The Seneconian
- Website: shs.sdoc.org

Seneca High School is a high school in Seneca, South Carolina. It is a part of the Oconee County School District.

== Notable alumni ==
- Jimmy Orr, NFL wide receiver
- Bennie Cunningham, NFL tight end and two-time first-team All-American
- Willie Aikens, MLB first baseman
- John Wilson, USL soccer fullback
- Brad Glenn, American football coach
- Letitia H. Verdin, South Carolina Supreme Court associate justice-elect
