= Daniel E. Hydrick =

American judge (1860–1921)

Daniel Edward Hydrick
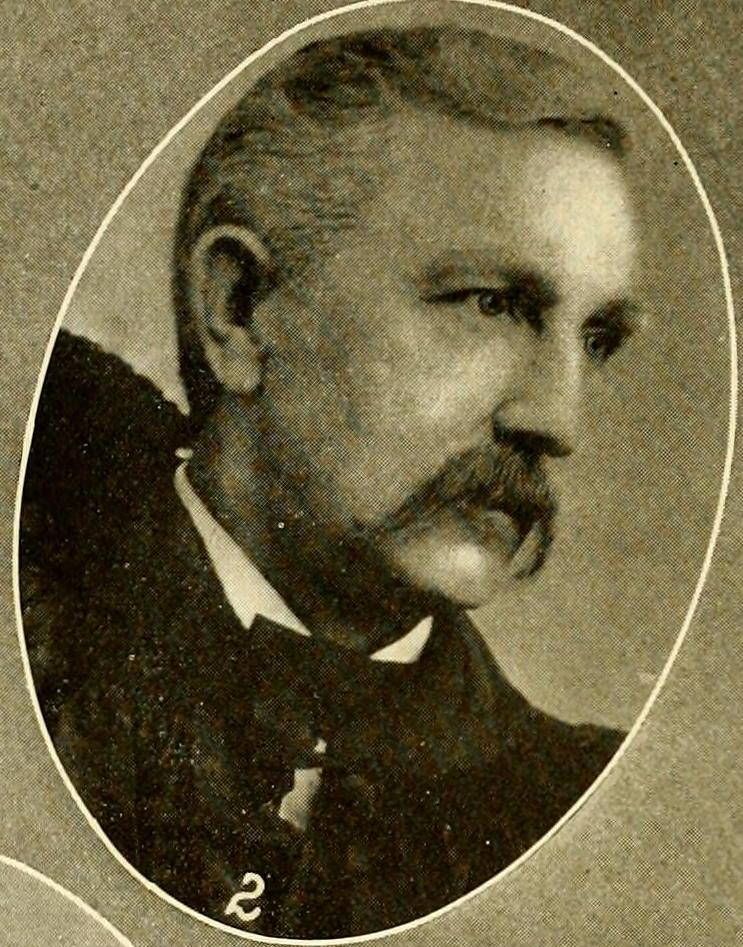

Associate Justice of South Carolina
- In office April 15, 1909 – January 15, 1921
- Preceded by: Ira B. Jones
- Succeeded by: Thomas P. Cothran

Personal details
- Born: August 6, 1860 Orangeburg, South Carolina, US
- Died: January 15, 1921 (aged 60) Washington, D.C., US
- Spouse: Rosa Lee
- Education: Vanderbilt University

Daniel Edward Hydrick Sr. (August 6, 1860 – January 15, 1921) was an American judge. he was associate justice of the South Carolina Supreme Court. He was born in Orangeburg, South Carolina on August 6, 1860, and attended Wofford College before transferring to Vanderbilt University in 1880. He began practicing law in Spartanburg, South Carolina and was twice elected to the South Carolina House of Representatives and then twice to the South Carolina Senate. He resigned during his second term in the South Carolina Senate to become a state trial court judge. His term began on December 15, 1905. He was a trial judge until 1909 when he was elected to a seat on the South Carolina Supreme Court. He was elected by the General Assembly to take the position left vacant when Ira B. Jones was elevated to the chief justice position, and he was commissioned on April 15, 1909. He was reelected to a full term in 1918. He died on January 15, 1921, in Washington, D.C.; he had been travelling from Baltimore, Maryland to Spartanburg, South Carolina to visit his son for Christmas and contracted pneumonia during the trip.
