= Jesse F. Carter =

American judge (1873–1943)

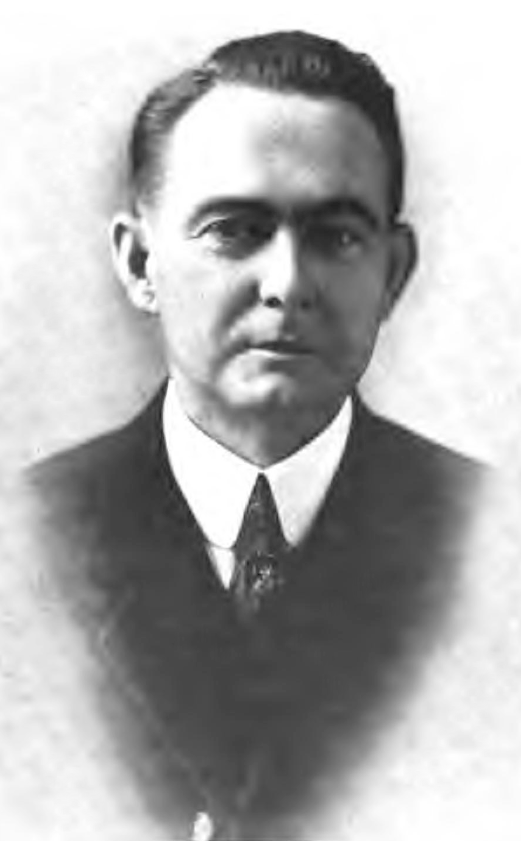

Associate Justice of South Carolina
- In office 1927 – November 5, 1943
- Preceded by: Richard C. Watts
- Succeeded by: George Dewey Oxner

Personal details
- Born: September 12, 1873 (near) Lodge, South Carolina
- Died: November 5, 1943 (aged 70)
- Spouse: Lydia Jenkins (m. 1911)
- Education: Peabody College (1900); University of Nashville (1903); University of South Carolina (LL.B. 1905)

Jesse Francis Carter (September 12, 1873 – November 5, 1943) was an associate justice of the South Carolina Supreme Court.

== Biography ==
Jesse F. Carter was born to Miles McMillan Carter and Janie Kinard Carter near Lodge, South Carolina.

After local education for grade school, he attended Peabody College in Nashville, Tennessee, graduating in 1900. He periodically worked as a teacher between periods of study. He received his law degree from the University of South Carolina in 1905. He married Lydia Jenkins on October 3, 1911, in Barnwell County. He was active in the Democratic party and served as the chairman of its executive committee for eleven years. In 1925, he was elected to the South Carolina Senate from Bamberg County. He was elected an associate justice of the South Carolina Supreme Court in 1927 and served until his death on November 5, 1943.
