= Franklin J. Moses =

Franklin J. Moses may refer to:

- Franklin J. Moses Sr. (1804–1877), Chief Justice of the South Carolina Supreme Court from 1868 to 1877
- Franklin J. Moses Jr. (1838–1906), Governor of South Carolina from 1872 to 1874, son of the above
