= Charles Albert Woods =

American judge (1852–1925)

Judge of the United States Court of Appeals for the Fourth Circuit
- In office June 5, 1913 – June 21, 1925
- Appointed by: Woodrow Wilson
- Preceded by: Nathan Goff Jr.
- Succeeded by: John J. Parker

Associate Justice of the South Carolina Supreme Court
- In office January 28, 1903 – June 7, 1913
- Preceded by: Young J. Pope
- Succeeded by: George W. Gage

Personal details
- Born: Charles Albert Woods; July 31, 1852 Darlington, South Carolina
- Died: June 21, 1925 (aged 72) Florence, South Carolina
- Education: Wofford College (AB) read law

Charles Albert Woods (July 31, 1852 – June 21, 1925) was an Associate Justice of the South Carolina Supreme Court and then a United States circuit judge of the United States Court of Appeals for the Fourth Circuit.

== Education and career ==
Born in the neighborhood of Springfield in Darlington, South Carolina, to Samuel Alexander Woods and Martha Jane DuBose Woods on July 31, 1852, Woods received an Artium Baccalaureus degree from Wofford College in 1872 and read law at the firm of Warley & Dargan to enter the bar in September 1873. He was in private practice from 1873 to 1903. On January 28, 1903, while serving as the President of the South Carolina Bar Association, he was elected a justice of the South Carolina Supreme Court by the South Carolina General Assembly by a vote of 87–67, defeating Robert Aldrich, starting a term that would last from 1903 to 1913.

== Federal judicial service ==
When Nathan Goff Jr. announced his retirement from the Fourth Circuit, Woods was an early favorite as a replacement, but members of Congress from other states within the Fourth Circuit's coverage made last minute efforts to have one of their own citizens appointed. One such effort would have created an additional seat on the Fourth Circuit (which had only two judges at the time) so that Rep. John W. Davis of West Virginia could be appointed too. That measure, however, was blocked by Senator Bristow of Kansas. On April 24, 1913, Woods was nominated by President Woodrow Wilson to a seat on the United States Court of Appeals for the Fourth Circuit vacated by Nathan Goff Jr. One South Carolina lawyer, John T. Duncan, who had been disbarred by the South Carolina Supreme Court objected to Woods' nomination; Woods had written an opinion for the South Carolina Supreme Court finding Duncan in contempt for practicing law without a license after having been disbarred, but Duncan claimed that Woods had been biased against him and lodged a complaint with the Senate Judiciary Committee. The Senate Judiciary Committee voted in favor of Woods on May 19, 1913. Woods was confirmed by the United States Senate on June 5, 1913, and received his commission the same day. Woods resigned his position on the South Carolina Supreme Court by telegraph to Governor Coleman Livingston Blease on June 7, 1913. Woods took his oath of office in Richmond, Virginia on June 7, 1913, and he served in that capacity until his death on June 21, 1925, in Florence, South Carolina.

== Sources ==
Legal offices
Preceded by Young J. Pope	Associate Justice of the South Carolina Supreme Court; 1903–1913	Succeeded by George W. Gage
Preceded by Nathan Goff Jr.	Judge of the United States Court of Appeals for the Fourth Circuit; 1913–1925	Succeeded by John J. Parker
