= Richard C. Watts =

American judge

Richard Cannon Watts
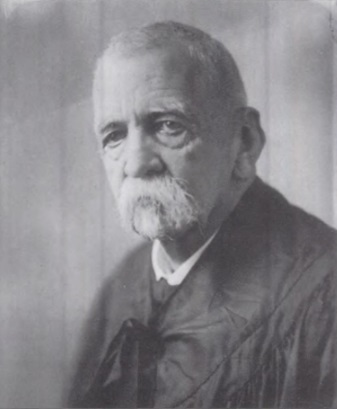

Chief Justice of South Carolina
- In office January 12, 1927 – October 13, 1930
- Preceded by: Eugene B. Gary
- Succeeded by: Eugene Satterwhite Blease

Associate Justice of South Carolina
- In office January 10, 1912 – January 12, 1927
- Preceded by: None (seat created in 1912)
- Succeeded by: Jesse F. Carter

Personal details
- Born: March 15, 1853 Laurens, South Carolina, US
- Died: October 13, 1930 (aged 77)
- Spouse(s): Aileen Cash (November 3, 1881 - January 13, 1895); Littie McIver (m. April 16, 1896)
- Education: University of Virginia

Richard Cannon Watts (March 15, 1853 – October 13, 1930) was an associate justice of the South Carolina Supreme Court. He was born on March 15, 1853. Following an amendment to the South Carolina Constitution, a fourth seat on the South Carolina Supreme Court was added, and Richard Watts was elected by the South Carolina General Assembly to the position on January 10, 1912. Justice Watts was the first person appointed to the newly created fifth seat on the state supreme court. He had previously been serving as a state trial judge. He was married to Lottie McIver, a daughter of South Carolina Supreme Court chief justice Henry McIver. Watts died on October 13, 1930.
