= David Gordon Baker =

American judge

Chief Justice of South Carolina
- In office 1943 – February 1956
- Preceded by: Milledge Lipscomb Bonham
- Succeeded by: Taylor Hudnall Stukes

Associate Justice of South Carolina
- In office March 1935 – 1943
- Preceded by: Thomas P. Cothran
- Succeeded by: Claude A. Taylor

Personal details
- Born: February 17, 1884
- Died: March 25, 1958 (aged 74) Florence, South Carolina, U.S.
- Spouse: Julia Badger
- Education: University of South Carolina (JD)

David Gordon Baker (February 17, 1884 – March 25, 1958) was an associate justice and chief justice on the South Carolina Supreme Court.

He served on the Florence City Council from 1910 to 1912 and in the South Carolina Senate from 1919 to 1922. From 1923 to 1931, he was the county attorney for Florence County, South Carolina.

Baker died on March 24, 1958.
