= James Woodrow Lewis =

American judge

Chief Justice of South Carolina
- In office August 14, 1975 – March 7, 1984
- Preceded by: Joseph Rodney Moss
- Succeeded by: C. Bruce Littlejohn

Associate Justice of South Carolina
- In office February 21, 1961 – August 14, 1975
- Preceded by: Claude A. Taylor
- Succeeded by: William Luther Rhodes

Personal details
- Born: March 8, 1912 Swift Creek, Darlington County, South Carolina, US
- Died: 1999 (aged 86–87)
- Spouse: Alice Lee

James Woodrow Lewis (1912–1999) was a chief justice on the South Carolina Supreme Court.

Lewis was born in the Swift Creek area of Darlington County, South Carolina on March 8, 1912. Although he began law school in 1931, economic conditions during the Depression forced him to return home to Swift Creek to run a country store owned by his father. He continued studying the law under the tutelage of a local lawyer, and he was admitted to practice on December 6, 1935. At the age of 22, he was elected to the Statehouse. Legislators were exempt from the draft during World War II, but he resigned in midterm to enter the military.

Lewis served for sixteen years as a trial court judge before he was elected as an associate justice of the South Carolina Supreme Court on February 21, 1961. He was elected chief justice on January 21, 1975, to fill the unexpired term of Joseph Rodney Moss; was sworn in on August 14, 1975; and served until his retirement in 1984. Chief Justice Lewis retired upon reaching the state's mandatory retirement age of 72. In 1999, Lewis died, and was buried in Swift Creek Baptist Church Cemetery.
