= Eugene Satterwhite Blease =

American judge (1877–1963)

Chief Justice of South Carolina
- In office January 14, 1931 – October 8, 1934
- Preceded by: Richard C. Watts
- Succeeded by: John G. Stabler

Associate Justice of South Carolina
- In office January 14, 1926 – January 14, 1931
- Preceded by: John Hardin Marion
- Succeeded by: Milledge Lipscomb Bonham

Personal details
- Born: January 27, 1877
- Died: December 27, 1963 (aged 86) Newberry, South Carolina
- Spouse: Urbana Neel
- Education: Newberry College

Eugene Satterwhite Blease (1877-1963) was the chief justice of the South Carolina Supreme Court from 1931 to 1934.

Blease graduated from Newberry College in Newberry, South Carolina and then worked as a teacher. He is the brother of Cole Blease, who became governor of South Carolina and later a senator. In 1899, Eugene Blease was admitted to the South Carolina bar. He practiced law in Saluda and was a member of the South Carolina House of Representatives from Saluda County in 1901 and 1902. He was Saluda County's state senator in 1905 and 1906.

In September 1905, Blease shot and killed his brother-in-law, Joe Ben Coleman, after accusing Coleman of having an affair with his wife. He was acquitted on self defense grounds on April 11, 1906.

After moving to Newberry, he was the mayor of Newberry in 1920 and 1921 and then served in the House from 1922 until 1924. In 1926 he was elected as an associate justice of the South Carolina Supreme Court and was elevated to Chief Justice in 1931. Because of his health, he issued a letter of resignation on March 28, 1934, as effective October 8, 1934. In 1942, he returned to politics but lost in a close election for the United States Senate to Burnet R. Maybank. He is buried at the Rosemont Cemetery in Newberry, South Carolina.
