= John G. Stabler =

American judge

Chief Justice of South Carolina
- In office March 15, 1935 – January 3, 1940
- Preceded by: Eugene Satterwhite Blease
- Succeeded by: Milledge Lipscomb Bonham

Associate Justice of South Carolina
- In office January 1926 – March 15, 1935
- Preceded by: Thomas B. Fraser
- Succeeded by: Edward Ladson Fishburne

Personal details
- Born: October 3, 1871
- Died: January 3, 1940 (aged 68)
- Education: Wofford College (1905); University of South Carolina (J.D., 1908)

John G. Stabler (1871-1940) was an associate justice and later chief justice on the South Carolina Supreme Court. He graduated from Wofford in 1905 and then taught Latin in Bamberg County, South Carolina. He graduated in 1908 from the law school at the University of South Carolina and practiced law in St. Matthews, South Carolina. From 1920 to 1926, he served in the South Carolina Senate until being elected to the South Carolina Supreme Court in 1926, taking his position in January 1926. On March 15, 1935, he was elevated to chief justice and served until his death in 1940.
