= Thomas Bussey =

Thomas Bussey may refer to:

- Thomas H. Bussey (1857–1937), American politician from New York
- Thomas P. Bussey (1905–1981), American judge from South Carolina
