= David W. Harwell =

American judge

Chief Justice of South Carolina
- In office January 1, 1992 – 1994
- Preceded by: George Gregory, Jr.
- Succeeded by: A. Lee Chandler

Associate Justice of South Carolina
- In office 1980 – January 1, 1992
- Preceded by: William Luther Rhodes
- Succeeded by: James E. Moore

Personal details
- Born: January 8, 1932 Mars Bluff, South Carolina
- Died: September 30, 2015 (aged 83) Florence, South Carolina
- Spouse: Deborah Boggs Harwell
- Education: University of South Carolina (J.D. 1958)

David Walker Harwell (January 8, 1932 – September 30, 2015) was an associate justice and chief justice on the South Carolina Supreme Court. He was sworn in as chief justice on December 19, 1991, with his term to commence upon the retirement of Chief Justice George Gregory, Jr. on January 1, 1992. He died on September 30, 2015.
