= Huston J. Lomax =

American politician

Huston J. Lomax (c. 1832 – November 11, 1870) was a legislator in South Carolina during the Reconstruction era. He was a delegate to the 1868 South Carolina Constitutional Convention, where he represented Abbeville County. He was elected to represent Abbeville County in the South Carolina Senate in 1870 but died before it convened. James Sproull Cothran was elected to replace him, but the election was protested and he was prevented from taking office.

Described as a mulatto, Lomax was born a slave in South Carolina in 1832. In addition to his political career, he worked as a carpenter, merchant, and farmer. He died in 1870 and is buried in the Colored People's Cemetery of Abbeville, South Carolina.
