= James Brailsford =

James Brailsford may refer to:

- James Frederick Brailsford (1888–1961), British radiologist
- James M. Brailsford Jr. (1910–1993), American judge
