= Rainbow Row =

Series of thirteen colorful historic houses in Charleston, South Carolina

Coordinates: 32°46′32″N 79°55′38″W

Rainbow Row is the name for a series of thirteen colorful historic houses in Charleston, South Carolina. The houses are located north of Tradd St. and south of Elliott St. on East Bay Street, that is, 79 to 107 East Bay Street. The name Rainbow Row was coined after the pastel colors they were painted as they were restored in the 1930s and 1940s. It is a popular tourist attraction and is one of the most photographed parts of Charleston.

== History ==
Rainbow Row originally fronted directly on the riverfront of the Cooper River, but that land was subsequently filled in. Merchants constructed commercial buildings with stores on the first (ground) floor and living quarters above. Most of the buildings had no interior access between the first and second floors; exterior stairs were located in the yards behind the houses. In 1778, a fire destroyed much of the neighborhood, and only 95 to 101 East Bay Street were spared.

After the Civil War, this area of Charleston devolved into near slum conditions. In the 1920s, Susan Pringle Frost, the founder of the Society for the Preservation of Old Dwellings, now the Preservation Society of Charleston, bought six of the buildings, but she lacked the money to restore them immediately. In 1931, Dorothy Haskell Porcher Legge purchased a section of these, house numbering 99 through 101 East Bay, and began to renovate them. She chose to paint these houses pink based on a colonial Caribbean color scheme. Other owners and future owners followed suit, creating the "rainbow" of pastel colors present today. The coloring of the houses helped keep the houses cool inside as well as give the area its name. By 1945, most of the houses had been restored.

Common myths concerning Charleston include variants on the reasons for the paint colors. According to some tales, the houses were painted in the various colors such that the intoxicated sailors coming in from port could remember which houses they were to bunk in. In other versions, the colors of the buildings date from their use as stores; the colors were used so that owners could tell illiterate slaves which building to go to for shopping.

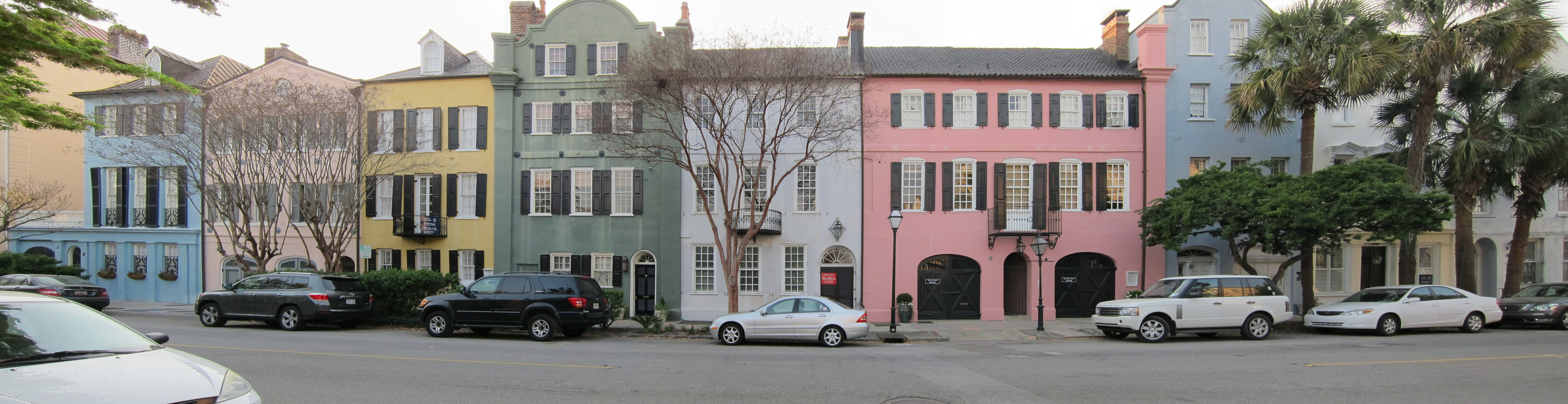
Panoramic image of Rainbow Row

== Houses ==
Rainbow Row is composed of thirteen different buildings, most of which share party walls with their neighboring houses. The following are summaries of the buildings.

=== 79-81 East Bay Street ===
The two-part structure at the northwest corner of Tradd St. and East Bay St. anchors the southern end of Rainbow Row. The southernmost building dates from about 1845 (making it the newest building in Rainbow Row), while the adjoining building at 81 East Bay St. was built after a 1778 fire and before 1785.

=== 83 East Bay Street ===
The William Stone House was built in about 1784 by a Tory merchant who left Charleston for England during the Revolutionary War. An earlier building was destroyed in a fire in 1778, but it had been replaced by the time the tract was sold in 1784. Susan Pringle Frost bought 83 East Bay Street and restored it as a dwelling in 1941, adding a neoclassical balcony to the front and replacing a storefront with a Colonial Revival style door.

=== 85 East Bay Street ===
The house at 85 East Bay Street was probably built near the time of the American Revolution. Like others on Rainbow Row, it had a commercial use on the ground floor (viz., a ship chandlery) and living space above. The interior living space displays Chinese Chippendale details. In 1944, the house was purchased by Mrs. Louise Graves and restored. It was the last house along Rainbow Row to be restored following many years of vacancy.

=== 87 East Bay Street ===
In 1778, a former building was destroyed in a fire and was replaced by Scottish merchant James Gordon after he bought the land in 1792. The four-story building was purchased by Susan Pringle Frost in 1920, and she subsequently did some of the restoration work. She added a balcony to the front of the house before reselling it in 1955. The house still has its original windows and stucco.

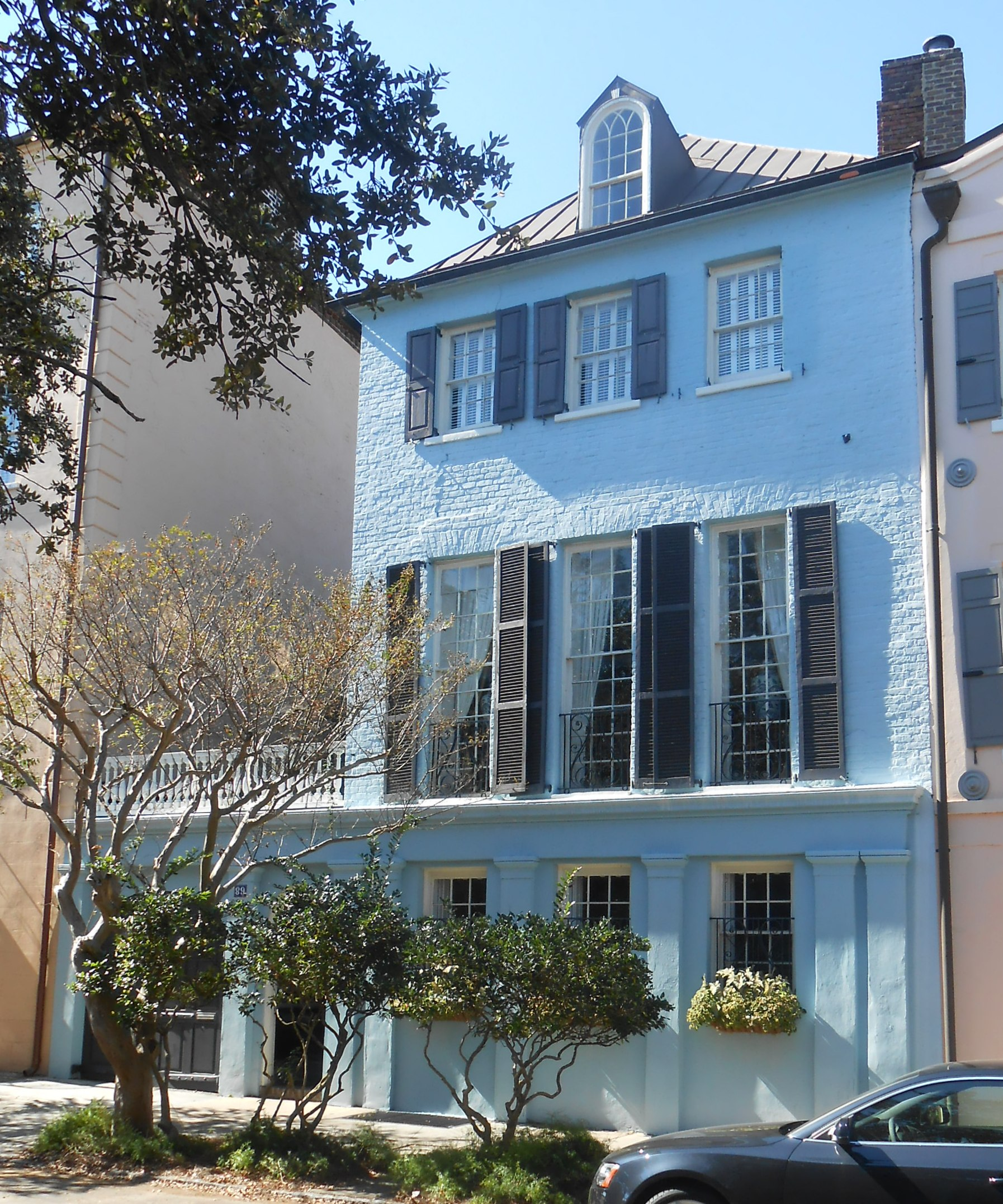
89 East Bay St. was built in about 1770.

=== 89 East Bay Street ===
Like its neighbors, 89 East Bay Street, also known as the Deas-Tunno House, was built for commercial uses with residential space above. It was constructed in about 1770 and is unlike most houses along Rainbow Row in that it includes a side yard separating it from the adjacent house to the south. The garden is screened by a wall with a balustrade. A garage fronts the sidewalk.

=== 91 East Bay Street ===
Merchants Peter Leger and William Greenwood bought a building at 91 East Bay Street in 1774, but it was destroyed in a fire in 1778. In 1793, the building was sold to Nathaniel Russell, a Rhode Island merchant. After a series of owners and uses, Susan Pringle Frost bought the house in 1920; she sold it to New York playwright John McGowan in 1941. McGowan removed Greek Revival details which had been added to the house in the 19th century and had the current details created including the large arched doors on the first floor and roofline. In the panoramic photo above, 91 East Bay St. is the second house from the left. In the photo above, the house is at the extreme right edge.

=== 93 East Bay Street ===
The James Cook House was built in about 1778 and had a commercial use on the first floor with a residence above. Following its restoration, there is a kitchen and dining room on the first floor and a drawing room and library on the second floor. In the panoramic photo above, 93 East Bay St. is the bright yellow house, third from the left.

=== 95 East Bay Street ===
Because of gaps in the chain of title, a builder for 95 East Bay Street has been impossible to pinpoint. However, it has stylistic clues which suggest a connection to the neighboring houses at 97 and 99-101 East Bay Street and a possible connection to the builder of those buildings, Othniel Beale. In 1779, 95 East Bay Street was owned by Charles Cotesworth Pinckney. In 1789, a commercial interest bought the property, but the storefront window was later replaced with the existing pair of entrances and small windows. The house was restored by New York playwright John McGowan in 1938. In the panoramic photo above, 95 East Bay St. is the green, four story house with Flemish gable roofline.

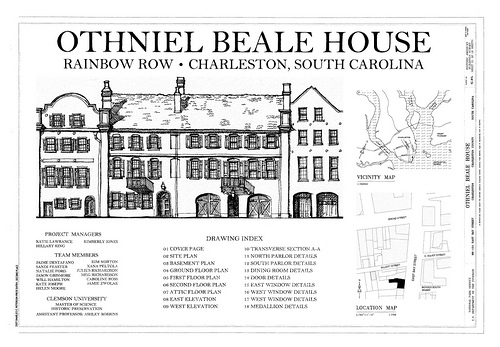
Drawing, Othniel Beale House and Rainbow Row, Historic American Buildings Survey

=== 97 and 99-101 East Bay Street ===
Othniel Beale bought the lot upon which 97 East Bay St. is built in March 1741 for a price not indicating the presence of a building. When he added a small piece of land to his lot in 1748, the deed referred to his "new Brick Store" as one of the landmarks. Beale also built the adjoining 99-101 East Bay St., a building which shares a roof, party wall, and decorative elements. After the death of Beale, both properties passed through several owners and uses. Susan Pringle Frost bought 97 East Bay Street and resold it in 1936. Judge Lionel K. Legge and Mrs. Dorothy Legge undertook a restoration of 99-101 East Bay Street starting in July 1931. Their house was the first on Rainbow Row to be restored. Mrs. Dorothy Haskell Porcher Legge was recognized for her groundbreaking restoration work on the house with an award from the Preservation Society of Charleston in 1992. In the panoramic photo above, 99-101 East Bay St. is the widest house shown, and 97 East Bay is the blue house with three windows and a door on the ground floor to its left.

=== 103 East Bay Street ===
The Joseph Dulles House was built about 1787. The builder was an ancestor of John Foster Dulles. The house was restored in the 1930s by Anna Wells Rutledge with the assistance of architects Simons and Lapham.

=== 105 East Bay Street ===
The Dutarque-Guida House was built after the tract was acquired by Lewis Dutarque in 1778. The sales price in 1784 suggests that the house had been built in that small window. The building was bought by Italian immigrant Giovanni Domenico Guida who installed an iron, Victorian storefront on the building with his name displayed. Anna Wells Rutledge purchased the building in 1970 and retained the storefront. It is the only building on Rainbow Row to retain its Victorian storefront.

=== 107 East Bay Street ===
John Blake bought the lot at the southwest corner of Elliott St. and East Bay St. in 1791 and immediately executed an agreement with the owner of the neighboring property to the south at 105 East Bay St. The neighboring house had been built eight inches across the property line onto Blake's new lot. In exchange for receiving a deed to the misplaced wall, Blake agreed to build a gutter to drain water from between the existing building and the one which he planned to construct. Thus, 107 East Bay Street seems to date to about 1792. During more than 200 years, the house has seen many alterations to its appearance and interior. Indeed, when the house was bought by Irving Solomon in the 1970s, the new owner was unable to determine the original configuration for restoration. A two-story kitchen house stands behind 107 East Bay St. and can be seen from Elliott St.; it is now a separate house titled 1 Elliott St.
