= Thomas B. Fraser =

American judge

Associate Justice of South Carolina
- In office January 12, 1912 – May 21, 1925
- Preceded by: Eugene B. Gary
- Succeeded by: John G. Stabler

Personal details
- Born: June 21, 1860
- Died: May 21, 1925 (aged 64)
- Spouse: Emma Edmunds

Thomas Boone Fraser (June 21, 1860 – May 21, 1925) was an associate justice of the South Carolina Supreme Court. He was elected on January 11, 1912. He was sworn in on January 12, 1912. He died on May 21, 1925.
