= Justice Moss =

Justice Moss may refer to:

- Joseph Rodney Moss (1903–1993), associate justice and Chief Justice on the South Carolina Supreme Court
- William W. Moss (1872–1949), associate justice of the Rhode Island Supreme Court

== See also ==
- Judge Moss (disambiguation)
