= George Dewey Oxner =

American judge

Associate Justice of South Carolina
- In office 1944–1962
- Preceded by: Jesse F. Carter
- Succeeded by: James M. Brailsford, Jr.

Personal details
- Born: 1898
- Died: 1962 (aged 63–64)
- Spouse: Frances Ruckman

George Dewey Oxner was an associate justice of the South Carolina Supreme Court.

Oxner was a native of Kinards, South Carolina. He attended Newberry College, where he received an A.B. degree, and the University of South Carolina School of Law (LL.B., 1920).

He practiced law in Greenville before being elected to two terms in the South Carolina House of Representatives. He was elected, in 1932, as a trial court judge. In 1944, he was elevated to the South Carolina Supreme Court and served until his death in 1962.
