= Stukes =

Stukes is a surname. Notable people with the surname include:

- Charlie Stukes (born 1943), American football defensive back
- Dwayne Stukes (born 1977), American football coach and former defensive back
- Melvin L. Stukes (born 1948), American politician
- Taylor Hudnall Stukes, American judge
- Treydan Stukes (born 2001), American football player
