= Donald W. Beatty =

American judge (born 1952)

Don Beatty
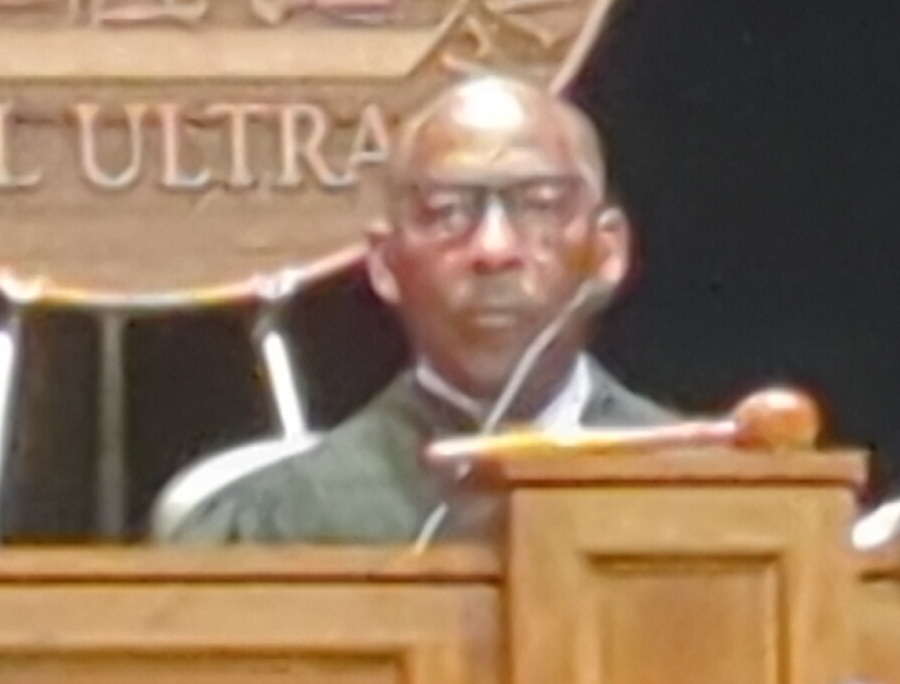

Chief Justice of the South Carolina Supreme Court
- In office January 1, 2017 – July 31, 2024
- Preceded by: Costa M. Pleicones
- Succeeded by: John W. Kittredge

Associate Justice of the South Carolina Supreme Court
- In office May 23, 2007 – December 21, 2016
- Preceded by: E. C. Burnett III
- Succeeded by: George C. James

Member of the South Carolina House of Representatives from the 31st district
- In office January 1991 – January 1995
- Preceded by: Tee Ferguson
- Succeeded by: Brenda Lee

Personal details
- Born: Donald Wayne Beatty; April 29, 1952 (age 74) Spartanburg, South Carolina, U.S.
- Party: Democratic
- Education: South Carolina State University (BA); University of South Carolina, Columbia (JD)

Donald Wayne Beatty (born April 29, 1952) is a former chief justice of the South Carolina Supreme Court and a former South Carolina state court judge and state representative.

== Early life and personal life ==
Beatty was born in Spartanburg, South Carolina on April 29, 1952 to Arthur and Ruth Beatty. He graduated from South Carolina State University with a Bachelor of Arts degree in 1974, and University of South Carolina with a Juris Doctor degree in 1979. Beatty married Angela D. Chestnut on February 23, 1985. They have three children.

== Political career ==
Beatty served as a member of the Spartanburg city council from 1988 to 1990, and served two terms in the South Carolina House of Representatives from 1991 to 1994 representing the 31st district.

== Judicial career ==
=== South Carolina Supreme Court ===
Beatty was elected to a seat on the South Carolina Supreme Court on May 23, 2007, to replace Justice E. C. Burnett, III. He became the court's Chief Justice on January 1, 2017 after being elected to fill the vacancy caused by the mandatory retirement of Chief Justice Costa M. Pleicones.

=== Expired nomination to federal district court under Obama ===
On February 25, 2016, President Barack Obama nominated Beatty to serve as a United States District Judge of the United States District Court for the District of South Carolina, to the seat vacated by Judge Cameron McGowan Currie, who assumed senior status on October 3, 2013. On June 21, 2016, a hearing before the Senate Judiciary Committee was held on his nomination. On July 14, 2016, his nomination was reported out of committee by a voice vote. His nomination expired on January 3, 2017, with the end of the 114th Congress.

=== Retirement ===
In 2024, Beatty turned 72 years old, which is the mandatory retirement age for judges in South Carolina. As a result, he retired on July 31, 2024, and was replaced as Chief Justice by Judge John W. Kittredge. On June 5, 2024, the South Carolina General Assembly elected Letitia Verdin to replace Kittredge; she was the only candidate still running for Kittredge's seat after two others had dropped out. Beatty's replacement by Verdin changes the South Carolina Supreme Court from having only male judges to having only white judges.

Legal offices
Preceded by E. C. Burnett III	Associate Justice of the South Carolina Supreme Court; 2007–2016	Succeeded by George C. James
Preceded by Costa M. Pleicones	Chief Justice of the South Carolina Supreme Court; 2017–2024	Succeeded by John W. Kittredge
