= John Marion =

John Marion may refer to:

- John L. Marion (1933–2026), American auctioneer and philanthropist
- John Hardin Marion (1874–1944), associate justice of the South Carolina Supreme Court
- John Marion (runner) (born 1911), 800 m runner-up at the 1938 USA Outdoor Track and Field Championships
