= Senator Moses =

Senator Moses may refer to:

- Franklin J. Moses Sr. (1804–1877), South Carolina State Senate
- George H. Moses (1869–1944), U.S. Senator from New Hampshire from 1918 to 1933
- John Moses (North Dakota politician) (1885–1945), U.S. Senator from North Dakota in 1945
