= Lionel K. Legge =

American judge

Lionel Kennedy Legge

Associate Justice of South Carolina
- In office 1954 – December 1961
- Preceded by: Edward Ladson Fishburne
- Succeeded by: Thomas P. Bussey

Personal details
- Born: December 11, 1889
- Died: July 22, 1970 (aged 80) Charleston, South Carolina, US
- Spouse: Dorothy Haskell Porcher
- Education: College of Charleston; Columbia University (J.D.)

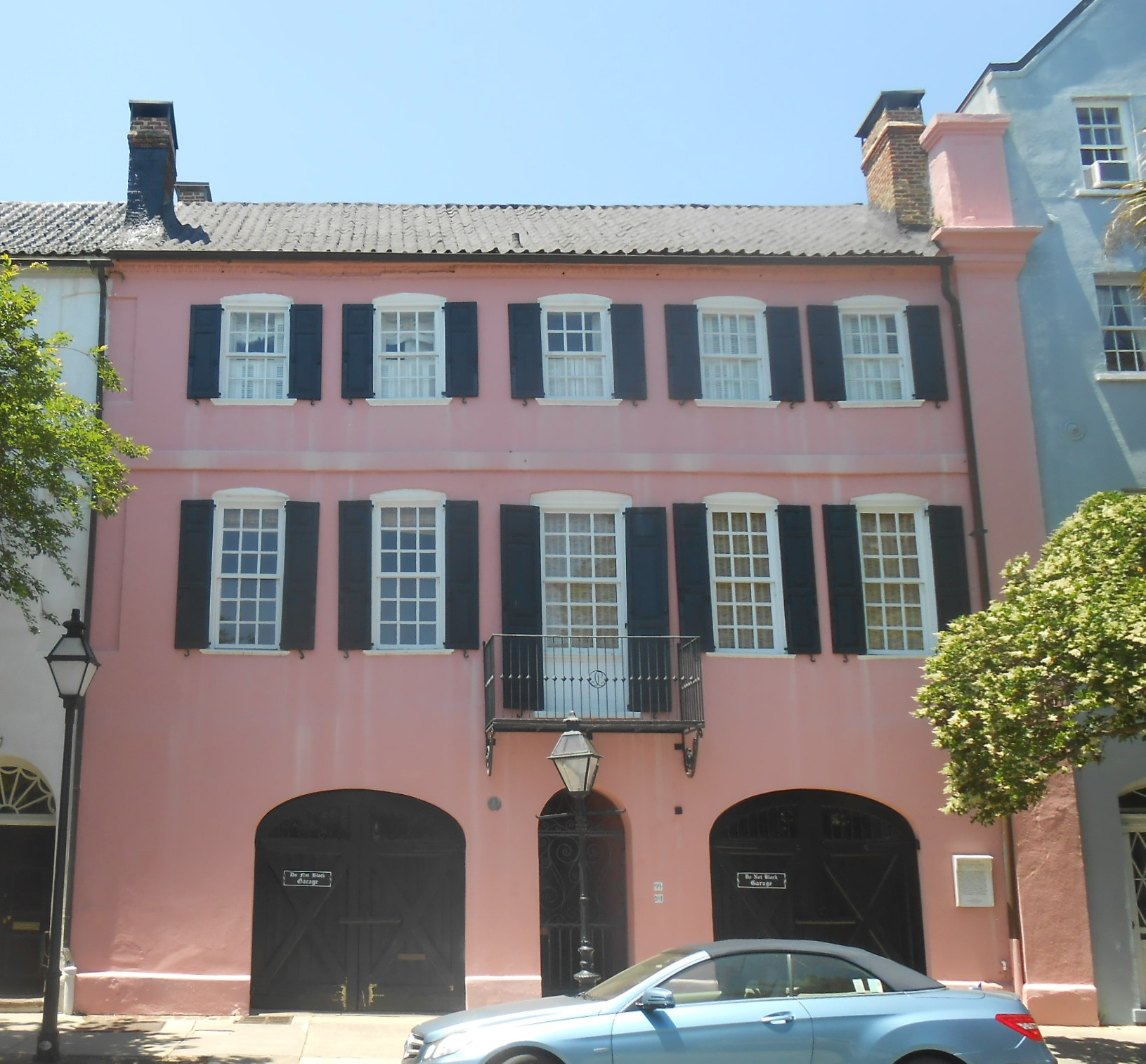
Justice Legge and his wife restored and then occupied 99-101 East Bay Street on Charleston's Rainbow Row.

Lionel K. Legge (1889-1970) was an associate justice of the South Carolina Supreme Court. He was the president of the Charleston County Bar starting in 1940. Justice Legge and his wife, Dorothy Haskell Porcher Legge, undertook the first restoration of Charleston's historic Rainbow Row homes in 1931 and made 99-101 East Bay Street their home.
