= Milledge Lipscomb Bonham =

American judge (1854–1943)

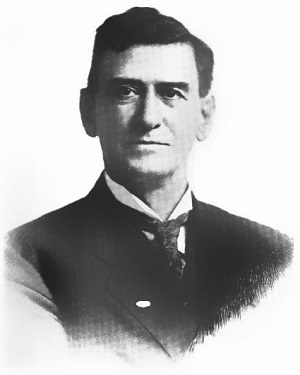

Chief Justice of South Carolina
- In office January 10, 1940 – June 23, 1943
- Preceded by: John G. Stabler
- Succeeded by: David Gordon Baker

Associate Justice of South Carolina
- In office February 17, 1931 – January 10, 1940
- Preceded by: Eugene Satterwhite Blease
- Succeeded by: Taylor Hudnall Stukes

Personal details
- Born: October 16, 1854 Edgefield, South Carolina, US
- Died: June 23, 1943 (aged 88) Anderson, South Carolina, US
- Spouse(s): Daisy Aldrich, Dr. Lillian L. Carter (1925–1945)

Milledge Lipscomb Bonham (1854–1943) was a chief justice on the South Carolina Supreme Court. On October 16, 1854, he was born to Milledge Luke Bonham and Ann Patience Griffin. From 1863 to 1864, Bonham was educated at Sachlaben's Academy, Edgefield Academy between 1866 and 1872, and Carolina Military Institute (Charlotte) from 1875 to 1876. He was admitted to the South Carolina bar in 1877 following his tutoring of the law under Colonel Robert Aldrich. He married Daisy Aldrich on October 24, 1878, with whom he had three children. After Daisy died, Bonham remarried to Dr. Lillian L. Carter on March 2, 1925.

Bonham commenced his career editing newspapers. He aided in the establishment of the Ninety Six Guardian and subsequently relocated to Newberry, South Carolina, where he became the Newberry News' editor. Only afterwards did he relocate to Abbeville, South Carolina, where he began practicing law.

Bonham was appointed adjutant and inspector general of South Carolina by Governor John Calhoun Sheppard in August 1886 after the death of Arthur Middleton Manigault. He was elected to the post in November 1886 and reelected in 1888, serving until 1889. In 1894, Bonham moved to Anderson, South Carolina and practiced law in association with Henry Hitt Watkins.

On February 1, 1924, Bonham was made a state trial court judge; an associate justice of the South Carolina Supreme Court on February 17, 1931; and chief justice of the South Carolina Supreme Court on January 10, 1940.

He was a hereditary member of the Aztec Club of 1847.

Chief Justice Bonham died on June 23, 1943, in Anderson, South Carolina.
