= A. Lee Chandler =

American judge

Archie Lee Chandler

Chief Justice of South Carolina
- In office June 22, 1994 – December 16, 1994
- Preceded by: David W. Harwell
- Succeeded by: Ernest A. Finney, Jr.

Associate Justice of South Carolina
- In office 1984 – June 22, 1994
- Preceded by: C. Bruce Littlejohn
- Succeeded by: John H. Waller

Personal details
- Born: December 16, 1922 Orangeburg, South Carolina, US
- Died: July 18, 2012 (aged 89) Mt. Pleasant, South Carolina, US
- Spouse: Martha Nell Wilkins
- Education: The Citadel, George Washington University (A.B.), University of South Carolina School of Law

Archie Lee Chandler (December 16, 1922 – July 18, 2012) was an associate justice of the South Carolina Supreme Court. He attended The Citadel, but had to miss his senior year to join the military during World War II. He settled in Darlington, South Carolina to practice law, and was elected from there to the South Carolina House of Representatives in 1972. In 1976, he was made a trial court judge, a position he held until being elevated to the South Carolina Supreme Court.

He was elected to the South Carolina Supreme Court in 1984 and became the chief justice in 1994. His election to be the new chief justice took place on February 23, 1994. He was sworn in on June 22, 1994.
