= Taylor Hudnall Stukes =

American judge

Chief Justice of South Carolina
- In office 1956 – February 20, 1961
- Preceded by: David Gordon Baker
- Succeeded by: Claude A. Taylor

Associate Justice of South Carolina
- In office 1940–1956
- Preceded by: Milledge Lipscomb Bonham
- Succeeded by: Joseph Rodney Moss

Personal details
- Born: June 1, 1893 Manning, South Carolina
- Died: February 20, 1961 (aged 67) Charleston, South Carolina
- Spouse: Georgie Sauls Manning
- Education: Davidson College, Washington and Lee (1915), George Washington University (LL.B., 1919)

Taylor Hudnall Stukes was an associate justice and chief justice on the South Carolina Supreme Court.

== Life ==
He was born in Manning, South Carolina attended Davidson College; Washington and Lee University (LL.B., cum laude, 1919); and Erskine College (LL.D., 1969). He served as a lieutenant in World War I and practiced law in Manning, South Carolina. He served in the state House of Representatives from 1923 to 1926 and in the state Senate from 1927 to 1940. He was elected associate justice of the South Carolina Supreme Court on February 29, 1940, and chief justice in 1956 upon the resignation of Chief Justice D. Gordon Baker. He died on February 20, 1961, as a result of complications from heart surgery.
