= Thomas P. Bussey =

American judge

Thomas Patrick Bussey

Associate Justice of South Carolina
- In office December 11, 1961 – September 30, 1975
- Preceded by: Lionel K. Legge
- Succeeded by: George Gregory, Jr.

Personal details
- Born: May 7, 1905 Parksville, South Carolina, US
- Died: July 26, 1981 (aged 76) Charleston, South Carolina, US
- Spouse: Louise McKelvey Florence
- Education: The Citadel; University of South Carolina (J.D.)

Thomas Patrick Bussey (1905-1981) was an associate justice of the South Carolina Supreme Court.

== Biography ==
Justice Bussey was twice a representative in the South Carolina House of Representatives (from 1937 to 1940 and then again in 1957 to 1958). He was elected a trial court judge in January 1958 and then reelected in 1961 for a full term. He was elevated to the South Carolina Supreme Court in February 1961 to fill the position, which was vacated by the retirement of Lionel K. Legge in December 1961. He was sworn in on December 11, 1961. He served on the Supreme Court until he retired on September 30, 1975.

Justice Bussey died on July 26, 1981.
