= Upper Long Cane Cemetery =

United States historic place in South Carolina

- U.S. National Register of Historic Places
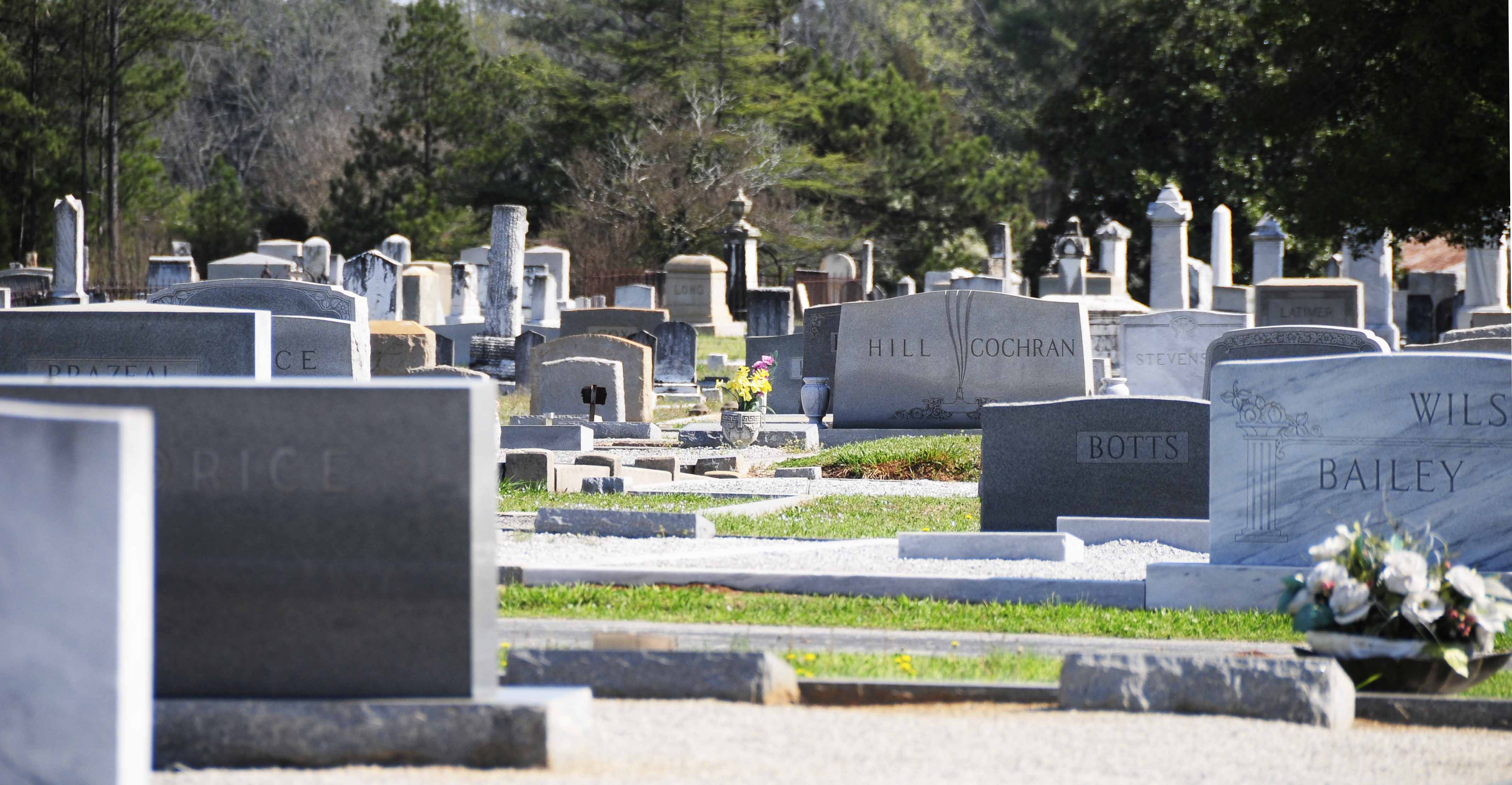

- Location within South Carolina
- Location: Greenville St (SC HWY 20 N) at junction with Beltline Rd (SC Sec Rd 1-35), Abbeville vicinity
- Coordinates: 34°12′13″N 82°23′24″W
- NRHP reference No.: 10001039
- Added to NRHP: January 17, 2010

Upper Long Cane Cemetery is a historic cemetery north of Abbeville, South Carolina, founded c. 1760. Over 2,500 marked graves and numerous unmarked graves cover the cemetery's approximately 25 acres. It was listed on the National Register of Historic Places in 2010.

The cemetery helps document the history of many prominent families in the area, from its founding into the 20th century. Many gravestones were carved by three generations of master craftsmen from Charleston, including over fifty signed or attributable to stonecutters Rowe and White, John White, William T. White, Robert D. White, and Edwin R. White.

The markers include marble, granite, sandstone, and slate headstones, as well as footstones, obelisks, pedestal-tombs, box tombs, table-top tombs, and tablets. Art on the markers and tombs includes simple engraving and ledgers with motifs of angels, doves, lambs, open Bibles, weeping willows, palmettos, flowers, wreaths, and ivy.

== Notable burials ==
- Maj. John Bowie (1740–1827), soldier in the American Revolution
- James Sproull Cothran (1830–1897), U.S. congressman
- Pvt. Ezekiel Evans (1737–1806), soldier in the American Revolution
- Pvt. James Evans (1761–1822), soldier in the American Revolution
- Lt. Gov. Eugene Blackburn Gary (1854–1926)
- Frank B. Gary (1860–1922), U.S. Senator
- Maj. Andrew Hamilton (1738–1835), officer in the American Revolution
- Samuel McGowan (1819–1897), Confederate general
