= Joseph Rodney Moss =

American judge

Chief Justice of South Carolina
- In office March 24, 1966 – June 15, 1975
- Preceded by: Claude A. Taylor
- Succeeded by: James Woodrow Lewis

Associate Justice of South Carolina
- In office 1956 – March 24, 1966
- Preceded by: Taylor Hudnall Stukes
- Succeeded by: C. Bruce Littlejohn

Personal details
- Born: July 15, 1903 York County, South Carolina
- Died: April 20, 1993 (aged 89)
- Spouse: Rosa Dill
- Education: Erskine College, University of South Carolina (J.D. 1927)

Joseph Rodney Moss (July 15, 1903 – April 20, 1993) was an associate justice and chief justice on the South Carolina Supreme Court.

In 1941, he was elected to the South Carolina Senate. In 1948, he became a trial court judge. He was chosen as an associate justice of the South Carolina Supreme Court in 1956. He was chosen as chief justice of the court in 1966. He remained chief justice until he retired in 1975. During that time, he supervised the relocation of the Supreme Court from the South Carolina State House to its current location on Gervais Street. The South Carolina unified court system was created while he served on the high court.

After retiring, he served as a special trial court judge. In 1985, he created controversy by saying "damn niggers" from the bench into a microphone that he may have thought was turned off. He had been referring to a group of black protestors who were displeased about the conviction of a black man for the killing of a white man in Pendleton, South Carolina. The York County Justice Center was named in his honor over the objections of the NAACP.

== Personal life ==
He married Rosa Dill in 1931, they had no children and she died in 1966.
