= Thomas P. Cothran =

American politician and judge (1857–1934)

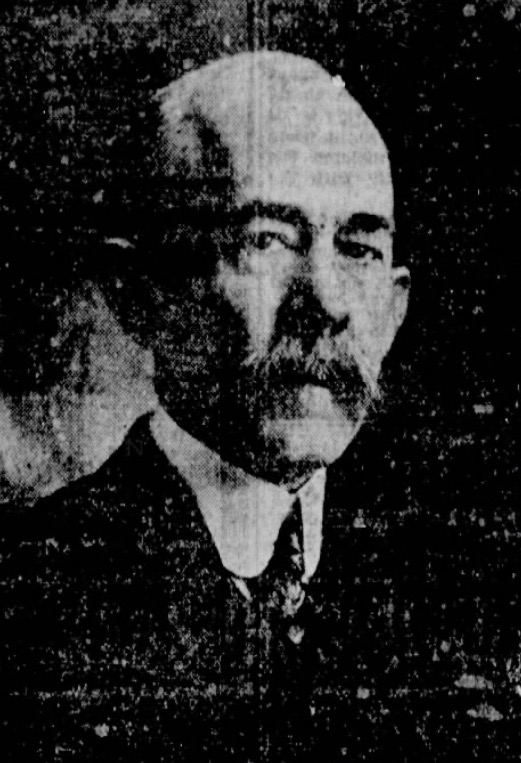

Associate justice of the South Carolina Supreme Court
- In office January 28, 1921 – April 11, 1934
- Preceded by: Daniel E. Hydrick
- Succeeded by: David Gordon Baker

44th Speaker of the South Carolina House of Representatives
- In office 1918 – January 28, 1921
- Preceded by: James Hoyt
- Succeeded by: J. B. Atkinson

Member of the South Carolina House of Representatives from the Greenville County district
- In office 1904–1910
- In office 1914 – January 28, 1921

Personal details
- Born: Thomas Perrin Cothran; October 24, 1857 Abbeville, South Carolina, US
- Died: April 11, 1934 (aged 76) Abbeville, South Carolina, US
- Relations: Thomas C. Perrin (grandfather)
- Parent: James S. Cothran (father)
- Education: University of Virginia; Harvard Law School
- Occupation: Politician, judge

Thomas Perrin Cothran (October 24, 1857 – April 11, 1934) was an American politician and judge. A Democrat, he served as Speaker of the South Carolina House of Representatives, and was later an associate justice of the South Carolina Supreme Court.

== Early life and education ==
Cothran was born on October 27, 1857, in Abbeville, South Carolina, the eldest son of politician James S. Cothran and Emma Chiles (née Perrin) Cothran. His maternal grandfather was Thomas C. Perrin, who served in the South Carolina General Assembly.

Cothran was first educated at local private schools. He studied at the University of Virginia from 1876 to 1878, as well as at Harvard Law School. He was admitted to the bar in 1878, after which he practiced law.

== Career ==
For a time, Cothran was a lawyer for the Southern Railway, as which he was paid little, relative to the company's wealth. In 1891, he moved to Greenville, where he lived with his brother.

Cochran was a Democrat. He was a member of the South Carolina House of Representatives from 1904 to 1910, and again from 1914 until his resignation on January 28, 1921. While in the House, he coauthored a bill to end the South Carolina Dispensary. From 1918 to 1921, he was Speaker of the House.

In 1929, Cothran was chairman of the South Carolina Democratic Party. Following the death of Daniel E. Hydrick, he ran in the South Carolina Supreme Court election, receiving 106 votes and winning. He was an associate justice Court, serving from January 28, 1921, until his death. Politically, he was an individualist.

== Personal life and death ==
On January 6, 1886, Cothran married Ione Smith. He was Presbyterian, as well as a member of the Freemasons, the Independent Order of Odd Fellows, the Junior Order of United American Mechanics, and Kiwanis. He enjoyed playing auction bridge. He died on April 11, 1934, aged 76, in Abbeville. It is unknown where he was buried.
