= Brenda Lee (politician) =

American politician

Member of the South Carolina House of Representatives from the 31st district
- In office 1995–2005
- Preceded by: Donald W. Beatty
- Succeeded by: Harold Mitchell, Jr.

Personal details
- Born: Brenda Lee Spartanburg, South Carolina, U.S.
- Party: Democratic

Brenda Lee is an American politician. She was a member of the South Carolina House of Representatives from the 31st District, serving from 1995 to 2005. She is a member of the Democratic party.

== Early life ==
Lee grew up in Spartanburg, South Carolina, in a historically Black South side neighborhood, graduating from Carver High School in 1966.

== Political career ==
Lee was a page for Horry County South Carolina State Senator Jim Stevens in the 1990s, and later a campaign manager for Jim Clyburn's run for Congress. She was elected to the State Legislature in 1995, the first Black woman from Spartanburg County to serve. Lee was a legislator for a decade before leaving to take a position with state government.

She served with numerous organizations, including the Urban League of the Upstate, the President's Advisory Committee of Wofford College, and the Spartanburg Development Council.

In 2019, Lee invited Presidential candidate Kamala Harris to South Carolina, and endorsed her.

== Honors ==
In 2023, Lee received an honorary degree from Wofford College.

== Publications ==
Lee, along with co-authors Jim Neighbors, and Betsy Wakefield Teter, wrote the book North of Main: Spartanburg's Historic Black Neighborhoods of North Dean Street, Gas Bottom, and Back of the College, released in 2024. It includes cover remarks by historian Timothy Tyson.

== Personal life ==
Lee is married to Caveril Pryce.
