= George W. Gage (judge) =

American judge

George Williams Gage

Associate Justice of South Carolina
- In office 1914 – February 13, 1921
- Preceded by: Charles Albert Woods
- Succeeded by: John Hardin Marion

Personal details
- Born: February 4, 1856
- Died: February 13, 1921 (aged 65) Chester, South Carolina, US
- Spouse: Janie Hemphill Gaston
- Education: Wofford College (A.B.), Vanderbilt University, Tennessee Institution (L.L.B.)

George Williams Gage (February 4, 1856 – February 13, 1921) was an associate justice of the South Carolina Supreme Court. He was elected on January 15, 1914, to fill the position vacated by Judge Charles Albert Woods upon his becoming a federal judge on the Fourth Circuit Court of Appeals.

Gage served in the South Carolina Statehouse until he was elected a trial court judge in 1898. He served as a trial judge for the Sixth Circuit until being elevated to the South Carolina Supreme Court. Judge Gage wrote one of the earliest decisions recognizing the "exclusionary rule" in Town of Blacksburg v. Beam, 104 S.C. 145, 88 S.E. 441 (1916). In that opinion he said, "It is better that the guilty shall escape, rather than another offense be committed in the proof of guilt."

Gage was born on February 4, 1856, and he died on February 13, 1921.
