= E. C. Burnett III =

American judge

Associate Justice of South Carolina
- In office April 10, 1995 – September 1, 2007
- Preceded by: Ernest A. Finney Jr.
- Succeeded by: Donald W. Beatty

Personal details
- Born: January 26, 1942 (age 84) Spartanburg County, South Carolina
- Spouse: Jami Grant
- Education: Wofford College (B.A. 1964), University of South Carolina (J.D. 1969)

E. C. Burnett III (born January 26, 1942) is a former associate justice of the South Carolina Supreme Court. He was elected on March 21, 1995, to fill the unexpired nine years of Judge Randall Bell's term; Judge Bell had died before being sworn into his seat on the South Carolina Supreme Court. Burnett defeated Judge Costa Pleicones by a vote of 102–58.

In 1982, he presided over the trial of Edward Lee Elmore, an intellectually disabled man who was convicted and sentenced to death. The trial is illustrated and criticised intensely by investigative journalist Raymond Bonner in his book Anatomy of Injustice: A Murder Case Gone Wrong (2012).
