= John Hardin Marion =

American judge

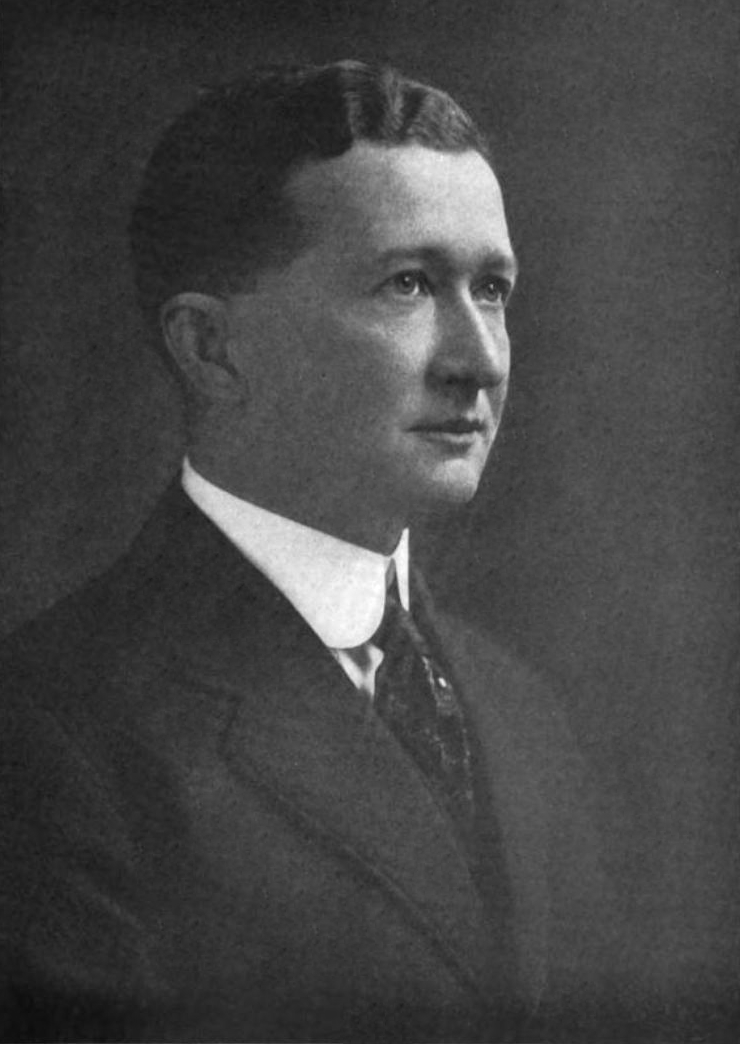

Associate Justice of South Carolina
- In office January 19, 1922 – January 1, 1926
- Preceded by: George W. Gage
- Succeeded by: Eugene Satterwhite Blease

Personal details
- Born: October 23, 1874 Richburg, South Carolina, US
- Died: May 3, 1944 (aged 69) Charlotte, North Carolina
- Spouse: Mary Pagan Davidson
- Education: University of South Carolina (A.B. and J.D.)
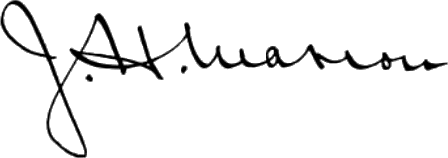
- Signature

John Hardin Marion (1874-1944) was an associate justice of the South Carolina Supreme Court. His predecessor, Justice Gage's, term was to expire on August 1, 1922, and the Statehouse held an election soon after Marion had been elected to fill the remaining term of his predecessor; the length of the term was beyond what would have permitted the governor to simply appoint a successor. The Statehouse was unable to choose a successor for the new term to start in August 1921 despite thirty-nine ballots over several weeks; on March 4, 1921, the General Assembly agreed to delay the selection of a new justice until the 1922 term, leaving the position unfilled for several months. When the legislature reconvened in January 1922, Marion was finally elected on the forty-seventh ballot. The drawn-out balloting was merely to fill the unexpired term of Justice Gage; the Statehouse then, on January 18, 1922, quickly elected Marion to not just finish the unexpired term but to fill a complete term thereafter. he left the court to take a position in Charlotte, North Carolina working for Duke Power. He was sworn in on January 19, 1922. He resigned from his position as justice in January 1926, and left to teach at Duke University.

He died in Charlotte, North Carolina on May 3, 1944, and was buried at Evergreen Cemetery in Chester, South Carolina.
