= Harold Mitchell Jr. =

American politician

Member of the South Carolina House of Representatives from the 31st district
- In office 2005–2017
- Preceded by: Brenda Lee (politician)
- Succeeded by: Rosalyn Henderson-Myers

Personal details
- Born: June 3, 1965 (age 61) Spartanburg, South Carolina, United States
- Party: Democratic

Harold Mitchell Jr. (born June 3, 1965) is an American politician from Spartanburg. He was a Democratic member of the South Carolina House of Representatives from the 31st District, serving from 2005 to 2017.

In 2012, he pled guilty to two charges of failing to file state tax returns and was suspended from office following his indictment on felony tax charges.

He resigned from office on May 5, 2017, on the advice of his doctors.
