= Susan Pringle Frost =

- Born: January 21, 1873; Miles Brewton House, 27 King Street, Charleston, South Carolina
- Died: October 6, 1960; Miles Brewton House, 27 King Street, Charleston, South Carolina
- Occupations: Historic preservationist, real estate agent

Susan Pringle Frost (January 21, 1873 – October 6, 1960) was the organizer and first president of the Preservation Society of Charleston. She was a leader in the suffrage movement in Charleston, South Carolina and an important proponent of the preservation of Charleston's historic buildings.She fought for women's suffrage and was the first female to own real estate. She fought for equals rights and preserved a historic landmark in Charleston called rainbow row which is still up today.

== Formative years ==
Susan Pringle Frost was born in 1873 to Francis LeJau Frost and Rebecca Brewton Pringle in the Miles Brewton House, a house which her family had owned since 1765.

When her family's plantations and her father's fertilizer business declined, Frost returned to Charleston from school in North Carolina and began taking stenography classes so she could help support her family.

== Business career and activism ==
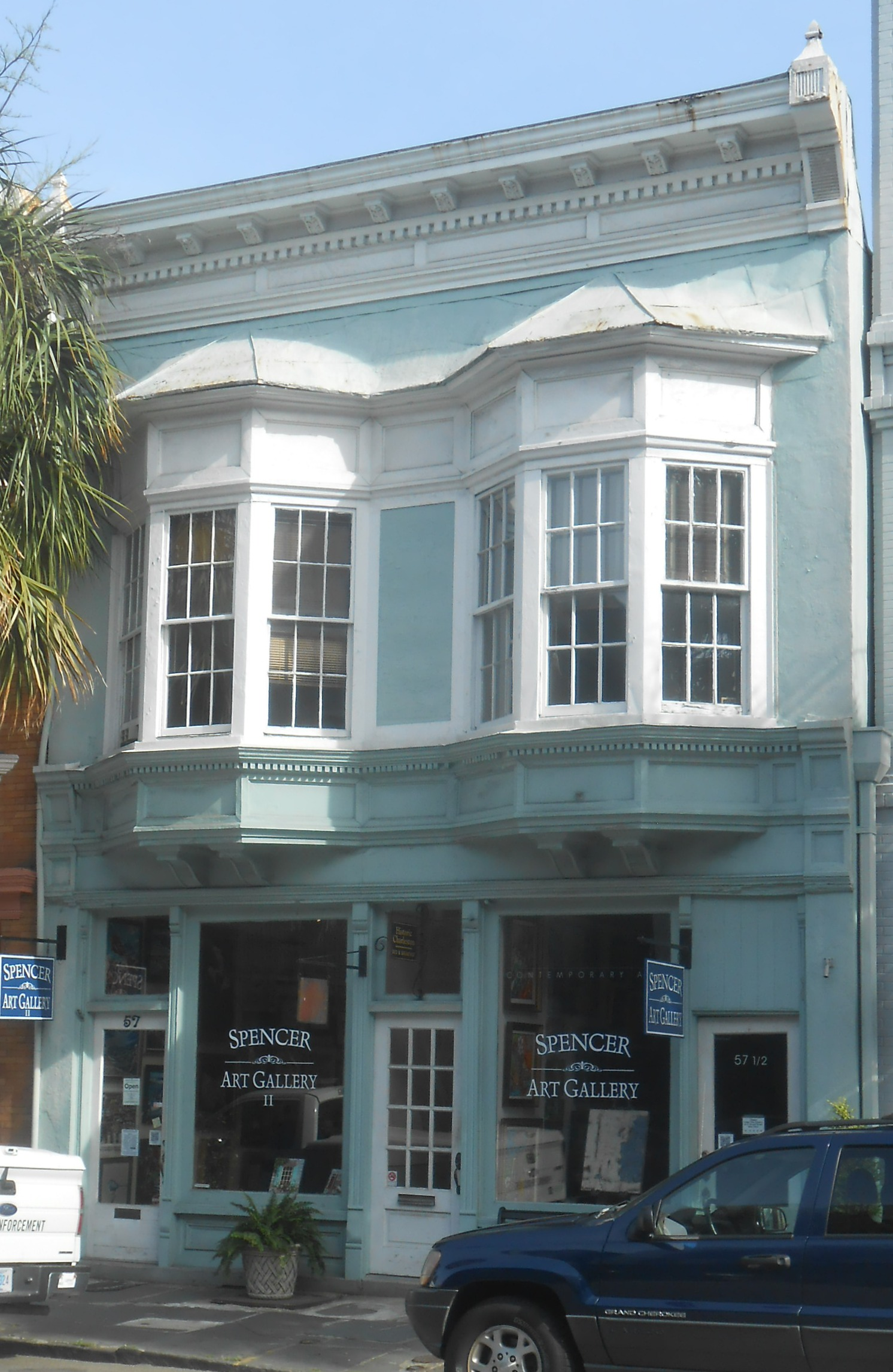
Frost opened her real estate firm at 57 Broad Street in 1920

In 1901, Frost started working as the secretary for Bradford Gilbert, the architect for the 1901–1902 South Carolina Interstate and West Indian Exposition in Charleston, South Carolina. She began working in real estate in 1909 while she was a court reporter, and she opened her own real estate office in 1920.

In 1913, she formed the Equal Suffrage League in Charleston and also joined the National Women's Party. She was the first president of the Charleston Equal Suffrage League.

The Joseph Manigault House on Meeting Street was threatened with demolition for a gas station. In response, on April 21, 1920, Frost convened the first meeting with 31 others of the Society for the Preservation of Old Dwellings. That organization became the Preservation Society of Charleston.

Frost combined both her interest in real estate and preservation when she bought many historic buildings in Charleston, restored them, and then resold them. She was especially involved in the area near East Bay Street and Tradd Street; her decision to paint a house a pastel color after restoring it was a precedent for other restorations of houses that are today known as Rainbow Row.

== Death, funeral and legacy ==
Frost died at the Miles Brewton House on October 6, 1960. Her funeral was held at St. Michael's Episcopal Church in Charleston.

She was added to the South Carolina Hall of Fame in 2015.
