= James M. Brailsford Jr. =

American judge

Associate Justice of South Carolina
- In office 1962–1974
- Preceded by: George Dewey Oxner
- Succeeded by: George Gregory Jr.

Personal details
- Born: July 3, 1910 South Carolina, US
- Died: November 8, 1993 (aged 83)
- Spouse: Louise Tompkins
- Education: University of South Carolina

James M. Brailsford Jr. was an associate justice of the South Carolina Supreme Court. He served in the South Carolina House of Representatives from 1939 to 1942. Then, he was a state trial judge from 1947 to 1962. He was elected to the state Supreme Court in 1962 and served until his retirement in 1974. Justice Brailsford died on November 10, 1993.
