= James E. Moore (judge) =

American judge

Associate Justice of South Carolina
- In office December 30, 1991 – 2008
- Preceded by: David W. Harwell
- Succeeded by: John W. Kittredge

Personal details
- Born: March 13, 1936 (age 90) Laurens, South Carolina
- Spouse: Mary Deadwyler
- Education: Duke University (B.A. 1958, J.D. 1961)

James E. Moore (born March 13, 1936) was an associate justice of the South Carolina Supreme Court. Moore was born on March 13, 1936, in Laurens, South Carolina. He attended Duke University both as an undergraduate student and as a law student. Justice James E. Moore was elected to the Supreme Court of South Carolina on May 29, 1991 (and was sworn in on December 30, 1991) and re-elected to a ten-year term on May 6, 1998.
