= George Gregory Jr. =

American judge

George Tillman Gregory Jr.

Chief Justice of South Carolina
- In office February 26, 1988 – December 30, 1991
- Preceded by: Julius B. Ness
- Succeeded by: David W. Harwell

Associate Justice of South Carolina
- In office May 7, 1975 – 1988
- Preceded by: Thomas P. Bussey
- Succeeded by: Jean H. Toal

Personal details
- Born: December 13, 1921 McConnells, South Carolina, U.S.
- Died: January 23, 2003 (aged 81) Chester, South Carolina, U.S.
- Education: University of South Carolina

George Tillman Gregory Jr. (December 13, 1921 – January 23, 2003) was an associate justice and chief justice on the South Carolina Supreme Court. He began practicing law in 1944, served in the 1950s in the South Carolina Statehouse, and became a state trial court judge in 1956. He was sworn in as the chief justice on February 26, 1988. Although his term was to expire in 1994, Gregory gave notice of his retirement in 1991. Gregory died on January 23, 2003.
