= Benjamin Faneuil Dunkin =

South Carolina judge and politician

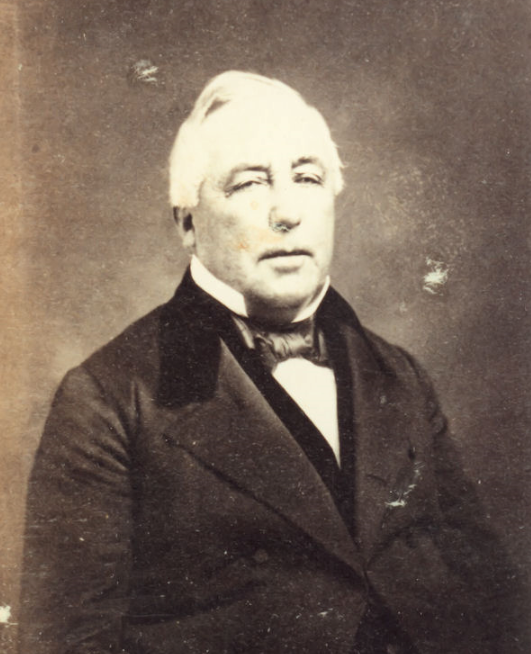

Chief Justice of South Carolina
- In office November 1, 1865 – 1868
- Preceded by: John Belton O'Neall
- Succeeded by: Franklin J. Moses Sr.

Personal details
- Born: December 2, 1792 Philadelphia, Pennsylvania, US
- Died: December 5, 1874 (aged 82) Charleston, South Carolina, US
- Spouse: Washington Sala Prentiss
- Education: Harvard University

Benjamin Faneuil Dunkin was a lawyer and politician who became chief justice of the South Carolina Supreme Court.

Born in Philadelphia, Pennsylvania on December 2, 1792, he was the son of Edmund Dunkin (died 1811), an immigrant from Ireland, and his wife Susanna Bethune, from a Scottish family settled in Boston, Massachusetts.

After graduating from Harvard University when he was eighteen, he moved to Charleston, South Carolina in 1811. He was elected to the South Carolina House of Representatives and served as its Speaker in 1828 and 1829. Between 1865 and 1868, he was chief justice of the South Carolina Supreme Court. He died on December 5, 1874, at his home in Charleston, South Carolina.

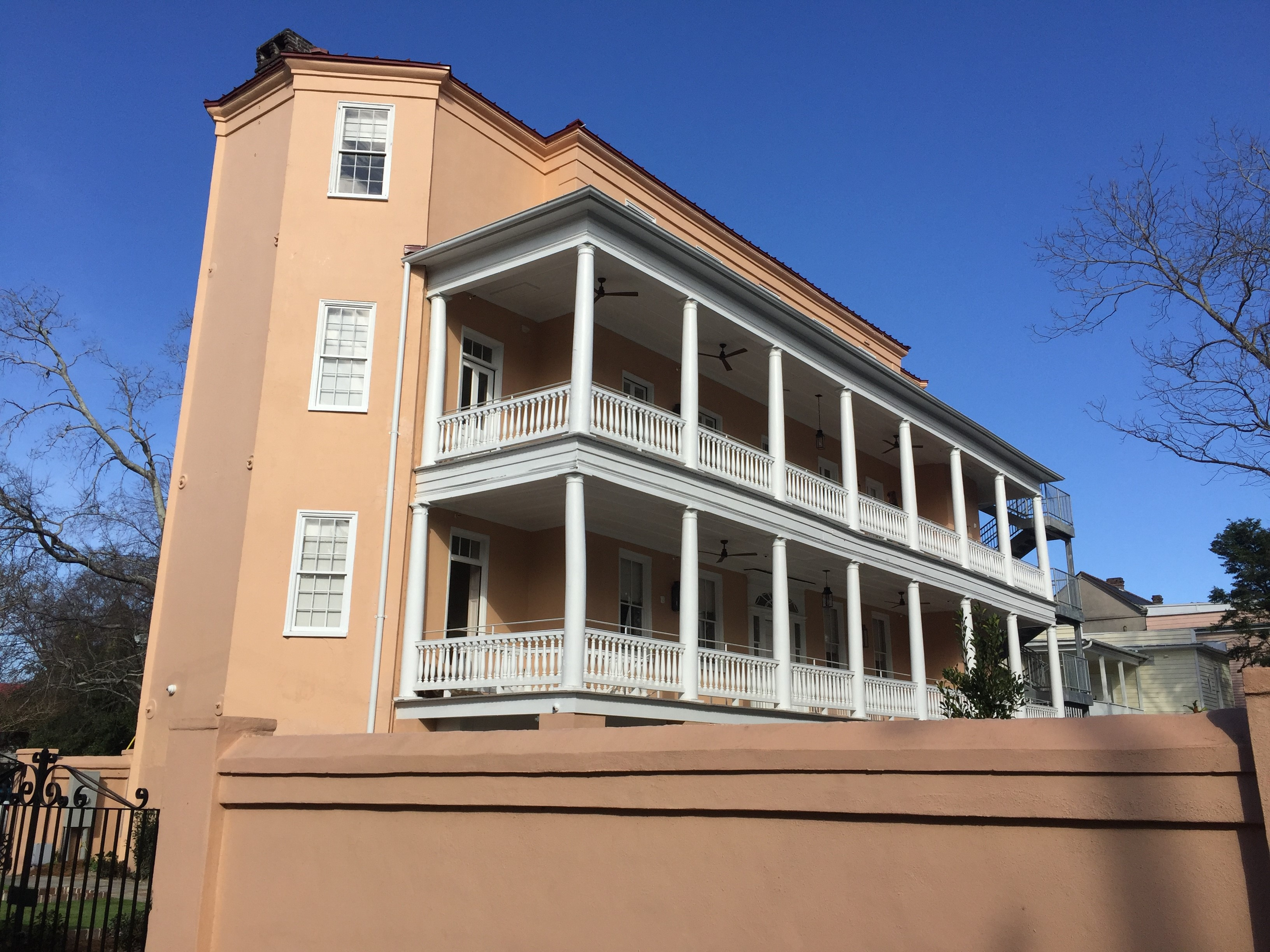
Benjamin Faneuil Duncan built his house with fine Regency interiors in about 1823 at 89 Warren Street, Charleston, South Carolina and lived there until 1870.

On January 18, 1820, in Washington, District of Columbia, he married Washington Sara Prentiss (1800–1870) and they had three children who all married and raised families: Alfred Huger Dunkin (1822–1906); Mary Augusta Dunkin (1826–1865); and Anna Washington Dunkin (1829–1878).
