= Judge Moss =

Judge Moss may refer to:

- J. McKenzie Moss (1868–1929), judge of the United States Court of Claims
- Randolph Moss (born 1961), judge of the United States District Court for the District of Columbia

== See also ==
- Justice Moss (disambiguation)
