= Claude A. Taylor =

American judge

Claude Ambrose Taylor

Chief Justice of South Carolina
- In office 1961 – January 21, 1966
- Preceded by: Taylor Hudnall Stukes
- Succeeded by: Joseph Rodney Moss

Associate Justice of South Carolina
- In office January 1944 – 1961
- Preceded by: David Gordon Baker
- Succeeded by: James Woodrow Lewis

50th Speaker of the South Carolina House of Representatives
- In office 1935–1936
- Preceded by: James Gibson
- Succeeded by: Solomon Blatt Sr.

Personal details
- Born: August 24, 1902 Gilbert, South Carolina, US
- Died: January 21, 1966 (aged 63)
- Spouse: Mary Young Cooper
- Education: University of South Carolina (LL.B., 1926)

Claude A. Taylor (1902–1966) was an American politician and jurist who served as chief justice on the South Carolina Supreme Court. He was born in 1902 in Gilbert, South Carolina. He spent ten years serving in the General Assembly of South Carolina including as the House of Representatives' Speaker between 1935 and 1936. In 1944, Taylor gained election to the South Carolina Supreme Court and became its chief justice in 1961. Taylor began the practice of opening sessions of the court with a prayer. He died on January 21, 1966.
