= John H. Waller (judge) =

American judge

Associate Justice of the South Carolina Supreme Court
- In office June 29, 1994 – 2008
- Preceded by: A. Lee Chandler
- Succeeded by: Kaye Gorenflo Hearn

Personal details
- Born: October 31, 1937 (age 88) Mullins, South Carolina
- Education: Wofford College (A.B. 1959), University of South Carolina (J.D. 1963)

John Henry Waller Jr. (born October 31, 1937) is an associate justice of the South Carolina Supreme Court. After a period of military service, he enrolled at the University of South Carolina's law school and graduated in 1963. In 1967, he was elected to the South Carolina House of Representatives and served five terms. In 1976, he was elected to the South Carolina Senate. While serving as a senator, he was elected as a trial court judge and was qualified on June 6, 1980. He was elected to the South Carolina Supreme Court on May 11, 1994, and was sworn in on June 29, 1994.
