= James S. Cothran =

American politician and lawyer (1830–1897)

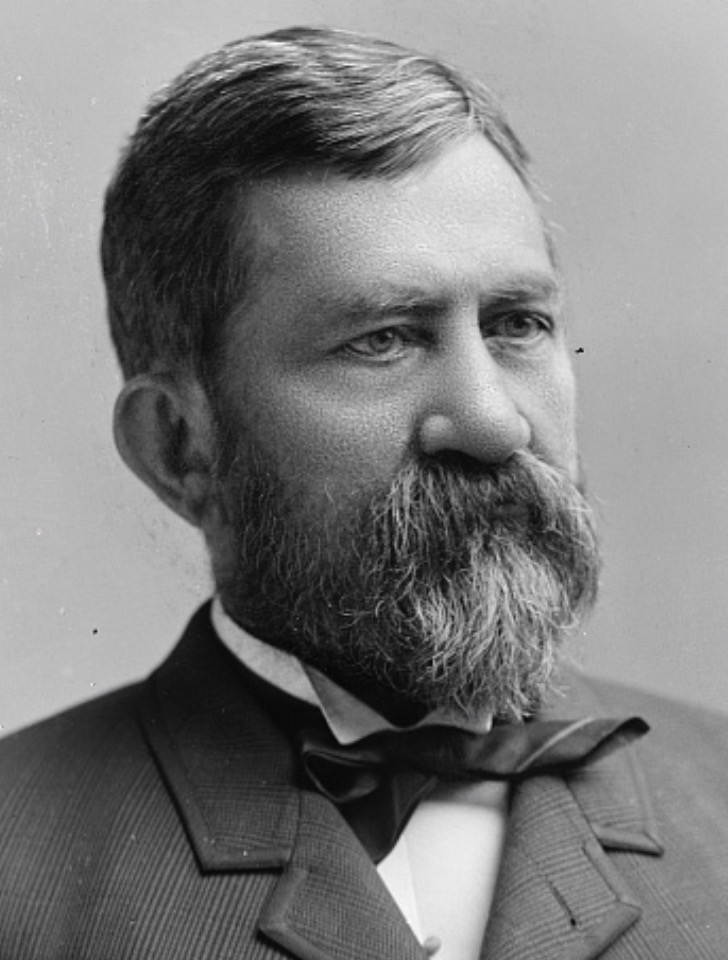
- Portrait of Cothran by Charles Milton Bell, taken between 1873 and 1890

Member of the U.S. House of Representatives from South Carolina's 3rd district
- In office March 4, 1887 – March 3, 1891
- Preceded by: D. Wyatt Aiken
- Succeeded by: George Johnstone

Member of the South Carolina Senate from the Abbeville County district
- In office 1867

Personal details
- Born: James Sproull Cothran; August 8, 1830 Abbeville County, South Carolina, US
- Died: December 5, 1897 (aged 67) New York City, US
- Resting place: Upper Long Cane Cemetery
- Party: Democratic
- Relations: Thomas C. Perrin (father-in-law)
- Children: 4, including Thomas
- Occupation: Politician, lawyer

Military service
- Allegiance: Confederate States of America
- Branch/service: Confederate States Army
- Years of service: 1861–1865
- Rank: Captain
- Unit: 1st South Carolina Rifle Regiment
- Battles/wars: American Civil War; Second Battle of Bull Run; Battle of Chancellorsville; Battle of North Anna; Battle of Appomattox Court House

James Sproull Cothran (August 8, 1830 – December 5, 1897) was an American politician and lawyer. A Democrat, he was a member of the United States House of Representatives from South Carolina.

== Early life and military service ==
Cothran was born on August 8, 1830, near Abbeville, South Carolina. His father was banker and railroader Wade Samuel Cothran, and his mother was Frances Elizabeth (née Sproull) Cothran, who was a relative of colonial official William Caldwell and politician John C. Calhoun. He was of Scottish descent, being an ancestor of Clan Cochrane.

Educated at a local school, Cothran attended Erskine College, graduating from the University of Georgia in 1852. He studied law in Abbeville under Thomas C. Perrin, who had previously been a member of the South Carolina General Assembly. In either 1853 or December 1854, was admitted to the bar. He owned slaves.

During the American Civil War, in July 1861, Cothran enlisted Company B of the 1st South Carolina Rifle Regiment, whch was part of the Army of Northern Virginia. Over his service, he achieved the rank of captain. He fought in the Second Battle of Bull Run, where he broke his right leg from a Minié ball; in the Battle of Chancellorsville, where he received an injury to his right wrist; and in the Battle of North Anna, where he was shot in the face. Despite the injuries, he continued service until the Confederate surrender at the Battle of Appomattox Court House.

== Career ==
From 1854 to 1861, Cothran practiced law in Abbeville. After the war, in 1866, he returned to practicing law in Abbeville, partnering with Thomas Perrin. From 1876 to 1880, he was solicitor of the 8th South Carolina Circuit Court, then served as its judge from 1881 to 1886.

Cothran was a Democrat. In 1867, he represented Abbeville County in the South Carolina Senate. He was a delegate to the 1872 Democratic National Convention. In 1876, he was chairman of the Abbeville County Democratic Party. He served in the United States House of Representatives from March 4, 1887, to March 3, 1891, representing South Carolina's 3rd district. While in Congress, he was a member of the Committee on Foreign Affairs and the Committee on the Election of the President, Vice President and Representatives in Congress. He was not renominated for the following election.

From 1891 to 1897, Cothran practiced law in Greenville. In January 1890, he was made a legal counselor for the Richmond and Danville Railroad, remaining in the position until his death.

== Personal life and death ==
On July 17, 1855, Cothran married Emma Chiles Perrin, the daughter of Thomas Perrin. They had four children together, including judge and politician Thomas P. Cothran. He was Presbyterian. He died on December 5, 1897, aged 67, in New York City. He was buried at Upper Long Cane Cemetery.

U.S. House of Representatives
Preceded by D. Wyatt Aiken	Member of the U.S. House of Representatives from South Carolina's 3rd congressional district 1887–1891	Succeeded by George Johnstone
