= Preservation Society of Charleston =

Historic preservation organization in South Carolina, U.S.

Founded in 1920, the Preservation Society of Charleston is the oldest community-based historic preservation organization in the United States. Susan Pringle Frost founded the organization, first known as the Society for the Preservation of Old Dwellings, in 1920 along with a small group of friends.

The group met on April 21, 1920, at 20 South Battery (home of Mr. and Mrs. Ernest Pringle) and voted to try to save the circa 1803 Joseph Manigault House which was slated for demolition to make way for a gas station.

In 1931 the Society was instrumental in persuading Charleston City Council to pass the first zoning ordinance enacted to protect historic resources. The ordinance established the first Board of Architectural Review and designated a 138-acre (0.56 km^{2}) "Old and Historic District". The ordinance limited alterations to the exteriors of historic buildings and made provision for prosecuting violations.

In 1957 the Society took on its current name to reflect an expanded mission to protect not only dwellings but all sites and structures of historic significance or aesthetic value. The Society has sought to fulfill its mission through programs that focus on preservation education, advocacy, and planning. The Society was among the first organizations in South Carolina to accept exterior and interior preservation easements.

One of the best-known programs of the Society is its Carolopolis Award. Carolopolis Awards recognize excellent examples of preservation, renovation, restoration, and even new construction in Charleston. The awards are given each year in January. In 2017 the Society began using the awards as a fundraiser and started charging its members to attend.

The Society has also published a newsletter, Preservation Progress, since 1956.

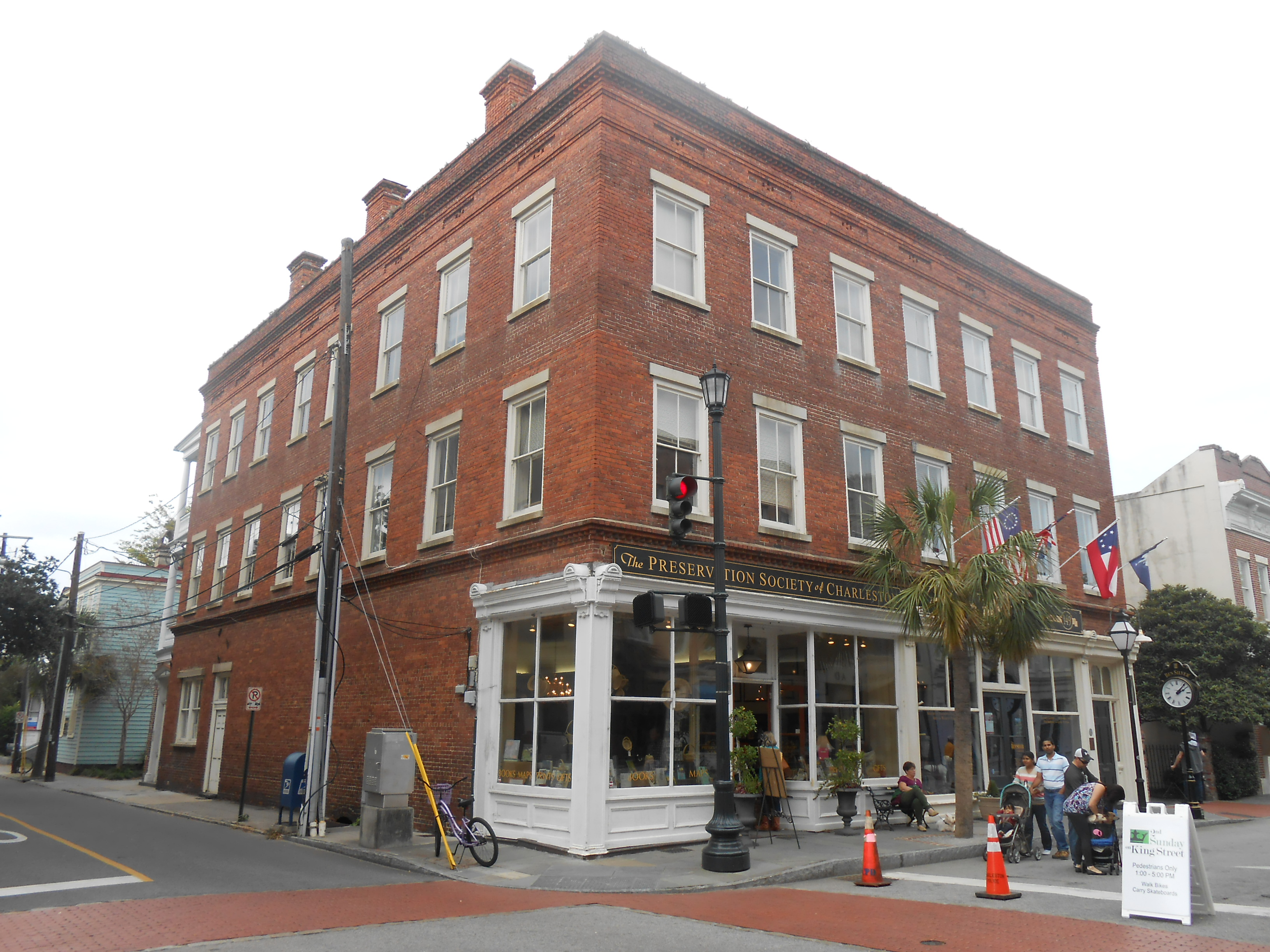
The Preservation Society of Charleston headquarters at 147 King St.

In recognition of its efforts, the American Institute of Architects presented the Preservation Society of Charleston with its 1996 Institute Honor Award. The award recognized the Society for "being as much a part of Charleston, South Carolina history as protector of it, this Society has wrought a standard of commitment to community befitting the beauty and rich legacy of the city it has served for over 75 years."

The Society has been headquartered at 147 King St., Charleston, South Carolina (at the corner of King St. and Queen St.) since 1978 in the circa 1878–1880 Ernest Hesse grocery.

== See also ==
- List of historical societies in South Carolina

== Sources ==
Walter Edgar Jr., ed. "The South Carolina Encyclopedia." 753-754. (2006) (ISBN 0-87249-643-0). Walter J. Fraser, Jr., Charleston! Charleston! 366, 377 (1989) (ISBN 1-57003-598-9).
