= George C. James =

American judge (born 1960)

George James
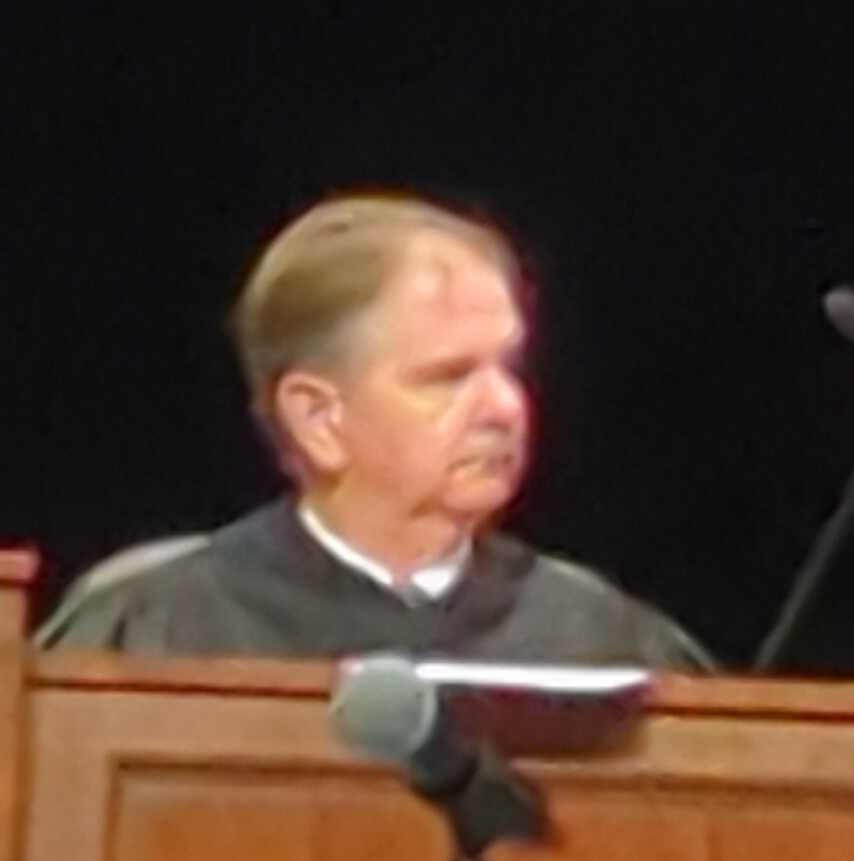

Justice of the South Carolina Supreme Court
- Incumbent
- Assumed office February 7, 2017
- Preceded by: Donald W. Beatty

Personal details
- Born: June 2, 1960 (age 66) Savannah, Georgia, U.S.
- Education: The Citadel (BS); University of South Carolina (JD)

George C. James, Jr (born June 2, 1960) is an American lawyer and judge, who serves as a justice of the South Carolina Supreme Court.

James was born in Savannah, Georgia in 1960. He was raised in Sumter, South Carolina, and graduated from Wilson Hall School in 1978. He completed a bachelor's degree in business administration at The Citadel in Charleston, South Carolina in 1982, and completed a J.D. degree at the University of South Carolina School of Law in 1985.

James was in private practice in South Carolina from 1985 to 2006. He worked for and became a partner with his father's law firm, Richardson, James and Player, which subsequently merged to become Lee, Erter, Wilson, James, Holler and Smith LLC in 2000.

James was elected by the South Carolina General Assembly to serve as a state judge on the South Carolina Circuit Court in 2006, for the Third Circuit, which covers four counties in eastern South Carolina: Clarendon, Lee, Sumter, and Williamsburg. He was re-elected to a second term in 2012.

The South Carolina General Assembly elected James to serve as a justice of the South Carolina Supreme Court in February 2017, to fill the remaining three years of the term of Donald W. Beatty, who was elevated to chief justice. The South Carolina General Assembly re-elected James to a new ten-year term on February 5, 2020.

James is a former member of the South Carolina Supreme Court's Commission on Continuing Legal Education and Specialization.

Legal offices
Preceded by Donald W. Beatty	Justice of the South Carolina Supreme Court; 2017–present	Incumbent
