= John W. Kittredge =

American judge (born 1956)

John Kittredge
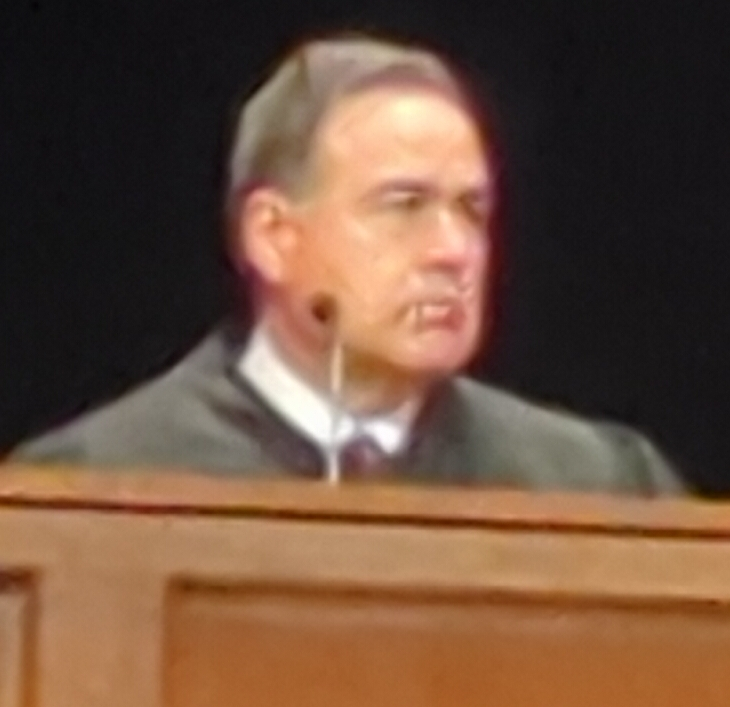

Chief Justice of the South Carolina Supreme Court
- Incumbent
- Assumed office August 1, 2024
- Preceded by: Donald W. Beatty

Justice of the South Carolina Supreme Court
- In office August 1, 2008 – July 31, 2024
- Preceded by: James Moore
- Succeeded by: Letitia H. Verdin

Personal details
- Born: September 28, 1956 (age 70) Greenville, South Carolina, U.S.
- Spouse: Lila Graham Hewell (m. 1981)
- Children: 3
- Education: University of South Carolina (BS, JD)

John W. Kittredge (born September 28, 1956) is the chief justice of the South Carolina Supreme Court.

== Early life and education ==
Kittredge was born on September 28, 1956, in Greenville, South Carolina to Elwyn Herbert Kittredge, Jr. and Marian Jeffries Kittredge. Growing up, he lived a few doors down from William Walter Wilkins. Later, when Wilkins was the solicitor, he facilitated Kittredge's internship with city police and recommended Kittredge explore law school.

Kittredge graduated from the University of South Carolina, summa cum laude, in 1979, and from its law school in 1982. He is a member of Phi Beta Kappa, the Order of the Coif and the Order of the Wig and Robe.

== Career ==
Kittredge began his career as a law clerk to William Walter Wilkins when he became a federal district judge. He also practiced in the Wilkins family law firm, Wilkins, Nelson and Kittredge. Kittredge is admitted to practice law before the U.S. Supreme Court, the Fourth Circuit, the federal District Court for South Carolina, the U.S. Court of Military Appeals and the District of Columbia Court of Appeals.

The South Carolina General Assembly elected Kittredge to the Family Court of the Thirteenth Circuit on May 8, 1991. On February 14, 1996, he was elected to an at-large seat on the Circuit Court; on May 6, 1998, he was elected to the Thirteenth Circuit's resident seat. In the 1996 report on his candidacy for the Circuit Court, the Bar found that lawyers who had practiced with him "referred to his work as impeccable and straightforward." Kittredge served as a Court of Appeals judge for the state from 2003 to 2008, first elected on May 28, 2003.

=== South Carolina Supreme Court ===
Elected to the South Carolina Supreme Court on February 6, 2008, to replace James E. Moore, Kittredge took office on August 1, 2008. He was elected by the General Assembly by acclamation.

In 2024, the South Carolina General Assembly elected him to succeed Donald W. Beatty as chief justice. Kittredge took office on August 1, 2024, with Beatty's retirement; his term runs through July 31, 2034.

== Personal life ==
Kittredge married Lila Graham Hewell on June 20, 1981. They have three children, six grandchildren, and attend First Presbyterian Church. Kittredge's friends have called him a fan of baseball.

Legal offices
Preceded by James Moore	Justice of the South Carolina Supreme Court; 2008–2024	Succeeded by Letitia H. Verdin
Preceded by Donald W. Beatty	Chief Justice of the South Carolina Supreme Court; 2024–present	Incumbent
