= Franklin J. Moses Sr. =

American attorney, planter, politician and judge (1804–1877)

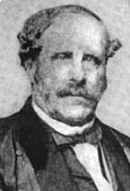

Chief Justice of South Carolina
- In office 1868 – March 6, 1877
- Preceded by: Benjamin Faneuil Dunkin
- Succeeded by: Ammiel J. Willard

Personal details
- Born: Israel Franklin Moses; August 13, 1804 Charleston, South Carolina
- Died: March 6, 1877 (aged 72)
- Spouse: Jane McLellan (also spelled McClenahan)
- Education: South Carolina College (now University of South Carolina)

Franklin J. Moses Sr. (born Israel Franklin Moses; August 13, 1804 – March 6, 1877) was an attorney, planter, politician and judge in South Carolina. He served as a state senator from 1841 to 1866, when he was elected to the circuit court. He was elected as Chief Justice of the State Supreme Court in 1868 during the Reconstruction era. In 1876 he was asked to rule on a challenge to election returns in the hotly disputed gubernatorial campaign, eventually won by Democrat Wade Hampton and ending Republican domination in the state.

== Early life ==
Franklin J. Moses was born in 1804 as Israel Franklin Moses into a Jewish family in Charleston to Major Myer Moses and Esther (Hetty) Phillips. His mother was one of 22 children of Jonas Phillips and his wife Rebecca Machado, was from a prominent Portuguese-Jewish family in Philadelphia, Pennsylvania. His middle name was in honor of Benjamin Franklin, the statesman from Philadelphia.

Upon completing his early education in Charleston, Moses attended South Carolina College in 1819 and graduated in 1823. He returned to Charleston to study law under the tutelage of James L. Petigru. After being admitted to the bar in 1825, he moved to the state capital of Columbia.

At the urging of Judge J. S. Richardson in Clarendon, Moses was persuaded to practice law in Sumterville in a neighboring county; it was also in the rapidly developing Piedmont area of the state. This area became developed for the commodity crop of cotton and was dominated by large plantations based on enslaved African-American labor. The only possessions Moses took with him were a few law books and a ten-dollar bill; but he was determined to make his home in Sumterville.

== Career ==
Moses entered a practice with John L. Wilson. From the beginning, he applied two principles - to avoid prosecution of a man in the criminal courts if his life was in danger, and on the civil side, to support only those suits that had real merit. He quickly established a good reputation in Sumterville and was elected as captain of a company of cavalry, the Claremont Troop. In 1832, Moses and his younger brother Montgomery Moses established the law firm of F. J. and M. Moses, and their practice became well known across the state.

During the Nullification Crisis, Moses was opposed to secession. He served as a secretary for the Union Convention held in Columbia in 1832. When the state divided between the secessionists and cooperationists in 1852, Moses sided with the latter. Entering a special election to the state Senate in 1841, he defeated two other candidates. He served in the state Senate until 1866, and he was the chairman of the judiciary committee for most of his time in the Senate.

After South Carolina seceded in 1860, Moses offered his services to the state. He went to North Carolina to persuade its legislature also to vote for secession. He served for a short time on the staff of General Henry A. Wise, stationed in what became West Virginia, but returned to South Carolina because he could not endure the rigors of campaigning.

From 1850 to 1865, Moses was a member of the board of trustees at South Carolina College; he taught law at the institution for several years afterward.

Following the end of the war, in 1866 Moses was elected as a Circuit Court judge. On July 29, 1868, he was elected to the South Carolina Supreme Court as chief justice. His election by a Radical Republican-dominated state legislature diminished his standing among his peers. Many classified him as a scalawag, a southerner who supported Reconstruction.

But, his ruling in favor of Democratic candidate Wade Hampton during the turbulent gubernatorial election of 1876 restored his status as a leading South Carolinian, as it marked the Democrats regaining political control of the state. There had been widespread violence in the weeks before the election to suppress black voting, and egregious election fraud during polling, with both Edgefield and Laurens counties recording votes for Hampton far in excess of the total number of registered voters. Moses died on March 6, 1877, the day before he was to deliver the ruling.

He was buried at Sumter Cemetery in Sumter. On his tombstone was inscribed Vir probus et justus ("A just and honest man").

== Personal life ==
In 1830, Moses acquired two lots in Sumterville for a residence on the north side of Republican (now East Hampton) Street in between Main and Harvin streets. At about that time, he reversed the order of his first and middle names, and became known as Franklin I. Moses.

Moses married Jane McLellan (also spelled McClenahan) of Chesterfield, who was a devout Methodist and avid gardener. They had one son, Franklin Israel Moses Jr. Some people confused his middle initial as the letter "J," and thereafter both father and son used Franklin J. Moses, or F. J. Moses. Moses was raised as a Jew, but later left the religion. His wife did not convert to Judaism, and their son was raised in the Episcopal Church of the South Carolina elite. F.J. Moses Jr. also became an attorney, being elected to the state legislature during the Reconstruction era and in 1872 as Governor of South Carolina. Democrats classified him as a scalawag.

== Legacy and honors ==
- The senior Moses was conferred an honorary LL.D. the University of South Carolina. His son, who as Governor of South Carolina was the ex officio chairman of the Board of Trustees, presented the degree in a ceremony.

== See also ==
- List of Jewish American jurists
