= Letitia H. Verdin =

American judge (born 1970)

Letitia Verdin

Associate Justice of the South Carolina Supreme Court
- Incumbent
- Assumed office July 31, 2024
- Preceded by: John W. Kittredge

Personal details
- Born: 1970 (age 55–56) Seneca, South Carolina, U.S.
- Spouse: Charles Verdin (m. 1997)
- Education: Furman University (BS); University of South Carolina (JD)

Letitia Hamilton Verdin (born 1970) is an Associate Justice of the South Carolina Supreme Court.

== Education and personal life ==
Verdin was born in Seneca, South Carolina to Angela and Harry Hamilton. She graduated in 1988 as valedictorian from Seneca Senior High School. She received a Bachelor of Science in Biology from Furman University in 1992 and a Juris Doctor from the University of South Carolina Law School in 1997. Verdin is married to attorney Charles "Chuck" Verdin.

== Career ==
After graduating law school, Verdin worked as an assistant solicitor in SC's 8th judicial circuit while also working in a private law firm.

In 2008 the state's General Assembly elected Verdin to fill the vacancy on the thirteenth circuit family court created by the elevation of Judge Aphrodite Konduros to the state's Court of Appeals.

In 2010, she was elected to replace the vacancy on the SC Circuit Court created by John Cannon Few's elevation to Chief Judge of the Court of Appeals.

In 2023, Verdin was elected to fill a vacancy on the Court of Appeals.

After the withdrawal of two other judges, Verdin was the sole candidate to fill the upcoming vacancy on the South Carolina Supreme Court caused by the elevation of Justice John W. Kittredge to Chief Justice. On June 5, 2024, Verdin was elected 152–0 by the South Carolina General Assembly to the Supreme Court.

Legal offices
Preceded by John W. Kittredge	Associate Justice of the South Carolina Supreme Court; 2024–present	Incumbent
