= South Carolina Supreme Court =

Highest court in the U.S. state of South Carolina

Supreme Court of South Carolina
- Interactive map of Supreme Court of South Carolina
- Established: 1868
- Jurisdiction: South Carolina
- Location: Columbia
- Motto: Nil ultra (Latin: Nothing beyond)
- Composition method: Election by the General Assembly
- Authorised by: S.C. Const. art. V, §§ 1-2
- Appeals to: Supreme Court of the United States
- Appeals from: South Carolina Court of Appeals; South Carolina Circuit Court
- Judge term length: Ten years, staggered
- Number of positions: 5
- Website: Official website

Chief Justice
- Currently: John W. Kittredge
- Since: August 1, 2024
- Lead position ends: 2028
- Jurist term ends: 2028

The Supreme Court of South Carolina is the highest court in the U.S. state of South Carolina. The court is composed of a chief justice and four associate justices.

== Judicial selection ==
State supreme court justices serve ten-year terms and may serve multiple terms on the court. However, state trial and appellate judges have a mandatory retirement age of 72.

South Carolina is one of two states where the state legislature elects state court judges, including the justices on the state supreme court. A ten-person committee (composed mostly of state legislators) called the Judicial Merit Selection Commission (JMSC) winnows down the number of candidates to fill a judicial vacancy to three based on candidate qualifications. The General Assembly then chooses from one of these three candidates to fill a judicial vacancy. However, candidates who gauge a lack of support amongst the General Assembly often drop out of the race, leaving only one candidate to vote for.

Prior to 2025, the JMSC was composed of five members appointed by the House Speaker of the South Carolina House of Representatives, three members appointed by the Senate Judiciary Committee chairman, and two members appointed by the South Carolina Senate president. South Carolina statutory law requires that six of the ten JMSC members be state legislators.

The judicial selection process has been criticized by commentators for its opacity. Following a South Carolina Supreme Court opinion that struck down the state's six-week abortion ban, state legislators began to deliberate on reforms to the judicial selection process, and Governor Henry McMaster echoed these concerns in his 2023 State of the State address. In 2024, the state passed legislation that expanded the JMSC to twelve, including four gubernatorial appointments, and imposed term limits.

== Current justices of the court ==
Name	Born	Start	Term ends	Mandatory retirement	Law school
John W. Kittredge, Chief Justice	September 28, 1956 (age 69)	August 1, 2008	2028	2028	South Carolina
George C. James	June 2, 1960 (age 66)	February 7, 2017	2030	2032	South Carolina
D. Garrison Hill	July 14, 1964 (age 62)	February 9, 2023	2030	2036	South Carolina
Letitia H. Verdin	1970 (age 55–56)	August 1, 2024	2034	2044	South Carolina
Vacant					

=== Vacancy and pending nomination ===
Vacator	Reason	Vacancy Date	Nominee	Nomination Date
John Few	Retirement	July 31, 2026	Pending	TBD

== Jurisdiction ==
The court has both original and appellate jurisdiction. It exercises exclusive appellate jurisdiction for all state cases regarding the death penalty, state utility rates, judgments involving public bonded indebtedness and elections, and orders limiting state grand juries and relating to abortions by minors. Original jurisdiction pertains to the issuance writs including mandamus, certiorari, and very extraordinary bills.

== Additional charges of the court ==
The South Carolina Supreme Court oversees the admission of individuals to practice law in the state. Much of the administration regarding admissions and practice is delegated to the South Carolina Bar, established by statute as an administrative arm of the court; however, the court retains ultimate authority in South Carolina governing the practice of law. It also supervises the disciplining of attorneys and suspension of those no longer able to practice due to mental or physical condition.

== History ==
- Supreme Court of South Carolina Building
- U.S. National Register of Historic Places
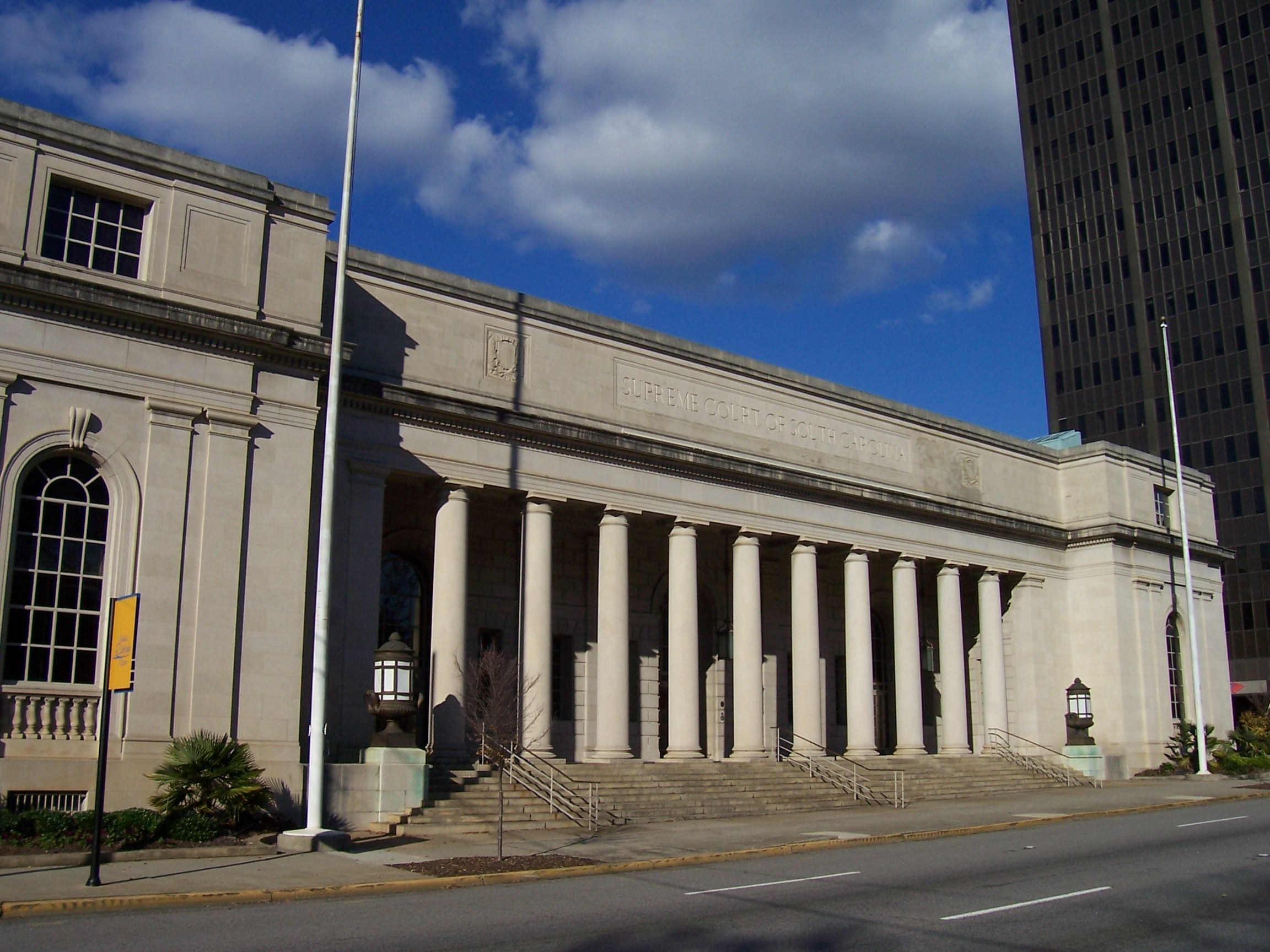
- Supreme Court of South Carolina Building, December 2009

- Location within South Carolina Location within the United States
- Location: 1231 Gervais St., Columbia, South Carolina
- Coordinates: 34°0′6″N 81°1′57″W
- Area: 0.5 acres (0.20 ha)
- Built: 1917–1921
- Architect: Gill & Wilkins; Andrew V. Kerns
- NRHP reference No.: 72001220
- Added to NRHP: October 18, 1972

The Supreme Court of South Carolina Building is located in the state capital of Columbia. The court moved into its current location, a former United States Post Office building, in 1971. It was built between 1917 and 1921, and is a two-story, Neo-Classical style building. The building has been listed on the National Register of Historic Places since 1972. Prior to 1971, the court met in a section of the South Carolina State House in an area totaling approximately 1,400 square feet (130 m^{2}); the justices did not have individual offices, but instead met in a common conference room when not presiding over a session of court.

Controversy arose in late 2007 after The State newspaper reported that the Supreme Court reversed the grades of 20 people who failed the South Carolina bar exam, including children of prominent attorneys, by voiding the results of the wills, trusts, and estates section of the exam.

From 1930 to 2016, the South Carolina Supreme Court had 17 Chief Justices.
