= Town of Mt. Pleasant v. Chimento =

Town of Mt. Pleasant v. Chimento was a South Carolina case that ruled that while poker was a game of skill, the Dominant Factor Test is not demonstrably a legal standard in South Carolina and thus poker is still subject to the laws related to gambling. The case was later appealed to a higher South Carolina district court where the Judge overturned the trial court's convictions, stating that Dominant Factor Test was the appropriate legal standard and therefore participating in a private home poker game is not illegal, nor is it gambling. The Judge further declared sections of the 207-year-old statute unconstitutionally vague and therefore void. In 2012, the South Carolina Supreme Court upheld the statute and reinstated the convictions of the defendants.

South Carolina law, specifically Section 16-19-40 ("Unlawful games and betting") of the Code of Laws, originally written in 1802, provides that "any game with cards or dice" played "at any tavern, inn, store ... or in any house used as a place of gaming" is illegal. While this is now being interpreted to mean gambling (betting is mentioned in the statute), a literal reading of the law would mean that games such as Sorry! and Monopoly are technically illegal in South Carolina.

== Background ==
In April 2006, about 20 poker players were arrested when police in Mt. Pleasant, South Carolina, raided a weekly home poker game. The players were charged under South Carolina state statute 16-19-40 "Unlawful Games and Betting" which had been written and enacted by the South Carolina state legislature 204 years before, in 1802, during the first term of Thomas Jefferson's Presidency. All of the poker players, except Bob Chimento, Scott Richards, Michael Williamson, Jeremy Brestel, and John Taylor Willis agreed to a plea bargain and paid fines of no more than $300. The remaining five players fought the arrest and forced the prosecution to take the case to court.

Jeff Phillips, the attorney for the accused, said, "The particular law in South Carolina is so antiquated and so garbled that it's virtually indecipherable. At some point, you need to look at the facts. Poker is not like any other game in the casino. Poker is predominantly a game of skill, therefore it should be treated differently."

SC 16-19-40, as applied to private home card games, has been rarely and sporadically enforced in its 204-year history. This has led some to raise questions of constitutional "equal protection" issues in regards to its selective enforcement. As some have noted the forfeiture aspects of the statute, which allows law enforcement agencies to keep money confiscated, may be a motivating factor in its application.

In presenting his clients' defense, Phillips brought in two expert witnesses: Mike Sexton, the commentator for the World Poker Tour, and Professor Robert Hannum. Hannum was the expert witness who participated in the Colorado case Colorado v. Raley where the defendants were found not guilty. The two expert witnesses were intended to demonstrate that poker was a game of skill and thus fulfilled the requirements of the Dominant Factor Test.

The key phrase the defense focused upon was "house used as a place of gaming." As both the defense and prosecutor agreed that gaming meant "gambling", the defense focused upon the notion that "this case ... turns entirely on whether poker is gambling." The defense thus based its strategy on demonstrating that poker was a game of skill and thus not gambling.

== Verdict ==
According to South Carolina law, it is a misdemeanor to play cards or dice in many locations, including a person's house. As gambling generally involves three elements: prize, consideration, and chance, the defense introduced a great deal of testimony to the effect that poker is a game of skill. In issuing his verdict, the judge wrote, "This Court…finds that Texas Hold‐em is a game of skill. The evidence and studies are overwhelming that this is so." The judge, however, found the defendants guilty because the defense failed to show that South Carolina's legislative or judicial system accepted the Dominant Factor Test as normative in the state. "[T]his Court," the judge wrote, "will not set itself to definitively conclude that this State will or does follow the 'Dominant Test' Theory." An appeal by the defense is expected.

== Appeal to South Carolina District Court and outcome ==
In August 2009, the case was appealed to the 9th Circuit District Court of South Carolina, Judge Markley Dennis presiding. After hearing oral arguments and taking consideration of written briefs, Judge Dennis found unequivocally in favor of the Defendant's position that Texas' Hold'em was a game of skill and not chance, as legally defined by the "Predominance Test," and overturned their convictions and fines. Furthermore, Judge Dennis found not only that the defendant's conduct did not violate the law as it was written, holding that Texas Hold'em poker was a game of skill and not chance, but also that sections of SC 16-19-40 were unconstitutionally vague and therefore void.

After the District Court's decision on October 1, 2009, South Carolina Attorney General and 2010 South Carolina gubernatorial candidate, Henry McMaster, decided to take control of the case from Mount Pleasant City Attorney Ira Grossman (who had been categorically unsuccessful during the initial appeal) and filed a notice of appeal to the South Carolina State Supreme Court. The case is expected to be scheduled for a hearing sometime in 2010.

== Appeal to the South Carolina Supreme Court ==
On October 1, 2009, South Carolina Attorney General Henry McMaster took control of the case, from Mount Pleasant City Attorney Ira Grossman, and in late December 2009 filed a formal appeal to the South Carolina Supreme Court. This after the South Carolina 9th circuit district court declared that sections of South Carolina 16-10-40 as void for being both unconstitutionally broad and unconstitutionally vague.

The South Carolina District court also declared that even if the constitutional issues were not considered, that home games of poker would not be subject to a charge under SC 16-19-40, as it was a game of skill and not a game of chance under the "Dominant Theory Test.", The Dominant Theory Test or "Predominance Test" is a legal concept and established precedent which courts have used to judge whether an activity is gambling/game of chance or a game of skill.

On January 22, 2004, the South Carolina Attorney General's Office, in a formal opinion, had stated that the Dominant Theory Test was the proper legal standard in South Carolina to judge whether an activity was gambling or a legal game of skill under SC 16-19-40.

In the formal 2004 opinion that while McMaster's office clearly states that the Dominant Theory Test is the proper legal standard, that the South Carolina Attorney General's Office did not feel that Poker met this standard and was thus illegal.

In his 2009 appeal brief to the South Carolina Supreme Court, McMaster contradicted his office's formal opinion in 2004 stating that the Dominant Theory Test was not the proper legal standard and declared that "that 'chance' need not be determined with respect to a particular game for purpose of the gambling statute" and "that the Legislature sought to ban all 'gaming' for stakes at designated locations." As of March 2010, the South Carolina Supreme Court had yet to indicate whiter it will agree to hear the case.

== The South Carolina Supreme Court ==
In the summer of 2010, the South Carolina Supreme Court agreed to hear oral arguments in the case. The hearing was set for October 19, 2010.

On October 19, 2010 oral arguments were heard in the case by the South Carolina Supreme Court. During oral arguments, Senior Assistant Attorney General Havird "Sonny" Jones contradicted his office's own written brief in the case and said "It is our position that this statute does not encompass the Friday night poker game or the penny ante bridge game,"

In the State's official written appeal brief submitted to the Court the Attorney General's Office wrote:

"One obvious reason that 'chance' need not be determined with respect to a particular reason game for purpose of the gambling statute is that the Legislature sought to ban all 'gaming' for stakes at designated locations,"

Chief Justice Jean H. Toal commented on the obvious contradiction by stating: "I am surprised that you made that concession." "That there are some forms of personal card playing in your home, among friends, that involve money, that are not gaming."

The State further asserted that they were no longer pursuing the legal question of skill vs chance as it pertains to what constitutes "gambling", as well as no longer asserting, as they had in the written brief, that all forms of cards games for money in any location listed in South Carolina statute 16-19-40 was illegal. The State now asserted that it would focus on what constitutes a "gambling house."

Justice Toal once again pointed out the vagueness and inconsistency of the statute and the Attorney General's office's new position during oral arguments by stating: "We're stuck with a very old statute that doesn't say one word about betting anything,"

=== Decision ===
On November 21, 2012 the South Carolina Supreme Court issued their decision. Justice Costa M. Pleicones wrote for the majority, upholding the statute as constitutional and affirming the defendants' convictions. However, the court declined to adopt the Dominant Factor Test, stating only that "[w]hether an activity is gaming/gambling is not dependent upon the relative roles of chance and skill, but whether there is money or something of value wagered on the game's outcome."

Chief Justice Toal concurred in the judgment but argued that the law was unconstitutional (though the defendants' conduct would have excluded them from challenging the law's constitutionality in good faith), and urged the South Carolina General Assembly to modernize the state's gambling statutes. Justice Kaye Gorenflo Hearn dissented in a separate opinion, arguing that the law was unconstitutionally void for vagueness.
