= List of first women lawyers and judges in South Carolina =

This is a list of the first women lawyer(s) and judge(s) in South Carolina. It includes the year in which the women were admitted to practice law (in parentheses). Also included are women who achieved other distinctions such becoming the first in their state to graduate from law school or become a political figure.

== Firsts in South Carolina's history ==
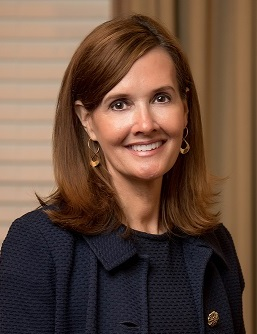
Sherri Lydon: First female U.S. Attorney in South Carolina (2018)

=== Law School ===
- First female law graduate: Claudia J. Sullivan (1918)

=== Lawyers ===
- First female: James M. Perry (1918)
- First African American female: Cassandra E. Maxwell (1938)
- First female to practice in South Carolina's federal courts: Sue Evelyn Lester

=== State judges ===
- First female (magistrate): Louise B. Herbert (1944)
  - Kitty Herbert in 1979
- First female (judge): Judy Bridges in 1983
- First female (Acting; South Carolina Supreme Court): Carol Connor in 1984
- First female (South Carolina Supreme Court): Jean H. Toal in 1988
- First female (South Carolina Circuit Court): Carol Connor in 1988
- First African American female (family court): Abigail Rogers in 1991
- First female (South Carolina Court of Appeals): Carol Connor in 1993
- First female (Chief Justice; South Carolina Supreme Court): Jean H. Toal in 2000

=== Federal judges ===
- First female (federal court): Jean Galloway Bissell in 1984
- First female (United States Court of Appeals for the Fourth Circuit): Karen J. Williams (1980) in 1992
- First African American female (U.S. District Court for the District of South Carolina): Margaret B. Seymour (1977) in 1998
- First African American female from South Carolina (United States Court of Appeals for the Fourth Circuit): DeAndrea G. Benjamin in 2023

=== Deputy Attorney General ===
- First female: Karen L. Henderson

=== United States Attorney ===
- First female: Sherri Lydon in 2018

=== South Carolina Bar Association ===
- First female president: Elaine Fowler in 1993
- First African American female president: Shaheena Bennett in 2024

== Firsts in local history ==
- Courtney Clyburn-Pope: First female (and African American) to serve as a resident judge (Second Judicial Circuit) in Aiken County, South Carolina (2019)
- Grace White (1937): First female lawyer in Beaufort, South Carolina [Beaufort County, South Carolina]
- Mabel Lee Parrott Shuler: First female (non-attorney) magistrate in Berkeley County, South Carolina (1984)
- Clyde Best Sandifer: First female (non-attorney) magistrate in Bamberg County, South Carolina (1960)
- Hannah R. Axelman (1931): First female lawyer in Charleston County, South Carolina
- Ruth Cupp: First female lawyer admitted to the Charleston County Bar Association
- Margie Elizabeth Fuller Cannon: First female magistrate in Charleston County, South Carolina (1968)
- Cheryl Aaron: First female lawyer in Cherokee County, South Carolina
- Barbara Usher Griffin: First female magistrate judge for Chester County, South Carolina
- Nettie B. Cusack: First African American Female Probate Judge in Dorchester County (2005-2011)
- Carolyn Smith Knight: First female magistrate in Florence County, South Carolina
- Nancy Isabelle Richardson Shelley: First female magistrate in Horry County, South Carolina
- Foye Covington: First female magistrate in Orangeburg County, South Carolina (1999)
- Jasmine Twitty: First female (and African American female) to become the youngest judge appointed in Easley, South Carolina (Pickens County, South Carolina; 2015)
- Karen Sanchez Roper: First female resident judge in Pickens County, South Carolina (2016)

== See also ==
- List of first women lawyers and judges in South Dakota
- List of first women lawyers and judges in the United States
- Timeline of women lawyers in the United States
- Women in law

== Other topics of interest ==
- List of first minority male lawyers and judges in the United States
- List of first minority male lawyers and judges in South Carolina
