= Justice Haskell =

Justice Haskell may refer to:

- Alexander Cheves Haskell (1839–1910), associate justice of the South Carolina Supreme Court
- Thomas H. Haskell (1842–1900), associate justice of the Maine Supreme Judicial Court
