= Jacquelyn D. Austin =

American judge (born 1966)

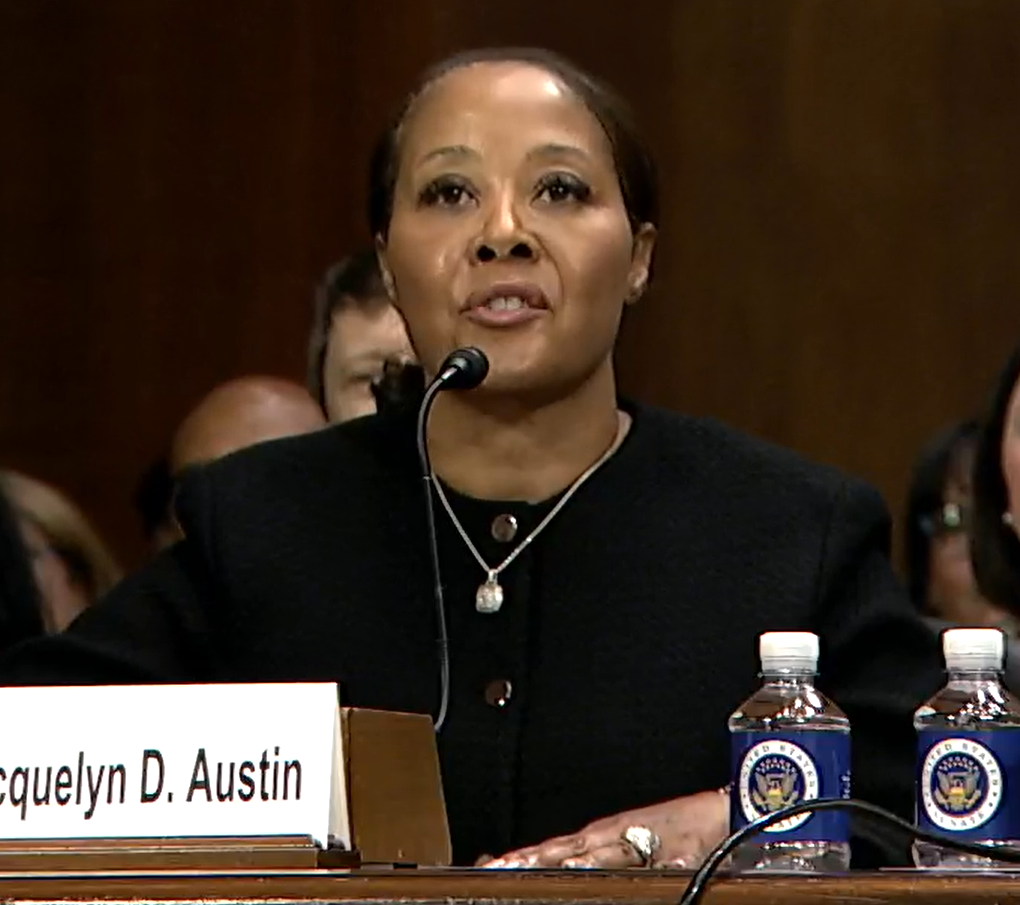

Judge of the United States District Court for the District of South Carolina
- Incumbent
- Assumed office January 29, 2024
- Appointed by: Joe Biden
- Preceded by: J. Michelle Childs

Magistrate Judge of the United States District Court for the District of South Carolina
- In office February 7, 2011 – January 29, 2024

Personal details
- Born: Jacquelyn Denise Graham; 1966 (age 59–60) Sumter, South Carolina, U.S.
- Education: University of South Carolina (BS, JD)

Jacquelyn Denise Austin (née Graham; born 1966) is an American lawyer who has served as a United States district judge of the United States District Court for the District of South Carolina since 2024. She previously served as a United States magistrate judge of the same court from 2011 to 2024.

== Education ==
Austin received a Bachelor of Science from the University of South Carolina School of Engineering in 1989 and a Juris Doctor from the University of South Carolina School of Law in 1996.

== Career ==
After graduating law school, she served as a law clerk for Judge Matthew J. Perry of the United States District Court for the District of South Carolina from 1996 to 1997. From 1997 to 1999, she was as an associate at Hardaway Law Firm. From 1999 to 2006, she was an associate with Womble Carlyle Sandridge and Rice, PLLC and served as a partner from 2006 to 2011. She was appointed as a United States magistrate judge of the United States District Court for the District of South Carolina on February 7, 2011.

=== Notable rulings ===
- Austin denied requests to reduce bond for Dustan Lawson. He was accused of supplying firearms to serial killer Todd Kohlhepp.
- In 2019, Austin ruled in a civil case that there was reasonable video evidence that a Greenville County Sheriff’s deputy slammed a police car door into a handcuffed man’s head, allowing the case to continue. A jury previously sided for the deputy.

=== Federal judicial service ===
On November 1, 2023, President Joe Biden announced his intent to nominate Austin to serve as a United States district judge of the United States District Court for the District of South Carolina. On November 6, 2023, her nomination was sent to the Senate. President Biden nominated Austin to the seat vacated by Judge J. Michelle Childs, who was elevated to the United States Court of Appeals for the District of Columbia Circuit on August 2, 2022. On November 29, 2023, a hearing on her nomination was held before the Senate Judiciary Committee. On January 18, 2024, her nomination was reported out of committee by a 19–2 vote. On January 24, 2024, the United States Senate invoked cloture on her nomination by a 79–17 vote. Later that day, her nomination was confirmed by an 80–17 vote. She received her judicial commission on January 29, 2024.

== See also ==
- List of African American federal judges
- List of African American jurists

Legal offices
Preceded by J. Michelle Childs	Judge of the United States District Court for the District of South Carolina; 2024–present	Incumbent
