= John Cannon Few =

American judge (born 1963)

John Few
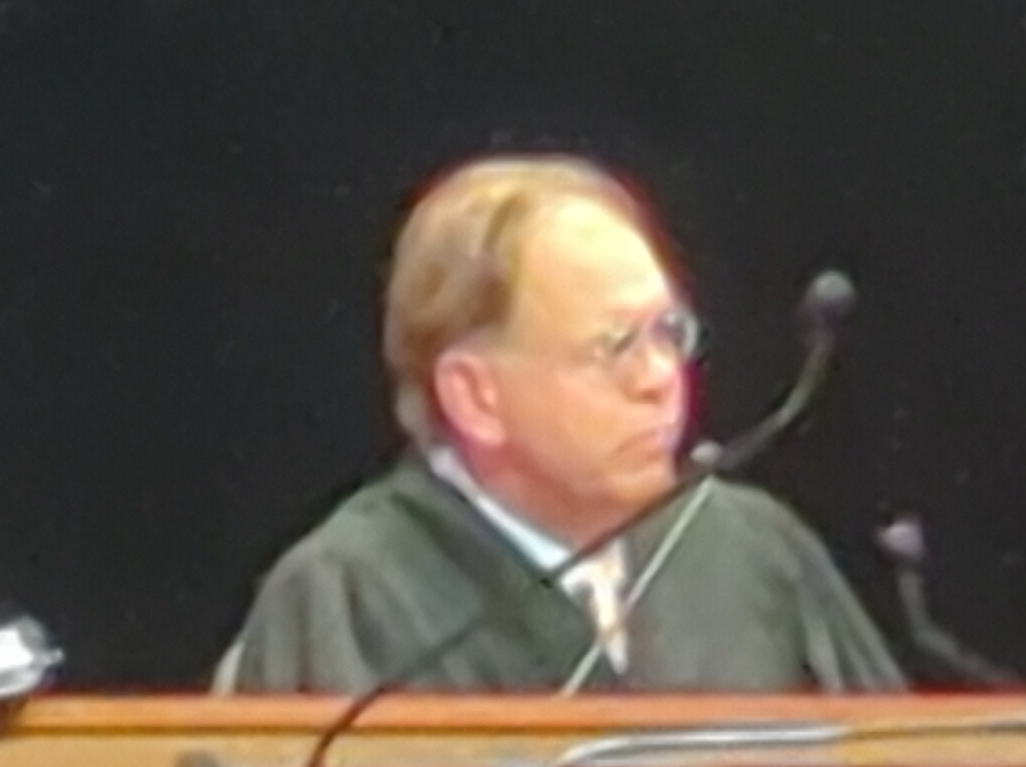

Justice of the South Carolina Supreme Court
- In office January 1, 2016 – July 31, 2026
- Preceded by: Jean H. Toal
- Succeeded by: Vacant

Personal details
- Born: John Cannon Few; April 9, 1963 (age 63) Anderson, South Carolina, U.S.
- Education: Duke University (BA); University of South Carolina (JD)

John Cannon Few (born April 9, 1963) is a former justice of the South Carolina Supreme Court

== Early life and education ==
=== Education ===
Few is a graduate of Duke University, where he served as the athletic mascot, and the University of South Carolina School of Law, where he was a member of The Order of Wig and Robe and The Order of the Coif. He also served as Student Works Editor of the South Carolina Law Review.

=== Legal career ===
Few began his legal career as law clerk to G. Ross Anderson, United States District Judge. He then went on to private practice, which he left in 2000 to serve as a trial judge on the Circuit Court of South Carolina. Few became Chief Judge of the South Carolina Court of Appeals in 2010, departing that position to join the South Carolina Supreme Court in 2016.

=== 2016 South Carolina Supreme Court election ===
Few was elected to the South Carolina Supreme Court on February 3, 2016, and sworn in on February 9, 2016, to fill the position vacated by Jean H. Toal who retired.

=== 2026 South Carolina Supreme Court election ===
At the end of his ten year term, Few ran for re-election to the South Carolina Supreme Court, and faces three challengers: former South Carolina House Speaker Jay Lucas, Chief Administrative Law Judge Ralph Anderson and Appeals Court Judge Blake Hewitt. He later ended his candidacy and retired from the court upon the expiration of his term on July 31, 2026.

== Sources ==
- Justice John C. Few - South Carolina SUPREME COURT
- Chief Judge John C. Few South Carolina COURT OF APPEALS

Legal offices
Preceded by Jean H. Toal	Justice of the South Carolina Supreme Court; 2016–2026	Vacant
