= John P. Gardner =

American judge (1922–1994)

Justice of the South Carolina Court of Appeals
- In office 1980–1993
- Preceded by: Newly created seat
- Succeeded by: Carol Connor

Member of the South Carolina House of Representatives
- In office 1959–1966

Personal details
- Born: 1922 Darlington, South Carolina, U.S.
- Died: August 20, 1994 (aged 71–72)
- Education: University of South Carolina (LLB)
- Occupation: Judge

Military service
- Allegiance: United States
- Branch/service: United States Air Force
- Years of service: 1943–1945
- Battles/wars: World War II

John P. Gardner (1922 – August 20, 1994) was a judge of a special South Carolina Court of Appeals created to alleviate the burden of cases from the South Carolina Supreme Court from 1980 to 1993.

Born in Darlington, South Carolina, Gardner attended Wofford College and served in the United States Air Force during World War II, from 1943 to 1945, before receiving an LL.B. from the University of South Carolina in 1948. He served in the South Carolina House of Representatives from 1959 to 1966.

Due to a backlog in appellate cases in the state, the legislature established a court to handle the excess, with appellate jurisdiction over criminal and family court cases:

The Court was to consist of a Chief Judge and four associate judges. It was to begin operation on July 1, 1980. The General Assembly elected five judges to sit on the Court: John A. Martin, Robert C. Lake Jr., Theo Walker Mitchell, John P. (Jack) Gardner Sr., and Thomas L. Hughston Jr. However, these men never sat as a judicial body to hear an appeal.

Because a state statute "prohibited a legislator from holding a position created by the Legislature in which he sat", the state Supreme Court had to determine that "Gardner, one of the five judges-elect, was eligible to serve because he was not a legislator at the time of his election". As further explained:

In 1983, the Legislature amended the 1979 Act to create a six-judge Court of Appeals. The Court would exist under statutory authority until June 30, 1985. Unless the Court received voter sanction as a constitutional tribunal before that date, it would self-destruct. The Court's jurisdiction was expanded to hear all cases except death penalty cases, public utility cases, significant constitutional issues, public bond issues, and cases related to elections. Five additional judges were elected to join Judge Gardner on the Court: Judges Alexander M. Sanders, Curtis G. Shaw, Randall T. Bell, Jasper M. Cureton, and C. Tolbert Goolsby.

Gardner retired from the court in 1993, and was succeeded by Judge Carol Connor. One of Gardner's law clerks was Trey Gowdy, who would later become a member of the United States House of Representatives.

Political offices
Preceded by Newly created seat	Justice of the South Carolina Court of Appeals; 1980–1993	Succeeded by Carol Connor
