= Henry Maxwell =

Henry Maxwell may refer to:

- Henry Maxwell (1669–1730), Anglo-Irish politician and political writer
- Henry Maxwell, 6th Baron Farnham (1774–1838), Irish peer and Church of Ireland clergyman
- Henry Maxwell, 7th Baron Farnham (1799–1868), Irish peer and member of parliament
- Henry Maxwell (bishop) (1723–1798), Anglican bishop in Ireland
- W. Henry Maxwell (1935–2010), American politician and Baptist minister from Virginia
- Harry Harrison (writer) (Henry Maxwell Dempsey, 1925–2012), American science fiction author
- Henry Maxwell (rugby league) (c. 1932–2013), New Zealand rugby league player
- Henry J. Maxwell (1837–1906), South Carolina state senator, lawyer and Union soldier
- Rev. Henry Maxwell, principal character in the 1896 novel In His Steps by Charles Sheldon
