= Nikky Finney =

American poet (born 1957)

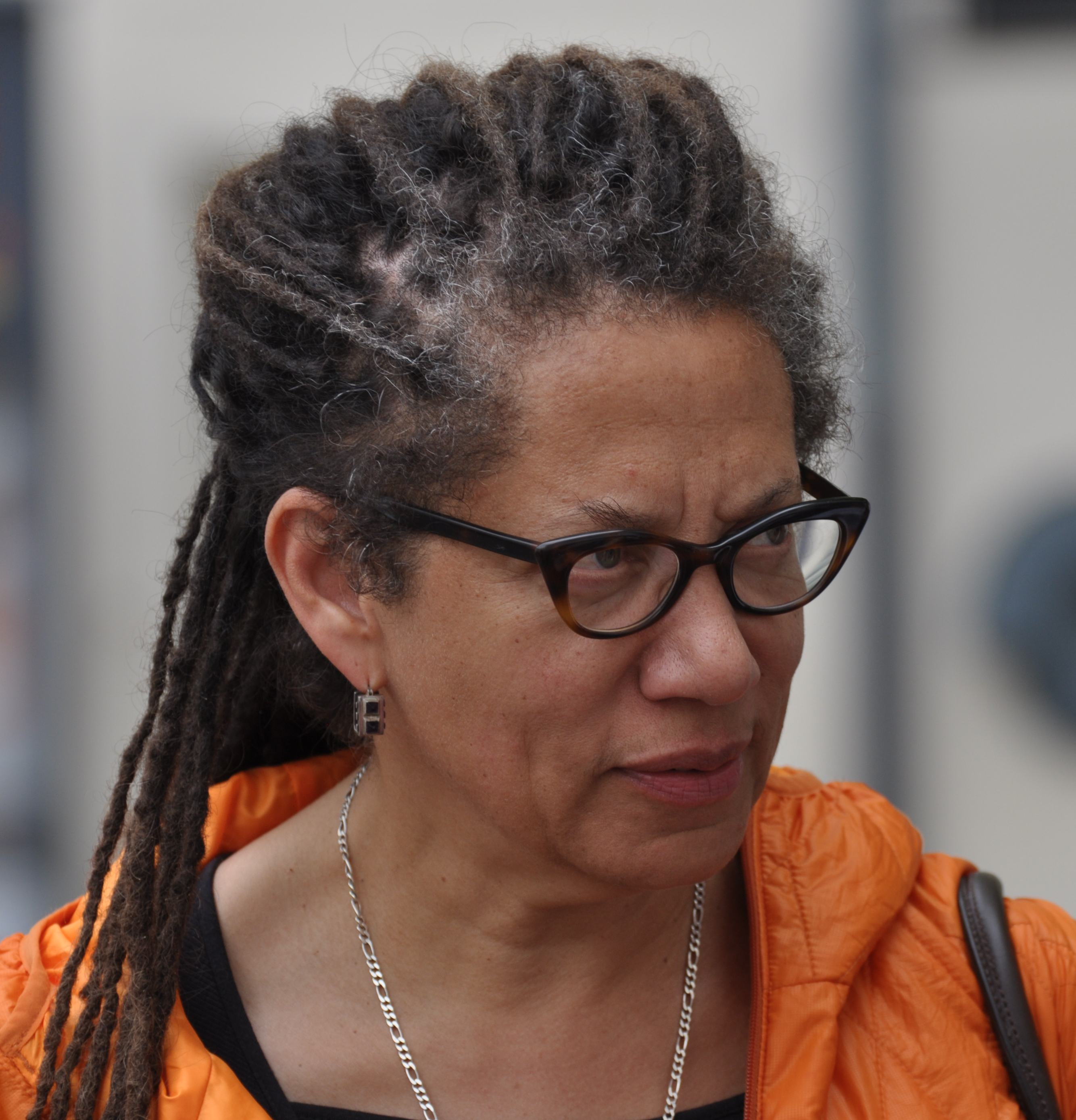
- Finney in 2012
- Born: Lynn Carol Finney; August 26, 1957 (age 69); Conway, South Carolina, U.S.
- Education: Talladega College; Atlanta University
- Occupations: Poet and academic
- Parent(s): Ernest A. Finney, Jr. and Frances Davenport Finney
- Writing career
- Notable awards: PEN Open Book Award; National Book Award for Poetry
- Website: www.nikkyfinney.net

Nikky Finney (born Lynn Carol Finney on August 26, 1957) is an American poet. She was the Guy Davenport Endowed Professor of English at the University of Kentucky for twenty years. In 2013, she accepted a position at the University of South Carolina as the John H. Bennett, Jr. Chair in Southern Letters and Literature. An alumna of Talladega College, and author of four books of poetry and a short-story cycle, Finney is an advocate for social justice and cultural preservation. Her honors include the 2011 National Book Award for her collection Head Off & Split. Finney is a member of The Wintergreen Women Writers Collective.

== Biography ==
Finney was born in Conway, South Carolina, the third child and only daughter of Ernest A. Finney, Jr., civil rights attorney and retired Chief Justice of the state of South Carolina, and Frances Davenport Finney, elementary school teacher. Finney's father began his career as a civil rights attorney, and in 1961, served as Head Legal Counsel for the Friendship 9, black junior college students arrested and charged when trying to desegregate McCrory's lunch counter in Rock Hill, South Carolina. In 1994, Ernest Finney, Jr., was appointed by the State Legislature as the first African-American Chief Justice of South Carolina since Reconstruction. Both of Finney's brothers are attorneys in South Carolina: her older brother, Ernest "Chip" Finney, III, elected Solicitor of the Third Judicial Circuit, and her younger brother, Jerry Leo Finney, in private practice in Columbia, SC.

Both Finney's parents were raised on the family-owned land: Justice Finney on a farm in Virginia, and Frances Davenport Finney on a farm in Newberry, SC. Themes of the African-American relationship to the land surface throughout Finney's work.

Educated first in Catholic grade school, and then in South Carolina public schools during the riotous struggle over integration, Finney was anchored in her youth by her maternal grandmother Beulah Lenorah Butler Davenport and by the inimitable constancy of the nearby South Carolina sea. A bookworm in childhood, she composed poetry and acquired the nickname "Nikky", likely in reference to poet Nikki Giovanni, who would later become a friend and mentor. Graduated from Sumter High School in 1975, Finney matriculated at Talladega College, an HBCU in Alabama, where she was mentored by poet and essayist Dr Gloria Wade-Gayles.

After studying with Dr. Howard Zehr and graduating from Talladega College in 1979, Finney began her artistic career as a photographer. Finney committed to documenting the trajectory of African-American contributions to American creativity and culture. In Alabama, Finney continued to advance as an autodidactic poet and creative artist.

Finney matriculated at Atlanta University, working in the African-American Studies department, under African-American historians Dr. Richard Long and Dr. David Dorsey. While in Atlanta, Finney joined the Pamoja Writing Collective, the community writing workshop led by Toni Cade Bambara. Finney also immersed herself in study of the poetry and visual arts of the Black Arts Movement. Ultimately, limited potential for creative work in academic programs caused Finney to abandon the constraints of graduate study and return to Talladega to work as a photographer. Hired as photographer and reporter by Byllye Y. Avery, for the newly organized, Atlanta-based National Black Women's Health Project, Finney traveled to Nairobi, Kenya, for the End of the Decade of Women Conference in 1985, and covered the historic UN conference for the National Black Women's Health Project.

== Career ==
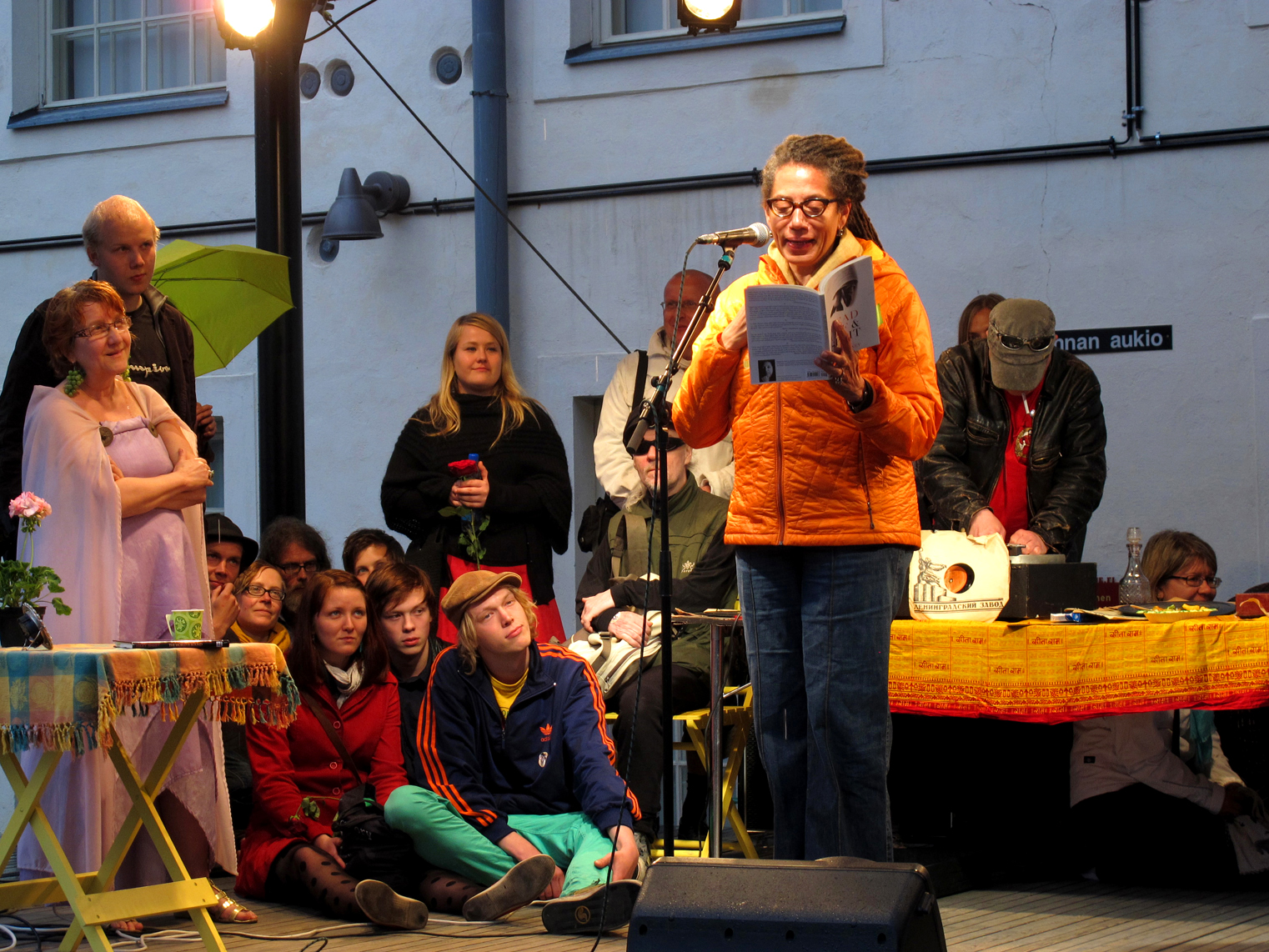
Finney reading at Annikki Poetry Festival in Tampere, Finland, on June 9, 2012

Finney's targeted result of her independent years was achieved: On Wings Made of Gauze, her first book of poems, was completed in Atlanta. The book was read and ushered to the late Eunice Riedel by Nikki Giovanni. Riedel acquired and edited On Wings Made of Gauze, which was published by William Morrow, in 1985.

After publication of her first book of poems, Finney relocated to the Bay Area, where she involved herself with progressive causes, and continued independent work as a poet. She was recruited to a position as Visiting Writer in the English department at the University of Kentucky (1989–90), by South Carolina-born novelist and poet Percival Everett. In 1993, Finney was offered a post on the permanent faculty. Her second book of poetry, Rice, was completed in Lexington, Kentucky, and was published in 1995 by SisterVisions, a Canadian press. In 1997, Rice received a PEN Open Book Award. Rice stands as the book that brought Finney her many grassroots followers. Her story cycle Heartwood, designed for literacy students, was published in 1998, by the University Press of Kentucky.

Finney took a leave from the University of Kentucky in 1999 to hold the Goode Chair in the Humanities at Berea College (founded in 1855), the first interracial and coeducational college in the South. After returning to the English Department at the University of Kentucky, Finney's third book of poetry, The World is Round, was published by Inner Light Publishing in 2003. In 2005, she became Full Professor in the English Department at the University of Kentucky. In 2006, she was appointed Interim Director of the African American Studies and Research Program at the University of Kentucky. After the publication of The World is Round, Finney was invited to Smith College, in Northampton, Massachusetts, where she served for two years as the Grace Hazard Conkling Writer-in-Residence, from 2007 to 2009.

Finney edited and wrote the introduction to The Ringing Ear: Black Poets Lean South, which was published by the University of Georgia Press in 2007, under the auspices of Cave Canem, an organization that works to increase opportunities for African-American poets. The Ringing Ear, with entries selected and edited by Finney, showcased the work of one hundred African-American poets who are southern or who wrote on southern subjects.

Finney's fourth book of poems, Head Off & Split, was published by Northwestern University Press in 2011. On October 12, 2011, Head Off & Split was announced as a finalist for the 2011 National Book Awards, with Finney honored as the 2011 winner of the National Book Award for Poetry on November 16, 2011. Her acceptance speech at the awards ceremony, touching on race, reading and writing, was judged by host John Lithgow as "the best acceptance speech for anything that I've ever heard in my life".

Finney (second from the left) with Governor Nikki Haley (fourth from the right) and 2016 South Carolina Arts Award winners.

Head Off & Split was selected as the 2015–16 First Year Book by the University of Maryland, College Park. This work provides an opportunity for students and faculty to delve into complex topics using a common text. Finney was also commissioned to write a new poem entitled "The Battle of and for the Black Face Boy" to be presented to the campus community in October 2015. She is a contributor to the 2019 anthology New Daughters of Africa, edited by Margaret Busby.

Finney is a founding member of the Affrilachian Poets, a writing collective based in Lexington, Kentucky. She has served on the faculty and Board of the Cave Canem Foundation, where she shepherds younger poets in the spirit of her mentorship experience.

== Awards and honors ==
- 1999: Kentucky Arts Council, Al Smith Fellowship
- 1999: PEN/Beyond Margins Award, Rice, New York City
- 2002: Hall of Fame for Writers of African Descent, Chicago, Illinois
- 2002: Honorary Doctorate of Humanities, Claflin University
- 2004: Benjamin Franklin Awards (Independent Booksellers Association), First Place for Poetry, The World Is Round
- 2011: National Book Award for Poetry, Head Off & Split
- 2013: Induction into the South Carolina Academy of Authors

== Works ==
- On Wings Made of Gauze, W. Morrow, 1985, ISBN 978-0-688-04796-2
- Rice, Sister Vision, 1995, ISBN 978-0-920813-21-8
- Heartwood. University Press of Kentucky. 1997. ISBN 978-0-8131-0910-7.
- The World is Round, InnerLight Pub., 2003, ISBN 978-0-9714890-4-2
- Head Off & Split: Poems, Northwestern University Press, 2011, ISBN 978-0-8101-5216-8
- Lovechild’s Hot Bed of Occasional Poetry: Poems and Artifacts, Northwestern University Press, 2020, ISBN 978-0-8101-4201-5

=== As editor ===
- The Ringing Ear: Black Poets Lean South. University of Georgia Press. 2007. ISBN 978-0-8203-2926-0.
