= Cassandra E. Maxwell =

American lawyer

Cassandra E. Maxwell (?– 1974; later Cassandra Maxwell Birnie) was an American lawyer. She was South Carolina's first African American female lawyer.

== Biography ==
She was born in Orangeburg, South Carolina. Her grandfather was Henry J. Maxwell and her father John Moreau Maxwell, a successful grocer, and he intended for his children to carry on the family business. Instead, Maxwell attended Spelman College before completing her law degree at the Howard University School of Law in 1938. She passed the bar examination shortly thereafter in 1939, and Maxwell became the first African American female to practice law in South Carolina.

In 1941, she also became a faculty member of South Carolina State University’School of Law. By 1951, Maxwell relocated to Atlanta, Georgia and set up a law practice. She became involved with the Civil Rights Movement and assisted future Supreme Court Justice Thurgood Marshall with any pertinent NAACP cases. She remained active with matters concerning the NAACP Legal Defense and Educational Fund and other organizations when she relocated to Philadelphia, Pennsylvania. She died in Philadelphia in 1974.

== See also ==
- List of first women lawyers and judges in South Carolina
