= Jeremiah A. Brown =

American politician

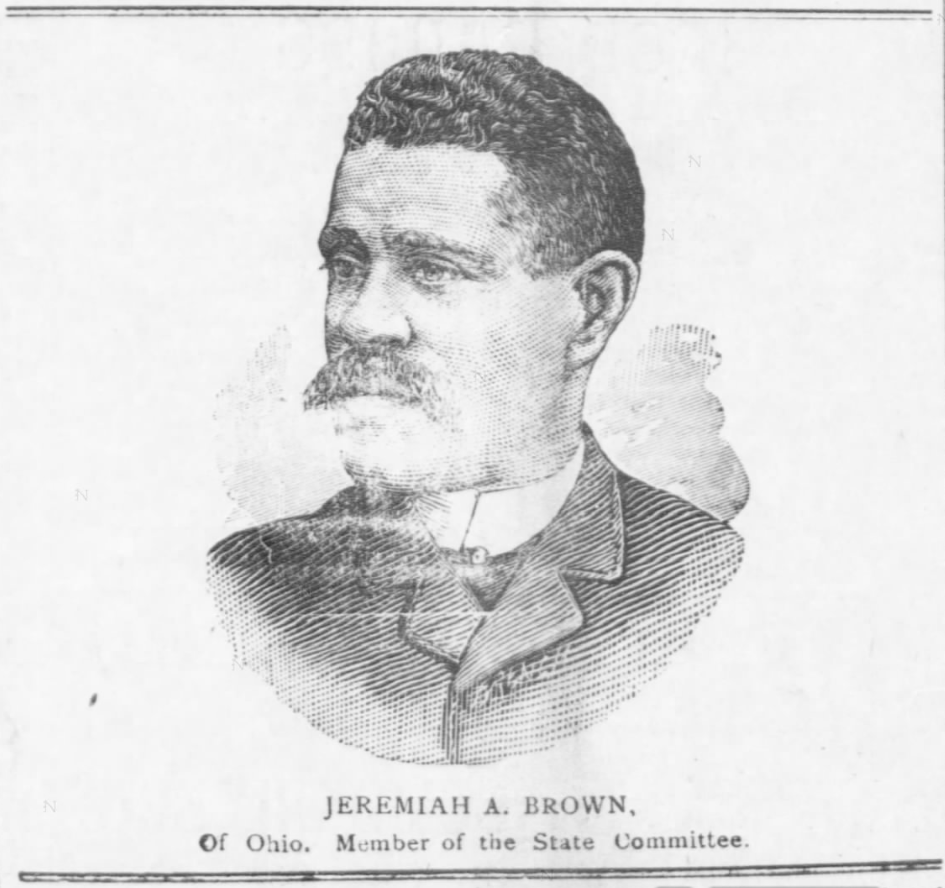
- Sketch of Brown from newspaper, 1901.
- Born: November 14, 1841; Pittsburgh, Pennsylvania
- Died: March 28, 1913 (aged 71); Cleveland, Ohio
- Occupations: politician, civil rights activist, carpenter and joiner
- Political party: Republican

Jeremiah A. Brown (November 14, 1841 – March 28, 1913) was an American politician and civil rights activist in the American city of Cleveland, Ohio. Early in his life, Brown worked on steamboats with Mark Twain. He later moved to Cleveland, where he was elected to the Ohio House of Representatives in 1885 where together with Benjamin W. Arnett, he played an important role in fighting black laws, supporting education, and working for the civil rights of Ohio's African Americans. He also held numerous state and national political appointments.

Brown was the first African-American to receive a political appointment in Cuyahoga County, the first to serve as a deputy sheriff in Ohio, and the second to be elected to the Ohio state legislature.

== Biography ==
=== Early life ===
Jeremiah A. Brown, known as "Jere", was born November 14, 1841, in Pittsburgh, Pennsylvania. He was the oldest child of six children of Thomas A. and Frances J. Brown. His sister, Hallie Quinn Brown, was a noted educator and civil rights activist. He attended school in Pittsburgh until age thirteen. His classmates included Rev. Benjamin Tucker Tanner, Thomas Morris Chester, and James T. Bradford. He then joined his father as a steamboatman along the Ohio and Mississippi rivers. As a steamboatman, Brown claimed friendship with Mark Twain, and was said to be a survivor of the famous 1858 explosion of the steamboat Pennsylvania.

About the age of seventeen he apprenticed himself to James H. McClelland to work as a carpenter and joiner. Many other employees of McClelland quit when Brown joined the shop, unwilling to work with a black person. He also attended Avery College in Allegheny, Pennsylvania, for a short time. After his apprenticeship, Brown's parents moved the family to Chatham, Ontario, to be away from discrimination. When the US Civil War began, Brown moved to St. Louis, Missouri, to work on steamboats. On January 17, 1864, he married Mary A. Wheeler, sister of Chicago lawyer Lloyd G. Wheeler and Harford minister Robert F. Wheeler. Brown's wife died in the late summer of 1904. Brown later remarried and he had two children.

=== Political career ===
In 1869 or 1870, Brown and his family moved to Cleveland where he began his political career. His first position was as bailiff of the county probate court, followed by deputy sheriff and county prison turnkey. He then became clerk of the City Boards of Equalization and Revision, and finally letter-carrier for the post office in August 1881, a position he held until being elected in 1885. He was also involved with black social movements, taking part in numerous state and national conventions of colored people at least as early as 1884.

In 1885 he was elected to the Ohio State House of Representatives. His district was estimated as being one-tenth black. He frequently worked with another African-American legislator elected that same year, Benjamin W. Arnett. Arnett's district was one-twentieth black. He was very active in the legislature, particularly in working to end the Black Laws in Ohio. He was especially known for passing an anti-discriminating insurance bill. In 1901, Brown became a member of the Ohio State Republican Party executive committee.

He was active in republican politics and supported prominent Ohio Republicans including John Sherman and Mark Hanna, for which he was rewarded with public positions after serving in the legislature. In 1899 he went to Washington, D.C., to get appointment to federal civil service positions and in 1890 he was made United States Customs Inspector at Cleveland. Brown was appointed clerk in the Internal Revenue Bureau in Cleveland. In 1902, he was put in charge of the office of immigrant inspector in Cleveland. He held a number of other appointments including deputy in the state insurance commissioner's office.

Brown was also a member of the Carpenters' and Joiners' Union of Cleveland. He noted in an 1886 letter to the black newspaper, the New York Freeman, that he opposed segregated labor unions. Brown was a prominent Mason in Ohio and was a Grand Master of Prince Hall Masonry. He also served as Trustee of Wilberforce University. Later in life he was active in promoting education and religion. He was a member of the Congressional club of Cleveland. Brown was raised in the African Methodist Episcopal church and was a member of the Mt. Zion Congregational Church, in the denomination United Church of Christ at his death.

=== Death and legacy ===
Brown died on March 28, 1913, aged 71.

== See also ==
- African American officeholders from the end of the Civil War until before 1900
