= Benjamin Tucker Tanner =

African Methodist Episcopal minister (1835–1923)

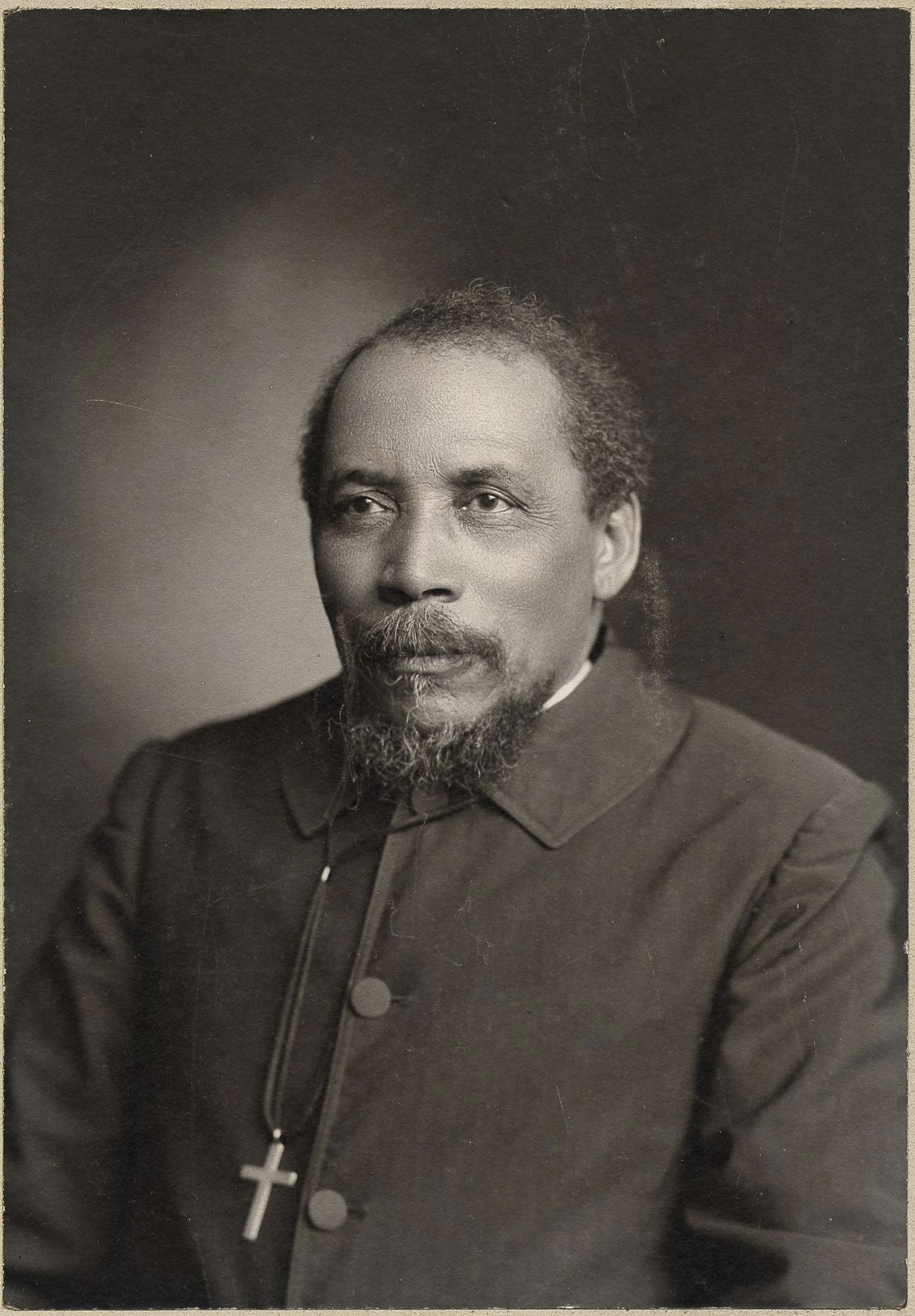
- Benjamin Tucker Tanner, March 30, 1898
- Born: December 25, 1835; Pittsburgh, Pennsylvania, U.S.
- Died: January 14, 1923 (aged 87); Washington, D.C., U.S.
- Education: Avery College, Western Theological Seminary
- Occupations: Clergyman, missionary, newspaper publisher, newspaper editor
- Spouse: Sarah Elizabeth Tanner
- Children: Henry Ossawa Tanner, Halle Tanner Dillon Johnson

Benjamin Tucker Tanner (December 25, 1835 – January 14, 1923) was an American clergyman and editor. He edited The Christian Recorder, an influential African American Methodist newspaper, and later founded The AME Church Review, an academic journal. He also served as a bishop in the African Methodist Episcopal Church.

== Early life and education ==
He was born on December 25, 1835, to Hugh and Isabella Tanner in Pittsburgh, Pennsylvania. He studied for five years at Avery College, paying his expenses by working as a barber. As a student in Pittsburgh, his classmates included Jeremiah A. Brown, Thomas Morris Chester, and James T. Bradford.

He then studied for three years at Western Theological Seminary (now Pittsburgh Theological Seminary).

== Career ==
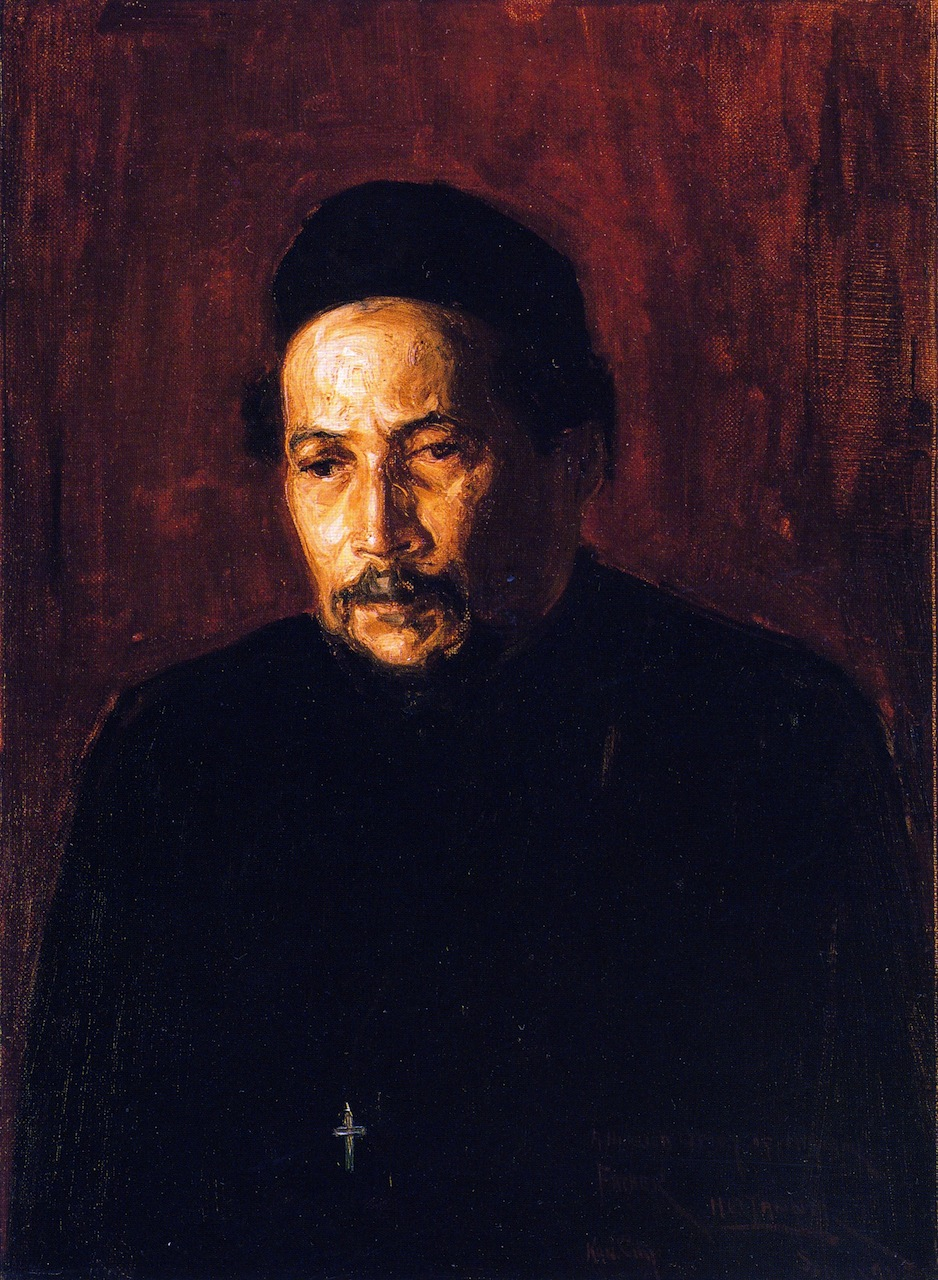
Bishop Benjamin Tucker Tanner, painting by his son Henry Ossawa Tanner, Kansas City, 1897

At twenty five he was appointed to Sacramento by Bishop Daniel A. Payne, but he could not afford to go, so he moved to Washington, D. C. where he organized a Sunday School for freed slaves in the Navy Yard with the permission of Admiral John A. Dahlgren. In 1863 he became pastor of a church in Georgetown. In 1866 he moved to a large church in Baltimore. Shortly later he was appointed principal of the Annual Conference School at Fredericktown, Maryland, and he organized a common school under the auspices of the Freedmen's Bureau. In 1868 he was elected chief secretary of the general conference of the AME church and founded and became editor of the church newspaper, the Christian Recorder, a role he served for 16 years. In 1870 he was given an A. M. degree by Avery College and in the 1870s he was given an honorary D. D. by Wilberforce University. In 1884 he was made editor of the A. M. E. Review, and he was the author of a number of books and pamphlets in the 1870s and 1880s, including: 'Apology for African Methodism;' 'The Negro's Origin; and Is He Cursed of God,' 'An Outline of our History and Government;' 'The Negro, African and American.'

In 1889, Tanner was focused on missionary work in Haiti and William B. Derrick was serving as mission secretary. In August, it was found that the mission treasury was empty. AME leader, Daniel A. Payne demanded of Derrick what had happened to the funds. Derrick had been giving money to the Haitian mission in cash, which was not in itself a cause of trouble, but may have led to misuse of the funds. Tanner was hesitant to settle the dispute, but Derrick improved his place in the view of the AME leaders over the next few years and the pair reconciled.

He was a participant in the March 5, 1897, meeting to celebrate the memory of Frederick Douglass which founded the American Negro Academy led by Alexander Crummell. Until 1905, he was a participating member of this first major African American learned society, which was led by scholars, activist, editors, and bishops like Tanner. It refuted racist scholarship, promoted black claims to individual, social, and political equality, and studied the history and sociology of African American life.

== Personal life and death ==
Tanner was the husband of Sarah Elizabeth Tanner, and was the father of artist Henry Ossawa Tanner and the physician Halle Tanner Dillon Johnson, and the grandfather of Sadie Tanner Mossell Alexander.

Tanner died on January 14, 1923, in Washington, D.C.
