= South Carolina Law Review =

- Discipline: Law
- Language: English

Publication details
- Former name(s): Year Book of the Selden Society, South Carolina Law Quarterly
- History: 1937-present
- Publisher: University of South Carolina School of Law (United States)
- Frequency: Quarterly

Standard abbreviations
- Bluebook: S.C. L. Rev.
- ISO 4: S. C. Law Rev.

Indexing
- ISSN: 0038-3104
- OCLC no.: 1585980

Links
- Journal homepage; Online archive

The South Carolina Law Review is a student-edited law review that was established in 1937. It covers South Carolina law and commentary on the United States Court of Appeals for the Fourth Circuit. It also publishes the winning essays from the Warren E. Burger Writing Competition, which is sponsored by the American Inns of Court Foundation. In 2008 the journal began to experiment with peer review.

== History ==
The journal was originally published as the Year Book of the Selden Society, then as the South Carolina Law Quarterly, before getting its current title.

== Peer review initiatives ==
During the summer of 2008, the South Carolina Law Review began its Peer Review Pilot Program and an effort is being made to expand the peer review concept to other student-edited law journals across the United States, using the "Peer-Reviewed Scholarship Marketplace.

== Surveys ==
The South Carolina Law Review launched an initiative, modeled after Harvard Law Review's Supreme Court Survey, to comment on cases reported from the United States Court of Appeals for the Fourth Circuit, covering Maryland, West Virginia, Virginia, North Carolina, and South Carolina. The first survey, published in Volume 60, Book 5, includes six significant cases from the Fourth Circuit. Another survey, the South Carolina Survey consists of notes and comments on timely topics pertaining to South Carolina law that are written by the second year student-members.

== Warren E. Burger Prize ==
From the American Inns of Court website:

The Warren E. Burger Writing Competition is designed to encourage outstanding scholarship that "promotes the ideals of excellence, civility, ethics and professionalism within the legal profession," the core mission of the American Inns of Court. The American Inns of Court invites judges, lawyers, professors, students, scholars and other authors to participate in the competition by submitting an original, unpublished essay of 10,000 to 25,000 words on a topic of their choice addressing issues of legal excellence, civility, ethics and professionalism.

== Membership selection ==
Every year, the South Carolina Law Review selects its members from a journal competition held immediately after spring exams. The competition is open only to first year law students. Transfer students are given the opportunity to participate in a journal competition during the fall of their second year.

== Notable past members (alphabetically) ==
- Joseph F. Anderson, Senior Judge, United States District Court for the District of South Carolina
- G. Ross Anderson, Jr., Judge, United States District Court for the District of South Carolina
- William S. Duffey Jr., Jr., Judge, United States District Court for the Northern District of Georgia
- John C. Few, Associate Justice, South Carolina Supreme Court
- Ben A. Hagood, Jr., South Carolina State Senator (R-Mt. Pleasant)
- David W. Harwell, Former Chief Justice, South Carolina Supreme Court
- Robert W. Hayes, Jr., South Carolina State Senator (R-Rock Hill)
- Ernest Hollings, Former United States Senator (D-SC)
- James Mann, Former U.S. Representative (D - 4th SC)
- Henry McMaster, South Carolina Governor; landlord/owner PJM Properties
- Ronald Motley, Attorney, Motley Rice
- David C. Norton, Judge, United States District Court for the District of South Carolina
- C. Kenneth Powell, Former Chairman, South Carolina Republican Party
- Dennis Shedd, Judge, United States Court of Appeals for the Fourth Circuit
- Vincent A. Sheheen, South Carolina State Senator (D-Camden) and Gubernatorial Candidate
- Jean H. Toal, Former Chief Justice, South Carolina Supreme Court
- William Byrd Traxler, Jr., Chief Judge, United States Court of Appeals for the Fourth Circuit
- Inez Tenenbaum, Former Chair of the United States Consumer Product Safety Commission in the Obama Administration, Former South Carolina Superintendent of Education and United States Senate Candidate
- William Walter Wilkins, Former Judge, United States Court of Appeals for the Fourth Circuit
- Karen J. Williams, Former Judge, United States Court of Appeals for the Fourth Circuit
