= Benjamin W. Arnett =

American politician

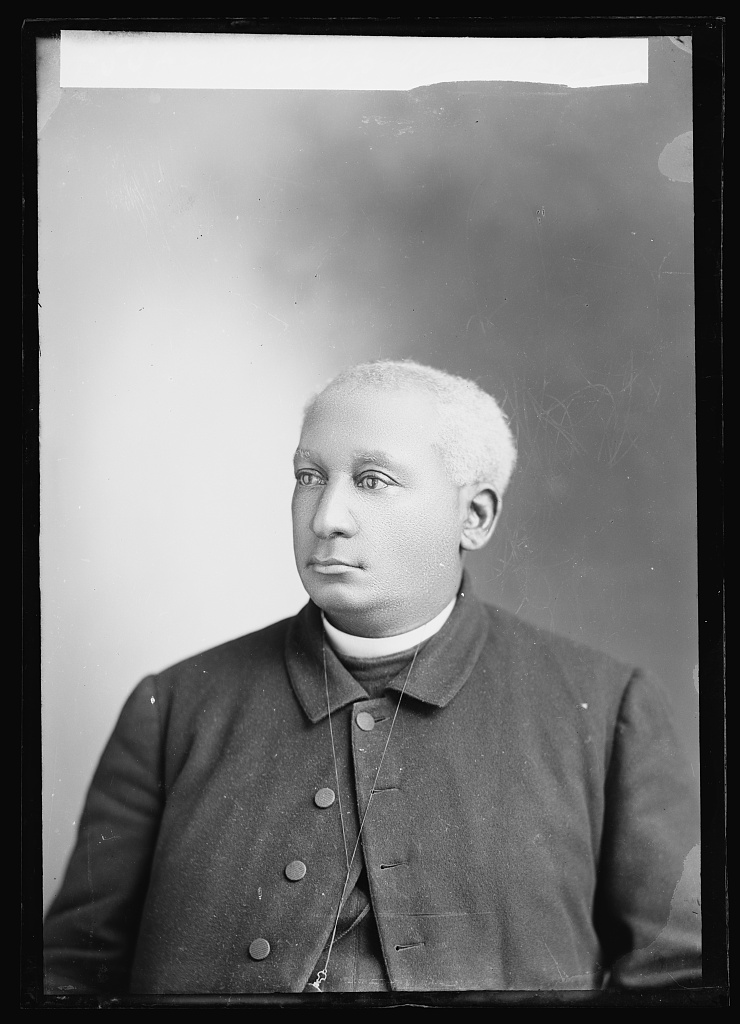
- Born: Benjamin William Arnett; March 6, 1838; Brownsville, Pennsylvania
- Died: October 7, 1906 (aged 68); Wilberforce University Campus, Wilberforce, Ohio
- Occupation(s): Bishop, educator, and politician
- Spouse: Mary Louise Gordon (m. May 25, 1858)

Benjamin William Arnett (March 6, 1838 – October 7, 1906) was an American educator, minister, bishop and member of the Ohio House of Representatives.

== Early life ==
He was born a free black man March 6, 1838 in Brownsville, Pennsylvania, where he taught school from 1859 to 1867. In his youth, Arnett lost a leg to an infection sustained after an ankle injury while working on a steam boat between 1857 and 1858.

Arnett married May 25, 1858 to Mary Louise Gordon from Geneva and Uniontown, Pennsylvania. They had seven children: Alonzo T, Benjamin W, Henry T, Annie L, Alphonso Taft, Flossy Gordon, and Daniel Payne.

== Religious career ==
As a pastor in the African Methodist Episcopal Church (AME), Arnett served parishes in Toledo, Cincinnati, and Columbus; under his leadership, St. Paul's Church in Urbana was completed. It has been designated as a historical landmark. In 1888, he was elected bishop, a position he held until his death in 1906.

He was active in religious education as well, and was a delegate to the International Convention of Sabbath Schools in Washington, DC in 1872 and to the International Sunday School Convention in Toronto in 1880. He had an honorary Doctor of Divinity from Wilberforce University awarded in June 1883.

== Civil career ==
In the 1860s, Arnett was active in the civil rights movement. He was a member of the Pennsylvania State Equal Rights League and in 1864 was a member of the national convention of colored men in Syracuse, New York. He was secretary of the National Convention of Colored Men in Washington, D.C. in 1867 and chaplain of the convention in Louisville, Kentucky, in 1883.

In 1872, Arnett became the first black man to serve as foreman of an otherwise all-white jury. In 1885, he was elected to the Ohio General Assembly from a district with an 85 percent white majority, thus becoming the first African-American to represent a predominantly white constituency. That same year another African-American, Jeremiah A. Brown, was elected from Cleveland, and the two frequently worked together. In 1886, as Republican representative from Greene County in the Ohio General Assembly, Arnett introduced legislation to repeal the state's "Black Laws," which limited the freedom and rights of African-American residents. Arnett was particularly concerned that state law did not ensure that black children had the same educational opportunities as white children. In 1887, statutes regarding education were changed; the state was thereafter required to provide equal opportunities to all children regardless of race. A forceful and compelling speaker, Arnett was influential in Republican politics, thanks, in part, to his friendship with fellow legislator (and later president), William McKinley.

== Death and legacy ==
Arnett died at Wilberforce University on October 7, 1906.

Bishop Arnett's influence is felt in the Pentecostal community. His great-grandson, Right Reverend Benjamin Terwood Douglass of Cleveland, Ohio, is the Seventh Bishop elevated in the Pentecostal Churches of Christ. Bishop Douglass serves as Secretary-General of that Reformation which has its roots in Methodism.
