= Avery College =

Former school in Pittsburgh, Pennsylvania (1849–1873)

Location
- Avery and Nash Streets, Pittsburgh, Pennsylvania, U.S. 40.453664°N 79.998520°W

Information
- Former name: Allegheny Institute and Mission Church (1849–), Avery College Training School
- Type: Private African-American
- Religious affiliations: Methodist, Methodist Protestant, African Methodist Episcopal, Presbyterian
- Established: 1849
- Founder: Rev. Charles Avery
- Closed: 1873

Avery College was a private school for African-American students from 1849 until 1873 in Pittsburgh, Pennsylvania, U.S. It was initially founded as an industrial school and AME church, and later transitioned into a school for classical education. It also contained a lower level used by the Underground Railroad. Avery College was formerly known as the Allegheny Institute and Mission Church, and Avery College Training School.

== History ==
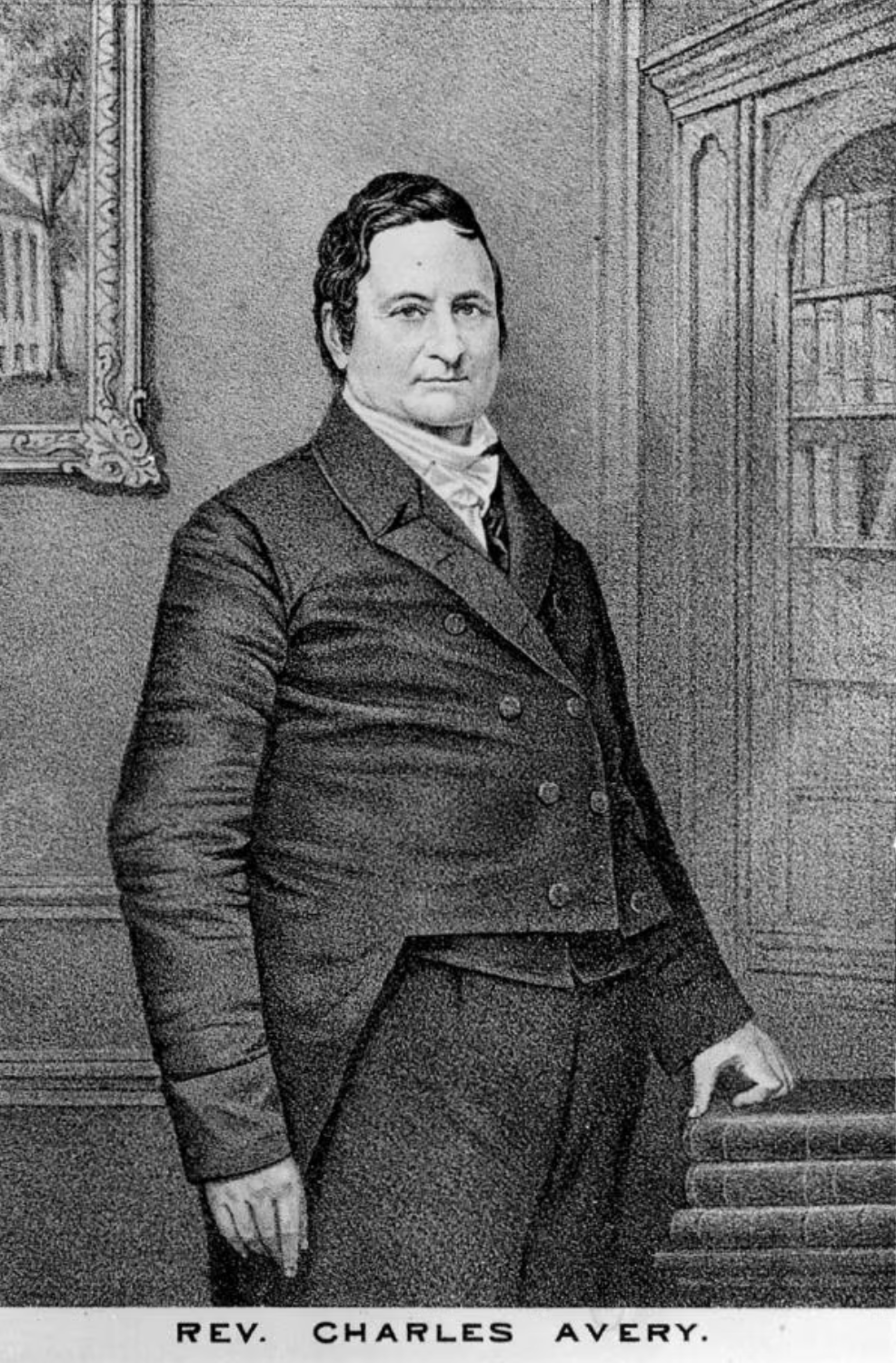
Rev. Charles Avery

Avery College was founded in 1849 by Rev. Charles Avery (1784–1858) from Westchester County, New York of the Methodist Protestant denomination, who was also an abolitionist, cotton merchant, and an industrialist. It was located at Avery and Nash Streets, and founded as the Allegheny Institute and Mission Church. Established as an industrial school and church, it eventually offered a classical education.

When the school was opened it had 125 students, and was led by George Murray, who was also a professor. From 1863 to 1867, George Boyer Vashon served as the president.

Jonathan Jasper Wright received an honorary LL.D degree from Avery College.

== Building ==
The school was a three-story Greek Revival brick building; the first two floors of the building were classrooms, the third floor was a worship space for the African Methodist Episcopal's (many of which were affiliated with the A.M.E. Zion Church in Pittsburgh), and the basement was accessed by a trapdoor and was reported used by members of the Underground Railroad to access a tunnel for escape. The school building was demolished after the closure, when they were building interstate 279 in the 1970s.

== Closure ==
After the school's closure in 1873, there was a proposition to reopen Avery College in 1892 led by Rev. J.A. Boyden from Grace Memorial Presbyterian Church in Pittsburgh. By 1899, tensions grew between the church and the school, drawing newspaper coverage.

In 1968, a historical marker was added to the former school's location by the Pennsylvania Historical and Museum Commission.

== Alumni ==
- Benjamin Tucker Tanner (1835–1923) AME minister, newspaper publisher, and editor
- Jonathan Jasper Wright (1840–1877), judge
