= J. Michelle Childs =

American judge (born 1966)

Michelle Childs
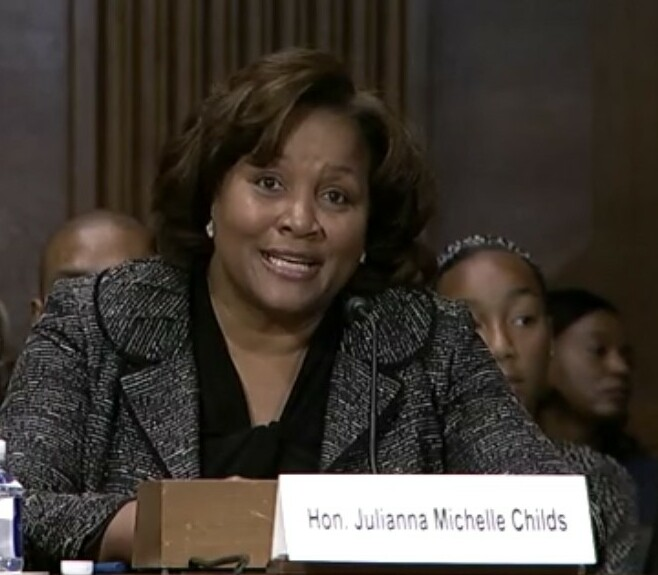

Judge of the United States Court of Appeals for the District of Columbia Circuit
- Incumbent
- Assumed office July 25, 2022
- Appointed by: Joe Biden
- Preceded by: David S. Tatel

Judge of the United States District Court for the District of South Carolina
- In office August 20, 2010 – August 2, 2022
- Appointed by: Barack Obama
- Preceded by: G. Ross Anderson
- Succeeded by: Jacquelyn D. Austin

Judge of the South Carolina Circuit Court for the 5th circuit
- In office 2006–2010
- Preceded by: Reginald I. Lloyd
- Succeeded by: Stephanie McDonald

Personal details
- Born: Julianna Michelle Childs; 1966 (age 59–60) Detroit, Michigan, U.S.
- Education: University of South Florida (BS); University of South Carolina (MA, JD); Duke University (LLM)

Julianna Michelle Childs (born 1966) is an American lawyer and jurist serving as a United States circuit judge of the United States Court of Appeals for the District of Columbia Circuit. She was previously a United States district judge of the United States District Court for the District of South Carolina from 2010 to 2022 and a judge of the South Carolina Circuit Court from 2006 to 2010.

Childs was under consideration by President Joe Biden to fill retiring Justice Stephen Breyer's seat on the Supreme Court of the United States, but Biden instead nominated Ketanji Brown Jackson for Breyer's seat in February 2022.

== Early life and education ==
Childs was born in 1966 in Detroit, Michigan. Her parents divorced when she was young. Her father, Ralph "Pete" Childs, was a champion ping pong player who won the U.S. Junior Championship in 1964 at age 16; he joined the Detroit Police Department as an officer in 1970. Her mother, Shandra (née Green), a personnel manager for Michigan Bell Telephone, decided to move to Columbia, South Carolina, when Childs was 14 years old due to rising crime in Detroit. Childs' father remained in Detroit and died in 1980 at age 32 from a gunshot wound, possibly self-inflicted. She attended Columbia High School, where she graduated in 1984 as class president and valedictorian. She also took part in youth beauty pageants and won the Miss Black Florida pageant in 1986.

Childs was inspired to pursue a legal career after participating in mock trial programs, first in high school and later at the University of South Florida, which she attended on scholarship. She is a member of Delta Sigma Theta sorority. She graduated cum laude in 1988 with a Bachelor of Arts degree in management from the University of South Florida. She enrolled at the University of South Carolina School of Law, wanting to practice law in her home state, and graduated in 1991 with a Juris Doctor. Childs also earned a Master of Arts degree in personnel and employment relations from the University of South Carolina School of Business in 1991. In 2016, she received her Master of Laws in judicial studies from Duke University School of Law.

== Early career ==
In 1991, Childs was hired as a law clerk at Nexsen Pruet, a firm that represents employers in labor law litigation. She was a full associate at the firm from 1992 to 1999, and became the first Black woman partner at a major South Carolina law firm when she was named a Nexsen Pruet partner in 2000. During her time at the firm, Childs gained a reputation for being an expert in employment and labor law.

After working for Nexsen Pruet, Childs worked in the state government for six years. From 2000 to 2002, Childs served as the deputy director of the division of labor with the South Carolina Department of Labor during the administration of South Carolina Governor Jim Hodges. From 2002 until 2006, she served as a commissioner on the South Carolina Workers' Compensation Commission.

== Judicial career ==
=== State court ===
In 2006, she was elected by the South Carolina General Assembly to become Richland County Circuit Court Judge based in Columbia. During her time as a state judge, she helmed a special business court pilot program and became chief judge for General Sessions, South Carolina's Criminal Court.

Childs has received criticism from the magazine The American Prospect for sentencing a non-violent man to prison for 12 years for selling eight ounces of marijuana in a 2009 case, while Childs was a circuit court judge.

=== Federal judicial service ===
==== District court service ====
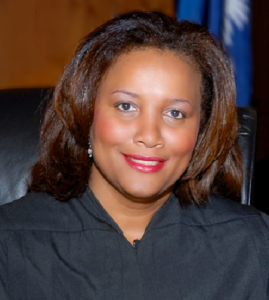
US District Court Judge J. Michelle Childs

On December 22, 2009, President Barack Obama nominated Childs to serve on the United States District Court for the District of South Carolina, to fill the seat vacated by Judge G. Ross Anderson, who assumed senior status on January 29, 2009. On April 16, 2010, a hearing on her nomination was held before the Senate Judiciary Committee. On May 6, 2010, her nomination was favorably reported by the committee. Her nomination was confirmed by the United States Senate on August 5, 2010. She received her commission on August 20, 2010. Her service on the district court terminated on August 2, 2022, when she was elevated to the Court of Appeals.

Childs was elected to the American Law Institute in 2011 and served as an adviser on the Restatement Third, Employment Law, an influential legal treatise that was published in 2015. She also served on an ALI Regional Advisory Group, helping to identify and recommend new members in North Carolina, South Carolina, and Tennessee. In 2020, Childs was elected chair of the judicial division of the American Bar Association. In February 2021, Childs was promoted as a potential Supreme Court nominee under the Biden administration by United States Representative Jim Clyburn of South Carolina.

==== Notable cases ====
In November 2014, Childs ruled in favor of two women who sued to have the state recognize their marriage performed in Washington, D.C., finding South Carolina's failure to recognize their marriage to be unconstitutional.

In September 2020, Childs granted a preliminary injunction that blocked South Carolina's absentee ballot witness requirement. A United States Court of Appeals for the Fourth Circuit panel initially blocked the injunction granted by Childs, but the full appeals court reinstated it during an en banc session. Ultimately, the injunction was struck down by the United States Supreme Court.

Childs has made two decisions related to nuclear reactor facilities in South Carolina. First, in August 2018, Childs refused to enjoin a state law that forced a state utility to cut its customers' rates after the failed construction of two new nuclear reactors in Fairfield County. Second, in December 2021, Childs refused to block a vaccine mandate for workers at a South Carolina nuclear facility. Childs ruled that the company did not have to continue employing someone who refused to get vaccinated. Childs again received criticism from The American Prospect regarding her criminal rulings.

=== Potential nomination to the Supreme Court ===
On January 28, 2022, the White House stated that Childs was among those being considered for nomination to the U.S. Supreme Court, to fill the seat would be vacated after Justice Stephen Breyer's retirement. Two days later, one of her home-state United States Senators from South Carolina, Republican Lindsey Graham, publicly voiced his support for her potential nomination. Childs' surprising ascent from district court judge to Supreme Court finalist can also be attributed to Jim Clyburn, the House majority whip, who had been lobbying Biden to nominate Childs notwithstanding concerns over Childs' moderate record as a judge and trial lawyer. Labor rights groups voiced their disapproval with Childs' consideration for the United States Supreme Court, given her private sector experience working at a law firm many considered to be an "anti-union" law firm. On February 22, 2022, President Biden ultimately chose United States Court of Appeals for the District of Columbia Circuit Judge Ketanji Brown Jackson to fill Breyer's seat.

=== Court of appeals service ===
In January 2021, U.S. Representative Jim Clyburn sent a letter to President Biden's transition team encouraging Biden to nominate Childs to the United States Court of Appeals for the District of Columbia Circuit. On December 23, 2021, Biden announced Childs as his nominee for that court, and her nomination was sent to the Senate on January 10, 2022. She was nominated to the seat to be vacated by Judge David S. Tatel, who announced his intent to assume senior status upon confirmation of a successor. On April 27, 2022, a hearing on her nomination was held before the Senate Judiciary Committee. On May 26, 2022, her nomination was reported out of committee by a 17–5 vote. On July 11, 2022, Majority Whip Dick Durbin filed cloture on her nomination. On July 14, 2022, the Senate invoked cloture on her nomination by a 58–33 vote. On July 19, 2022, her nomination was confirmed by a 64–34 vote. She received her judicial commission on July 25, 2022.

== Personal life ==
Childs is married to Floyd Angus, a gastroenterologist, and they have one daughter. She is a Catholic and serves as a trustee on the board of Columbia's St. Martin de Porres Catholic School.

== See also ==
- Joe Biden Supreme Court candidates
- List of African American federal judges
- List of African American jurists

Legal offices
Preceded by G. Ross Anderson	Judge of the United States District Court for the District of South Carolina; 2010–2022	Succeeded by Jacquelyn D. Austin
Preceded by David S. Tatel	Judge of the United States Court of Appeals for the District of Columbia Circuit; 2022–present	Incumbent
