= South Carolina State University School of Law =

The South Carolina State University School of Law was a law school at South Carolina State University in Orangeburg, South Carolina, that existed from 1947 until 1966.

The school came about because of the refusal by South Carolina leaders to integrate the University of South Carolina School of Law, which for many years was the state's only institution for legal education. In 1946, John Howard Wrighten III, a black World War II veteran, applied for admission to USC Law School. Wrighten, however, was denied because of his race. He filed suit in 1946 and was represented by four attorneys, including Thurgood Marshall, who later became an associate justice of the US Supreme Court, according to a story in the Orangeburg Times and Democrat. In July 1946, District judge J. Waites Waring held that "a Negro resident of South Carolina was entitled to the same opportunity and facilities afforded to white residents for obtaining a legal education by and in the state." Waring gave the state of South Carolina three options: that the University of South Carolina admit Wrighten, that the state opens a black law school or that the white law school at USC be closed.

Rather than integrate the University of South Carolina or close it down, the South Carolina General Assembly authorized the establishment of a law school at South Carolina State, then officially known as the Colored Normal, Industrial, Agricultural, and Mechanical College of South Carolina. The school opened in 1947 with eight students. Julius Thomas Williams, III, and Albert Abram Kennedy were the first two graduates of the law school. They were granted admission to the bar by diploma privilege to practice law in South Carolina. Eventually, 50 men and one woman would go to graduate from the law school during its two decades of operation. Its graduates included Matthew J. Perry, who would go on to become the first black lawyer from the Deep South to be appointed to the federal judiciary, and Ernest A. Finney Jr., former chief justice of the South Carolina Supreme Court.

The end came when the University of South Carolina School of Law finally began admitting black students in 1964. Enrollment quickly dwindled at South Carolina State's law school and it closed in June 1966.

The South Carolina State School of Law left a lasting legacy despite its short existence: It trained a group of black attorneys who would go on to challenge segregation, discrimination and inequality in public education during the 1960s, according to R. Scott Baker in Paradoxes of Education: African American Struggles for Educational Equity in Charleston South Carolina, 1926-1972.

In 2005, S.C. Senator Robert Ford introduced a bill to create a study committee to consider the feasibility of establishing a law school at South Carolina State.

At the time, the cost of a law school at S.C. State was estimated at $8 million to build the facility, $500,000 a year for faculty salaries and $125,000 a year for administrative salaries.
