= Costa M. Pleicones =

American judge

Chief Justice of the South Carolina Supreme Court
- In office January 1, 2016 – December 31, 2016
- Preceded by: Jean H. Toal
- Succeeded by: Donald W. Beatty

Associate Justice of the South Carolina Supreme Court
- In office March 23, 2000 – December 31, 2015
- Preceded by: Jean H. Toal
- Succeeded by: John Cannon Few

Personal details
- Born: February 29, 1944 (age 82) Greenville, South Carolina, U.S.
- Education: Wofford College (B.A.) University of South Carolina School of Law (J.D.)

Costa M. Pleicones (born February 29, 1944) is an American jurist who served as the chief justice of the South Carolina Supreme Court. He has served on the court since being elected in February 2000 to replace Justice Toal (who assumed the chief justice position at that time). He was sworn in on March 29, 2000. Before being elected to the court, his judicial experience included serving on the courts for the city of Columbia and as a Circuit Court Judge. On May 27, 2015, Justice Pleicones was elected to replace Chief Justice Jean Toal. His term began January 1, 2016, and his investiture as Chief Justice of South Carolina took place on January 7, 2016.

Justice Pleicones was born in Greenville and grew up in Columbia, South Carolina. He attended Wofford College and graduated with a degree in English in 1965. Prior to his election to the South Carolina judiciary Pleicones was active for more than thirty years in the United States Army Reserve where he served as an officer in the Judge Advocate's General Corps. The justice has also worked in private practice and as a public defender for Richland County.

A frequent lecturer, Costa Pleicones has been called upon by many professional organizations including CLE programs by the South Carolina Bar. He presently serves as a member of the Wofford College Board of Trustees.

== Personal life ==
Pleicones was born in South Carolina to Lecha and Mike Pleicones. During his childhood, he developed a close friendship with his predecessor, Justice Jean Toal. He comes from a Greek background and follows the Greek Orthodox faith. Pleicones is married and has two children.

== Sources ==
- Pleicones, Costa M. (1995). Courtroom practice (Bridge the gap). South Carolina Bar, Continuing Legal Education.
- Edgar, Walter (1998). South Carolina: A History. University of South Carolina Press. ISBN 1-57003-255-6.
- South Carolina. Supreme Court (2009). Reports of Cases Heard and Determined by the Supreme Court of South Carolina (109). General Books LLC. ISBN 1-150-03834-9.
- Justice Costa M. Pleicones - South Carolina SUPREME COURT
