= Jonathan Jasper Wright =

American judge (1840–1877)

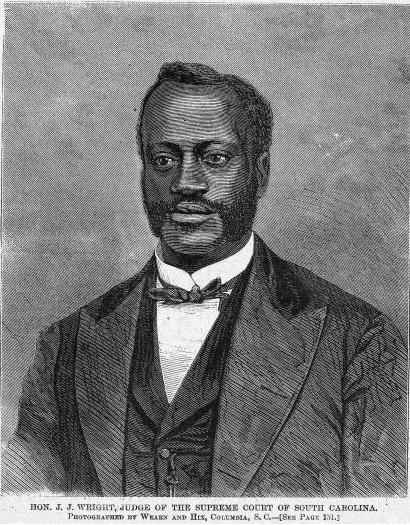
- Jonathan Jasper Wright (c. 1870)

Associate Justice of the South Carolina Supreme Court
- In office January 30, 1870 – December 1, 1877
- Preceded by: Solomon L. Hoge
- Succeeded by: Alexander Cheves Haskell

Member of the South Carolina Senate from Beaufort County
- In office November 24, 1868 – January 30, 1870
- Preceded by: Richard J. Davant
- Succeeded by: Robert Smalls

Personal details
- Born: February 11, 1840 Luzerne, Pennsylvania
- Died: February 18, 1885 (aged 45) Charleston, South Carolina

Jonathan Jasper Wright (February 11, 1840 – February 18, 1885) was an African-American lawyer who served as a state senator and judge on the Supreme Court of the State of South Carolina during Reconstruction from 1870 to 1877.

== Biography ==
Wright was born on February 11, 1840, in Luzerne County, Pennsylvania. When he was about six years old his parents moved to Montrose, Susquehanna County, Pennsylvania. He attended the district school during the winter months, working for the neighboring farmers the rest of the year.

He saved up a small sum of money and entered Lancasterian University in Ithaca, New York State. After a thorough course of study there, he returned to the village where his parents resided. He received an honorary LL.D from Avery College in Pittsburgh. He entered the office of a law firm, where he read law for two years, supporting himself by teaching. He subsequently entered the office of Judge Collins, in Wilkes-Barre, Pennsylvania, with whom he read law for another year. He applied for admission to the Bar but the committee refused to examine him because of racial prejudice.

In April 1865, Wright was sent by the American Missionary Society to Beaufort, South Carolina, as a teacher and laborer among the freed slaves. He remained in Beaufort until the Civil Rights Act passed. Then he returned to Montrose, Pennsylvania, and demanded an examination for the Bar. The Committee found him qualified, and recommended his admission to the Bar. He was admitted August 13, 1865, and was the first African American admitted to practice law in Pennsylvania.

In April 1866, Wright was appointed by General Oliver Otis Howard, head of the Freedmen's Bureau in Beaufort, to be the legal adviser for the freedmen. In July 1868 he was elected to the Constitutional Convention of South Carolina. He was the convention vice-president and helped draft the judiciary section of the State Constitution, which remains today. Wright was soon afterward elected state senator from Beaufort County. On February 1, 1870, he was elected to the South Carolina Supreme Court. He served for seven years, until the white Democrats regained control of state government in 1877. Wright left the Court and entered into private practice in Charleston. He died of tuberculosis in 1885.

The United States Law Review gave a scornful summary of his career after his death. His death was covered on the front page of the Charleston News and Courier including the statement that "one more relic of Reconstruction disappears."

In 1997, portrait artist Larry Francis Lebby was commissioned to produce a painting of Wright, which was unveiled in the South Carolina Supreme Court building in Columbia, South Carolina.

== See also ==
- List of African-American jurists
- List of first minority male lawyers and judges in South Carolina
