= Samuel Jones Lee =

American politician (1844–1895)

31st Speaker of the South Carolina House of Representatives
- In office 1874–1876
- Preceded by: Franklin J. Moses Jr.
- Succeeded by: R.B. Elliot

South Carolina House of Representatives
- In office 1868–1871
- In office 1872–1874

Personal details
- Born: November 27, 1844 Abbeville District, South Carolina, U.S.
- Died: April 1, 1895 (aged 50) Charleston, South Carolina, U.S.
- Resting place: Friendly Union Cemetery, Charleston
- Party: Republican
- Spouse: R. A. Lee

Military service
- Allegiance: Confederate States of America
- Branch/service: Confederate States Army
- Unit: 14th South Carolina Infantry
- Battles/wars: American Civil War

Samuel Jones Lee (November 27, 1844 – April 1, 1895) was an African-American Civil War veteran of the Confederacy, politician and lawyer from South Carolina. He served as the first African-American Speaker of the South Carolina House of Representatives and was a committed member of the Republican Party.

== Early life ==
Lee was born in Abbeville District, South Carolina, on the plantation belonging to Samuel J. McGowan. His mother was a free black woman and Lee asserted that his father was Samuel J. Lee of Charleston, although no documentation has been found to prove this - some historians have argued that McGowan was his father.

=== Civil War ===
When he was sixteen Lee followed McGowan and served with the Confederate Army during the Civil War, although there is no official record of his service; however, he was photographed armed and in the uniform of McGowan's regiment, the 14th South Carolina Infantry. Lee claimed that he was wounded twice during the course of the war: once at Second Manassas, where McGowan was also wounded, and then again at the Battle of Hanover.

== Career ==
=== Politics ===
After the Civil War, Lee became a farmer in Abbeville. In 1868 he entered politics, serving on the Edgefield County commission before being elected to the General Assembly that same year. He represented Edgefield County from 1868 to 1871 and then Aiken County from 1872 to 1874. In 1872 Lee became the Speaker of the South Carolina House of Representatives.

In 1874 Lee served as counsel to the legislative committee during the impeachment trial of state treasurer Francis Cardozo. Later that year Lee left the legislature and unsuccessfully ran for attorney general. He continued to serve as an Aiken County commissioner.

=== Law ===
Lee became a member of the South Carolina Bar in 1872 and used his connections to McGowan, himself a qualified lawyer, as well as his cooperation with the white establishment to establish a successful legal career. Lee was noted for his oratory skills and legal acumen, with an unprecedented twenty-seven appearances before the state supreme court.

== Later life ==
Even after his retirement from politics he remained active in the Republican Party, regularly speaking at party events. In 1891 he was appointed a general in the state's "colored militia", a position in which he continued to serve until his death.

On 1 April 1895 Lee died in Charleston. At the news of his death the United States Circuit Court adjourned. He was buried with military honors at Friendly Union Cemetery, Charleston, in a funeral attended by six thousand people.

== Legacy ==
Lee was the first African-American Speaker of the South Carolina House of Representatives. Despite this achievement, he is described by University of South Carolina academic Lewis W. Burke as having "left a trail of scandal in the wake of his political career." In 1875, while serving as an Aiken County commissioner, Lee was convicted of issuing fraudulent checks and in 1877 he was indicted on various counts of public corruption; however, he was granted immunity from prosecution in exchange for his testimony against Francis Cardozo. Once again, Lee was charged with corruption in 1879, although these charges were dropped.

In 1998, the South Carolina House of Representatives unveiled a portrait of Lee painted by South Carolina artist Larry Francis Lebby. The portrait now hangs in the gallery of the House chambers.
