= List of first minority male lawyers and judges in South Carolina =

This is a list of the first minority male lawyer(s) and judge(s) in South Carolina. It includes the year in which the men were admitted to practice law (in parentheses). Also included are men who achieved other distinctions such becoming the first in their state to graduate from law school or become a political figure.

== Firsts in South Carolina's history ==
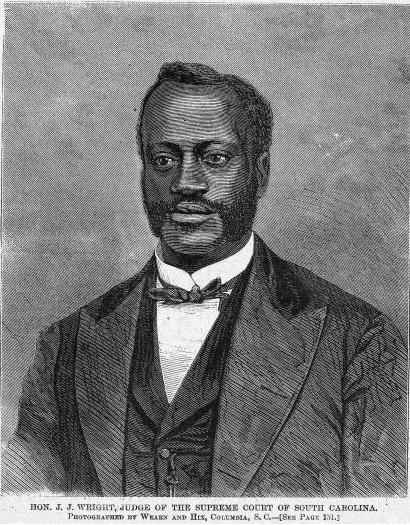
Jonathan Jasper Wright: First African American male lawyer (1867) and Justice of the South Carolina Supreme Court (1870)

=== Lawyers ===
- First Jewish American male: Moses Myers (1793)
- First African American male: Jonathan Jasper Wright (1867)
- First African American male to practice before the South Carolina Supreme Court: Arthur Chester Platt (1922)

=== State judges ===
- First African American male (judicial officer): Samuel B. Thompson around 1868
- First Jewish American male (South Carolina Supreme Court; Chief Justice): Franklin J. Moses Sr. in 1868
- First African American male (South Carolina Supreme Court): Jonathan Jasper Wright (1867) in 1870
- First African American male (judge): Richard E. Fields (1948)
- First African American male (probate court): Bernard R. Fielding Sr. in 1976
- First African American male elected (probate court): Harry C. Brown (1987) in 1987
- First African American male (South Carolina Supreme Court; since Reconstruction): Ernest A. Finney Jr. (1954) in 1985
- First African American male (Chief Justice; South Carolina Supreme Court): Ernest A. Finney Jr. (1954) in 1994
- First Native American male (Chief Judge; South Carolina Court of Appeals): James Lockemy in 2016

=== Federal judges ===
- First African American male (U.S. District Court for the District of South Carolina): Matthew J. Perry (1959) in 1979

=== South Carolina Bar Association ===
- First African American male president: I. S. Leevy Johnson (1968) in 1985

== Firsts in local history ==
- Burnele Venable Powell: First Black male to serve as the Dean of the University of South Carolina School of Law (2003) [Lexington and Richland Counties, South Carolina]
- Al Bradley: First African American male magistrate in Aiken County, South Carolina
- Bernard R. Fielding Sr.: First African American male probate judge in Charleston County, South Carolina (1990)
- Reuben Brewington Clark: First African American male magistrate in Clarendon County, South Carolina (1977)
- Donald J. Sampson: First African American male lawyer in Greenville County, South Carolina
- Harry C. Brown (1987): First African American male elected as a probate judge in Jasper County, South Carolina (1987)
- Luther Battiste III: First Black male to serve as President of the Richland County Bar Association
- J.W. Johnes: First African American male to serve as a Justice of the Peace in Spartanburg, Spartanburg County, South Carolina
- Matthew J. Perry (1959): First African American male lawyer in Spartanburg, Spartanburg County, South Carolina
- Albert Smith: First Black male to serve as President of Spartanburg County Bar Association
- Alex Chatman: First African American male magistrate in Greeleyville, Williamsburg County, South Carolina

== See also ==
- List of first minority male lawyers and judges in the United States

== Other topics of interest ==
- List of first women lawyers and judges in the United States
- List of first women lawyers and judges in South Carolina
