= W. Lewis Burke =

American educator, historian (born 1948)

- Born: William Lewis Burke Jr. 1948 (age 76–77); United States
- Education: Mississippi State University, University of South Carolina School of Law
- Occupation(s): Lawyer, historian, educator, researcher, editor, author
- Known for: Law, American history, African American history, race relations

William Lewis Burke Jr. (born 1948) is an American historian, lawyer, academic, editor, and author. He is a distinguished professor emeritus at the Joseph F. Rice School of Law at University of South Carolina (USC). His work focuses on American history, law, and race relations.

== Biography ==
He has authored books on law, history, race relations, and African Americans. He co-edited a book about American judge Matthew J. Perry in 2004. Burke's 2017 book, All for Civil Rights: African American Lawyers in South Carolina, 1868–1968 is about African American lawyers in South Carolina from the Reconstruction era until 1968. It was described as "definitive" by Hyman Rubin in The South Carolina Historical Magazine. He has appeared on C-SPAN.

Burke was a professor at the Joseph F. Rice School of Law at University of South Carolina (USC) from 1982 to 2015; a chairman for the clinical legal studies department at USC from 2002 to 2015; and was an affiliate faculty for the African American studies department at USC.

== Publications ==
=== As author ===
- Burke, W. Lewis (1990). Consumer Law and Practice in South Carolina. South Carolina Bar Continuing Legal Education Division. ISBN 9780943856186.
- Burke, W. Lewis (2017). All for Civil Rights: African American Lawyers in South Carolina, 1868–1968. Southern Legal Studies Series. University of Georgia Press. ISBN 9780820350981.

=== As editor ===
- Underwood, James Lowell; Burke, Jr., W. Lewis, eds. (2000). At Freedom's Door: African American Founding Fathers and Lawyers in Reconstruction South Carolina. Eric Foner (contributor). University of South Carolina Press. ISBN 9781570033575.
- Burke Jr., W. Lewis; Gergel, Belinda F., eds. (2004). Matthew J. Perry: The Man, His Times and His Legacy. University of South Carolina Press. ISBN 9781570035340. (2004)
- Burke, W. Lewis; Underwood, James Lowell, eds. (2006). The Dawn of Religious Freedom in South Carolina. Walter Edgar (introduction). University of South Carolina Press. ISBN 9781570036217.
- Burke Jr., W. Lewis; Assey, Joan P., eds. (2015). Madam Chief Justice: South Carolina's Jean Hoefer Toal. Ruth Bader Ginsburg (introduction), Sandra Day O'Connor (forward). University of South Carolina Press. ISBN 9781611176926.
