= Robinson Everett =

American judge (1928–2009)

Senior Judge of the United States Court of Appeals for the Armed Forces
- In office January 1, 1992 – June 12, 2009

Chief Judge of the United States Court of Appeals for the Armed Forces
- In office 1980–1990
- Preceded by: Albert B. Fletcher Jr.
- Succeeded by: Eugene R. Sullivan

Judge of the United States Court of Appeals for the Armed Forces
- In office April 16, 1980 – January 1, 1992
- Appointed by: Jimmy Carter
- Preceded by: Matthew J. Perry
- Succeeded by: Susan J. Crawford

Personal details
- Born: Robinson O. Everett; March 18, 1928 Durham, North Carolina, U.S.
- Died: June 12, 2009 (aged 81)
- Education: Harvard University (BA, JD); Duke University (LLM)

Robinson O. Everett (March 18, 1928 – June 12, 2009) was an American lawyer, judge and a professor of law at Duke University.

== Family and education ==
Everett was born in Durham, North Carolina, to a family of lawyers: his grandfather and both of his parents were noted North Carolina attorneys. His father, Reuben Oscar Everett, was one of the first five law students at Duke and his mother, Kathrine Everett, was one of the first women to graduate from the University of North Carolina School of Law, where she ranked at the head of her class and was the first woman to argue and win a case before the North Carolina Supreme Court. In 1954, the Everetts were the first family of lawyers sworn in together to the bar of the Supreme Court of the United States.

Everett graduated magna cum laude in 1947 from Harvard University, at age 19. He also graduated magna cum laude from Harvard Law School, where he was on the Harvard Law Review. He also received a Master of Laws from Duke University School of Law in 1959.

== Career ==
Everett was admitted to the North Carolina bar and joined the Duke law school faculty that same year at age twenty two. He holds the record as the youngest faculty member in Duke's history. In over fifty years of teaching at Duke (as well as at the University of North Carolina School of Law and Wake Forest University School of Law), Everett regularly taught courses in criminal law, criminal procedure, law and national defense and military law. He was the founder of the Center on Law, Ethics, and National Security at the Duke University School of Law.

During the Korean War Everett joined the United States Air Force, where he was assigned to the Judge Advocate General's Corps. From 1961 to 1964, Everett served part-time as counsel to the Subcommittee on Constitutional Rights of the United States Senate Committee on the Judiciary, which led to the enactment of the Military Justice Act of 1968. He was appointed by President Jimmy Carter to the serve as a senior judge for the Court of Appeals for the Armed Services and as a Commissioner and then Chief Judge for the United States Court of Military Appeals (now the Court of Appeals for the Armed Forces) from 1980 until 1990.

He was the author of the textbook Military Justice in the Armed Forces of the United States, and of numerous articles on military law, criminal procedure, evidence and other legal topics.

As an attorney, Everett practiced in the following areas of law: administrative law; civil and criminal appeals; commercial real property; commercial litigation; construction litigation; zoning and land use regulation. Everett was also actively involved in redistricting litigation. As both counsel and plaintiff, he twice successfully challenged in the U.S. Supreme Court congressional districts drawn by the North Carolina General Assembly which violated the Fourteenth Amendment of the U.S. Constitution.

== Professional memberships ==
He was active in bar and professional associations, having served as president of the Durham County, North Carolina Bar Association; as a member of the North Carolina State Bar Council; as both a member and chair of the American Bar Association's Standing Committee on Military Law; and as a member of the Advisory Committee on the Federal Rules of Criminal Procedure and Evidence. He was a life member of the National Conference of Commissioners on Uniform State Laws and the American Law Institute. He was a Fellow of the American Bar Foundation and a director of the American Judicature Society.

== Awards and recognition ==
In 1993, he received the Charles S. Murphy Award for public service from the Duke Law Alumni Association. In 2000, he received the ABA's Morris I. Liebman Award. He was also the recipient of the Professionalism Award from the Chief Justice's Committee on Professionalism. He was the first recipient of the Judge Advocates Association's life service award, which is incidentally named after him. He received the John J. Parker Memorial Award from the North Carolina Bar Association in 2004.
