= USC School of Law =

USC School of Law may refer to:

- USC Gould School of Law, University of Southern California (Los Angeles, California)
- Joseph F. Rice School of Law, University of South Carolina (Columbia, South Carolina)
