= James M. Perry (lawyer) =

American lawyer (1894–1964)

James Margrave Perry was the first female lawyer in South Carolina.

Perry, a third daughter, was born on May 10, 1894, in Greenville, South Carolina. Referred to as "Miss Jim", she was named after her father (a stenography and accounting teacher at Greenville Female College) who had wanted a son to carry on his name. Perry was home schooled by her mother before entering the Greenville Female College in 1909. She graduated with a B.A. in 1913 and went on to earn her Juris Doctor from the University of California, Berkeley in 1917. She was automatically admitted into the State Bar of California.

After returning to South Carolina, Perry became the first woman to register to practice law on May 3, 1918, shortly after Governor Richard I. Manning signing a bill that gave women the opportunity to do so. She started working at Haynsworth & Haynsworth and was named as a partner in 1937. This was a historical achievement, as no other South Carolinian female lawyer at the time had been named a partner. In 1955, she became one of the first women in the United States to chair a local bar association when she became the President of the Greenville Bar Association.

Perry died on April 19, 1964, in Greenville, South Carolina.

== See also ==
- List of first women lawyers and judges in South Carolina
