= Larry Francis Lebby =

American painter and printmaker (1950–2019)

- Born: Larry Francis Lebby; September 8, 1950; Dixiana, Lexington County, South Carolina, U.S.
- Died: July 21, 2019 (aged 68); Columbia, South Carolina
- Education: Allen University, University of South Carolina
- Known for: Painting
- Movement: Contemporary

Larry Francis Lebby (September 8, 1950 – July 21, 2019) was a native South Carolinian. He was a nationally known painter, printmaker and artist working in Columbia, South Carolina.

== Early life and education ==
Lebby was one of the Black students to integrate Airport High School. He attended Allen University and transferred to the University of South Carolina, graduating with a Master of Fine Arts in 1976. Lebby spoke about the role of University of South Carolina President Thomas F. Jones in his successful transfer.

== Artistic career ==
Lebby served on the board of the South Carolina Arts Commission (affiliated with the National Endowment for the Arts) and on the Governor's Task Force for the Arts.

== Official portraits ==
Lebby was known for his portraiture: a number of his state and other commissioned portraits of famous legislators, judges, educators and activists hang in the South Carolina State House and other public spaces:

- Benjamin Mayes (1981)
- Richard Theodore Greener (1984)
- Modjeska Monteith Simkins (1995)
- Samuel Jones Lee and Robert B. Elliott (1998)
- Jonathan Jasper Wright (1998)
- Matthew J. Perry, Judge, US District Court (2014)
- Clementa C. Pinckney, South Carolina Senator (2016)
- Ernest A. Finney Jr., South Carolina Supreme Court Chief Justice (2018)
- Jimmy Carter, US President

Lebby was commissioned to create the portrait of Senator Pinckney after the murder of Pinckney and eight others in the Charleston church shooting in 2015. The portrait was unveiled in May 2016, and hangs in the South Carolina Senate chambers. Speakers at the unveiling included State Senators Gerald Malloy, Hugh Leatherman, and John W. Matthews Jr.; State Representative Joseph Neal; the widow, Mrs. Jennifer Pinckney, and the artist Larry Lebby himself.

== Death ==
Lebby died in 2019.

== Awards and legacy ==
In 1987, the South Carolina Legislature noted the 'local, national and international' recognition' that Lebby's work had received with a Concurrent Resolution.

In 2024, Lebby was included in the 2024 South Carolina African American History Calendar.

In September 2024, Lebby was posthumously inducted into the Lexington School District Two Inaugural Fine Arts Hall of Fame.

== Gallery ==
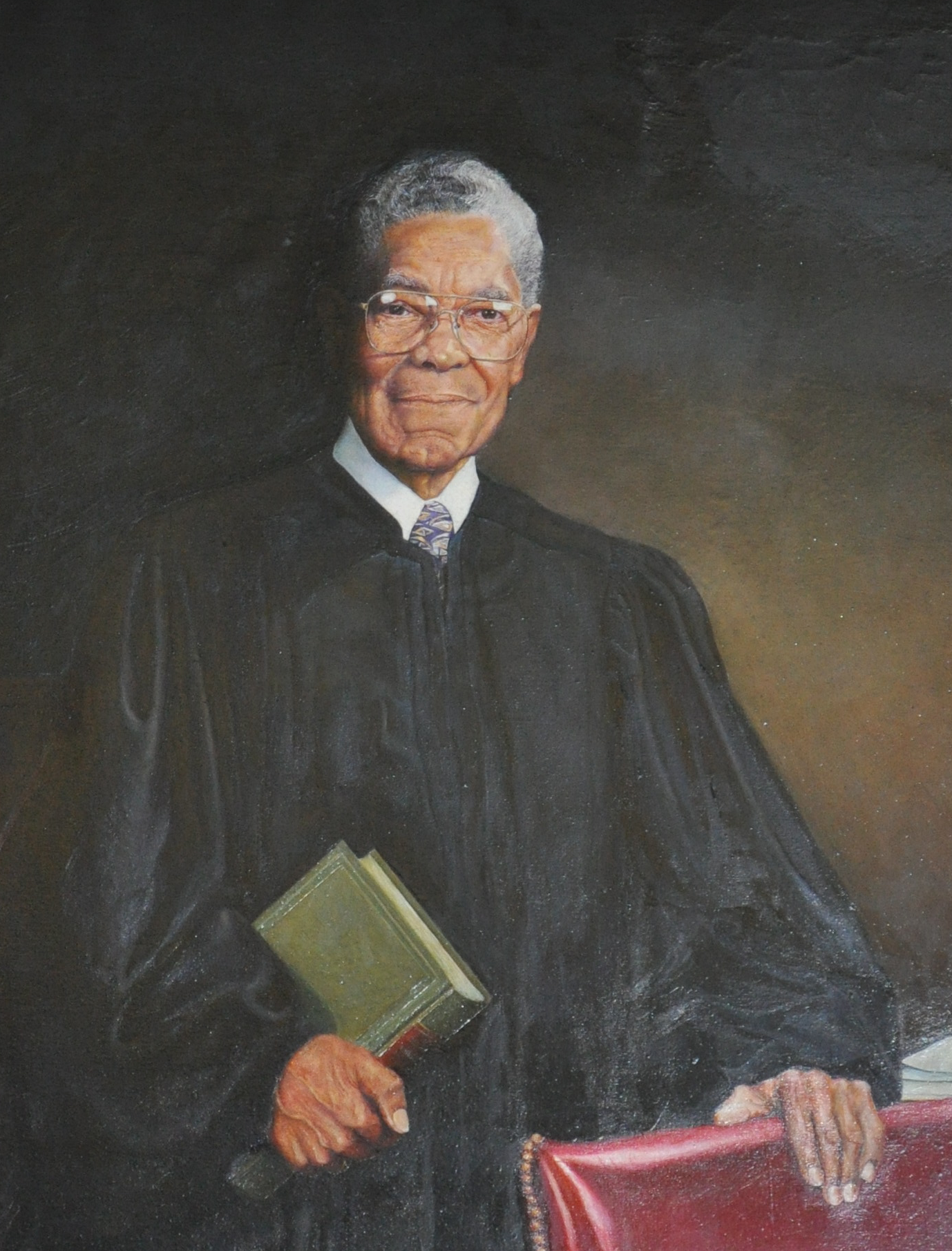
Portrait of Judge Matthew J. Perry

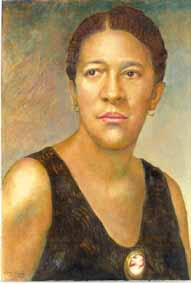
Portrait of Modjeska Monteith Simkins
