= Friendship Nine =

Group of people

The Friendship Nine, or Rock Hill Nine, was a group of African-American men who went to jail after staging a sit-in at a segregated McCrory's lunch counter in Rock Hill, South Carolina in 1961. The group gained nationwide attention because they followed the 1960 Nashville sit-ins strategy of "Jail, No Bail", which lessened the huge financial burden civil rights groups were facing as the sit-in movement spread across the South. They became known as the Friendship Nine because eight of the nine men were students at Rock Hill's Friendship Junior College.

== Background ==
The first sit-in happened in February 1960 when four black students from North Carolina Agricultural and Technical State University sat down at a segregated Woolworth's lunch counter in Greensboro, North Carolina. The movement spread across the South, reaching Rock Hill on Feb. 12, when about 100 black students staged sit-ins at various downtown lunch counters. Over the next year, several sit-ins were held in the city.

== Ongoing demonstrations ==
On Jan. 31, 1961, students from Friendship Junior College and others picketed McCrory's on Main Street in Rock Hill to protest the segregated lunch counters at the business. They walked in, took seats at the counter and ordered hamburgers, soft drinks and coffee.

The next day, 10 were convicted of trespassing and breach of the peace and sentenced to serve 30 days in jail or to pay a $100 fine. One man paid a fine, but the remaining nine — eight of whom were Friendship students — chose to take the sentence of 30 days hard labor at the York County Prison Farm. Their choosing jail over a fine or bail marked a first in the Civil Rights Movement since the 1960 Nashville sit-ins, and it sparked the "jail, no bail" strategy that came to be emulated in other places. A growing number of people participated in the sit-ins and marches that continued in Rock Hill through the spring and into the summer.

== Prison strikes ==
Since these protestors chose prison instead of bail, they were sent to a work camp, where twice they refused to work, were put on bread and water as punishment.

== The nine ==
In 2007 the city of Rock Hill unveiled an historic marker honoring the Friendship Nine at a reception honoring the men. At that time, eight of the Friendship Nine were living.

- Robert McCullough (died on August 7, 2006 )
- John Gaines (died on June 5, 2024)
- Thomas Gaither (at the time, he was a field secretary with the Congress of Racial Equality and was the only one of the nine who was not a Friendship student; died on December 23, 2024)
- Clarence Graham (died on March 25, 2016)
- Willie Thomas [W.T. "Dub"] Massey (is now a Substitute teacher in the Rock Hill area)
- Willie McCleod (died on December 31, 2020)
- James Wells (died on July 7, 2018)
- David Williamson Jr.
- Mack Workman (died on March 5, 2024)

== The significance ==
"What made the Rock Hill action so timely ... was that it responded to a tactical dilemma that was arising in SNCC discussions across the South: how to avoid the crippling limitations of scarce bail money," wrote Taylor Branch in Parting the Waters, his Pulitzer Prize winning account of the Civil Rights Movement. "The obvious advantage of 'jail, no bail' was that it reversed the financial burden of the protest, costing the demonstrators no cash while obligating the white authorities to pay for jail space and food. The obvious disadvantage was that staying in jail represented a quantum leap in commitment above the old barrier of arrest, lock-up, and bail-out."

== Convictions overturned ==
In 2015, Judge John C. Hayes III (nephew of the original judge who sentenced the Friendship Nine to 30 days jail time at York County, SC chain-gang) of Rock Hill overturned the convictions of the nine, stating: "We cannot rewrite history, but we can right history." At the same occasion, Prosecutor Kevin Brackett apologized to the eight men still living, who were in court. The men were represented at the hearing by Ernest A. Finney, Jr., the same lawyer who had defended them originally, who subsequently went on to become the first African-American Chief Justice of the South Carolina Supreme Court since Reconstruction.
