= Classical education =

Classical education may refer to:

- Modern, educational practices and educational movements:
  - An education in the Classics, especially in Ancient Greek and Latin
  - Classical education movement, based on the trivium (grammar, logic, rhetoric) and quadrivium (astronomy, arithmetic, music and geometry)
  - Classical Christian education, an application of the classical education movement with an emphasis on the Christian faith
  - Classical Islamic education, see:
    - Madrasah
    - Ijazah
- Historical, educational practices and values:
  - Education in ancient Greece
  - Education in ancient Rome
  - The curriculum of the Middle Ages, see Medieval university
  - Classical Chinese education, see:
    - Imperial examination
    - Scholar-bureaucrats
