= Alexander Cheves Haskell =

American judge and politician (1839–1910)

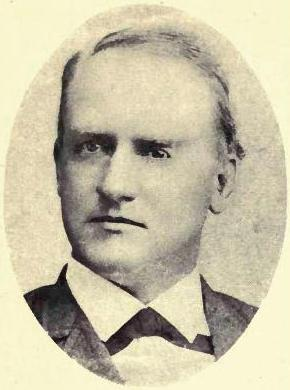
- A.C. Haskell as a law professor

Associate Justice of the South Carolina Supreme Court
- In office December 1877 – 1879
- Preceded by: Jonathan Jasper Wright
- Succeeded by: Samuel McGowan

Personal details
- Born: September 22, 1839 Abbeville County, South Carolina
- Died: April 13, 1910 (aged 70)
- Spouses: Rebecca Coles Singleton (m. 1861; died 1862) Alice Van Yeveren Alexander (m. 1872)
- Education: South Carolina College (now University of South Carolina)

Alexander Cheves Haskell (September 22, 1839 – April 13, 1910) was a Colonel in the Confederate Army during the American Civil War and a Democratic politician in Reconstruction era South Carolina.

== Early life ==
Haskell was born in Abbeville County and raised in Columbia, where he graduated second in his class from South Carolina College and was a member of the Delta Kappa Epsilon fraternity, right before the start of the American Civil War.

== Civil War ==
He enthusiastically volunteered for service in the Confederate Army and was mustered in the First Regiment of the South Carolina Volunteer Infantry, serving as an Assistant Adjutant General for Maxcy Gregg. En route to Virginia in September 1861 for action in the Eastern Theater, Haskell married Rebecca Coles Singleton in Charlottesville. She died on June 26, 1862, after the birth of a daughter six days earlier.

The First South Carolina Regiment initially saw significant action in 1862 at the Seven Days Battles and would play a major role in the Second Battle of Bull Run by repulsing six Union assaults. On May 27, 1864, Martin Gary promoted Haskell to Colonel and placed him in charge of the 7th SC Cavalry in the brigade formerly commanded by Wade Hampton III.

Haskell was injured four times in the war, at the battles of Fredericksburg, Chancellorsville, Cold Harbor and Darbytown Road. It was at Darbytown Road where he was most seriously injured after suffering a shot to the head and losing the function of his left eye, but he managed to recover in time to participate in the Appomattox Campaign. Haskell was appointed by General Lee to surrender the Confederate cavalry of the Army of Northern Virginia at the Appomattox Court House on April 12, 1865.

== Postwar activities ==
After the war, in 1870, Haskell married Alice Van Yeveren Alexander, the sister of Edward Porter Alexander.

Haskell practiced law in South Carolina and was chosen in 1876 to be the chairman of the state Democratic party Executive Committee. His efforts were instrumental in the gubernatorial election by uniting the party for the straightout cause to redeem the state from Radical Republican rule during Reconstruction. Governor Wade Hampton rewarded him for his dedication and fervor by having Haskell placed on the state supreme court in 1877. In the 1880s, Haskell became the president of the Columbia and Greenville Railroad.

Haskell and conservative Democrats were bitterly opposed to Ben Tillman's candidacy for governor in 1890. Tillman was an uncouth demagogue who expressed his opposition to everything favored by the conservatives and further irritating Haskell was that while both men lost the function of an eye, Haskell courageously continued to serve in the Confederate army while Tillman dodged service. Failing to beat Tillman at the state Democratic convention, Haskell led a straightout Democratic ticket in the general election and even appealed for votes from blacks and Republicans. Many in the state refused to vote for anyone other than the official Democratic candidate out of fear of giving Republicans another chance at state government and thus the Haskell ticket fared poorly.

Until his death on April 13, 1910, Haskell was serving as the vice president of National Loan & Exchange Bank of Columbia. He was buried in Columbia at Elmwood Cemetery.

== Children ==
From his first marriage, to Rebecca Coles Singleton (1838–1862), Haskell had one daughter:

- Rebecca Singleton Haskell (born June 20, 1862)

Haskell had ten children from his marriage with Alice Van Yeveren Alexander (born 1848):

- Alexander Cheves Haskell Jr. (born August 15, 1871)
- Louise Porter Haskell (born July 25, 1872)
- Mary Elizabeth Haskell (December 11, 1873 – October 9, 1964)
- Anthony Porter Haskell (born January 27, 1875)
- Marion Alexander Haskell (born June 5, 1876)
- Charles Thomson Haskell (born April 25, 1878)
- Frederika Christina Haskell (born December 10, 1880)
- Adam Leopold Haskell (born September 1, 1882)
- Alice Van Yeveren Haskell (born June 21, 1884)
- Suzanna Courtonne Haskell (born February 16, 1886)
