= Matthew J. Perry =

American judge (1921–2011)

Matthew J. Perry Jr.
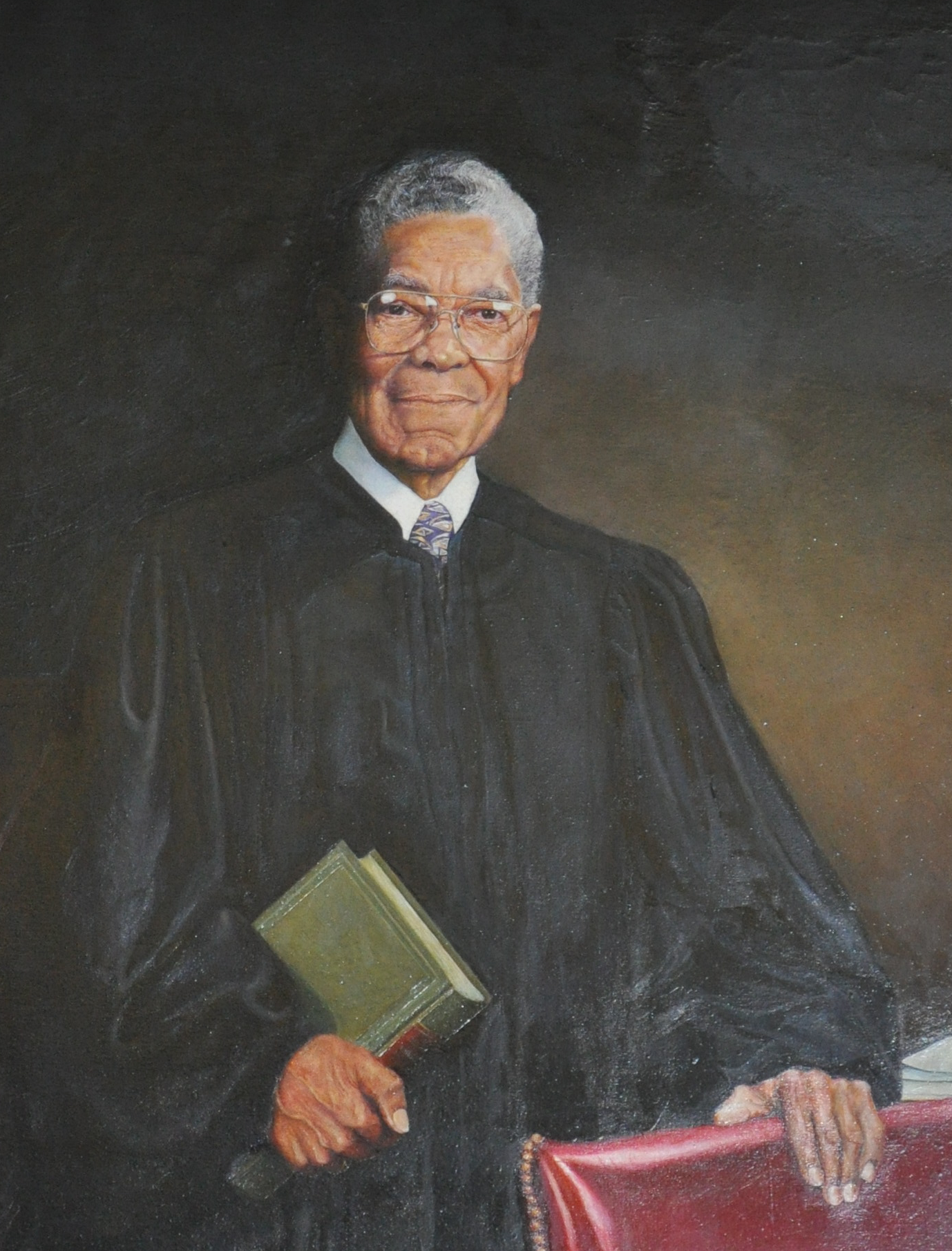

Senior Judge of the United States District Court for the District of South Carolina
- In office October 1, 1995 – July 29, 2011

Judge of the United States District Court for the District of South Carolina
- In office September 20, 1979 – October 1, 1995
- Appointed by: Jimmy Carter
- Preceded by: Seat established by 92 Stat. 1629
- Succeeded by: Patrick Michael Duffy

Judge of the United States Court of Military Appeals
- In office February 18, 1976 – September 20, 1979
- Appointed by: Gerald Ford
- Preceded by: Robert E. Quinn
- Succeeded by: Robinson Everett

Personal details
- Born: Matthew James Perry Jr. August 3, 1921 Columbia, South Carolina
- Died: July 29, 2011 (aged 89) Columbia, South Carolina
- Education: South Carolina State University (BS); South Carolina State University; School of Law (LLB)

Matthew James Perry Jr. (August 3, 1921 – July 29, 2011) was an attorney and in 1979 appointed as the first African-American United States district judge in South Carolina, serving on the United States District Court for the District of South Carolina. In 1976, he had been the first African-American attorney from the Deep South to be appointed to the federal judiciary when he served on the United States Court of Military Appeals. Perry established his career with civil rights litigation, defending Gloria Blackwell in Orangeburg, South Carolina, in her 1962 suit against her arrest for sitting in the whites-only area of the regional hospital while waiting for emergency treatment for her daughter. Other landmark cases included achieving the integration of Clemson University and reapportionment of the state legislature.

== Early life, military service, education, and career ==
Born in Columbia, South Carolina, Perry attended local segregated schools and started college studying business. He served during World War II in the United States Army from 1943 to 1946. He finished college after the war, receiving a Bachelor of Science degree from South Carolina State University in 1948. He went on to earn a Juris Doctor from South Carolina State University School of Law in 1951. He was in private practice in Spartanburg, South Carolina from 1951 to 1961.

== Civil rights activism ==
Moving to the state capital of Columbia, Perry was in private practice from 1961 to 1976. He built his reputation as a civil rights attorney in the 1960s. When finishing his undergraduate degree after WWII, Perry concluded that he needed to learn and practice law, due to "a growing awareness of racial injustices, many of them manifested by state laws."

Perry gained notoriety by representing Gloria Blackwell, an African-American teacher in Orangeburg, South Carolina, who was arrested with her daughter Lurma Rackley for sitting in a "whites only" waiting room while awaiting emergency treatment for the girl. Perry insisted that he be allowed to build the case around racial discrimination. He was charged with contempt and briefly jailed for making what the court deemed to be "remarks disrespectful to the court." The case against Blackwell was eventually dismissed by the court, and the hospital was integrated thanks in part to Perry's efforts.

Perry led the successful court case in 1963 for Harvey B. Gantt to integrate Clemson University. Gantt successfully enrolled and graduated, the first African-American student to enroll at the formerly all-white institution. Perry also led a major South Carolina reapportionment case in 1972, to require redistricting in order to more fairly represent urban areas in relation to their population, based on the "one man, one vote" principle. Numerous state legislatures had not redistricted since the beginning of the 20th century, although required to review apportionment after every decennial census.

Perry ran for the United States House of Representatives as a Democrat in 1974, but lost to Republican incumbent Floyd Spence.

Chief United States District Judge Joseph Anderson once wrote "to say that Matthew Perry was good in the courtroom is like saying Mickey Mantle knew how to swing a bat . . . Aristotle taught that lawyers and judges should be the very personification of justice. Matthew J. Perry Jr. comes as close as any person I have known to meeting Aristotle's ideal." Perry led many landmark civil rights cases, including the case that resulted in the integration of Clemson University through the Perry won the case that forced Clemson University administrators to accept and enroll African-American students.

He managed to win over everyone he came across in the process of litigation, including opponents. Former Clemson President Robert Cook Edwards stated that "Matthew Perry's gentle personality and character were the ingredients that made it (the peaceful integration of Clemson) possible to happen without bloodshed."

== Federal judicial service ==
Perry was the first African-American lawyer from the Deep South to be appointed to the federal judiciary. In 1976, President Gerald Ford appointed Perry to the United States Military Court of Appeals (now the United States Court of Appeals for the Armed Forces) in Washington, D.C. Perry's nomination was even supported by Senator Strom Thurmond, known as a segregationist and Dixiecrat. Perry had dated Thurmond's daughter, Essie Mae Washington-Williams, briefly in 1947.

On July 5, 1979, Perry was nominated by President Jimmy Carter to a new seat on the United States District Court for the District of South Carolina created by 92 Stat. 1629. He was confirmed by the United States Senate on September 19, 1979, and received his commission the following day. He was the first African-American federal judge in South Carolina. He assumed senior status on October 1, 1995 and continued to be active at court until his death.

== Death ==
Perry was found dead, aged 89, at his home in Columbia on Sunday July 31, 2011 by a family member. His wife Hallie was reportedly in poor health. He was reported to have died on Friday after attending court that day.

== Honors ==
- 2005, a new federal courthouse in Columbia, South Carolina was named for him.
- A portrait of Perry, painted by South Carolina artist Larry Francis Lebby, hangs in the federal courthouse.
- A parking garage in Columbia, South Carolina bears his name.
- A historical marker in the Waverly Historic District conferred by the South Carolina Department of Archives and History, marks the site of his childhood home.

== See also ==
- List of African-American federal judges
- List of African-American jurists
- List of first minority male lawyers and judges in South Carolina

== Sources ==
- W. Lewis Burke and Belinda F. Gergel, eds. Matthew J. Perry: The Man, His Times, and His Legacy. Introduction by Randall Kennedy ISBN 978-1-57003-534-0. University of South Carolina Press, 2004.

Legal offices
Preceded by Seat established by 92 Stat. 1629	Judge of the United States District Court for the District of South Carolina; 1979–1995	Succeeded by Patrick Michael Duffy
