= Ernest A. Finney Jr. =

American judge (1931–2017)

Chief Justice of South Carolina
- In office December 1994 – March 23, 2000
- Preceded by: A. Lee Chandler
- Succeeded by: Jean H. Toal

Associate Justice of South Carolina
- In office 1985 – December 1994
- Preceded by: Julius B. Ness
- Succeeded by: E. C. Burnett, III

Personal details
- Born: Ernest Adolphus Finney Jr. March 23, 1931 Smithfield, Virginia, U.S.
- Died: December 3, 2017 (aged 86) Columbia, South Carolina, U.S.
- Spouse: Frances Davenport Finney
- Children: 3, including Nikky Finney
- Education: Claflin College (B.A. 1952); South Carolina State University (J.D. 1954)

Ernest Adolphus Finney Jr. (March 23, 1931 – December 3, 2017) was the first African-American Supreme Court Justice appointed to the South Carolina Supreme Court since the Reconstruction Era. He spent the last years of his life in Sumter, South Carolina. He was a member of Alpha Phi Alpha fraternity.

== Early life, education ==
Finney was born in Smithfield, Virginia. His mother died when he was ten days old, so he was raised by his father, Dr. Ernest A. Finney Sr. Finney earned a Bachelor of Arts degree from Claflin College in 1952. He then enrolled in South Carolina State College's School of Law, from which he graduated in 1954.

In the beginning, he was unable to find work as a lawyer, so he followed in his father's footsteps and worked as a teacher. In 1960, he moved to Sumter and began a full-time law practice.

== Legal career ==
In 1961, Finney represented the Friendship 9, a group of black junior college students arrested and charged when trying to desegregate McCrory's lunch counter in Rock Hill, South Carolina.

In 1963, he served as chairman of the South Carolina Commission on Civil Rights. Finney was elected to the South Carolina House of Representatives in 1972. He was subsequently appointed a member of the House Judiciary Committee, making him the first African-American to serve on that key committee in modern times. Finney was one of the founders of the Legislative Black Caucus and served as charter Chairperson from 1973 to 1975.

In May 1994, the state's general assembly elected Ernest Finney to the position of Chief Justice of the State Supreme Court, effective December 1994, making him the first African-American Chief Justice of South Carolina since Reconstruction. In 1976, he won an election to become South Carolina's first black circuit judge. He has been on the state Supreme Court since 1985. Finney retired from the state Supreme Court in 2000 and was named interim president of South Carolina State University in 2002.

In 2015, Finney represented the surviving eight members of the Friendship Nine at the court hearing where their convictions were overturned.

== Awards and legacy ==
Among Finney's other accomplishments are also a position on the National College of State Trial Judges, 1977; Honorary Doctor of Laws Degree, The Citadel & Johnson C. Smith University, 1995; Doctor of Humane Letters, SC State University, 1996; Doctor of Laws, Morris College, 1996; Doctorate, Claflin University; Honoree, S.C. Trial Lawyers Association, 1993; elected and qualified Judge of the Third Judicial Circuit, 1976; and elected and qualified Associate Justice, 1985.

A portrait by artist Larry Francis Lebby was unveiled and is on display in Sumter County.

== Death ==
Finney died on December 3, 2017, at the age of 86 in Columbia, South Carolina, from complications of Alzheimer's disease. Governor Henry McMaster announced that flags would be lowered in the late Justice's honor. On December 8, 2017, Executive Order 2017-40 was filed for that purpose.

== Family ==
Finney's daughter, Nikky Finney, is a poet and professor at the University of South Carolina.

Finney's son Ernest A. Finney III was the solicitor for the state of South Carolina who argued for the state against exoneration of George Stinney Jr.

Finney's son Jerry Finney Sr. owns and operates the Finney Law Firm, Inc., in Columbia. He provides a range of services in a variety of practice areas, including civil litigation, workers' compensation, and probate.

== See also ==
- List of African-American jurists
- List of first minority male lawyers and judges in South Carolina
