= Henry J. Maxwell =

South Carolina state senator & postmaster

Henry Johnson Maxwell
- Born: May 3, 1837; Edisto Island, South Carolina, United States
- Died: August 26, 1906 (aged 69)
- Occupations: South Carolina state senator, lawyer, Union soldier & postmaster
- Relatives: Cassandra E. Maxwell (granddaughter)

Henry Johnson Maxwell (May 3, 1837 – August 26, 1906) was an African-American lawyer, soldier in the Union Army, state senator, and a postmaster in South Carolina.

== Biography ==
Henry Johnson Maxwell was born free on Edisto Island to Stephen J. and Thurston Johnson Maxwell. He was a Sergeant in the 2nd U.S. Colored Artillery. After the war, he worked for the Freedmen's Bureau in Bennettsville, South Carolina as a teacher.

He served in the South Carolina Senate from 1868 until 1877 representing Marlboro County, South Carolina He served as postmaster of Bennettsville in 1869 and 1870, and was the first black postmaster in the United States. He joined the South Carolina Bar in 1871. Towards the end of the Reconstruction era as Democrats regained power, he was charged with bribery and resigned as a state senator. He was never tried.

He was married twice, the second time to Martha Louisa Dibble Maxwell. He helped raise eight children. One of his sons, John Moreau Maxwell, was a store owner in Orangeburg. Another of his sons was attorney Charles W. Maxwell. Henry J. Maxwell's granddaughter Cassandra E. Maxwell became the first female African American lawyer in South Carolina in 1941.

His photograph was included among "Radical" members of the South Carolina Legislature. A historical marker commemorating him is located at the site of his farm in Sumter County.
