= G. Ross Anderson =

American judge (1929–2020)

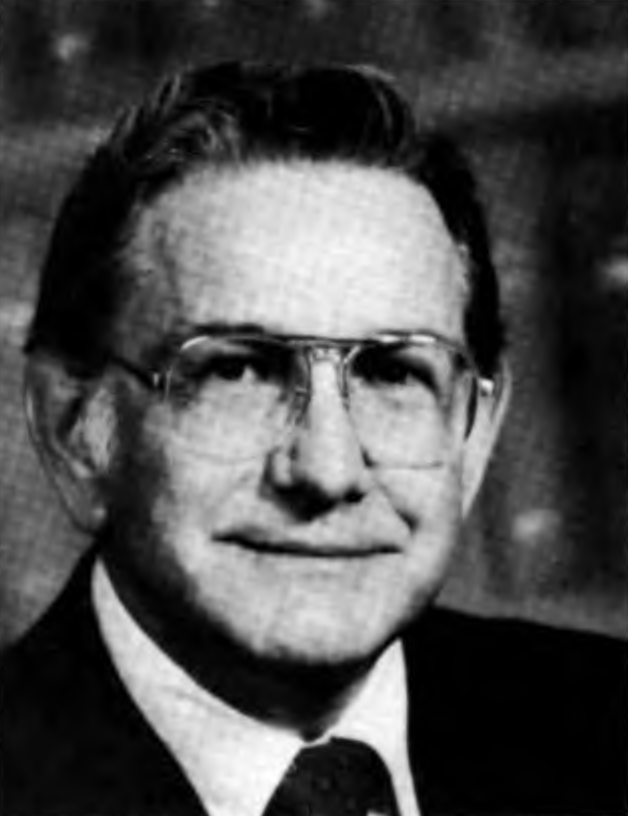

Senior Judge of the United States District Court for the District of South Carolina
- In office January 29, 2009 – March 1, 2016

Judge of the United States District Court for the District of South Carolina
- In office May 23, 1980 – January 29, 2009
- Appointed by: Jimmy Carter
- Preceded by: James Robert Martin Jr.
- Succeeded by: J. Michelle Childs

Member of the South Carolina House of Representatives
- In office 1955–1956

Personal details
- Born: George Ross Anderson Jr. January 29, 1929 Anderson, South Carolina, U.S.
- Died: December 1, 2020 (aged 91)
- Education: Southeastern University (BS); University of South Carolina (LLB); George Washington University

Military service
- Branch/service: United States Air Force
- Battles/wars: Korean War

George Ross Anderson Jr. (January 29, 1929 – December 1, 2020) was an American attorney, politician, and jurist who served as a judge of the United States District Court for the District of South Carolina. After graduating from Southeastern University and George Washington University, Anderson served for a year in the US Air Force during the Korean War. He worked in private legal practice from 1954 and was elected to the South Carolina House of Representatives for a one-year term in 1955. Anderson became a federal judge in 1980, nominated by President Jimmy Carter. He assumed senior status in 2009 and retired in 2016.

== Early life and education ==
Anderson was born in Anderson, South Carolina. His father worked for the Equinox textile mill but forbade his son from working there. Anderson instead had a number of jobs, including delivering newspapers and roofing. He earned his Bachelor of Commercial Science degree from Southeastern University in 1949, studied political science at George Washington University from 1949 to 1951, and received a Bachelor of Laws from the University of South Carolina School of Law in 1954.

== Career ==
He was a legislative assistant to United States Senator Olin D. Johnston from 1947 to 1951 and from 1953 to 1954. He served in the United States Air Force from 1951 to 1952, attaining the rank of Staff Sergeant. He served as a finance instructor and historian to an air wing during the Korean War.

Anderson served in the South Carolina House of Representatives from 1955 to 1956, and practiced law in Anderson from 1954 to 1980. He was unpopular during his single term in the state legislature due to his support for prison expansion. During his career, Anderson was an early fingerprint analyst for the Federal Bureau of Investigation, helped to design the water supply system for Anderson County and arranged for cable television to be installed in the area. Anderson was one of the twelve founders of South Carolina Association for Justice, and its president from 1971 to 1972. They honored him with a lifetime achievement award shortly before he took senior status.

=== Federal judicial service ===
Sponsored by United States Senator Fritz Hollings, Anderson was nominated by President Jimmy Carter on April 18, 1980, to a seat on the United States District Court for the District of South Carolina vacated by Judge James Robert Martin Jr. He was confirmed by the United States Senate on May 21, 1980, and received his commission on May 23, 1980. He assumed senior status on January 29, 2009, his 80th birthday. His service terminated on March 1, 2016, due to his retirement.

== Later life and death ==
A federal courthouse was renamed in honor of Anderson in 2002, a rare honor for a living judge. The student center at Anderson University was named after him in 2015 and was one of his last public appearances. He was awarded the Order of the Palmetto by South Carolina. Anderson suffered declining health in later life and died on December 1, 2020, at a South Carolina nursing home.

Anderson received honorary doctoral degrees from Anderson University, the University of South Carolina, and the Charleston School of Law. He was instrumental in the life of his hometown's Anderson University and served on its Board of Regents. The G. Ross Anderson Student Center was constructed and named in his honor in 2016.

Legal offices
Preceded by James Robert Martin Jr.	Judge of the United States District Court for the District of South Carolina; 1980–2009	Succeeded by J. Michelle Childs
