= Jean H. Toal =

American judge

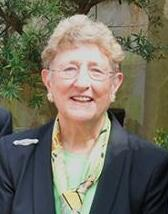
- Toal in 2014

Chief Justice of South Carolina
- In office March 23, 2000 – December 31, 2015
- Preceded by: Ernest A. Finney, Jr.
- Succeeded by: Costa Pleicones

Associate Justice of the South Carolina Supreme Court
- In office March 17, 1988 – March 23, 2000
- Preceded by: George Gregory, Jr.
- Succeeded by: John Cannon Few

Personal details
- Born: Jean Hoefer; August 11, 1943 (age 83) Columbia, South Carolina, U.S.
- Spouse: William Thomas Toal
- Education: Agnes Scott College; University of South Carolina School of Law

Jean Hoefer Toal (born August 11, 1943) is an American former judge who was a chief justice of the Supreme Court of South Carolina. She was the first (and to date, the only) woman and the first Roman Catholic to serve as chief justice. In 2013, she became the first chief justice on the Supreme Court of South Carolina since the 1800s to have an opponent run against her. Toal has continued to serve in the judiciary as a senior judge since her retirement from the Supreme Court.

== Biography ==
=== Early life ===
Jean Hoefer was born on August 11, 1943, in Columbia, South Carolina, the daughter of Herbert W. and Lilla Farrell Hoefer. She married William Thomas Toal, and they have two children. She graduated from Agnes Scott College in 1965 and the University of South Carolina School of Law in 1968, where she was Managing Editor of the South Carolina Law Review.

=== Early career and tenure on the Supreme Court of South Carolina ===
When she graduated, she was one of 11 women in South Carolina actively practicing the law. As a lawyer, she argued before the United States Supreme Court on behalf of the Catawba Nation. In 1975, she was elected to the South Carolina House, representing Richland County as a Democrat. She was a statehouse representative for 13 years before being elected to the South Carolina Supreme Court in 1988 and sworn in on March 17, 1988, the first woman elected to this position. She was reelected over Tom Ervin in 1996.

Toal was elected chief justice in 2000, and served until December 31, 2015, after reaching the mandatory retirement age for judges in South Carolina. In 2013, she was the first chief justice of the Supreme Court of South Carolina not to run unopposed in the election since the 1800s. Her opponent was Justice Costa Pleciones. She took part in a number of landmark cases. In 2000, she chose to use the internet to organize court records instead of mainframe computers, a first in South Carolina. She served as the President of the Conference of Chief Justices from July 2007 to July 2008.

=== Life after the Supreme Court of South Carolina ===
Toal oversaw the court cases involving Santee Cooper following the Nukegate scandal. She was required to sign off Santee Cooper's $520 million settlement with ratepayers. She has also overseen all asbestos-related litigation in South Carolina since leaving the South Carolina Supreme Court. She is the subject of Madam Chief Justice, a collection of essays about Toal which span her career.

In December 2023, it was announced that Toal would take over all matters regarding the high-profile conviction of Alex Murdaugh. On January 29, 2024, Toal denied Murdaugh's motion for a new trial.

== See also ==
- List of female state supreme court justices
