= Carol Connor =

American supreme court judge (1950–2004)

- Born: 1950; Kingstree
- Died: February 20, 2004 (aged 53–54)
- Alma mater: Joseph F. Rice School of Law
- Occupation: Judge
- Position held: circuit judge, supreme court judge (1984–)

Carol Connor (1950 – February 20, 2004) was the first female circuit court, first appeal court, and first supreme court judge in South Carolina.

Connor was born in Kingstree, South Carolina in 1950. She received her juris doctor at the University of South Carolina School of Law in 1976. Connor married Attorney and state legislator Palmer Freeman.

She became the first female judge for the South Carolina Circuit Court in 1988 for Richland and Kershaw counties. In 1993, she became the first woman judge on the South Carolina Court of Appeals. In 1984, she became the first woman to be an acting justice on the South Carolina Supreme Court.

On February 20, 2004, Connor died of breast cancer.
