= George Hearn (disambiguation) =

George Hearn (born 1934) is an actor and singer.

George Hearn or Hearne may also refer to:

- George Hearn (bishop) (1935–2022), Anglican bishop of Rockhampton
- George M. Hearn (born 1951), American attorney and former member of the South Carolina House of Representatives
- George Hearne Sr (1829–1904), English cricketer, the father of George Gibbons Hearne
- George Alfred Lawrence Hearne (1888–1978), South African Test cricketer, the son of George Gibbons Hearne
- George Francis Hearne (1851–1931), English cricketer
- George Gibbons Hearne (1856–1932), Test cricketer who played for England and South Africa, the son of George Hearne and father of George Alfred Lawrence Hearne
