= Frank Hearne =

English cricketer

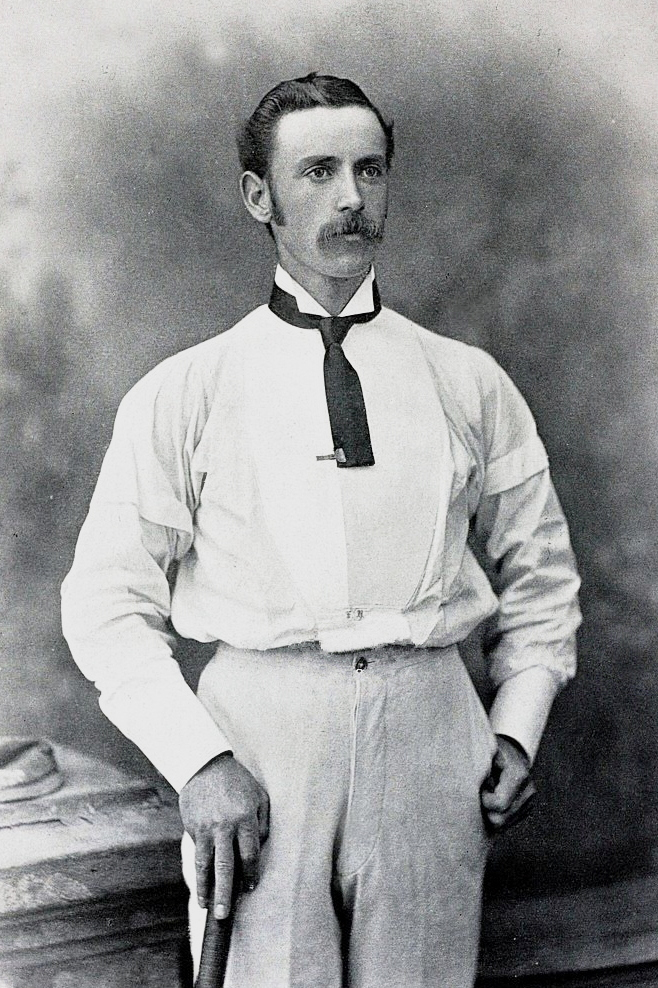
- Hearne in about 1895

Personal information
- Born: 23 November 1858; Ealing, Middlesex
- Died: 14 July 1949 (aged 90); Cape Town, South Africa
- Height: 5 ft 5 in (1.65 m)
- Batting: Right-handed
- Bowling: Right-arm round-arm fast
- Relatives: George Hearne (father); George Gibbons Hearne (brother); Alec Hearne (brother); George Alfred Lawrence Hearne (son); Other family

International information
- National sides: England (1889); South Africa (1892–1896)
- Test debut: 12 March 1889; England v South Africa
- Last Test: 2 April 1896; South Africa v England

Domestic team information
- Years: Team
- 1879–1889: Kent
- 1889/90–1903/04: Western Province

Career statistics
Competition	Test	First-class
Matches	6	161
Runs scored	168	4,760
Batting average	16.80	17.96
100s/50s	0/0	4/21
Top score	30	144
Balls bowled	62	2,904
Wickets	2	57
Bowling average	20.00	23.61
5 wickets in innings	0	1
10 wickets in match	0	0
Best bowling	2/40	5/47
Catches/stumpings	3/–	111/–
- Source: CricInfo, 26 October 2017

Frank Hearne (23 November 1858 – 14 July 1949) was an English born cricketer. One of the few men to play Test cricket for more than one country, he played for both England and South Africa. He was a member of the Hearne family of cricketers who played first-class cricket between 1879 and 1904 for Kent County Cricket Club and Western Province.

== Early life ==
Hearne was born on 23 November 1858 in Ealing in what was then Middlesex. His father, George Hearne, had played for Middlesex and became the groundsman at Kent's Private Banks Sports Ground in Catford where Frank worked as a young man. He was also on the MCC ground staff at Lord's. His brothers, George and Alec, both also played for Kent.

== Cricketing career ==
Hearne made his first-class cricket debut for Kent in June 1879, playing against MCC at Lord's. He was awarded his county cap in 1885 and played 125 first-class matches for the county before emigrating to South Africa after the 1889 English cricket season due to ill-health. In South Africa, Hearne played mainly for Western Province, making 11 first-class appearances for the team and playing in the Champion Bat Tournament in 1890/91 and the Currie Cup from 1892/93 to 1903/04.

He toured South Africa in 1888/89 with an England team managed by RG Warton. He played in both of the matches on the tour which were later given Test match status, making his Test debut at Port Elizabeth.

After emigrating to South Africa he played for South Africa against England when Walter Read took a team to the country in 1891/92, making his debut for South Africa at Cape Town in March 1892 in the only Test match on the tour. His two brothers, George and Alec were on the opposing team making their only Test appearances for an England team. Hearne went on to play three more Test matches for South Africa, all against Lord Hawke's team which toured in 1895/96. He toured England with South Africa in 1894 on a tour when no matches were given first-class status.

Hearne was considered to be a "solid batsman" who was effective when defending his wicket but who also possessed "a range of attacking shots", particularly on the off-side. He was described in Wisden in 1907 as "a brilliant bat and magnificent field who did many good performances for his county". He was in the Kent team which beat the touring Australians in 1884 and scored 111 for the South of England against Australia in 1886. Batting with his brother George, he was part of a Kent partnership of 226 for the second wicket at Gravesend against Middlesex in the same year, scoring 142 runs himself. He made his highest individual score, 144 runs, the following season against Yorkshire and scored four first-class centuries in his career.

== Later life ==
Hearne's son, George Alfred Lawrence Hearne was born in Catford in 1884 and played cricket for Western Province. He made three Test match appearances for South Africa.

Hearne set up a sports shop when he emigrated to South Africa and also coached cricket. He umpired in six Test matches in South Africa between 1899 and 1906. He died at Mowbray, Cape Town in 1949 aged 90.

== See also ==
- List of cricketers who have played for more than one international team
