= Frederick Burton (English cricketer) =

English cricketer (1885–1978)

Personal information
- Full name: Frederick Alfred Burton
- Born: 28 September 1885; Islington, Middlesex, England
- Died: 7 January 1978 (aged 92); Weston-super-Mare, Somerset, England
- Batting: Right-handed
- Bowling: Right-arm medium-fast
- Relatives: George Burton (father); George Hearne (father-in-law)

Domestic team information
- Years: Team
- 1924: Minor Counties
- 1921–1925: Marylebone Cricket Club
- 1910–1932: Hertfordshire

Career statistics
Competition	First-class
Matches	7
Runs scored	99
Batting average	12.37
100s/50s	–/–
Top score	35*
Balls bowled	1,116
Wickets	11
Bowling average	51.27
5 wickets in innings	–
10 wickets in match	–
Best bowling	4/101
Catches/stumpings	–/–
- Source: Cricinfo, 14 December 2014

Frederick Alfred Burton (28 December 1885 – 7 January 1978) was an English cricketer active from the early 1910s to the early 1930s. A right-handed batsman and right-arm medium-fast bowler, Burton played in half a dozen first-class cricket matches, but was mostly associated with Hertfordshire in minor counties cricket. The son of first-class cricketer George Burton, he was born at Islington, Middlesex, and died at Weston-super-Mare, Somerset. His father-in-law was George Hearne of the Hearne family.

== Cricket career ==
Burton made his debut for Hertfordshire against the Surrey Second XI in the 1910 Minor Counties Championship, with him featuring in 43 Minor Counties Championship matches before the suspension of county cricket in September 1914 due to the First World War.

He resumed his minor counties career with Hertfordshire following the conclusion of the war. He made his debut in first-class cricket for the Marylebone Cricket Club (MCC) in 1921, playing two matches at Lord's against Cambridge University and Oxford University. He appeared in first-class cricket for the MCC the following season against Cambridge University, while in 1924 he was selected to represent a combined Minor Counties cricket team against HDG Leveson-Gower's XI. Two further first-class matches for the MCC followed in 1925, against Wales and Oxford University, before playing in a final first-class match for the East of England against the touring New Zealanders in 1927. In seven first-class matches, Burton scored 99 runs at an average of 12.37, with a high score of 35 not out, while with the ball he took 11 wickets, averaging 51.27 per wicket, with best figures of 4/101. His minor counties career with Hertfordshire ended in 1932, by which time he had appeared in 171 Minor Counties Championship matches.

Besides playing, Burton also stood as an umpire in eight first-class matches between 1922 and 1930.

== See also ==
- Hearne family
