= Hearne family =

English cricketing family

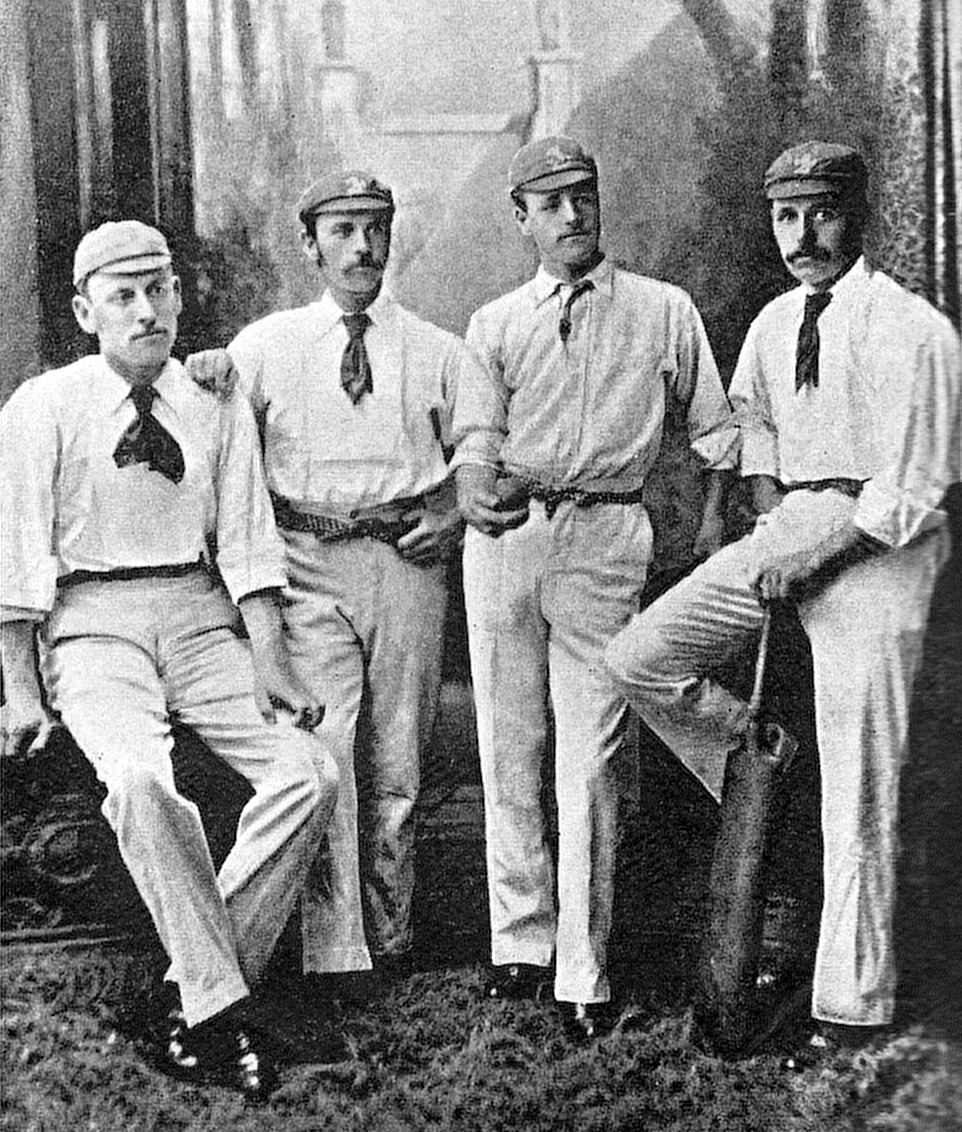
Members of the Hearne family from l-r Walter Hearne, Frank Hearne, Alec Hearne, George Gibbons Hearne

The Hearne family was a notable English cricketing family. Thirteen members of the family played first-class cricket, including five for Kent County Cricket Club and five for Middlesex County Cricket Club. Six played Test cricket: four for England, one for South Africa, and one represented both England and South Africa. Three members of the family were awarded the distinction of being names as Wisden Cricketers of the Year, J.T. Hearne in 1892, Alec Hearne in 1894 and J.W. Hearne in 1912. Other members also made notable contributions to the game.

== Family members ==
- Tom Hearne (1826–1900), (brother of George Hearne), played for Marylebone Cricket Club (MCC) (1857–1876), Middlesex (1859–1875)
- George Hearne (1829–1904), (brother of Tom Hearne), played for Middlesex (1861–1868)
- George Francis Hearne (1851–1931), (son of Tom Hearne), played once for MCC in 1882. He became the long-serving MCC pavilion clerk at Lord's
- George Gibbons Hearne (1856-1932), (son of George Hearne), played for Kent (1875–1895) and made one Test match appearance for England cricket team in 1891/92)
- Frank Hearne (1858-1949), (son of George Hearne), played for Kent (1879–1889), MCC (1882–1889), Western Province (1889/90-1903/04). Made two Test match appearances for England in 1888/89 and four appearances for South Africa between 1891/92 and 1895/96)
- William Hearne (1860–1916), (eldest brother of Herbert Hearne, Walter Hearne and Jack T Hearne), played for Middlesex Second XI (1907–1908)
- Herbert Hearne (1862–1906), (brother of William Hearne, Walter Hearne and Jack T Hearne), played for Kent (1884–1886)
- Alec Hearne (1863–1952), (son of George Hearne), played for Kent (1884–1906), MCC (1888–1910) and one Test for England (1891/92). He was a leading all-rounder for Kent, retiring as the leading wicket-taker and run-scorer in the history of the club. Wisden Cricketer of the Year in 1894
- Walter Hearne (1864–1925), (brother of William Hearne, Herbert Hearne and Jack T Hearne), played for Kent (1887–1896)
- J.T.Hearne, known as Jack, (1867–1944), (brother of William Hearne, Herbert Hearne and Walter Hearne; and cousin to J.W.Hearne), played for Middlesex (1888–1923) and for England in 11 Tests between 1891 and 1899. Wisden Cricketer of the Year in 1892
- Thomas John Hearne (1887–1947), (son of George Francis Hearne, grandson of Thomas Hearne), played for Middlesex (1908) and Berkshire
- George Alfred Lawrence Hearne (1888–1978), (son of Frank Hearne and grandson of George Hearne), played for Western Province (1910/11-1926/27) and made one Test match appearance for South Africa in 1923/24
- J.W.Hearne, known as Young Jack, (1891–1965), (cousin of J.T. Hearne), played for MCC (1910/11-1935), Middlesex (1909–1936) and made 24 Test appearances for England between 1911/12 and 1926. Wisden Cricketer of the Year in 1912
- Eric William Sturgess (1920–2004), (grandson of Herbert Hearne), played for Air Force XI (1942–1943)

== Extended family ==
- George Burton (1851-1930), father of Frederick Burton. Played for Middlesex (1881–1893) and MCC (1883–1892)
- Frederick Burton (1885–1978), son of George Burton, son-in-law of George Francis Hearne. Played for MCC (1921–1925) and Minor Counties (1924)

== Family tree ==
T.Hearne	G.Hearne	J.T.Hearne	W.Hearne	H.Hearne	J.W.Hearne
G.Burton	G.F.Hearne	A.Hearne	F.Hearne	G.G.Hearne	E.Hearne
F.A.Burton	T.J.Hearne	G.A.L.Hearne	E.W.Sturgess

== See also ==
- List of Test or One-day International cricket families
