= Thomas Hearne (cricketer, born 1887) =

English cricketer

Personal information
- Full name: Thomas John Hearne
- Born: 3 July 1887; Ealing, Middlesex, England
- Died: 25 May 1947 (aged 59); Poole, Dorset, England
- Batting: Left-handed
- Bowling: Left-arm medium pace
- Role: All-rounder
- Relatives: Thomas Hearne (grandfather), George Hearne (father)

Domestic team information
- Years: Team
- 1908: Middlesex

Career statistics
| Competition | FC |
|---|---|
| Matches | 1 |
| Runs scored | n/a |
| Batting average | n/a |
| 100s/50s | n/a |
| Top score | n/a |
| Catches/stumpings | n/a |
- Source: ESPNcricinfo, 3 April 2024

Thomas John Hearne (3 July 1887 – 25 May 1947) was an English first-class cricketer who played one match for Middlesex, in which he did not bat or bowl.

== Career ==
A member of the famous Hearne cricketing family, Hearne was the son of George Francis Hearne, and the grandson of Thomas Hearne, and was related to five Test cricketers. He made his debut for the Middlesex Second XI in a match against the Kent Second XI in 1906 at Lord's, taking four wickets. Hearne was selected to play for Middlesex in a first-class match against the touring Gentlemen of Philadelphia, held at Lord's in July 1908, as a late replacement for his cousin, J. T. Hearne. Scheduled as a three-day game, the match was completed in one day, with Hearne absent for the entire match. Hearne made one further appearance for the Middlesex Second XI, in 1909 against the Kent Second XI at the Old County Ground in West Malling, but did not play any further first-class games. After the conclusion of the First World War, Hearne began playing in the Minor Counties Cricket Championship with Berkshire, representing the county in eight matches during the 1922 and 1923 cricket seasons. His best performance for Berkshire was against Cornwall in August 1922, when he took 6/44 in Cornwall's first innings and nine wickets for the match. Hearne died in Poole, Dorset, in 1947, at the age of 59.
