= Thomas Hearne =

Thomas Hearn or Hearne may refer to:

- Thomas K. Hearn (1937–2008), American academic administrator
- Thomas Hearne (antiquarian) (1678–1735), English scholar
- Thomas Hearne (artist) (1744–1817), English landscape painter
- Thomas Hearne (cricketer, born 1887) (1887–1947), English cricketer
- Thomas Hearne (racing driver) (born 1940), Argentine racing driver
- Tom Hearne (1826–1900), English cricketer
