= Gary Hill (judge) =

American judge (born 1964)

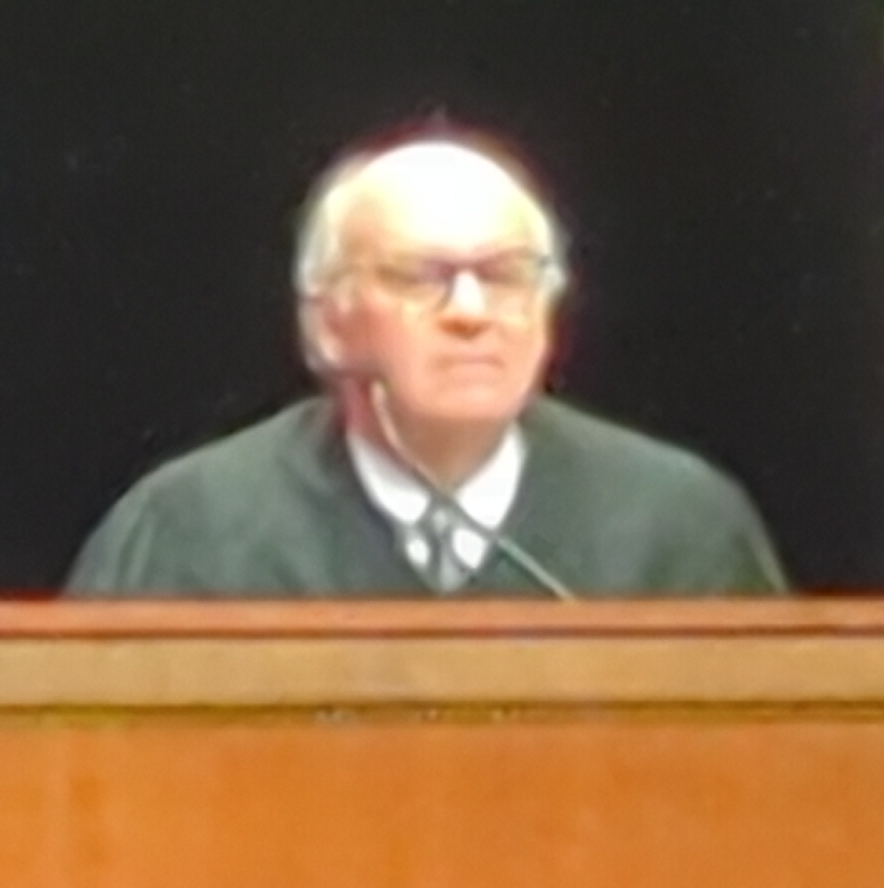

Justice of the South Carolina Supreme Court
- Incumbent
- Assumed office February 9, 2023
- Preceded by: Kaye Gorenflo Hearn

Personal details
- Born: David Garrison Hill; July 14, 1964 (age 62) Greenville, South Carolina, U.S.
- Education: Wofford College (BA); University of South Carolina (JD)

David Garrison Hill (born July 14, 1964) is a justice of the South Carolina Supreme Court. He previously served as a judge of the South Carolina Court of Appeals from 2017 to 2023.

== Early life and education ==
Hill was born on July 14, 1964 in Greenville, South Carolina He received a Bachelor of Arts from Wofford College in 1986 and a Juris Doctor from the University of South Carolina Law School in 1989.

== Career ==
After graduating law school, Hill served as a law clerk to Judge William Walter Wilkins of the United States Court of Appeals for the Fourth Circuit. From 1990 to 2000, he was a member of Hill, Wyatt & Bannister in Greenville. In 2000, he started Hill & Hill, LLC with his father. From 2004 to 2017, he served as a resident circuit judge for the Thirteenth Circuit. In 2016, he was one of five candidates to fill a vacancy on the court of appeals. On February 1, 2017, he was elected by the South Carolina General Assembly in a 148–0 vote to serve as a judge of the South Carolina Court of Appeals, James E Lockemy.

=== South Carolina Supreme Court ===
On February 8, 2023, he was elected by the General Assembly to serve as a justice of the South Carolina Supreme Court in a 140–0 vote. He replaced retired Justice Kaye Gorenflo Hearn, making the South Carolina Supreme Court the only state supreme court in the country without a female justice until the election of Justice Letitia H. Verdin in June 2024.

Legal offices
Preceded by Kaye Gorenflo Hearn	Justice of the South Carolina Supreme Court; 2023–present	Incumbent
