= George Gibbons Hearne =

English cricketer (1856–1932)

George Hearne
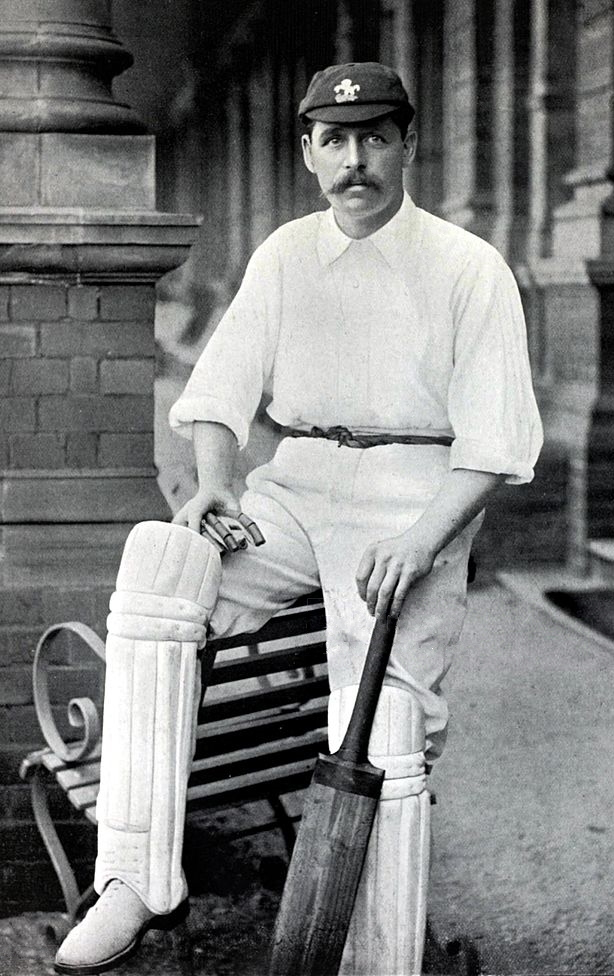
- Hearne in about 1895

Personal information
- Born: 7 July 1856; Ealing, Middlesex
- Died: 13 February 1932 (aged 75); Denmark Hill, London
- Batting: Left-handed
- Bowling: Left-arm round-arm medium
- Relatives: George Hearne (father); Frank Hearne (brother); Alec Hearne (brother); Other family

International information
- National side: England
- Only Test: 19 March 1892 v South Africa

Domestic team information
- Years: Team
- 1875–1895: Kent
- 1877–1903: MCC

Career statistics
Competition	Test	First-class
Matches	1	328
Runs scored	0	9,022
Batting average	0.00	17.51
100s/50s	0/0	5/40
Top score	0	126
Balls bowled	0	32,818
Wickets	–	686
Bowling average	–	16.76
5 wickets in innings	–	41
10 wickets in match	–	12
Best bowling	–	8/21
Catches/stumpings	0/–	215/–
- Source: CricInfo, 28 October 2017

George Gibbons Hearne (7 July 1856 – 13 February 1932) was an English professional cricketer who played first-class cricket for Kent County Cricket Club between 1875 and 1895. He also played in one Test match for England against South Africa in 1891/92. Hearne was part of the famous cricketing Hearne family. His brothers Alec and Frank also played Test match cricket.

== Early life ==
Hearne was born on 7 July 1856 in Ealing in what was then Middlesex. His father, George Hearne, had played for Middlesex and became the groundsman at Kent's Private Banks Sports Ground in Catford in 1872. His brothers, Frank and Alec, both also played for Kent. George's mother was Mary Gibbons, the daughter of a Devon farmer.

== Cricket career ==
Hearne made his first-class cricket debut for Kent in 1875 at the age of 19 at Catford. In 1876 he was engaged on the staff at Prince's Cricket Ground and in 1877 on the Lord's ground staff where he would remain until 1901. He worked with his father preparing cricket grounds during the winter and opened a sports outfitter's in Lewisham.

In all he played for Kent for 21 seasons, making over 250 times for Kent as well as making 49 first-class appearances for MCC. He was awarded his county cap in 1885 and a benefit season in 1890. His final match for Kent was in 1895, although he continued to play sporadically for MCC until 1903 in first-class cricket and his last recorded match for the club was in 1915.

Primarily a bowler in the early years of his career, he took 686 wickets for Kent at an average of 17 runs per wicket. He bowled left-arm fast-medium using a round arm action a moved the ball from the leg-side to the off-side, resulting in many dismissals caught in the slips. In his later career he developed his batting more effectively and became a "genuine all-rounder", making 1,000 runs in 1886, 987 of them for Kent.

His top score of 126 was made at Gravesend that season against Middlesex and included a partnership of 226 runs with his brother Frank. He played in the Kent team that beat the touring Australians in 1884 and took eight wickets in an innings on multiple occasions.

=== International cricket ===
Hearne was chosen to tour South Africa as part of Walter Read's XI in 1891–1892. The tour took place at the same time as another team, captained by W G Grace, were representing England against Australia. The sole first-class match on the tour was against a South African XI and this match was retrospectively given Test match status. He scored just nine runs in the Test match but acquitted himself well on the tour in general.

In the Test match, played at Newlands Cricket Ground in Cape Town, Hearne played on the same team as his brother Alec and cousin John Thomas Hearne. His other brother Frank played for the South African team, having previously played for England.

== Family and later life ==
Hearne married Mary Jane Strawn, the daughter of a Joseph Sharon, a coachman, on 12 March 1881. Mary died in 1916, after which George moved in with his unmarried daughter, Mabel. Hearne died at King's College Hospital at Denmark Hill in London in 1932 of bronchitis and influenza in 1932. He was 75.
