= Kaye Gorenflo Hearn =

American judge (born 1950)

Justice of the South Carolina Supreme Court
- In office January 14, 2010 – December 31, 2022
- Appointed by: South Carolina General Assembly
- Preceded by: John H. Waller
- Succeeded by: D. Garrison Hill

Personal details
- Born: January 30, 1950 (age 76)
- Spouse: George M. Hearn
- Education: Bethany College (BA); University of South Carolina (JD); University of Virginia (LLM)

Kaye Gorenflo Hearn (born January 30, 1950) is a former justice of the South Carolina Supreme Court. She served on the court from 2010 to 2022.

== Education and career ==
Hearn is a graduate of Bethany College, the University of South Carolina School of Law, and the University of Virginia School of Law. Following her graduation from law school, Hearn clerked for Justice Julius B. Ness of the South Carolina Supreme Court and then practiced law in Horry County, South Carolina. Prior to her service on the Supreme Court, Hearn was elected to the South Carolina Family Court and was the chief judge of the South Carolina Court of Appeals. Hearn retired from the court on December 31, 2022.

=== Recognition ===
Hearn also holds honorary degrees from institutions including the Charleston School of Law, Francis Marion University, and the University of South Carolina.

== Personal life ==
Her husband, George M. Hearn, is a former member of the legislature and a family law attorney in town.

Legal offices
Preceded by John H. Waller	Justice of the South Carolina Supreme Court; 2010–2022	Succeeded by D. Garrison Hill
