= Walter Hearne =

English cricketer

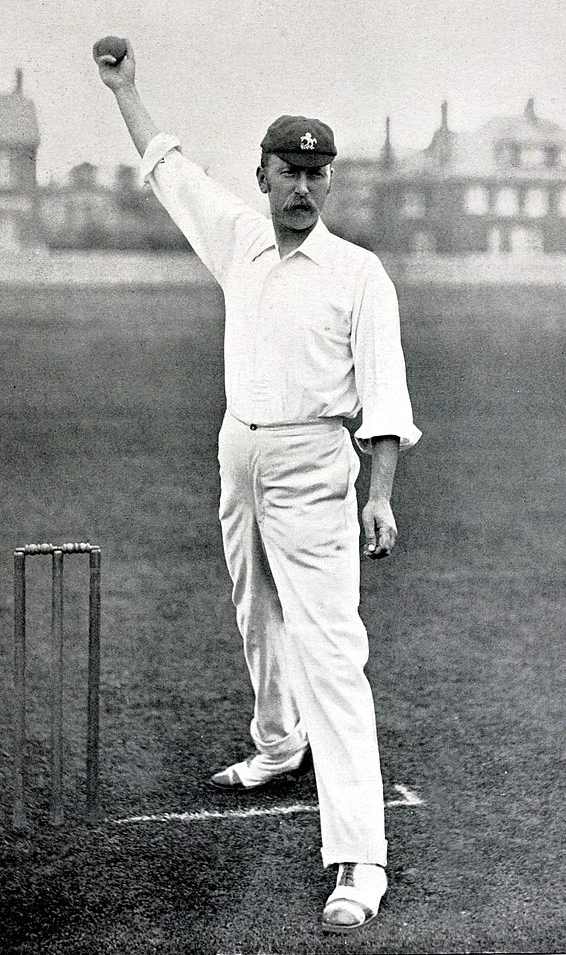
- Hearne in about 1895

Personal information
- Full name: Walter Hearne
- Born: 15 January 1864; Chalfont St Giles, Buckinghamshire
- Died: 2 April 1925 (aged 61); Canterbury, Kent
- Batting: Right-handed
- Bowling: Right-arm medium
- Relatives: J.T. Hearne (brother); Herbert Hearne (brother); Other family

Domestic team information
- Years: Team
- 1887–1896: Kent
- FC debut: 16 May 1887 Kent v MCC
- Last FC: 30 May 1896 Kent v Yorkshire

Career statistics
| Competition | First-class |
|---|---|
| Matches | 55 |
| Runs scored | 553 |
| Batting average | 7.57 |
| 100s/50s | 0/0 |
| Top score | 34* |
| Balls bowled | 10.958 |
| Wickets | 273 |
| Bowling average | 15.93 |
| 5 wickets in innings | 28 |
| 10 wickets in match | 10 |
| Best bowling | 8/40 |
| Catches/stumpings | 23/– |
- Source: CricInfo, 11 August 2010

Walter Hearne (15 January 1864 – 2 April 1925) was an English professional cricketer for Kent County Cricket Club towards the end of the 19th century. He played primarily as a bowler but suffered from injuries and his career was cut short as a result. He was the elder brother of the great Middlesex bowler J. T. Hearne who played for England in Test cricket whilst his older brother, Herbert Hearne, also played for Kent. He was a member of the extended Hearne family.

== Early life and family ==
Hearne was born at Chalfont St Giles in Buckinghamshire in 1864, the son of William Hearne who was considered a good local cricketer. Part of the extended Hearne family, Hearne and his brothers played cricket – he and Herbert for Kent and Jack and oldest brother William for Middlesex, although William only played for the Second XI. Three cousins played Test cricket as did Jack.

== Cricket career ==
Hearne was a medium-paced right-arm bowler who, similar to his brother Jack bowled with great accuracy and a pronounced off-break. He made his first-class cricket debut for Kent in 1887, playing six matches in what was described as a "trial" period and did not appear for the county against until 1890 before becoming a regular member of the Kent team only in 1892.

Most of Walter Hearne's first-class cricket was played between 1892 and 1894, although a knee injury limited his appearances during 1893 to just six matches. He took 15 wickets against Lancashire at Old Trafford in 1893 and in 1894 completed a hat-trick against the same team. During the 1894 season he took 116 first-class wickets, 99 of them in county matches, including a series of three matches in July when he took 13/61 against Gloucestershire, 12/72 against Nottinghamshire and 13/98 against Surrey – a total of 38 wickets for 231 runs. His 116 wickets were taken at an average of 13.29 and followed returns of 93 and 46 wickets in the previous two seasons.

At the beginning of the 1895 season Walter Hearne's knee failed and he was unable to play a first-class match during the season – although he was able to play in few non-first-class matches for MCC. He seemed fit at the start of the 1896 season but in his third match against Yorkshire at Leeds his knee "gave way so badly" that he was forced to retire from cricket, surgery proving ineffective.

== Later life ==
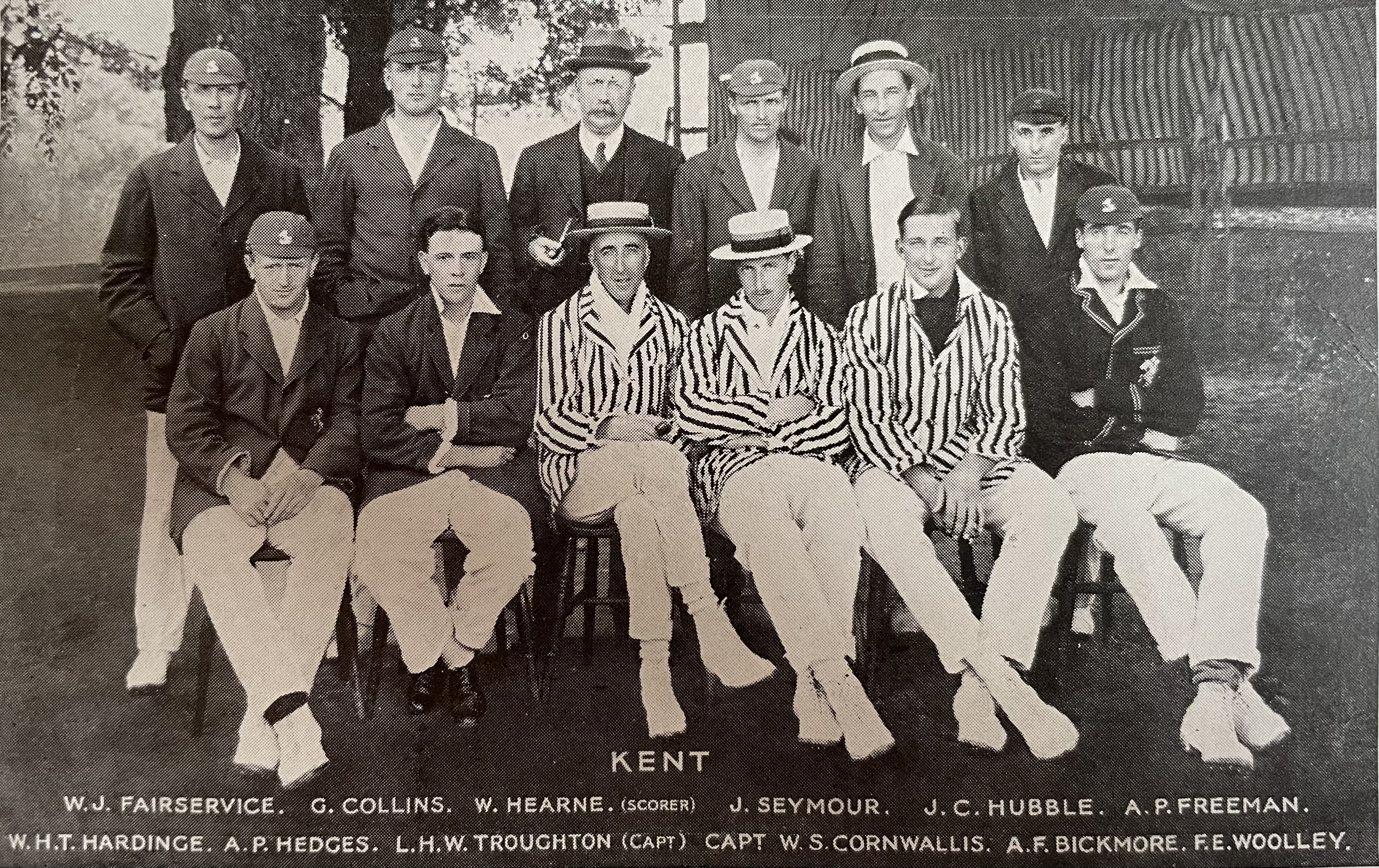
Hearne with the Kent team of about 1922

Hearne took on the role of official scorer for Kent after his retirement, retaining the post for the rest of his life. He scored in each Kent's four County Championship winning teams between 1906 and 1913 and resumed the role after the First World War. He died at Canterbury in Kent in 1925 aged 61, his cousin Alec Hearne taking over the role of scorer.
