= George Hearne Sr =

English cricketer

George Hearne (15 May 1829 – 9 December 1904) was an English cricketer.

Hearne was born at Chalfont St Peter in Buckinghamshire. He played for a Middlesex XI (1861–1863) and for Middlesex County Cricket Club (1864–1868) as a batsman. In 1872 he moved to be the groundsman at Kent County Cricket Club's Private Banks Sports Ground at Catford.

He and his brother Tom headed a famous cricketing dynasty. His sons George Gibbons Hearne, Frank Hearne and Alec Hearne all played Test cricket and for Kent County Cricket Club and his grandson George Alfred Lawrence Hearne played Test cricket for South Africa. He died at Rushey Green in Catford in 1904, aged 75.
