= George M. Hearn =

American politician

George M. Hearn, Jr.

Member of the South Carolina House of Representatives from the 105th district
- In office 2009–2013
- Preceded by: Billy Witherspoon
- Succeeded by: Kevin Hardee

Personal details
- Born: October 28, 1951 (age 74) Charlotte, North Carolina, U.S.A.
- Party: Republican
- Spouse: Kaye Gorenflo (m. 1979)
- Education: Duke University (BA); University of South Carolina (JD)
- Profession: Lawyer

George M. Hearn, Jr. (born October 28, 1951) is an American lawyer and politician. From 2009 through 2013, he served as a member of the South Carolina House of Representatives from the 105th District, representing parts of Horry County, South Carolina. He lives in Conway, South Carolina where he owns his own law firm and is a member of the Republican party. Hearn did not seek reelection in 2012 in order to spend more time at home. His wife is South Carolina Supreme Court Justice Kaye G. Hearn.
