= George Burton (cricketer) =

English cricketer

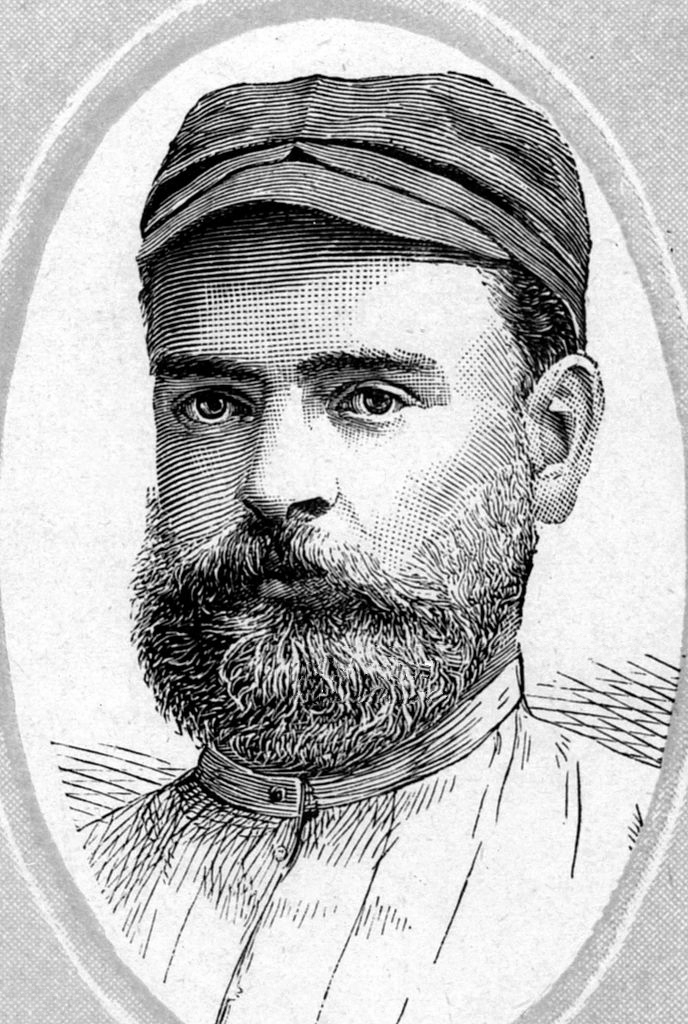
George Burton

George Burton (1 May 1851 – 7 May 1930) was an English cricketer. He was born at Hampstead, London and died at Covent Garden.

He began in North London club cricket, before appearing with the Middlesex Colts in 1875. He made his first-class cricket debut for Middlesex County Cricket Club in 1881 and played in 111 matches until 1893. From 1883 until 1904 he was a member of the Marylebone Cricket Club (MCC) groundstaff and appeared in several matches between 1883 and 1892. He took 608 wickets at an average of 17.18, with a personal best of 10/59. He was awarded two benefit matches at Lord's in 1892 and 1905. He acted as the official scorer for Middlesex for a number of years and also stood as a first-class umpire between 1898 and 1899.

By occupation he was a master coachsmith. His son Frederick Alfred (1885–1978) also played cricket for Hertfordshire and MCC, and married a daughter of Herbert Hearne.
