= Herbert Hearne =

English cricketer

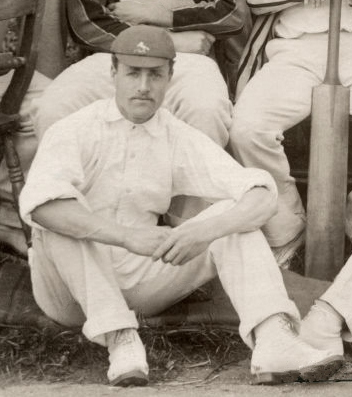
- Hearne in 1888

Personal information
- Full name: Herbert Hearne
- Born: 15 March 1862; Chalfont St Giles, Buckinghamshire
- Died: 13 June 1906 (aged 44); Chalfont St Giles, Buckinghamshire
- Batting: Right-handed
- Bowling: Right-arm fast
- Relatives: J.T. Hearne (brother); Walter Hearne (brother); Other family

Domestic team information
- Years: Team
- 1884–1886: Kent
- FC debut: 26 May 1884 Kent v Hampshire
- Last FC: 12 August 1886 Kent v Middlesex

Career statistics
Competition	First-class
Matches	25
Runs scored	252
Batting average	9.33
100s/50s	0/0
Top score	36
Balls bowled	3,129
Wickets	57
Bowling average	24.82
5 wickets in innings	3
10 wickets in match	0
Best bowling	5/27
Catches/stumpings	16/–
- Source: CricInfo, 30 October 2017

Herbert Hearne (15 March 1862 – 13 June 1906) was an English professional cricketer. He was born at Chalfont St Giles in Buckinghamshire, the son of William Hearne who was considered a good local cricketer.

== Career ==
He played first-class cricket for Kent County Cricket Club as a fast bowler and right-handed batsman between 1884 and 1886. After being awarded his county cap in 1885 and making 25 appearances for Kent, he was forced the retire from cricket due to injury. He made one appearance for Shropshire County Cricket Club in a non-first-class match in 1893 while club professional for Newbold Royal and also played for Buckinghamshire. He was a member of the extended Hearne family of cricketers, his brothers J.T.Hearne and Walter Hearne being better known.

== Death ==
Hearne died at Chalfont St Giles in 1906 aged 44.
