= George Alfred Lawrence Hearne =

English-born South African cricketer (1888–1978)

George Hearne
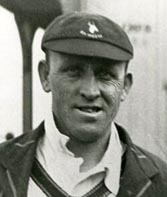

Personal information
- Born: 27 March 1888; Catford, Kent
- Died: 13 November 1978 (aged 90); Barberton, South Africa
- Batting: Right-handed
- Role: Wicket-keeper
- Relatives: Frank Hearne (father); Other family

International information
- National side: South Africa
- Test debut: 23 December 1922 v England
- Last Test: 16 August 1924 v England

Career statistics
Competition	Test	First-class
Matches	3	41
Runs scored	59	1,981
Batting average	11.80	28.30
100s/50s	0/0	2/10
Top score	28	138
Balls bowled	–	714
Wickets	–	14
Bowling average	–	28.64
5 wickets in innings	–	0
10 wickets in match	–	0
Best bowling	–	3/9
Catches/stumpings	3/0	38/2
- Source: CricInfo, 28 October 2017

George Alfred Lawrence Hearne (27 March 1888 – 13 November 1978) was an English born South African cricketer who played Test cricket.

Hearne was born in Catford in Kent and emigrated to the Cape Colony with his family in 1889. His father, Frank Hearne was a professional cricketer who played Test cricket for both England and South Africa and who was a member of the Hearne family of cricketers. He had played for Kent County Cricket Club and emigrated due to ill-health to take up a coaching position with Western Province.

George Hearne played first-class cricket as a right-handed batsman and wicket-keeper for Western Province between 1910/11 and 1926/27 and played in three Test matches for South Africa between 1922/23 and 1924. He made his Test debut against England in December 1922 at Johannesburg, playing two matches during the 1922/23 tour. Hearne then toured England with South Africa in 1924, playing his last Test match in the final Test of the series at The Oval.

Hearne died in Barberton, South Africa in 1978, aged 90.
