= Western Province Cricket Association =

Governing body for cricket in the Cape Town region

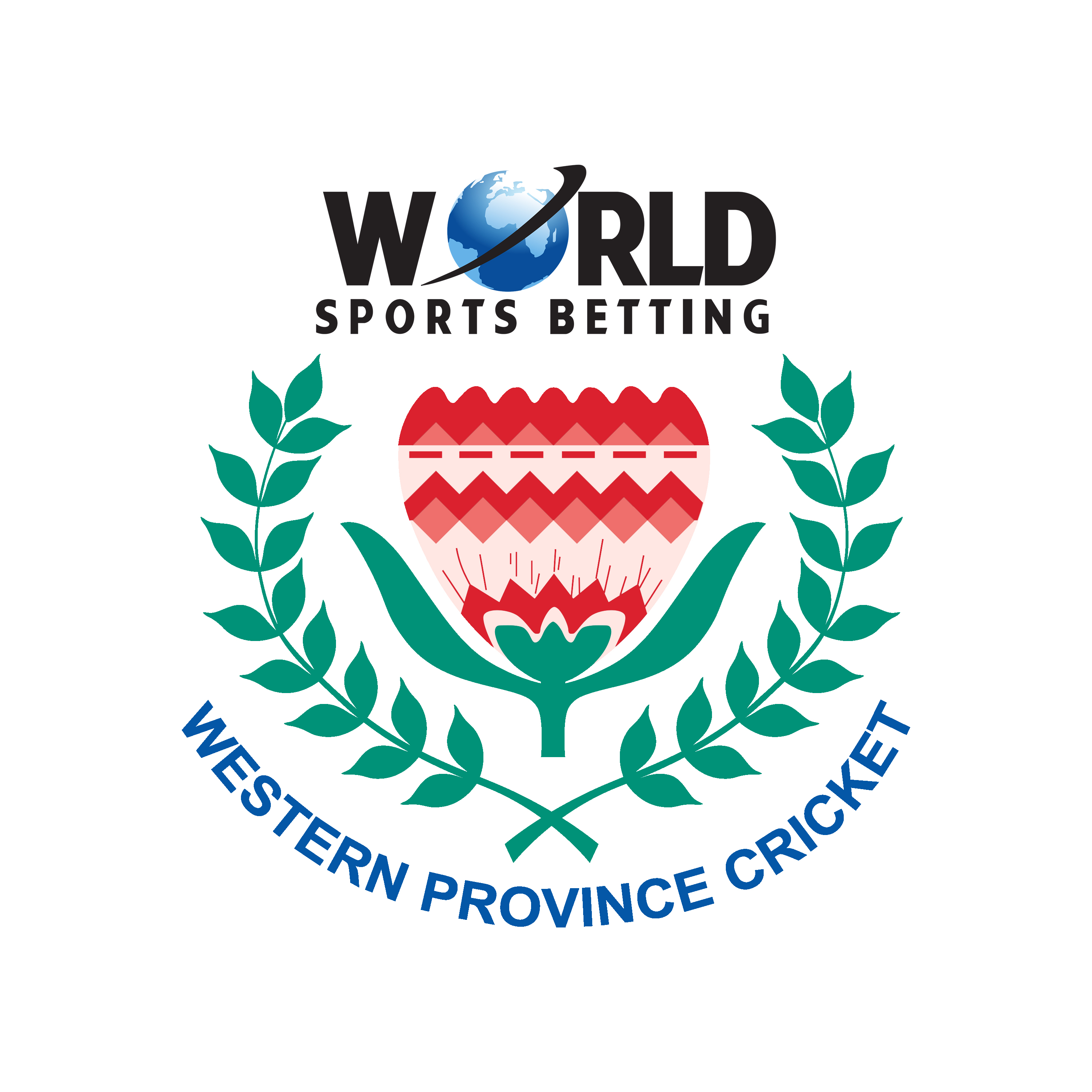
- Sport: Cricket
- Jurisdiction: Cape Town, South Africa
- Abbreviation: WPCA
- Founded: 1864
- Affiliation: Cricket South Africa
- Headquarters: Cape Town
- Location: Western Cape, South Africa

Official website
- newlandscricket.com
- (South Africa)

The Western Province Cricket Association is the governing body for cricket in the Cape Town region. Its representative team, Western Province, competes in South Africa's domestic competition the Supersport Series, formerly known as the Castle Cup or the Currie Cup.
