= Newlands Cricket Ground =

Cricket ground

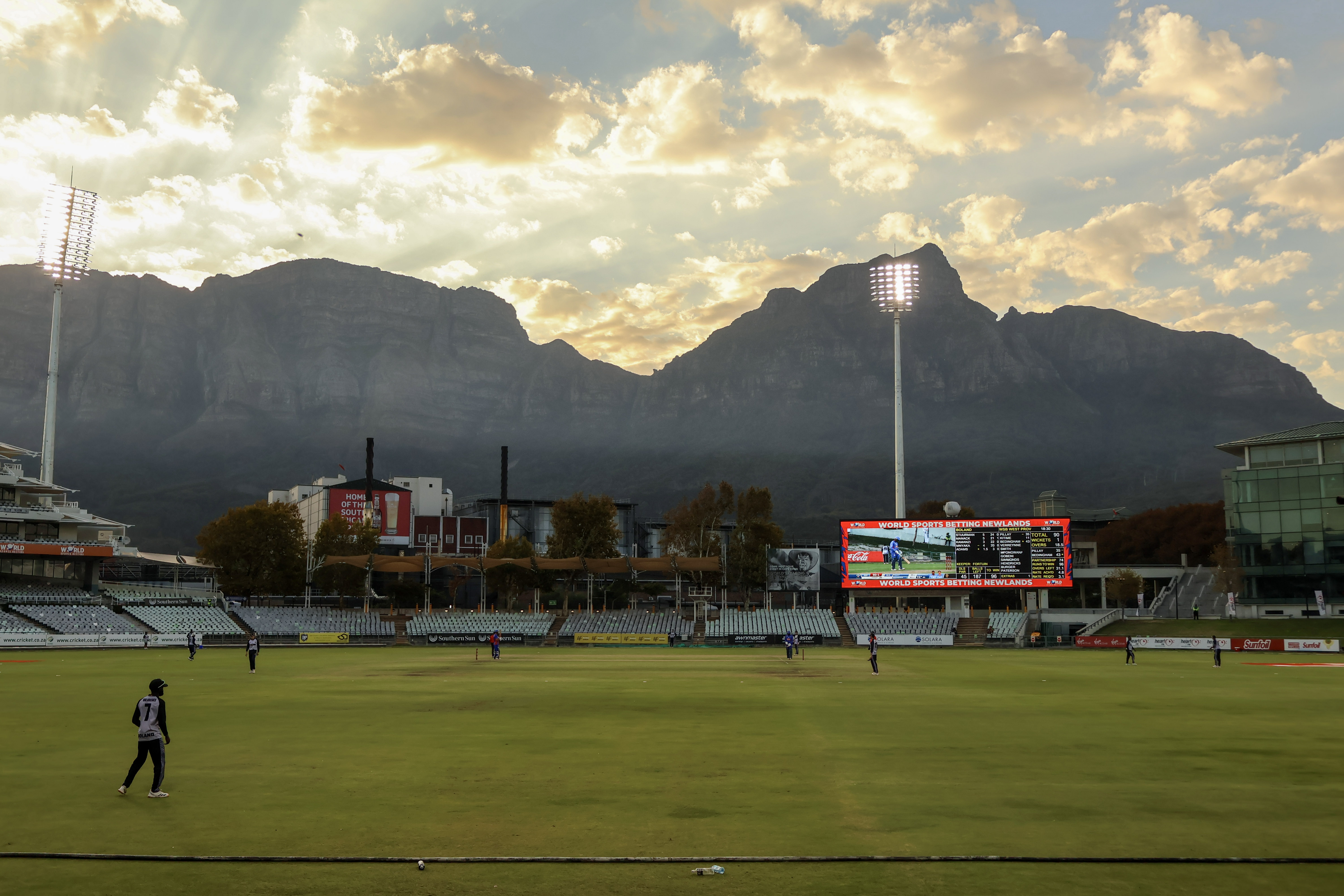
- Newlands Cricket Ground in 2026
- Interactive map of Newlands Cricket Ground

Ground information
- Location: Cape Town, South Africa
- Country: South Africa
- Coordinates: 33°58′25″S 18°28′8″E
- Establishment: 1888
- Capacity: 25,000
- Tenants: Western Province Cricket Association and Western Province Cricket Club
- End names
- Wynberg End; Kelvin Grove End

International information
- First men's Test: 25–26 March 1889: South Africa v England
- Last men's Test: 27–31 October 2026: South Africa v Australia
- First men's ODI: 7 December 1992: South Africa v India
- Last men's ODI: 19 December 2024: South Africa v Pakistan
- First men's T20I: 12 September 2007: Australia v Zimbabwe
- Last men's T20I: 1 December 2020: South Africa v England
- First women's Test: 13–16 January 1961: South Africa v England
- Last women's Test: 25–28 February 1972: South Africa v New Zealand
- First women's ODI: 18 October 2009: South Africa v West Indies
- Last women's ODI: 23 October 2009: South Africa v West Indies
- First women's T20I: 26 October 2009: South Africa v West Indies
- Last women's T20I: 5 December 2025: South Africa v Ireland

Team information
| South Africa | (1889-present) |
| Western Province | (1890-present) |
| Cape Cobras | (2005 – 2021) |
| Cape Town Blitz | (2018-2019) |
| MI Cape Town | (2023-present) |
- As of 28 October 2026; Source: Cricinfo

Newlands Cricket Ground is a cricket venue in Newlands, Cape Town. One of the oldest sporting stadiums in South Africa, the ground is owned by the Western Province Cricket Association (WPCA) and is the home of Western Province and MI Cape Town.

Regarded as one of the most iconic and beautiful international cricket grounds in the world, Newlands is overlooked by both Table Mountain and Devil’s Peak, a view which has become celebrated for a visually stunning backdrop during play.

Established in 1888, Newlands has undergone significant redevelopment in recent years with capacity having been increased to 25,000, largely due to portions of the grass embankments being replaced by modern pavilions. In 2019 WPCA announced a joint venture with Sanlam Properties to further upgrade and redevelop the ground, transforming it into a sustainable mixed-use sport, commercial, education and leisure-oriented area, but where cricket continues to enjoy preference.

== History ==
=== Background ===
In 1887, acting on behalf of the Western Province Cricket Club (WPCC), a sub-committee inquired into the possibility that part of Mariendal Farm, situated near Newlands village, might be made available via renting or purchase for use of a cricket ground. On inspection, the sub-committee agreed that Lot 27, although partly wetland and heavily wooded, was potentially an ideal cricket site. By coincidence, the Western Province Rugby Union (WPRU) also found Mariendal Farm to be the preferred site for their own ground, leasing a 150-yard by 150-yard plot and later becoming the Newlands Stadium.

The title deeds for the land had originally been acquired in 1845 by Jacob Letterstedt, a local brewer, with Newlands becoming closely associated with numerous commercial brewing companies. Original Mariendal Brewery buildings still stand today, located just behind the stadium as part of Newlands Brewery.

After the death of Jacob Letterstedt, his daughter Lydia (Vicomtesse de Montmort) continued to manage the business and in 1887 agreed a £50 rent with WPCC for use of the land. The following year, in 1888, a long-term lease agreement of 25 years was signed, with the rent increasing to £100 (£10,700 in 2023). Each of the Club's life members contributed £25 towards costs, with further donations of £350 being allocated for the construction of a pavilion.

=== Early history ===
On 2 January 1888, Newlands was officially 'opened' with a Mother Country v Colonial Born two-day match - an event which had become a regular fixture since 1862.

Before the arrival of the Australians in 1902, which included Victor Trumper, the pine trees, which extended from the "B" field along Camp Ground Road and around the pavilion, were replaced by oak trees. This is the site of the current Oaks Enclosure, one of the most popular vantage points. A then-record crowd of 10 000 arrived to see the Test.

== Test cricket ==
The ground hosted its first Test match on 24 March 1889 when England defeated South Africa by an innings and 202 runs. There have been 56 Test matches played at the ground of which South Africa has won 23, their opponents 22 and 11 which ended in a draw. The last team to beat South Africa in the stadium was India in January 2024.

== Limited over cricket ==
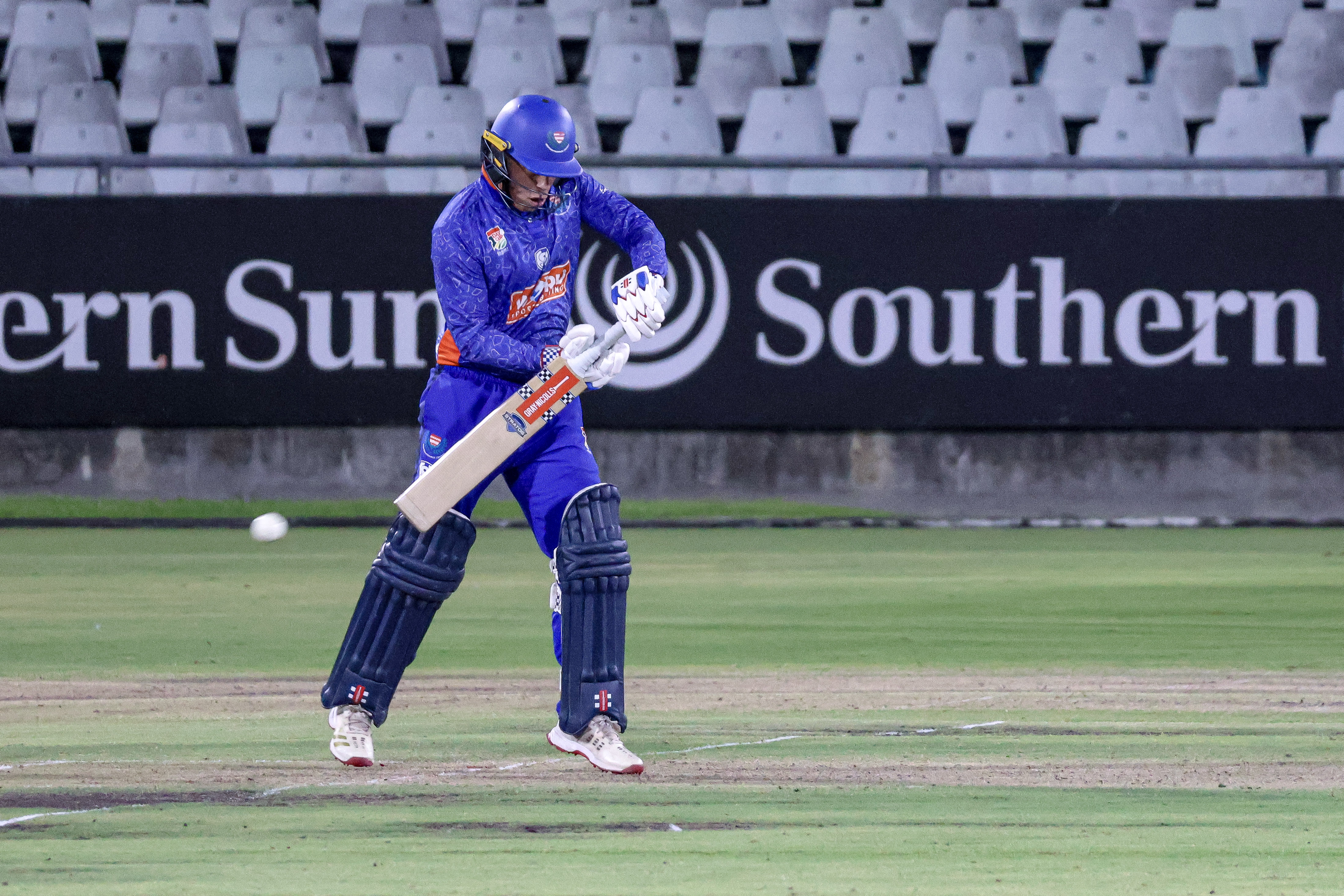
Kyle Verreynne batting for Western Province in 2026 at Newlands Cricket Ground

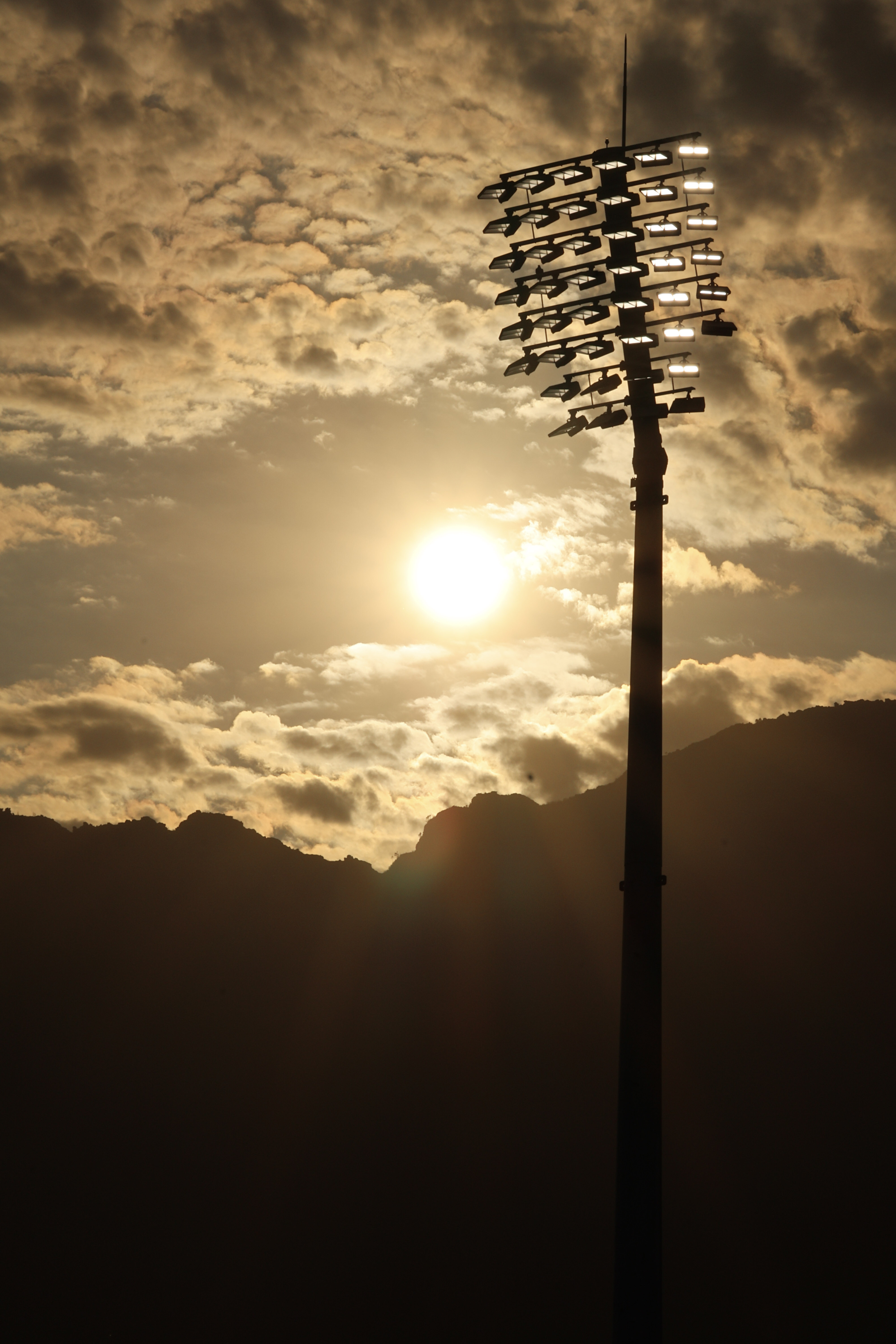
New floodlights in 2026

The first One Day International played at the ground was on 7 December 1992 when South Africa beat India by 6 wickets. As of June 2019, there have been 41 One Day Internationals played at the ground including five in the 2003 Cricket World Cup. South Africa has won 30 of its ODI games here and lost 6 (India being the most recent opposition victor in February 2018).

Newlands is one of the few cricket grounds in South Africa that tends to favour spinners. Most grounds tend to favour pacemen or batsmen, but the Western Cape has had a history of having very good spinners, a recent example being Paul Adams.

== Office block development ==
In July 2016, the City of Cape Town approved the rezoning application to transform the Newlands Cricket Ground into a sustainable mixed-use sport, commercial, education and leisure-oriented precinct. The cricket field and surrounding seating were specifically excluded from any form of development.

In March 2019, it was announced that an office block development would be added to the historic cricket ground, as an addition to the existing stadium, making Newlands Cricket Ground a mixed-use precinct. The mixed-use precinct is owned by South African investment company, Sanlam (51%) and the Western Province Cricket Association (49%).

The first phase of the development is expected to be completed in December 2020, whilst the long-term plan for the Newlands Cricket Ground development will see further upgrades to the historic cricket ground that will take the project into 2024.

According to the official website for the commercial development, JSE-listed AdvTech is the anchor tenant for the redevelopment.

== Upgrades for 2027 Cricket World Cup ==
In perparation for the 2027 ICC Cricket World Cup, which is scheduled to be hosted by South Africa, Zimbabwe and Namibia, the ground's were upgraded from halogen to LED floodlights. The five pylons were replaced, along with a brand new smaller six pylon being added.

== Other sports ==
The ground has also hosted exhibition matches in Australian rules football. In 1998, a crowd of 10,123 saw the Brisbane Lions play Fremantle.

== Gallery ==
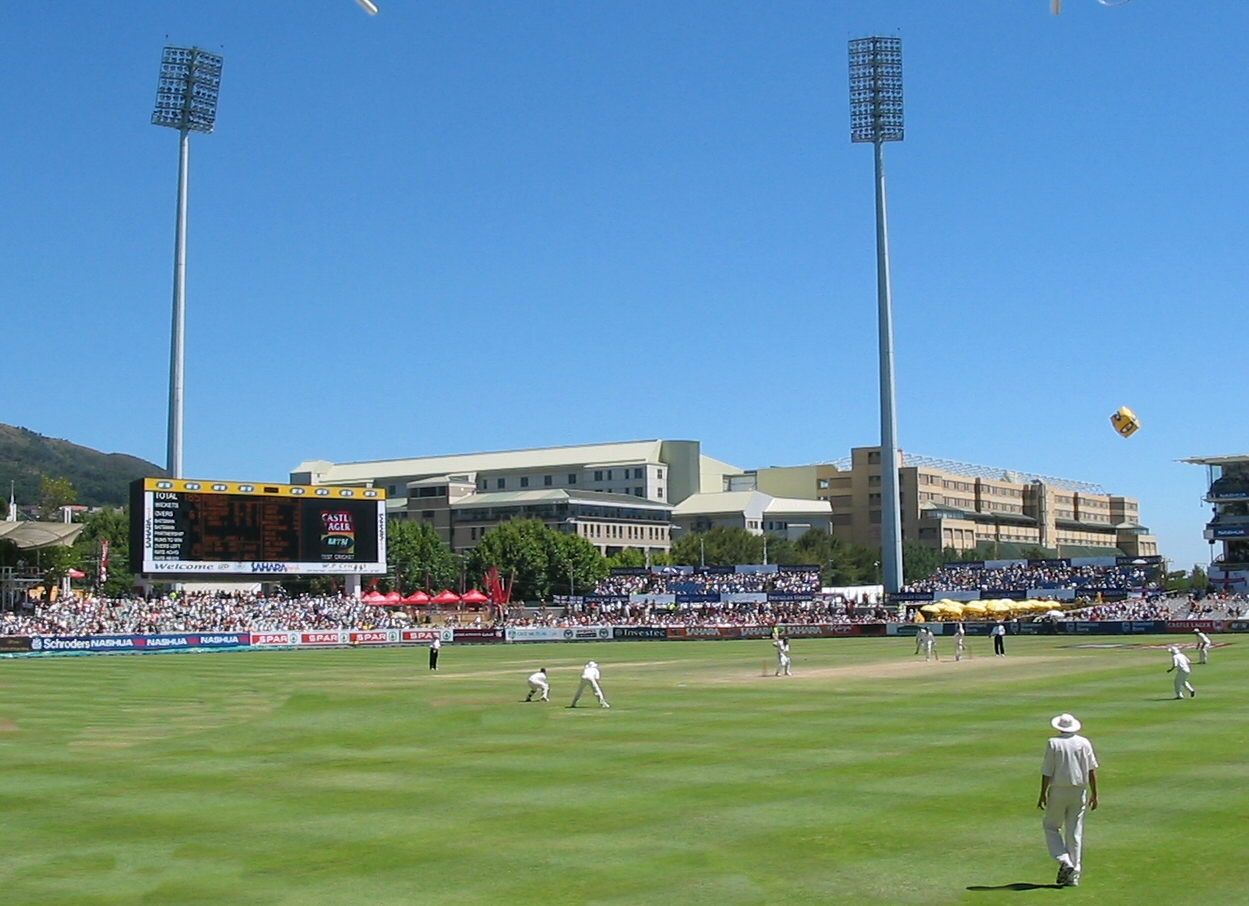
Newlands Ground in 2005

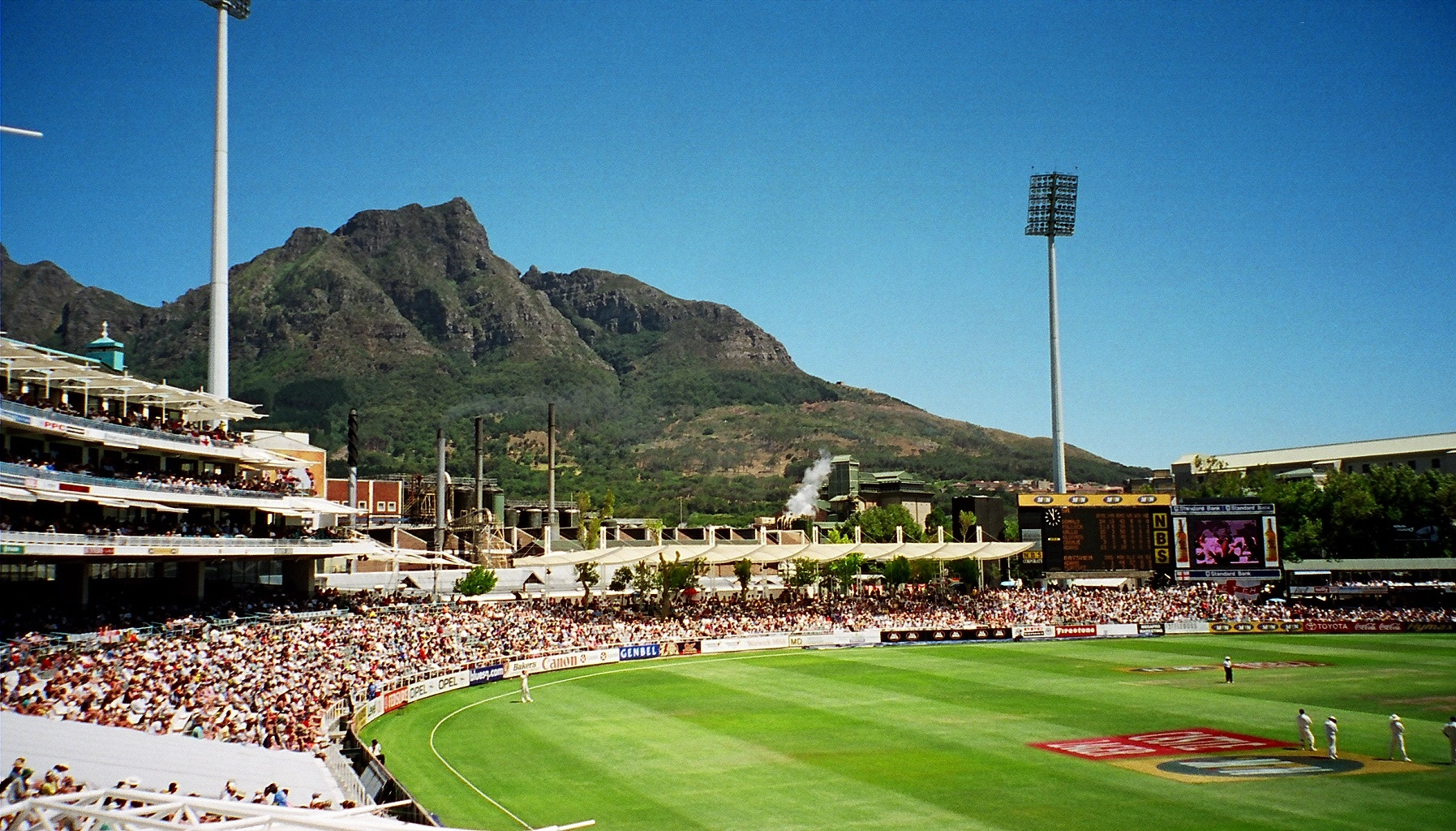
Newlands in 2005

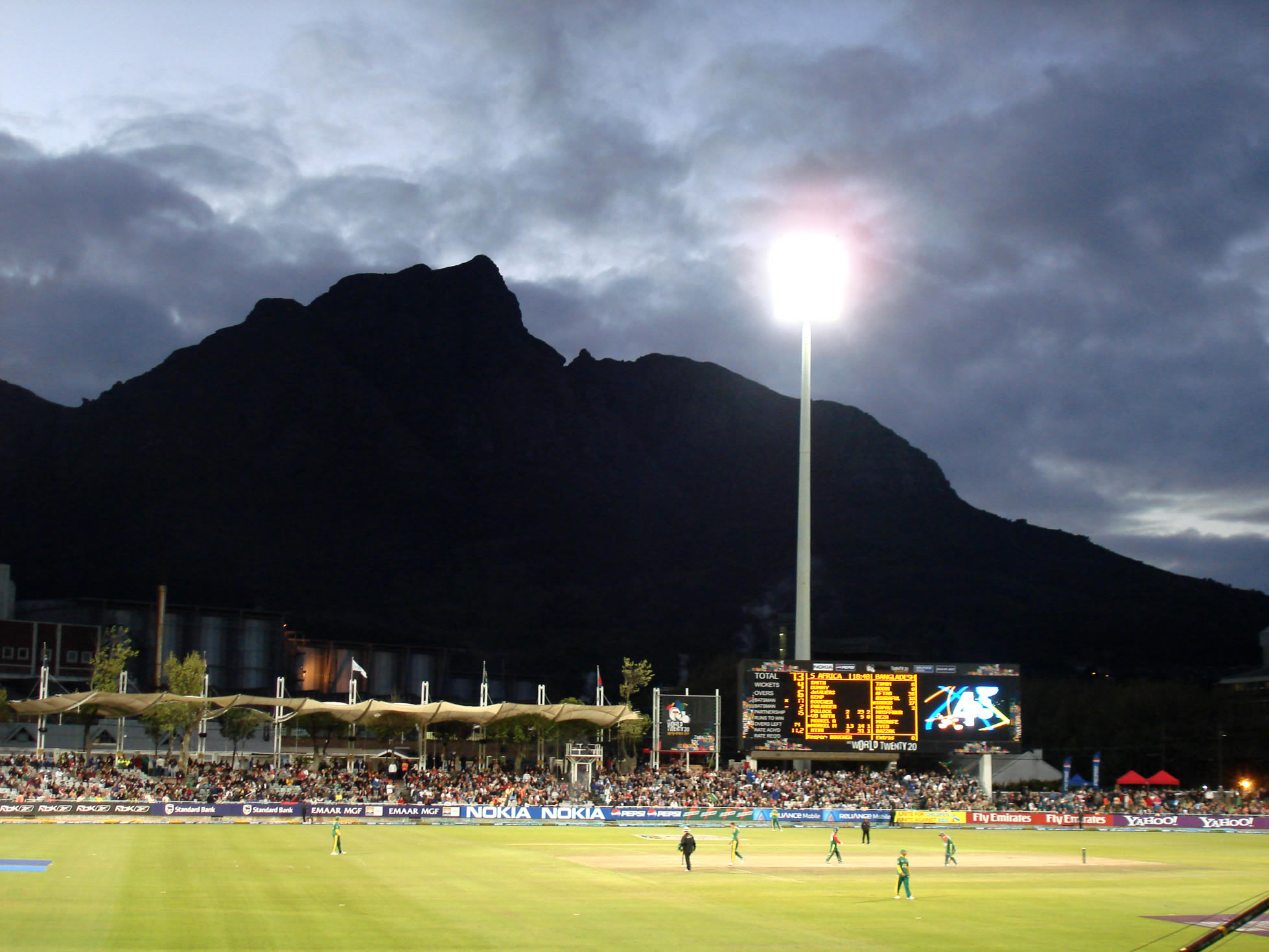
Evening match in 2007

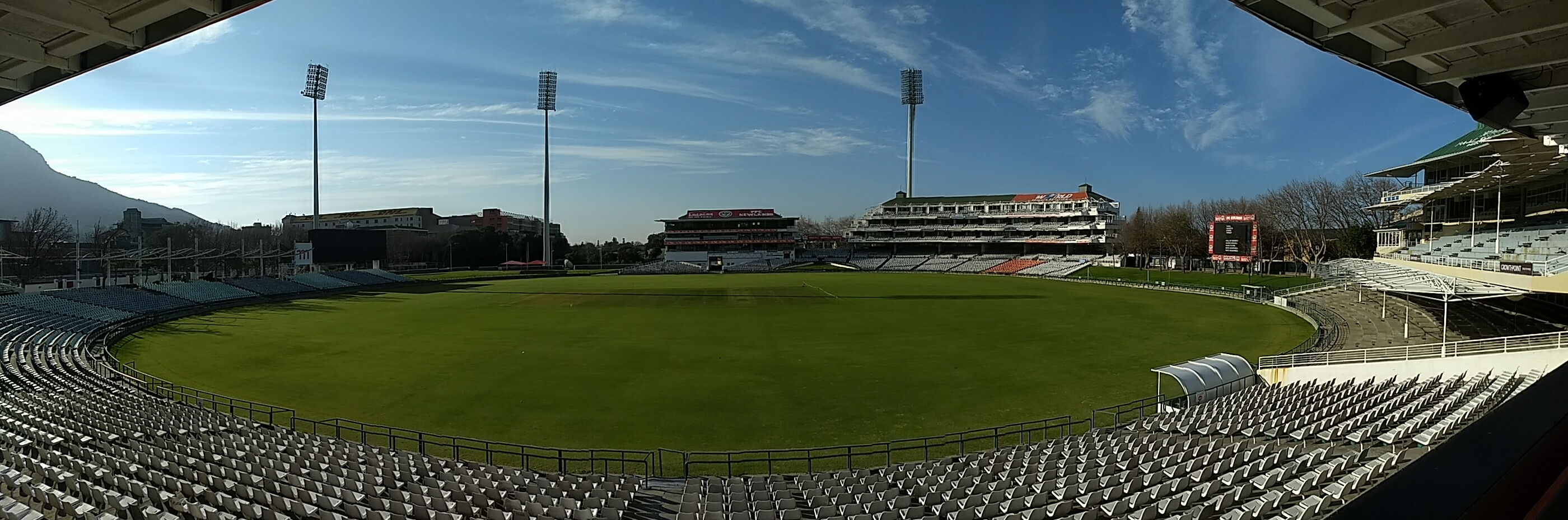
Panoramic view of the Ground, 2018

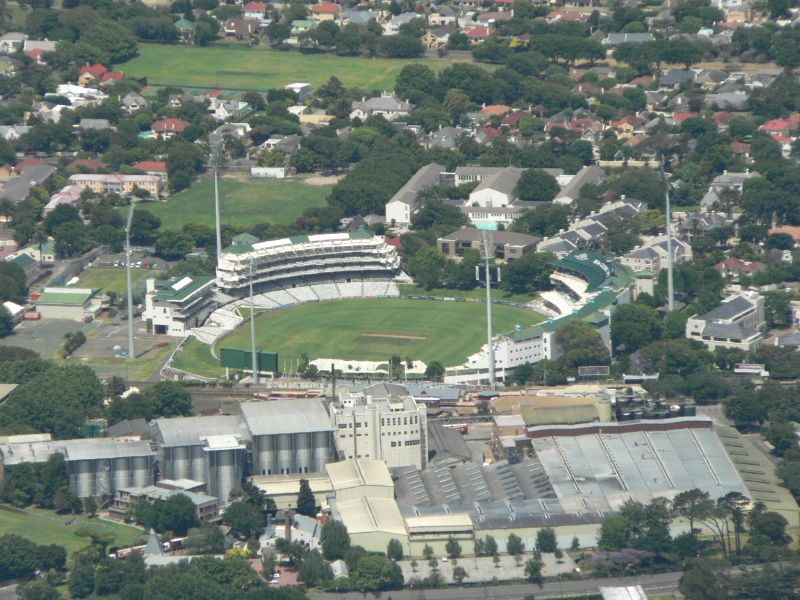
Aerial view, with Newlands Brewery in foreground

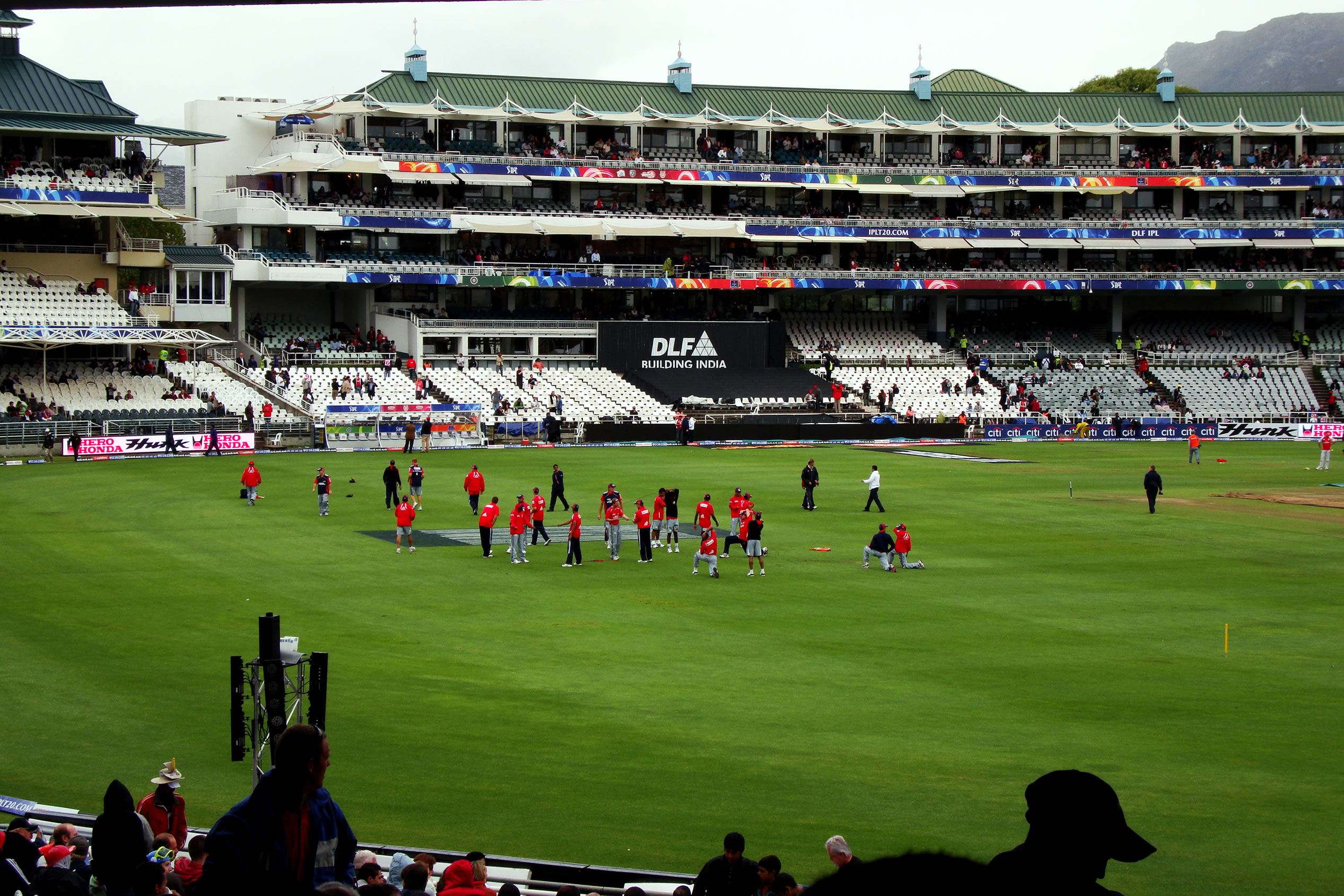
Newlands Ground in 2008

== See also ==
- List of Test cricket grounds
