= Private Banks Sports Ground =

Cricket ground in Lewisham, England

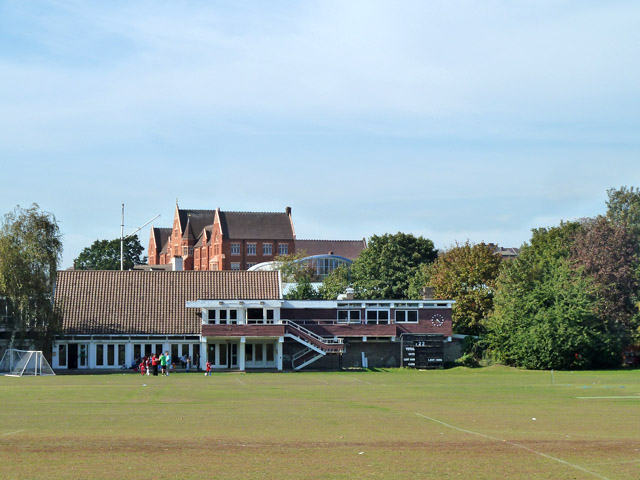
- The former Private Banks Sports Ground
- Interactive map of Private Banks Sports Ground

Ground information
- Location: Catford Bridge, London Borough of Lewisham
- Country: England
- Coordinates: 51.443°N 0.024°W
- Establishment: 1872
- Owner: St Dunstan's College

Team information
Kent County Cricket Club	(1875–1921)
- As of 10 August 2016; Source: CricketArchive

Private Banks Sports Ground is a 20 acres (8.1 ha) cricket and multi-use sports ground in Catford Bridge in the London Borough of Lewisham. The ground, which was in the historic county of Kent until 1889, was used as a first-class cricket venue by Kent County Cricket Club between 1875 and 1921. In 2012, the ground was sold to the Educational Foundation of nearby independent school St Dunstan's College and renamed the Jubilee Ground.

The ground is 250 metres (0.16 mi) southwest of Catford town centre. The A205 South Circular road runs along the northern edge of the ground. Catford Bridge railway station is adjacent to the ground and Catford railway station is close by. The Mid-Kent railway line runs down the western team of the ground, with the Catford Loop Line along the southwestern edge.

== Cricketing history ==
The ground was established in 1872 and the first recorded match on the ground was in 1874 between Private Banks Cricket Club and MCC. The ground's first first-class cricket match followed in 1875 when Kent County Cricket Club played Sussex in a county match. The county played a further three matches on the ground in 1875, their only home county matches of the season, and the possibility of making the ground the headquarters for the county was discussed, the St Lawrence Ground in Canterbury not being established in this role at this point. When the ground was established former Middlesex cricketer George Hearne was appointed as groundsman. Three of his sons went on to play for Kent and England, with one, George Gibbons Hearne, making his home debut for the county during the 1875 season at the ground.

Kent next used the ground for first-class cricket in 1892 when they played Somerset in the County Championship. The county used the ground during most years in the period up until the First World War, including for matches against the touring West Indians in 1906, South Africans in 1907 and Indians in 1911. Following the war, Kent returned to the ground in 1920 and 1921, with the final first-class match on the ground being against Nottinghamshire in June 1921.

The ground held a single Second XI Championship match for the Kent Second XI in 1959, when they played the Worcestershire Second XI.

== Modern use ==
The Jubilee Ground is designated as Metropolitan Open Land and forms an important open space within Catford. Cricket is still played on the ground which has been developed into a multi-use sports ground. It is a venue for local five-a-side football and rugby. In 2012 the ground was sold to St Dunstan's College through its Educational Foundation. The site is used by the school and has both sports facilities and meeting rooms which can be hired.

== Records on the ground ==
A total of 38 first-class cricket matches were played on the ground, all of which featured Kent as the home team.

- Highest total: 593 by Kent against Gloucestershire, 1909
- Lowest total: 35 by Kent against Sussex, 1894
- Highest partnership: 224, 2nd wicket by E Humphreys and J Seymour, for Kent against Gloucestershire, 1909
- Highest individual score: 208, E Humphreys against Gloucestershire, 1909
- Best bowling in an innings: 8/26, W Rhodes for Yorkshire, 1902
- Best bowling in a match: 13/83, WH Lockwood for Surrey, 1894

== See also ==
- List of Kent County Cricket Club grounds
