= George Francis Hearne =

English cricketer

George Francis Hearne (1851–1931) was an English first-class cricketer.

He was the son of Tom Hearne and played once for Marylebone Cricket Club (MCC) in 1882. He became the long-serving MCC pavilion clerk at Lord's.

== See also ==
- The Hearne family
