= South Carolina Court of Appeals =

Appellate court in South Carolina, US

- Established: 1 September 1983
- Jurisdiction: South Carolina
- Location: Columbia
- Motto: Ius suum cuique
- Composition method: Election by the General Assembly
- Authorised by: S.C. Const. art. V, § 7
- Appeals to: Supreme Court of South Carolina
- Judge term length: Six years, staggered
- Number of positions: 9
- Website: Court of Appeals

Chief Judge
- Currently: H. Bruce Williams
- Since: February 2022

The South Carolina Court of Appeals is the intermediate-level appellate court for the state of South Carolina.

== Jurisdiction ==
The Court of Appeals hears most appeals from the Circuit Courts and Family Courts of South Carolina that do not fall within the seven classes of cases over which the South Carolina Supreme Court exercises exclusive jurisdiction. Those seven classes are cases involving

1. the death penalty
2. public utility rates
3. significant constitutional issues
4. public bond issues
5. election laws
6. an order limiting the investigation by a state grand jury
7. an order issued by a family court relating to an abortion by a minor

== History ==
=== Pre-Civil War ===
The modern incarnation of the court began operations in 1983, but had historical antecedents dating back to colonial times. In 1721, the General Court of the colonial government was given appellate jurisdiction over civil case decisions from the lower courts of the colony, but there were no separate appellate courts. The original South Carolina Constitution of 1790 made provisions for trial court judges to meet at the end of a term to decide on such matters as motions for new trials and other related matters. This practice was formalized by statute in 1799, when the South Carolina General Assembly created an appellate body of state circuit judges known as the "Constitutional Court", and provided for the writ of error to be used.

The General Assembly created a Court of Equity in 1808, but this also proved to be unsatisfactory to the administration of justice, primarily because in many cases, the trial judge also sat on the appellate body. The General Assembly responded by creating the first Court of Appeals in 1824, which consisted of three judges and had appellate jurisdiction in cases of law and equity. The Court was not an intermediate appellate body as the modern Court is, but a court of last resort that functioned similarly to the Constitutional Court.

Unfortunately, this Court of Appeals would become a casualty of the Nullification Crisis. The pro-nullification General Assembly, in its zeal to nullify the Tariff of 1828 and support of state supremacy, passed legislation mandating that officers in the State Militia recite a "test oath" swearing allegiance to South Carolina rather than the federal government. One state militia officer, M'Cready, refused to recite the oath, and was thus denied his commission. M'Cready petitioned the state trial court for a writ of mandamus compelling the commander to grant him his commission. After the trial court denied his petition, M'Cready sought appellate review before the Court of Appeals. The case of M'Cready v. Hunt came before the Court of Appeals in 1834, and the Court reversed the lower court's opinion by a vote of 2 to 1, declaring the oath unconstitutional.

The General Assembly was outraged by the Court of Appeals' decision in M'Cready v. Hunt, and responded by abolishing the Court in the 1835 Legislative session. The Court was replaced the following year, when the General Assembly passed an act providing for separate Courts of Appeals for cases in law and equity. The Act also provided that all the law judges and equity judges would sit en banc as a Court of Errors to hear appeals of constitutional questions, when the court was divided, or when any two judges certified the case. These new Courts of Appeals suffered the same defects that the previous appellate bodies did: in both law and equity cases, the appellant was disadvantaged by the fact that the trial judge also sat on the appellate body.

The Court of Appeals was reestablished in 1859, again with three judges (this time, one chief judge and two associate judges). The procedure was a bit more complex this time around: the Court of Appeals could issue final judgments in both law and equity, but in cases where a constitutional question or conflict of laws issue was presented, the judges of the courts of law and equity would convene along with the Court of Appeals in a Court of Errors. The Court of Errors' decisions were final and unappealable.

After the defeat of the Confederacy in the American Civil War, South Carolina called a new Constitutional Convention. The South Carolina Constitution of 1868 provided for Supreme Court, circuit courts, "and such inferior courts as the Legislature should provide", but did not create any intermediate appellate courts.

=== Modern times ===
The Court of Appeals was revived by the General Assembly in 1979, to relieve the growing backlog of appellate cases in the state's judicial system. The Court was to consist of a Chief Judge and four associate judges, and have appellate jurisdiction over only criminal and family court cases. This new Court was intended to begin operations in 1980, but this was delayed by a number of constitutional disputes which forced the General Assembly to rewrite the act authorizing the Court, and delaying its opening until 1983. One dispute concerned the court's membership; the state supreme court objected when the judges of the new court were going to include then-sitting legislators. On May 19, 1983, the South Carolina Senate approved legislation which would create an interim appellate court starting in September 1983 and lasting for two years; the public would then have a chance to vote on a constitutional amendment to create a permanent intermediate court in 1984. By the time the new court was created, it took approximately three and a half years for an appeal from a trial court to be heard by the state's supreme court. Finally, in November 1984, voters approved a constitutional amendment making the South Carolina Court of Appeals a constitutional court. This voter referendum was ratified by the General Assembly on January 17, 1985.

At first, the new court functioned only to divert certain cases from the Supreme Court, but in 1992, procedures were changed so that the Court of Appeals became an intermediate court of review, and appeals to the Supreme Court were mostly discretionary. In 1992, Judge Sanders resigned from the court, following the acceptance of an offer to serve as the President of the College of Charleston. The Chief Judge seat remained vacant until 1993, when Judge William T. Howell was elected.

== Judges ==
As of February 5, 2025 the judges of the court are:

Name	Start	Law School
Bruce Williams, Chief Judge	May 25, 2004 (Note: Elected as Chief Judge on February 2, 2022 by the state legislature.)	South Carolina
Paula Thomas	February 7, 2007	South Carolina
Aphrodite Konduros	February 6, 2008	South Carolina
John Geathers	May 21, 2008	South Carolina
Stephanie McDonald	May 28, 2014	South Carolina
Blake Hewitt	February 2019	South Carolina
Jerry Vinson	February 3, 2021	South Carolina
Matthew Turner	April 17, 2024	South Carolina
Kristi Curtis	February 5, 2025	South Carolina
