= Tom Hearne =

English cricketer (1826–1900)

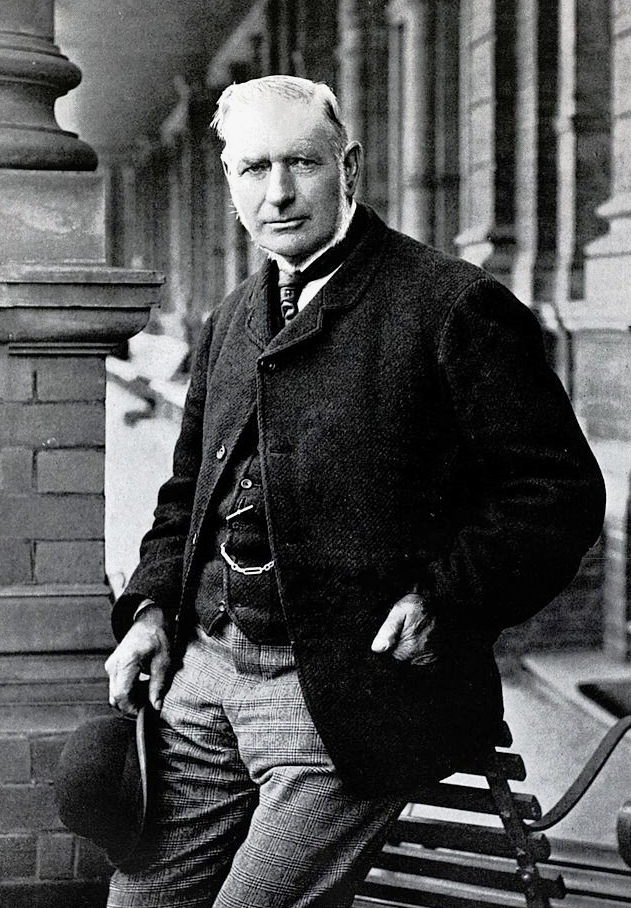
- Tom Hearne, c.1895

Personal information
- Full name: Thomas Hearne
- Born: 4 September 1826; Chalfont St Peter, Buckinghamshire
- Died: 13 May 1900 (aged 73); Ealing, Middlesex
- Batting: Right-handed
- Bowling: Right arm medium (roundarm)
- Role: All-rounder

Domestic team information
- Years: Team
- 1857–1876: Marylebone Cricket Club (MCC)
- 1858–1864: United England Eleven (UEE)
- 1859–1863: Middlesex XI
- 1860–1872: England XI
- 1860–1872: South
- 1863–1869: Players
- 1864–1875: Middlesex CCC
- 1872: United South of England Eleven (USEE)

Career statistics
Competition	First-class
Matches	173
Runs scored	5,048
Batting average	18.55
100s/50s	4/21
Top score	146
Balls bowled	11,948
Wickets	292
Bowling average	14.10
5 wickets in innings	16
10 wickets in match	2
Best bowling	6/12
Catches/stumpings	116/7
- Source: CricketArchive, 2 November 2022

Thomas Hearne (4 September 1826 – 13 May 1900) was an English professional cricketer who played for Middlesex county teams, including the new county club, from 1859 to 1875. He was employed by Marylebone Cricket Club on their ground staff at Lord's and he played in many matches for the club's teams from 1857 to 1876. Hearne travelled to Australia in 1861–62 as a member of the first English team to tour the country. He was born in Chalfont St Peter, Buckinghamshire, and died in Ealing, Middlesex. His brother was George Hearne Sr and they began a cricketing dynasty, thirteen family members becoming first-class players.

Hearne was an all-rounder who played in 173 top-class matches. (Note: Hearne's career straddled the 1864 threshold between pre- and unofficial first-class cricket. Eleven-a-side matches played 1864–1894 which involved certain approved teams, including those Hearne played for, may be considered first-class in accordance with the ACS' "First-class Matches Guide". Roy Webber, Wisden Cricketers' Almanack and the Playfair Cricket Annual all recognise 1864 as the startpoint for their first-class cricket records and for first-class matches played by the county clubs which were active at that time. Pre-1864 matches which are included in the ACS' "Important Match Guide" may generally be regarded as top-class or, at least, historically significant.) As a right-handed batsman, he scored 5,048 career runs at an average of 18.55 runs per completed innings with a highest score of 146 as one of four centuries. He was a right arm medium pace using the roundarm style and took 292 wickets with a best return of 6/12. He took five wickets in an innings sixteen times and ten wickets in a match twice. His best match return was 12/76. Highly rated as a fielder who was good enough to play as an occasional wicket-keeper, he held 116 career catches and completed seven stumpings.

== Career ==
Tom Hearne was born on 4 September 1826 at Chalfont St Peter, Buckinghamshire. He was a right-handed batsman and a right arm medium pace using the roundarm style. He was also an occasional wicket-keeper.

Hearne is not recorded as a cricketer until 1857 when he was nearly 31 years old. In an 1889 pen picture written for Cricket: A Weekly Record of the Game, his friend Bob Thoms says Hearne played in local Buckinghamshire cricket from the age of sixteen and that there was "hardly a (venue) in the home counties on which he had not performed". Eventually, Hearne's prowess as a player was recognised by John Walker of the Southgate Cricket Club and that led to him playing for Middlesex and being engaged on the ground staff at Lord's.

Hearne played for Marylebone Cricket Club (MCC) teams from 1857 to 1876, but he is best known as a player for Middlesex, first playing for the county in 1859. He was invited to join the new Middlesex County Cricket Club when it was founded at the end of 1863 and made his debut for them in the 1864 season.

Hearne was a member of the England team led by H. H. Stephenson that toured Australia in 1861–62, the first to do so. The team travelled on the SS Great Britain.

Hearne and his brother George began a cricketing dynasty – thirteen family members became first-class players.

Hearne made four centuries in his career with a highest score of 146. His best bowling figures were 6/12 (innings) and 12/76 (match). He died in Ealing, Middlesex, on 13 May 1900.

== Sources ==
- ACS (1981). A Guide to Important Cricket Matches Played in the British Isles 1709–1863. Nottingham: ACS.
- Webber, Roy (1951). The Playfair Book of Cricket Records. London: Playfair Books. ASIN B0000CHVVU.
