= J. T. Hearne =

English cricketer

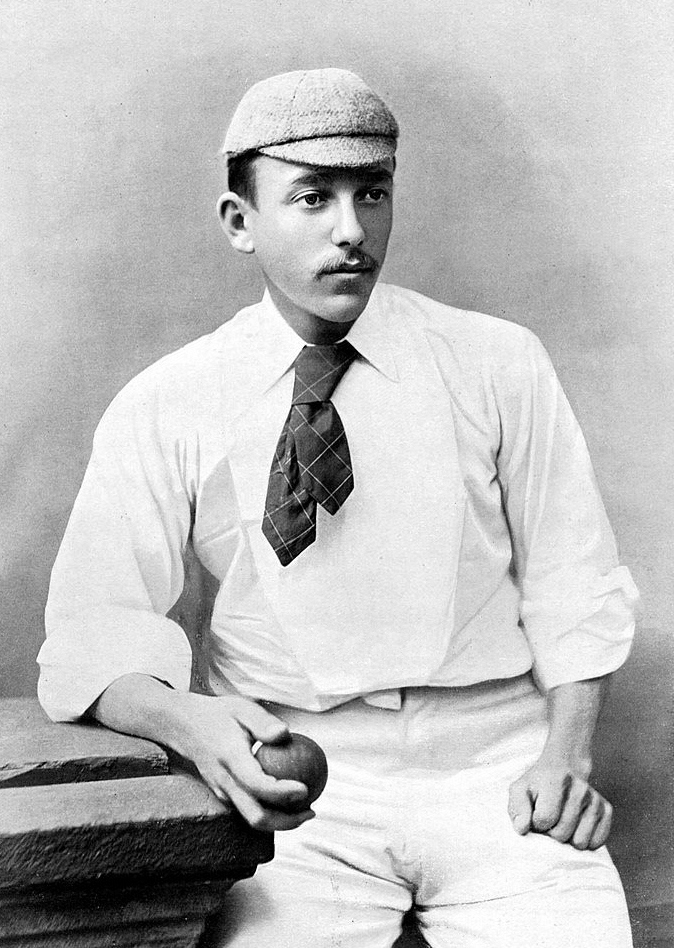

Personal information
- Full name: John Thomas Hearne
- Born: 3 May 1867; Chalfont St Giles, Buckinghamshire
- Died: 17 April 1944 (aged 76); Chalfont St Giles, Buckinghamshire
- Nickname: Old Jack
- Batting: Right-handed
- Bowling: Right arm medium
- Relatives: Herbert Hearne (brother); Walter Hearne (brother); Other family

International information
- National side: England
- Test debut (cap 78): 19 March 1892 v South Africa
- Last Test: 19 July 1899 v Australia

Domestic team information
- Years: Team
- 1888–1923: Middlesex

Career statistics
Competition	Test	First-class
Matches	12	639
Runs scored	126	7,205
Batting average	9.00	11.98
100s/50s	0/0	0/8
Top score	40	71
Balls bowled	2,976	144,470
Wickets	49	3,061
Bowling average	22.08	17.75
5 wickets in innings	4	255
10 wickets in match	1	66
Best bowling	6/41	9/32
Catches/stumpings	4/–	425/–
- Source: CricInfo, 10 July 2013

John Thomas Hearne (3 May 1867 – 17 April 1944) (known as Jack Hearne, J. T. Hearne or Old Jack Hearne to avoid confusion with J. W. Hearne to whom he was distantly related) was a Middlesex and England medium-fast bowler. His aggregate of 3061 first-class wickets is the greatest for any bowler of medium pace or above, and his 257 wickets in 1896 is the tenth highest total on record. In 1891, 1896, 1898, 1904 and 1910 Hearne headed the first-class bowling averages.

In his heyday, he was able to gain vigorous off-break from even the most docile wickets. Hearne was also able to vary his pace and bowl a fast ball that swerved at a time when the skill was not well known. He had a long run for the time and a classic, full-on, high action that gave him higher bounce on hard, very fast wickets than most bowlers of the 1890s. His ability to thrive on hard work was seen in the dry summer of 1896 when he bowled over 10,000 balls – a feat performed previously only by Alfred Shaw, whilst in 1898 Hearne bowled over 9000 balls in a wetter summer.

He was a dependable field near the wicket at a time when catching was the most vital part of fielding, and could occasionally prove a useful batsman in a crisis.

== Early life ==
Born in Chalfont St Giles, Buckinghamshire, Jack Hearne first played for Middlesex in 1888 against the Australians. He was not qualified until 1890, and when he played his first County Championship match, Hearne did not know he was playing until the last minute. Yet, he took six for 62, though his performances for the rest of the year were only moderate given the primitiveness of pitches at the time – something that was changing at a rate unprecedented in cricket history during Hearne's prime. In 1891, however, Hearne advanced in a remarkable way, taking 118 wickets in county cricket for only 10.33 runs apiece. This included two amazing bowling feats – 9 for 32 versus Nottinghamshire at Nottingham and 8 for 22 against Lancashire at Lord's. So much of a sensation did Hearne cause that year that Wisden named him as a Cricketer of the Year for 1892 and he toured South Africa with a party led by W.W. Read to play in his first Test. He made a surprising 40, but had almost no bowling to do.

== Cricketing career ==
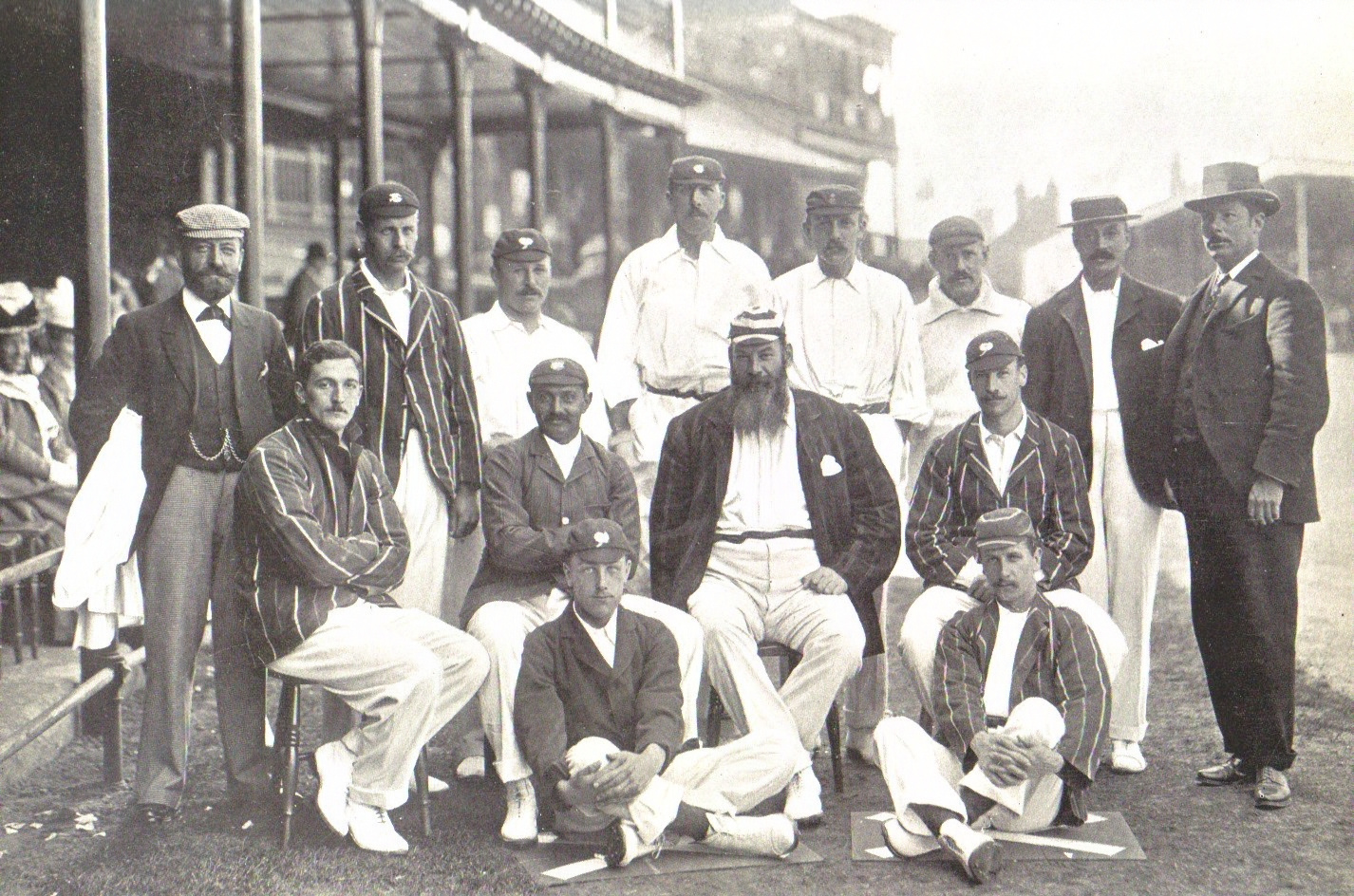
England team v. Australia, Trent Bridge 1899. Back row: Dick Barlow (umpire), Tom Hayward, George Hirst, Billy Gunn, J T Hearne (12th man), Bill Storer (wkt kpr), Bill Brockwell, V A Titchmarsh (umpire). Middle row: C B Fry, K S Ranjitsinhji, W G Grace (captain), Stanley Jackson. Front row: Wilfred Rhodes, Johnny Tyldesley.

From 1892, Hearne was the stock bowler not only for Middlesex, but also for the Marylebone Cricket Club (MCC), which at the time played against the counties Middlesex did not arrange County Championship fixtures with. In 1893, Hearne surpassed his previous form by taking over 200 wickets in a dry summer and his persistence and skill on hard pitches (notably in the two games with Nottinghamshire) was wonderful. In 1894, a very wet summer, Hearne just failed to reach 200, yet his omission from the 1894/1895 tour of Australia remains puzzling given his persistence and pace from the ground might have been well-suited to the hard pitches then evolving in Australia.

In 1895, Hearne had a temporary setback, taking only 133 wickets and at times appearing stale. However, despite the driest summer he had yet played through, 1896 proved to be Hearne's great year: his 257 wickets included an amazing haul of 56 for just over 13 each against the Australians: a feat bettered only by Jim Laker in 1956 under more helpful weather conditions. Though a few very badly broken wickets at Lord's in a very dry May helped him, his work on the hard and true pitches earned respect, even fear, from most batsmen, and when the weather finally broke up in August, he took 10 for 60 on a difficult Oval wicket to ensure England the Ashes. Earlier in the year he had taken all nine wickets that fell for MCC against the Australians (George Giffen was absent). In 1897, though his feats were less staggering than the previous year because the wickets at Lord's in dry weather had become quite unhelpful to bowlers, Hearne was clearly the best bowler apart from the incomparable Tom Richardson, and he was chosen to tour Australia for the only time. He did not disappoint despite the very hard pitches: with Richardson only once at his best Hearne had to shoulder a very heavy burden and did so very well, taking 20 wickets including 6 for 98 at the MCG. In 1898, Hearne was again magnificent, taking 222 wickets at a slightly lower cost than in 1896. Whilst, on difficult pitches without support, his excellent bowling did not reward Middlesex early on, in August, aided by Albert Trott, Middlesex won their last seven games to come second.

=== Decline ===
At this point, nobody knew how long Hearne could keep going. However, 1899 saw unmistakable signs of decline, for apart from early in the season on very helpful pitches, Hearne lost most of his sting. Despite a hat-trick in the first ever Test at Headingley that suggested he was still a great bowler, Hearne's haul of wickets declined from 222 to 127 and his average rose by fifty percent – a great decline even when the very dry weather after the first few games is considered.

In 1900, whilst he produced impressive performances against the two leading counties (Yorkshire and Lancashire), Hearne could not recover his form, and apart from a few reasonable performances for the MCC the year 1901 was disastrous, with his average in purely county matches blowing out to over 30 runs per wicket. 1902 – the first really wet summer since 1894 – was equally disappointing, with a succession of rain-affected pitches only rarely exploited and little evidence of his old skill on the few hard pitches. Consequently, Hearne disappeared from consideration for Test and other representative selection, even during his occasional recoveries of form.

=== Late career ===
In 1903 and 1904, Hearne seemed to recover his skill, supporting a formidable Middlesex batting side to give them their first official County Championship in the former year, and heading the averages in 1904 with several outstanding performances on difficult wickets. In 1905 he still bowled well, but 1906 was an absolute disaster and it seemed only a matter of time before Hearne was dropped. This opinion was barely dimmed by some great performances in late 1907 – recalling the vicious spin of the 1890s Hearne – and one superb performance against Yorkshire in 1908. By 1909, apart from a mechanical accuracy of length, there seemed nothing at all in Hearne's bowling.

Yet, 1910, after he was dropped early on, marked a remarkable return to form, getting on as much off-break as ever on the rain-spoiled wickets of a wet summer even at forty-three, and his length appearing to have only become more immaculate with greater experience. The exceptional summer of 1911 showed he had not lost his skill and vigour on hard wickets, with the consistency of his bowling being remarkable. Though he was perhaps good enough to play for England, he was probably ruled out at this point by age, which had already led the MCC to use him as their main bowler much less.

Hearne continued to play up to 1914 – though without the same success of 1910 and 1911 – taking his three thousandth wicket on the first day of 1914. When first-class cricket resumed in 1919, Hearne was fifty-two and clearly was too old to play a full season's cricket. He played two more first-class matches against weak opponents in 1921 and 1923, but never again in the Championship.

== Later life ==
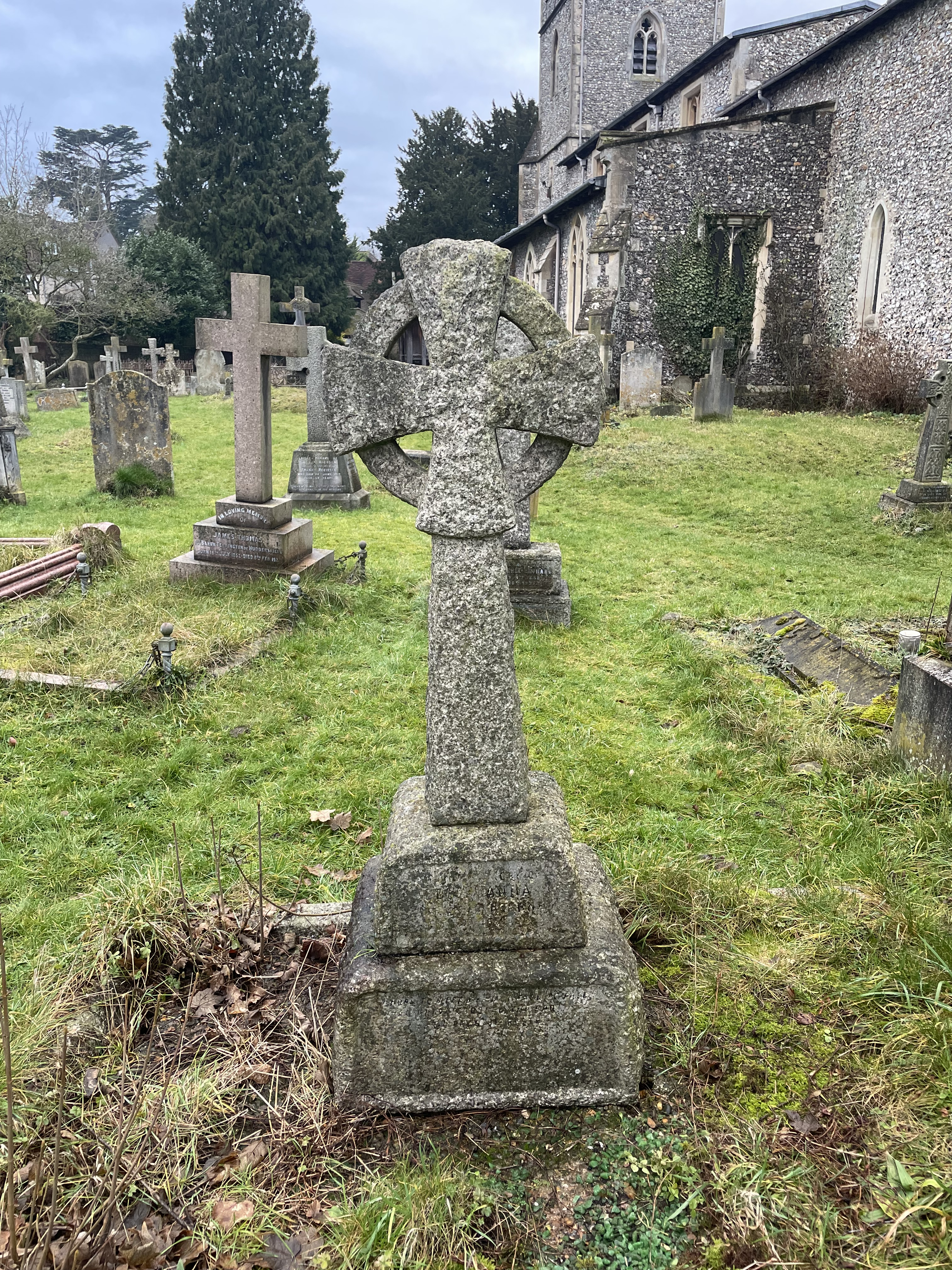
The grave of J.T. Hearne

In 1920, Hearne became the first professional cricketer to be elected to the Middlesex committee, a place he held until the end of the decade. During this period, he went on a number of tours to India and coached cricket at Oxford University until the middle 1930s, after which he retired. Jack Hearne died in his birthplace of Chalfont St Giles on 17 April 1944 and is buried at the Parish Church of St Giles.
