= William A. Harper =

American painter

William A. Harper (1873 – 1910) was a Canadian-born artist best known for his landscape paintings, and is represented in both the Metropolitan Museum of Art in New York City and the National Museum of African American History in Washington, D.C. Harper was born in the village of Canfield, near Cayuga, Ontario, Canada, and immigrated to Illinois in 1885. He graduated from the Art Institute of Chicago (“AIC”) in 1901, and subsequently studied at the Académie Julian in Paris, France. Harper's paintings were regularly accepted in juried exhibitions of the AIC and the Society of Western Artists and were acknowledged with multiple awards.

== Early life and education ==
Harper was born in the village of Canfield, near Cayuga, Ontario, Canada, the grandson of escaped slaves, and immigrated to Illinois in 1885 where he attended a college preparatory school in Jacksonville. He enrolled in the AIC in 1895, serving as a janitor there to put himself through school. Harper spent summers working and painting at the Eagle's Nest Art Colony near Oregon, Illinois where he was the protégé of members of the Colony, including Lorado Taft, Charles Francis Browne, and William Wendt. Harper graduated from the AIC with second honors in 1901.

== Career ==
Harper accepted a job in Houston, Texas in 1901 as drawing instructor in the Houston public schools.

In 1903, he traveled to Europe, initially painting with William Wendt in Cornwall, England. In the fall of 1903, Harper enrolled at the Académie Julian in Paris, France, a venue favored by many AIC graduates. While in Paris, he took the opportunity to copy well-known paintings at the Louvre, and to explore and sketch the French countryside. In the spring of 1904, Harper and Charles Francis Browne travelled south of Paris to the area of Barbizon to paint. By 1905, he was back in Chicago, once again working at the AIC to support his painting career, this time as a night watchman.

During the years following his graduation from the AIC, Harper's paintings were regularly accepted in the annual juried exhibition of works by Chicago artists, jointly managed by the AIC and the Municipal Art League of Chicago and in the exhibitions of the Society of Western Artists (of which he was a member). He won the Municipal Art League prize in 1905 and the Young Fortnightly Club award in 1908. Harper's paintings born of his time in Cornwall and in France figure prominently in the exhibitions beginning in 1904 and reflect the influence of the Barbizon school on his work.

Harper made a second trip to France in 1907, this time studying with Henry Ossawa Tanner, the respected American expatriate artist, who had homes in both Paris and the north of France. Harper continued to paint in the French countryside, and under Tanner's influence his work began to take on a more impressionistic style.

By 1908, Harper's health was failing, and he moved to Cuernavaca, Mexico. He nevertheless continued to paint until his death in 1910 from consumption (tuberculosis). Following his death, the AIC featured a solo exhibition of sixty of Harper's paintings, “certainly the first major museum show for a black artist in Chicago, if not anywhere in the United States.”

== Museums / Collections ==
Harper's works are in numerous museums and important collections including:

- Metropolitan Museum of Art in New York City
- National Museum of African American History in Washington, Washington, D.C.
- Columbus Museum, Columbus, Georgia
- National Gallery of Art, Washington, D.C.
- The DuSable Museum of African American History
- Flint Institute of Arts, Flint, Michigan
- Christine M. Schwartz Collection, Chicago, IL
- The Eagle's Nest Art Collection, Oregon Library, Oregon, Illinois
- The Harmon and Harriet Kelley Foundation for The Arts, San Antonio, Texas

For more detailed information on William A. Harper, see: http://www.williamaharper.com/
