= Henry Ossawa Tanner =

American painter (1859–1937)

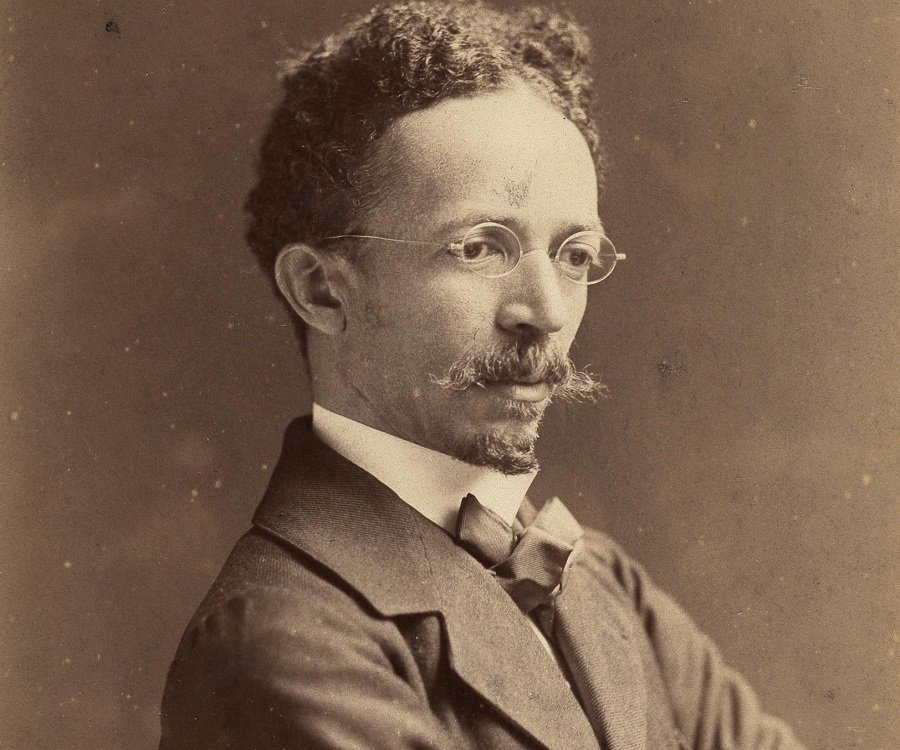
- Tanner in 1907 by Frederick Gutekunst
- Born: June 21, 1859; Pittsburgh, Pennsylvania, U.S.
- Died: May 25, 1937 (aged 77); Paris, France
- Education: Studied with Thomas Eakins at the Pennsylvania Academy of the Fine Arts. Later studied with Jean Paul Laurens and Jean-Joseph Benjamin-Constant at the Académie Julian in Paris, France.
- Known for: Painting and drawing
- Notable work: The Banjo Lesson, 1893; The Resurrection of Lazarus, 1896; The Annunciation, 1898; Nicodemus Visiting Christ, 1899; Flight into Egypt, 1899
- Movement: American Realism, French Academic, Impressionism, Symbolism
- Spouse: Jessie Macauley Olssen (m. 1899; died 1925)
- Children: 1
- Awards: Pennsylvania Academy of the Fine Arts' Lippincott Prize, 1900; Silver medal, Exposition Universelle, Paris, 1900
- Elected: Elected a member of the National Academy of Design, 1910. Made an honorary chevalier of the Order of the Legion of Honor, 1923.
- Patrons: Joseph Crane Hartzell, Rodman Wanamaker, Atherton Curtis

Henry Ossawa Tanner (June 21, 1859 – May 25, 1937) was an American artist who spent much of his career in France. He became the first African-American painter to gain international acclaim. Tanner moved to Paris, France, in 1891 to study at the Académie Julian and gained acclaim in French artistic circles. In 1923, the French government elected Tanner chevalier of the Legion of Honor.

== Early life ==
Henry Ossawa Tanner was born in Pittsburgh, Pennsylvania. His father Benjamin Tucker Tanner (1835–1923) became a bishop in the African Methodist Episcopal Church (AME), the first independent black denomination in the United States. He was educated at Avery College and Western Theological Seminary in Pittsburgh, and developed a literary career. In addition, he was a political activist, supporting abolition of slavery. Henry Tanner's mother Sarah Elizabeth Tanner may have been born into slavery in Virginia. Two different stories have emerged concerning her living in freedom; in one, her father drives the family from Winchester, Virginia to "the free state of Pennsylvania" in an ox cart. In the other, she escapes as a refugee to the North via the Underground Railroad. There she met and married Benjamin Tucker Tanner.

Tanner was the first of nine children; and two of his brothers, Benjamin and Horace, died in infancy. One of his sisters, Halle Tanner Dillon Johnson, was the first woman to be certified to practice medicine in Alabama. His parents gave him a middle name that commemorated the struggle at Osawatomie between pro- and anti-slavery partisans. The family moved from Pittsburgh to Philadelphia when Tanner was a teenager. There his father became a friend of Frederick Douglass, sometimes supporting him, sometimes criticizing. Robert Douglass, Jr., a successful black artist in Philadelphia, was an early neighbor of the Tanner family, and Tanner wrote that he "used to pass and always stopped to look at his pictures in the window." When Tanner was about 13 years old, he saw a landscape painter working in Fairmount Park, where he was walking with his father. He decided that he wanted to be a painter.

== Education ==
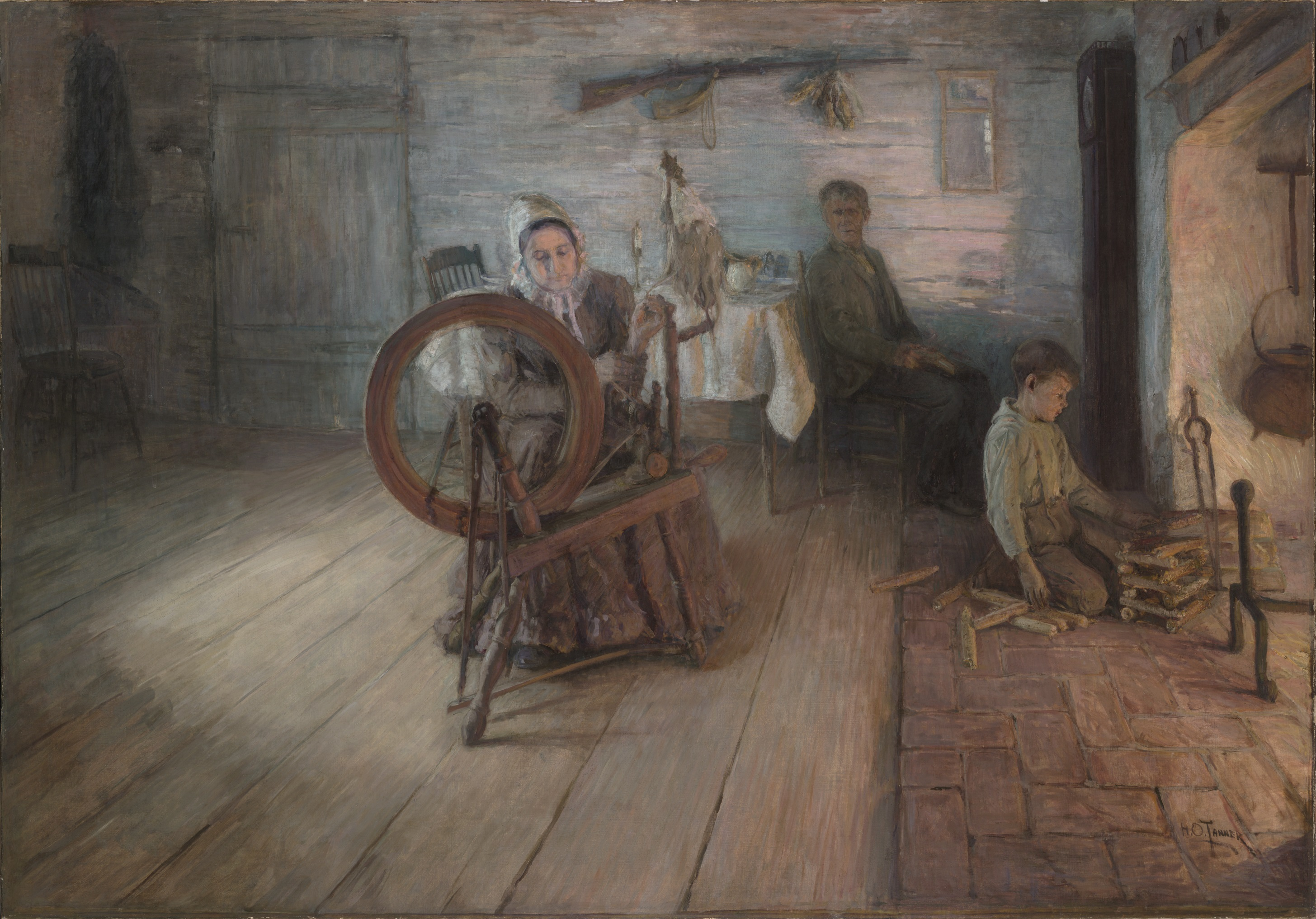
Spinning by Firelight, 1894

Although many white artists refused to accept an African-American apprentice, in 1879 Tanner enrolled at the Pennsylvania Academy of the Fine Arts in Philadelphia, becoming the only black student. His decision to attend the school came at a time when art academies increasingly focused on study from live models rather than plaster casts. Thomas Eakins, a professor at the Pennsylvania Academy, was one of the first American artists to promote new approaches to artistic education including increased study from live models, discussion of anatomy in classes of both male and female students, and dissections of cadavers to teach anatomy. Eakins's progressive approach to art education had a profound effect on Tanner. The young artist was one of Eakins' favorite students; two decades after Tanner left the Academy, Eakins painted his portrait.

At the Academy, Tanner befriended artists with whom he kept in contact throughout the rest of his life, most notably Robert Henri, one of the founders of the Ashcan School. During a relatively short time at the Academy, Tanner developed a thorough knowledge of anatomy and the skill to express his understanding of the weight and structure of the human figure on the canvas.

Tanner's artistic studies were disrupted by illness, which was reported in November 1881 and said to have persisted into the following summer, when Tanner spent time recovering in the Adirondack Mountains.

Tanner's teachers included Thomas Eakins (American realism, photography), Thomas Hovenden (American realism), Benjamin Constant (orientalist paintings and portraits, French academic) and Jean-Paul Laurens (history painting, French academic).

== Painting style ==
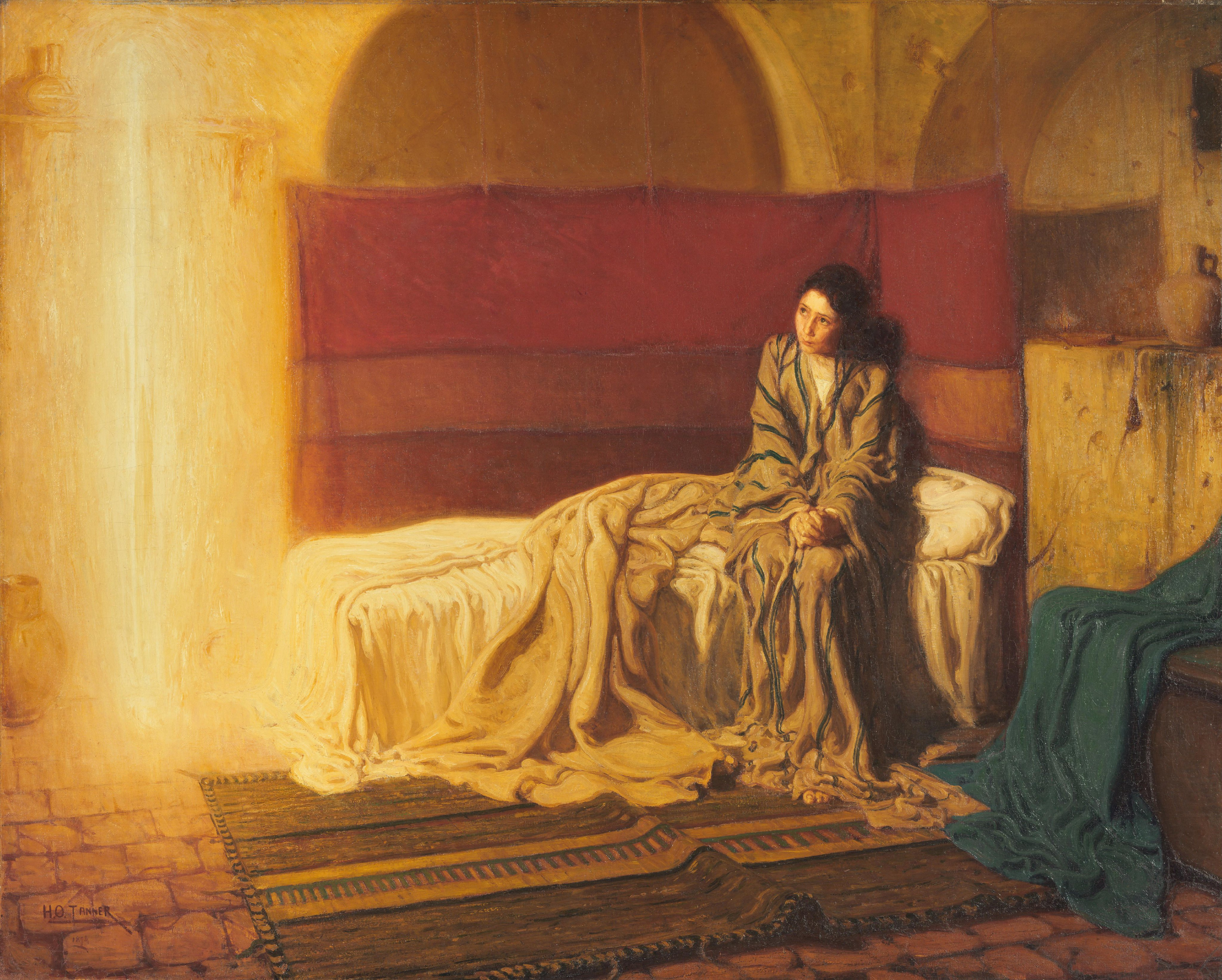
The Annunciation, 1898, Philadelphia Museum of Art

Tanner painted landscapes, religious subjects, and scenes of daily life in a realistic style that echoed that of Eakins. While works like The Banjo Lesson depicted everyday scenes of African American life, Tanner later painted religious subjects. It is likely that Tanner's father, a minister in the African Methodist Episcopal Church, was a formative influence for him.

Tanner was not limited to one specific approach to painting and drawing. His works reflect at times meticulous attention to detail and loose, expressive brushstrokes in others. Often both methods are employed simultaneously. Tanner was also interested in the effects that color could have in a painting. Warmer compositions such as The Resurrection of Lazarus (1896) and The Annunciation (1898) express the intensity and fire of religious moments, and the elation of transcendence between the divine and humanity. Other paintings emphasize cool hues, which became dominant in his work after the mid-1890s. A palette of indigo and turquoise—referred to as the "Tanner blues"—characterizes works such as The Three Marys (1910), Gateway (1912) and The Arch (1919). Works such as The Good Shepherd (1903) and Return of the Holy Women (1904) evoke a feeling of somber religiosity and introspection.

Tanner often experimented with light in his works, which at times adds symbolic meaning. In The Annunciation (1898), for example, the archangel Gabriel is represented as a column of light that forms, together with the shelf in the upper left corner, a cross.

== Issues of racism ==
Although Tanner gained confidence as an artist and began to sell his work, he faced racism working as a professional artist in Philadelphia. In his autobiography, The Story of an Artist's Life, Tanner described the burden of racism:

I was extremely timid and to be made to feel that I was not wanted, although in a place where I had every right to be, even months afterwards caused me sometimes weeks of pain. Every time any one of these disagreeable incidents came into my mind, my heart sank, and I was anew tortured by the thought of what I had endured, almost as much as the incident itself.

In the hope of earning enough money to travel to Europe, Tanner operated a photography studio in Atlanta during the late 1880s. The venture was unsuccessful. During this period Tanner met Bishop Joseph Crane Hartzell, a trustee of Clark College (now Clark Atlanta University). Hartzell and his wife befriended Tanner, became his patrons, and recommended him for a teaching job at the college. Tanner taught drawing at Clark College for a short period.

== 1891 ==
Tanner set out for Rome by way of Liverpool and Paris on the ship City of Chester on 4 January 1891. He found Paris to his liking and discovered the Académie Julian, where he began his studies in France. He also joined the American Art Students Club. Paris was a welcome escape for Tanner; within French art circles, race mattered little. Tanner discovered the Paris Salon and set a goal to get his artwork accepted.

== The Banjo Lesson ==
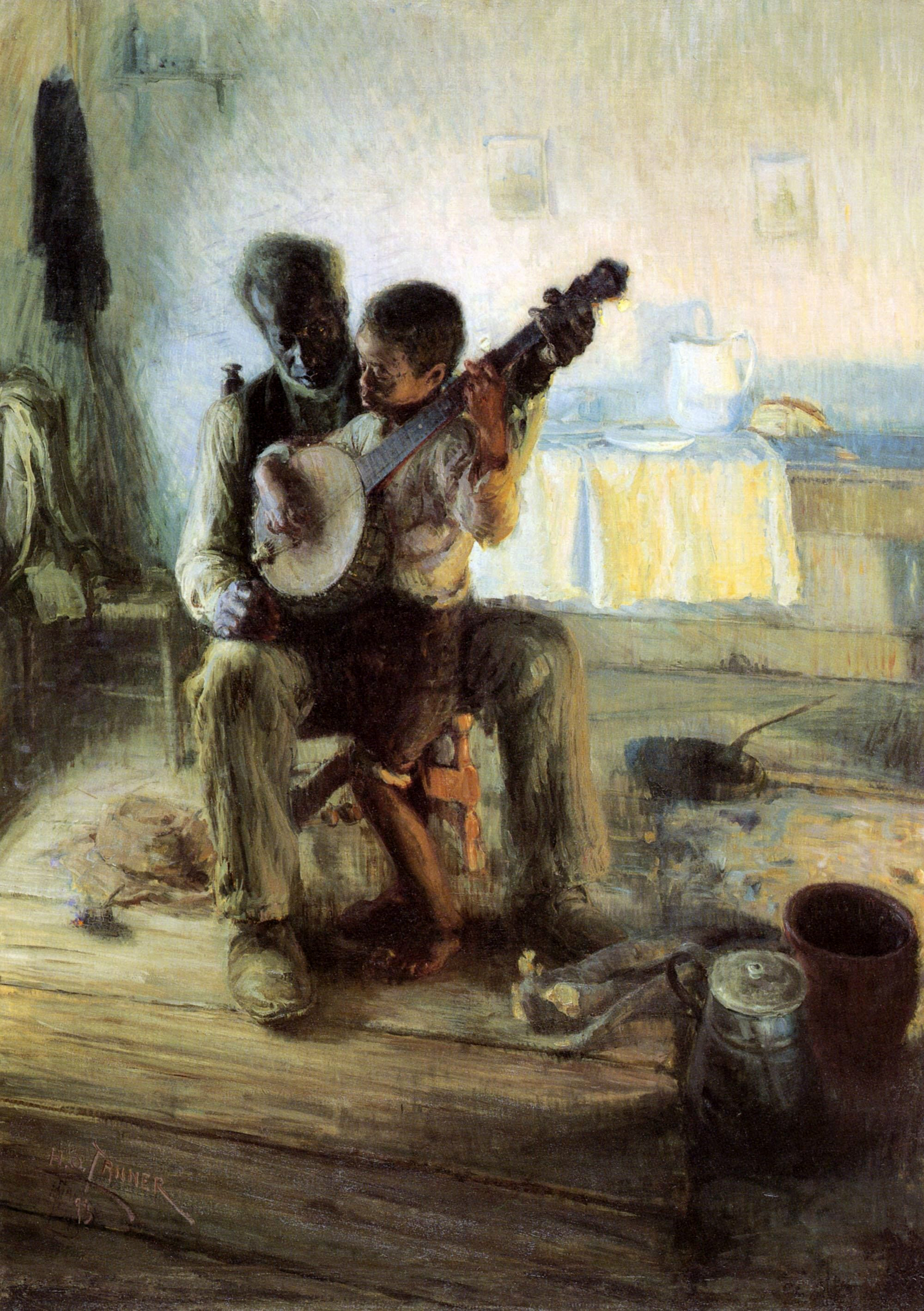
The Banjo Lesson, 1893

On a return visit to the United States in 1893, Tanner presented "The American Negro in Art", an essay, at the World's Congress on Africa in Chicago, and painted The Banjo Lesson, one of his most recognized works that began as a series of sketches of Black people living in Appalachia. The painting shows an elderly black man teaching a boy, assumed to be his grandson, how to play the banjo. The image of a black man playing the banjo appears throughout American art of the late 19th century.

== Life in Paris ==
Except for occasional brief returns home, Tanner spent the rest of his life in Paris. He acclimated quickly to Parisian life, and became friends with Atherton Curtis. He was part of a community of artists in Mount Kisco, New York for six months in 1902, at the behest of Curtis, and returned the following winter.

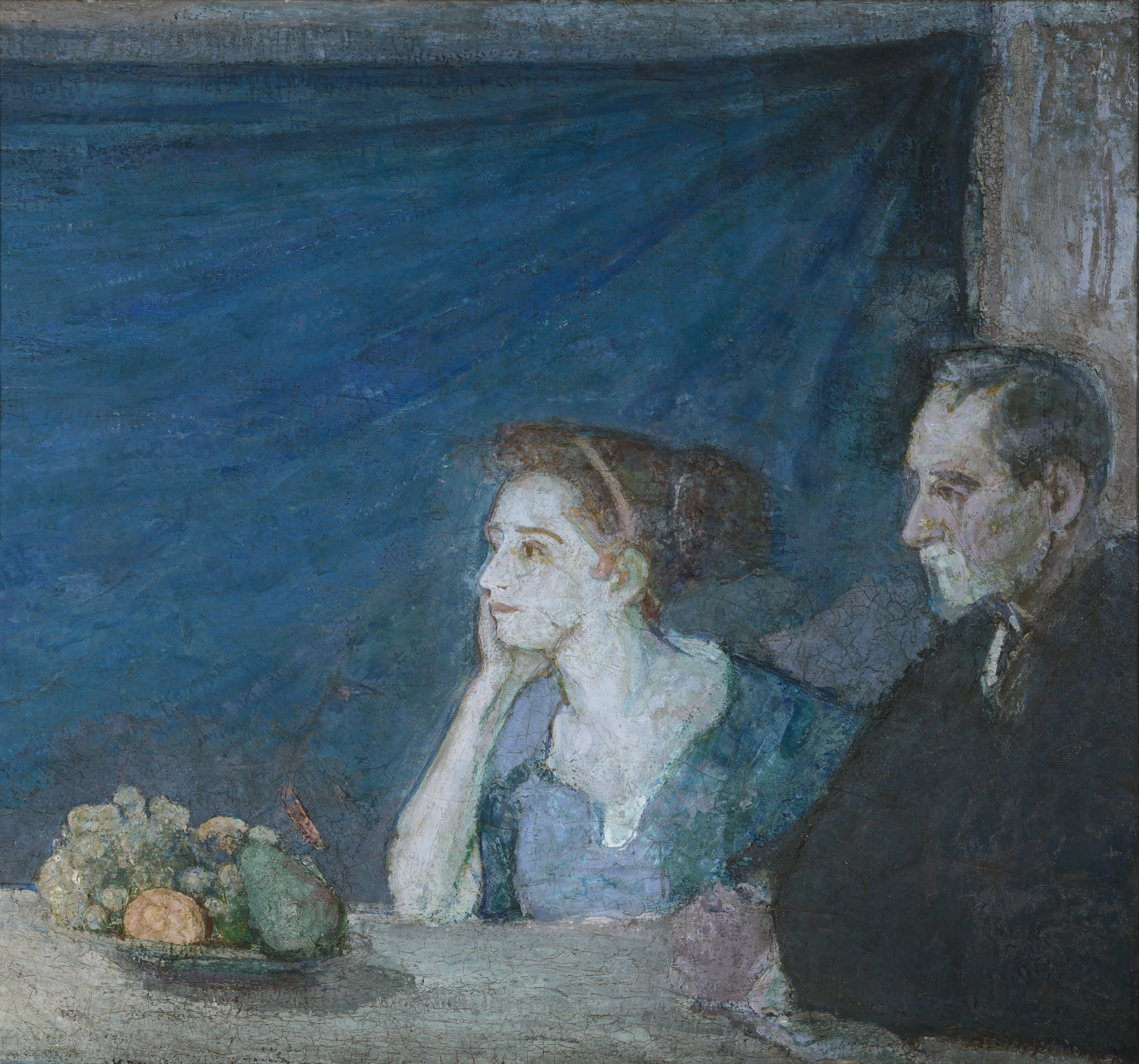
Atherton Curtis with his wife, by Tanner.

In Paris, Tanner continued his studies under renowned artists such as Jean Joseph Benjamin Constant and Jean-Paul Laurens. With their guidance, he began to establish a reputation in France. He settled at the Étaples art colony in Normandy. There he was introduced to many artists whose works would affect his approach to art. At the Louvre, he encountered and studied the works of Gustave Courbet, Jean-Baptiste Chardin and Louis Le Nain. These artists had painted scenes of ordinary people in their environment, and the influence in Tanner's work is noticeable. That of Courbet's The Stone Breakers (1850; destroyed) can be seen in the similarities in Tanner's The Young Sabot Maker (1895). Both paintings explore the themes of apprenticeship and manual labor.

Earlier, Tanner had painted marine scenes of man's struggle with the sea, but by 1895 he was creating mostly religious works. His shift to painting biblical scenes occurred as he was undergoing a spiritual struggle. In a letter he wrote to his parents on Christmas 1896, he stated, "I have made up my mind to serve Him [God] more faithfully." A transitional work from this period is the recently rediscovered painting of a fishing boat tossed on the waves, which is held by the Smithsonian American Art Museum.

Tanner's painting Daniel in the Lions' Den was accepted into the 1896 Salon. Later that year he painted The Resurrection of Lazarus (1896, Musée d'Orsay, Paris) that was purchased by the French government after winning the third-place medal at the 1897 Salon. Upon seeing The Resurrection of Lazarus, Rodman Wanamaker, an art critic and a "major patron of contemporary religious art," offered to pay all the expenses for Tanner to visit the Middle East. Wanamaker felt that any serious painter of biblical scenes needed to see the environment firsthand and that a painter of Tanner's caliber was well worth the investment. Tanner accepted Wanamaker's offer. For four months in 1897 and, again, for six months in 1898-1899, he trekked a popular tourist route through Palestine and North Africa, pitching his tent in the arid region.

Tanner did not exhibit at the Salon in 1907, due to eye strain, but in 1908 entered The Wise and Foolish Virgins which he worked on in 1906, 1907 and finished in 1908. Newspapers don't record a Salon entry for 1909; but he focused his 1908 energy on a one-man exhibition of his artwork in New York, and the 1909 papers continued to talk about that event. Tanner may have avoided displaying at the Salon 1910, 1911, 1912, and 1913.

In 1914, Tanner's mother died, World War I started, and he returned to the Paris Salon after "several years of absence," bringing his 1912 painting Christ in the House of Lazarus and Mary. He had remarked in 1910 "that he would not exhibit in the salon again as they had stuck his picture into a corner which everyone knows is almost an insult." French artists were upset over a U.S. tariff on their paintings, and said to be taking revenge in the Salon.

== Later years ==
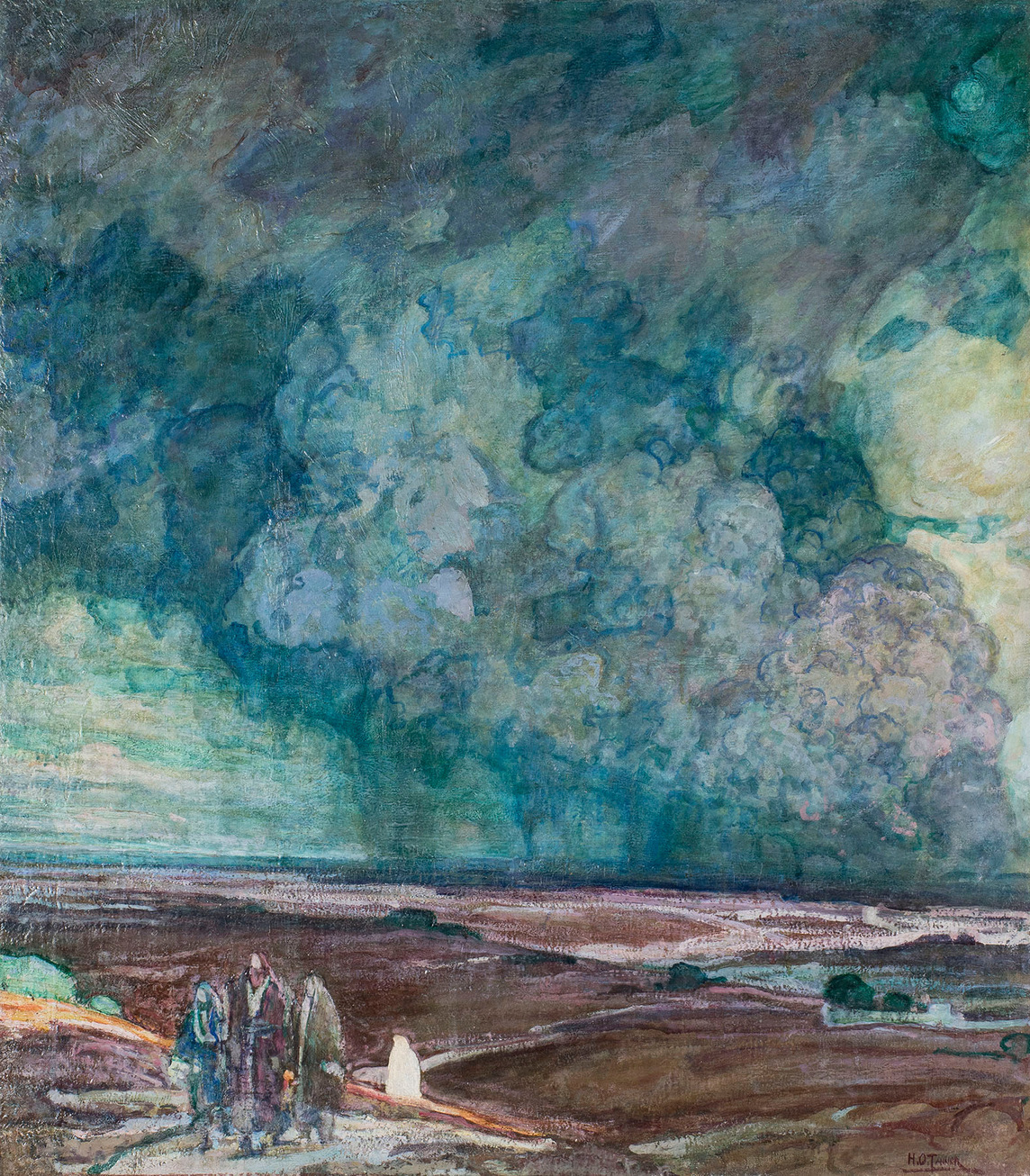
Sodom and Gomorrah, 1920

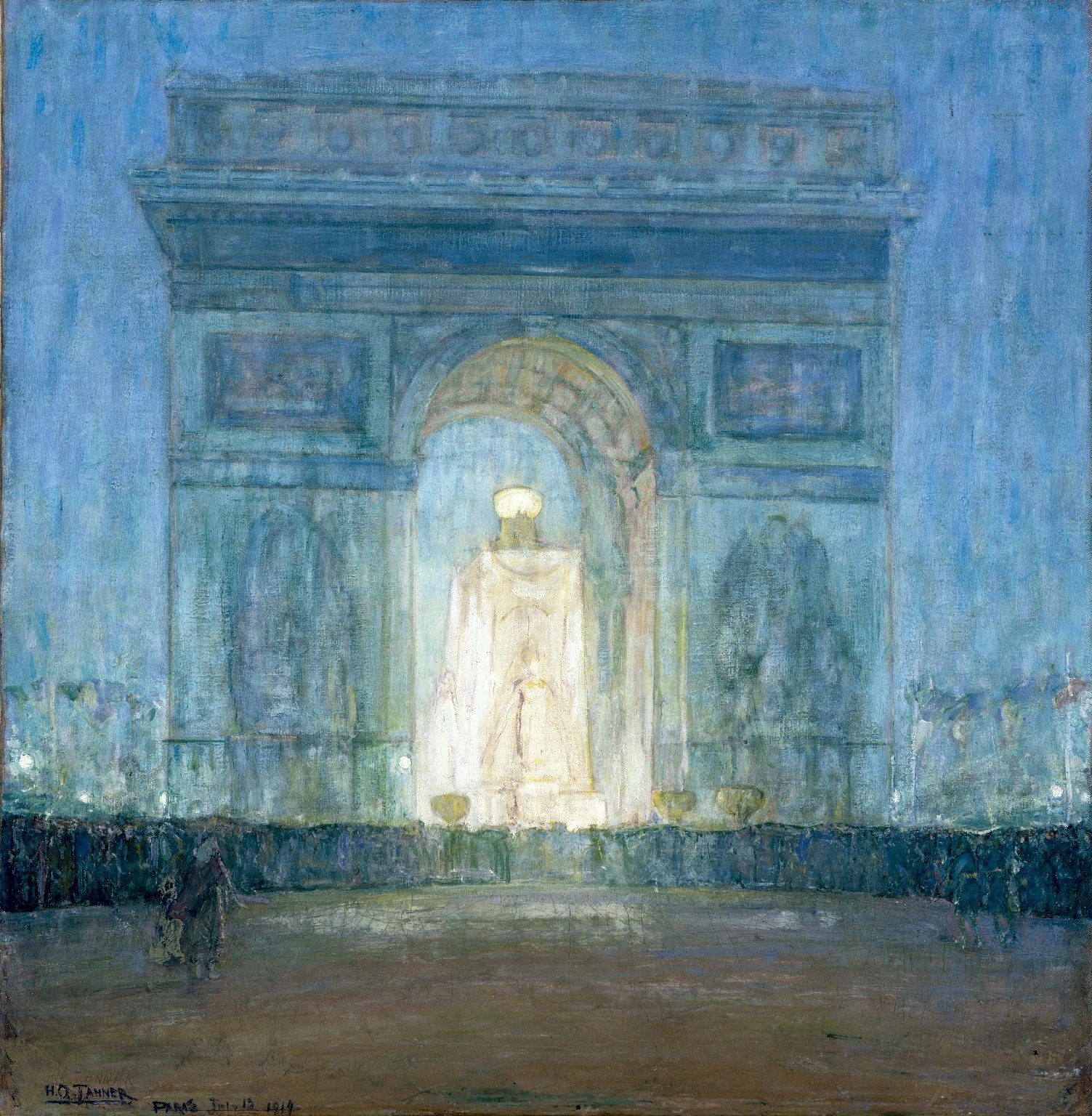
The Arch, 1919.

During World War I, Tanner worked for the Red Cross Public Information Department, during which time he also painted images from the front lines of the war. His works featuring African-American troops were rare during the war. In 1923 the French state made him a knight of the Legion of Honour for his work as an artist.

Tanner met with fellow African-American artist Palmer Hayden in Paris circa 1927. They discussed artistic technique and he gave Hayden advice on interacting with French society. He was also an inspiration to other artists studying in France, including Hale Woodruff, Romare Bearden, and other artists associated with Black Abstractionism.

Several of Tanner's paintings were purchased by Atlanta art collector J. J. Haverty, who founded Haverty Furniture Co. and was instrumental in establishing the High Museum of Art. Tanner's Étaples Fisher Folk is among several paintings from the Haverty collection now in the High Museum's permanent collection.

Tanner died peacefully at his home in Paris, France, on May 25, 1937. He is buried at Sceaux Cemetery in Sceaux, Hauts-de-Seine, a suburb of Paris.

== Marriage and family ==
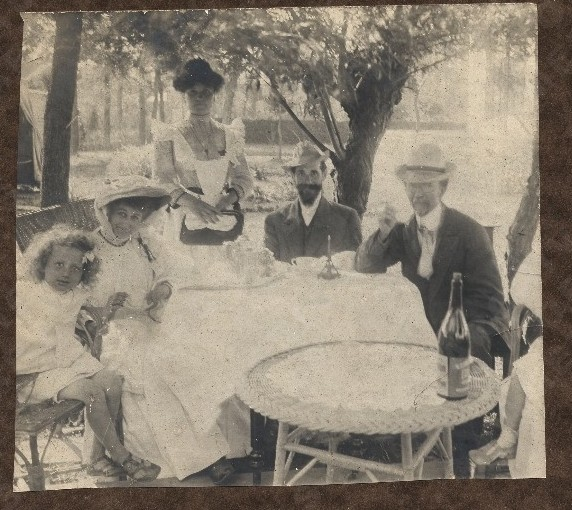
The Tanner family at home in France. Handwritten note on verso identifies the individuals seated at the table as: Jesse Tanner, Mrs. Tanner, Myron G. Barlow, Henry Ossawa Tanner.

In 1899 he married Jessie Olsson, a Swedish-American opera singer. A contemporary, Virginia Walker Course, described their relationship as one of equal talents, but racist attitudes insisted the relationship was unequal:

Fan, did you ever hear of a miss [sic] Olsson of Portland? She has a beautiful voice I believe and came to Paris to cultivate it and she has married a darkey artist ... He is an awefully [sic] talented man but he is black. ... She seems like a well educated girl and really very nice but it makes me sick to see a cultivated woman marry a man like that. I don't know his work but he is very talented they say.

Jessie Tanner died in 1925, twelve years before her husband, and he grieved her deeply through the 1920s. He sold the family home in Les Charmes where they had been so happy together. They are buried next to each other in Sceaux, Hauts-de-Seine.

They had a son, Jesse, who survived Tanner at his death.

== Friends and colleagues ==
Tanner's friends and colleagues included Hermon MacNeil (sculptor), Hermann Dudley Murphy (landscapes), Paul Gauguin (synthetism), Myron G. Barlow (genre painting), Charles Hovey Pepper (Japanese style woodblocks). Charles Filiger (symbolist), Armand Séguin (Post-Impressionism), Jan Verkade (Post-Impressionism, Christian symbolist), Paul Sérusier (abstract art), and Gustave Loiseau (Post-Impressionism).

== Legacy ==
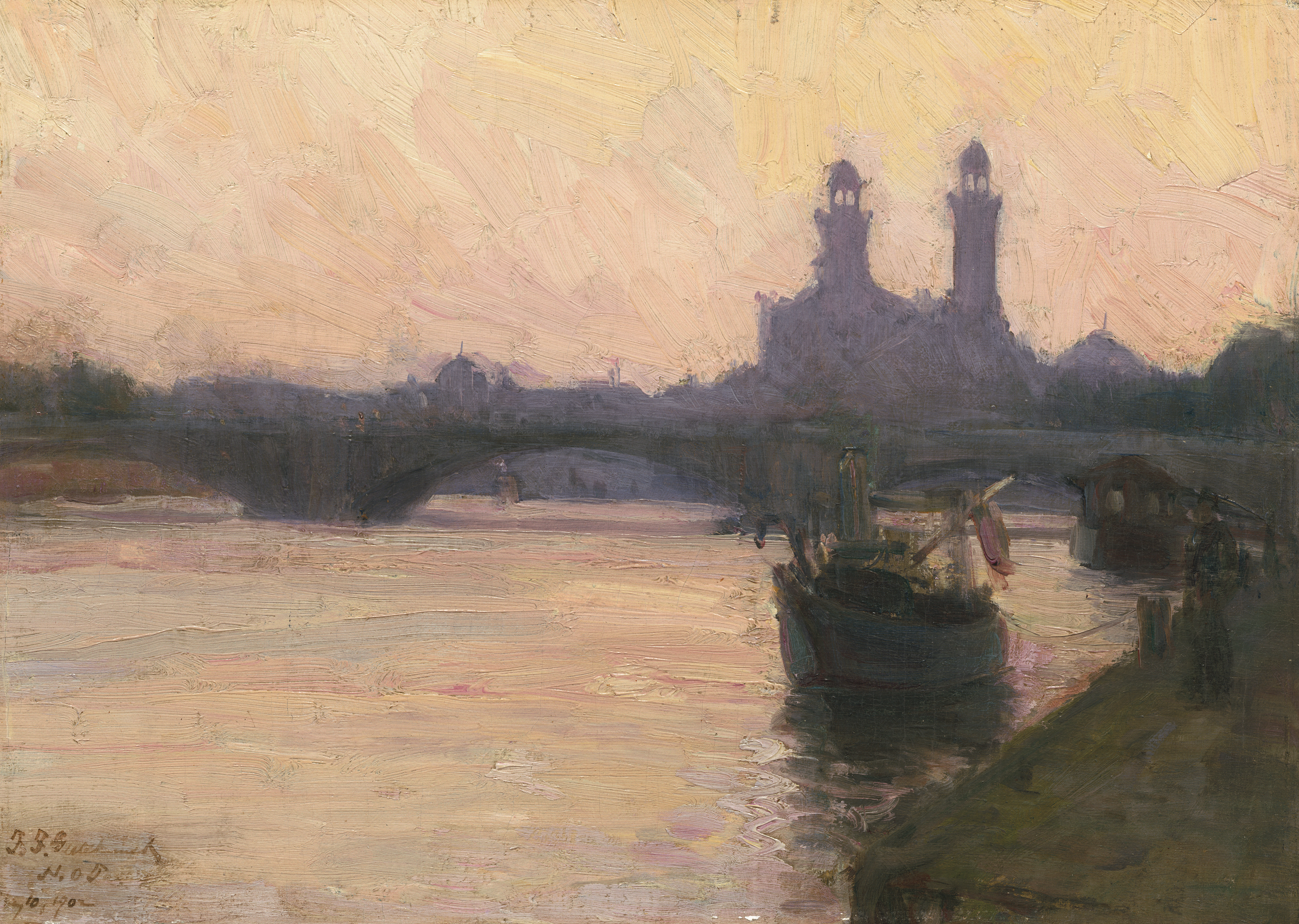
Tanner's The Seine (c. 1902), one of three paintings by African Americans on display in 2012 in the National Gallery of Art's American Art galleries.

Tanner's work was influential during his career; he has been called "the greatest African American painter to date." The early paintings of William Edouard Scott, who studied with Tanner in France, show the influence of Tanner's technique. In addition, some of Norman Rockwell's illustrations deal with the same themes and compositions that Tanner pursued. Rockwell's proposed cover of the Literary Digest in 1922, for example, shows an older black man playing the banjo for his grandson. The light sources are nearly identical to those in Tanner's Banjo Lesson. A fireplace illuminates the right side of the picture, while natural light enters from the left. Both use similar objects as well such as the clothing, chair, crumpled hat on the floor. Some other major artists Tanner mentored include William A. Harper and Hale Woodruff.

Tanner's Sand Dunes at Sunset, Atlantic City (c. 1885; oil on canvas) hangs in the Green Room at the White House; it is the first painting by an African-American artist to have been purchased for the permanent collection of the White House. The painting is a landscape with a "view across the cool gray of a shadowed beach to dunes made pink by the late afternoon sunlight. A low haze over the water partially hides the sun." It was bought for $100,000 by the White House Endowment Fund during the Bill Clinton administration from Dr. Rae Alexander-Minter, grandniece of the artist.

His correspondence with Curtis between 1904 and 1937 is held at the Smithsonian Institution.

Tanner's work was included in the 2015 exhibition We Speak: Black Artists in Philadelphia, 1920s-1970s at the Woodmere Art Museum.

== Awards ==
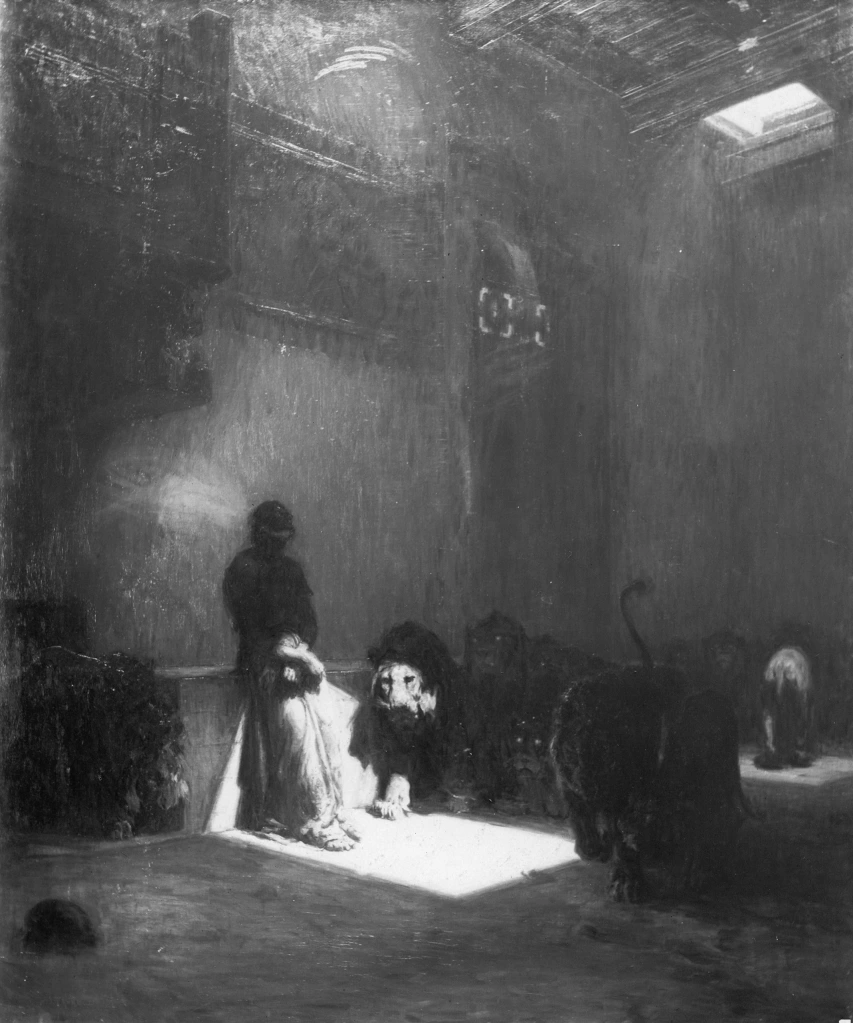
Photo of Tanner's lost painting, Daniel in the Lion's Den, 1896.

- 1895, Atlanta, Cotton States and International Exposition: bronze medal for The Bagpipe Lesson.
- 1896, Salon: honorable mention for Daniel in the Lions' Den
- 1897, Salon: third class medal for Raising of Lazarus
- 1899, Philadelphia Academy of Fine Art: Walter Lippincott prize for Christ and Nicodemus on a Rooftop
- 1900, Paris Exposition: silver medal for Daniel in the Lions' Den
- 1901, Buffalo Exposition: silver medal for Daniel in the Lions' Den
- 1904, St. Louis Exposition: silver medal for Daniel in the Lions' Den
- 1906, Salon: second class medal for The Disciples at Emmaus
- 1906, Art Institute of Chicago, Norman Wait Harris silver medal for The Two Disciples at the Tomb
- 1915, Panama–Pacific International Exposition, San Francisco: gold medal for Christ at the Home of Lazarus (This link is to the study, not the final painting).
- 1922, France: Knighthood of the Legion of Honor for his efforts in World War I, part of the Red Cross
- 1927, New York, National Arts Club: bronze medal for Flight into Egypt (At the Gates)
- 1930, New York City, Grand Central Art Gallery: Walter L. Clark prize for Etaples Fisher Folk

== Exhibitions ==
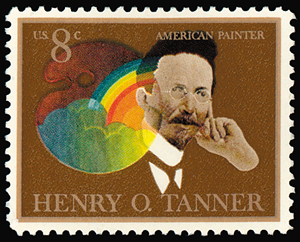
1973 U.S. commemorative stamp honoring Tanner.

- 1972: The Art of Henry Ossawa Tanner. Glen Falls, New York: The Hyde Collection.
- 1972: 19th Century American Landscape. New York: Metropolitan Museum of Art.
- 1976: Two Centuries of Black American Art. Los Angeles County Museum of Art.
- 1989: Black Art Ancestral Legacy: The African Impulse in African-American Art. Dallas Museum of Art.
- 1993: Revisiting the White City: American Art at the 1893 World's Fair
- 2010: Henry Ossawa Tanner and His Contemporaries, Des Moines Art Center (December–February 2011).
- 2012: Henry Ossawa Tanner: Modern Spirit, Pennsylvania Academy of the Fine Arts, Philadelphia (January–April), then to Cincinnati Art Museum (May–September) and to Houston Museum of Fine Arts (October–January 2013)

== Selected works ==
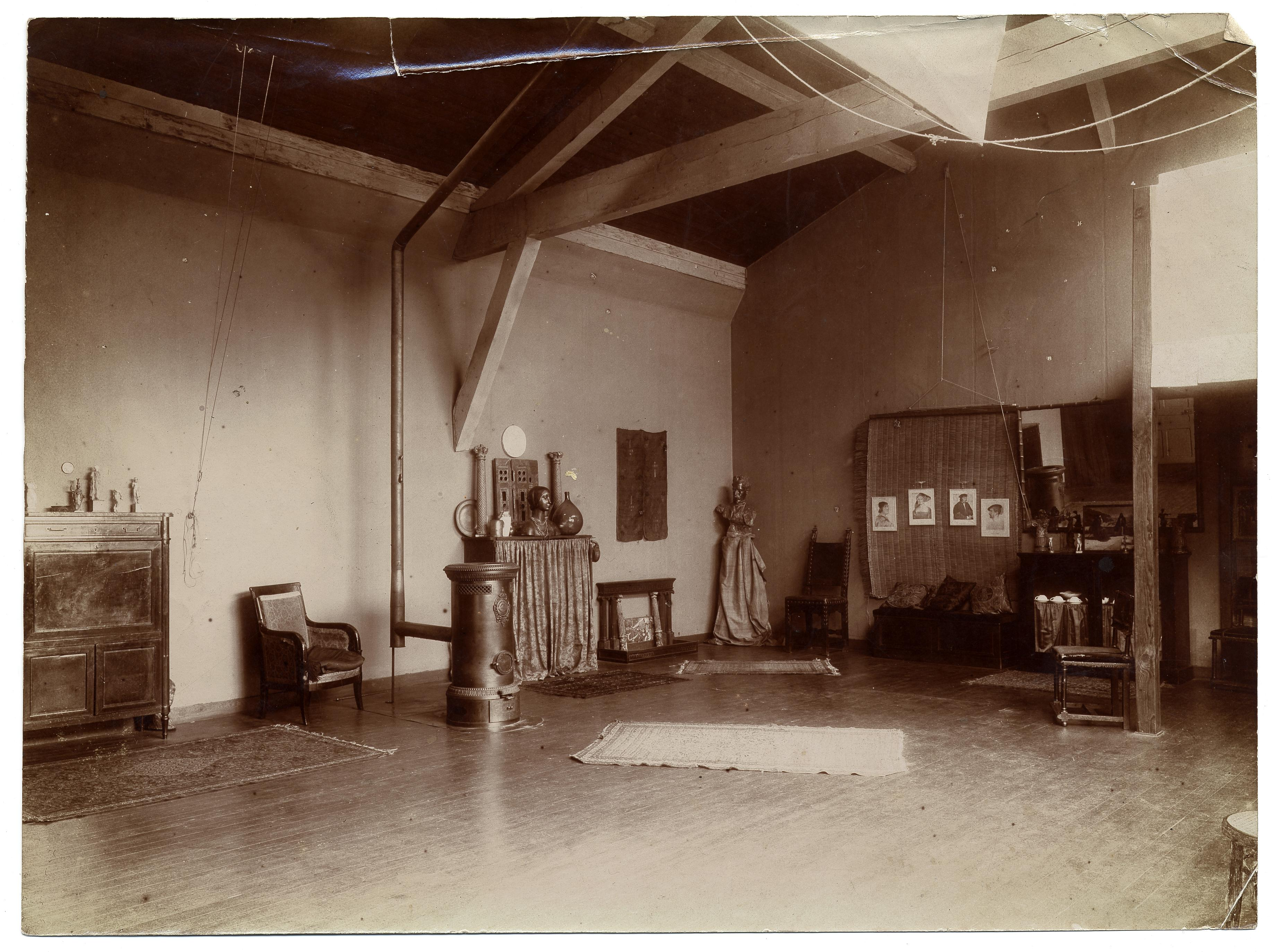
Tanner's studio

- Seascape-Jetty (c. 1876–78)
- Pomp at the Zoo (1880). Private Collection
- Joachim Leaving the Temple (c. 1882–1888). Baltimore Museum of Art
- Boy and Sheep Lying under a Tree (1881). Private Collection (On display at the Philadelphia Museum of Art)
- Sand Dunes at Sunset, Atlantic City (1886). Estate of Sadie T. M. Alexander (On permanent display at the White House)
- The Bagpipe Lesson (1893). Hampton University Museum, Virginia
- The Banjo Lesson (1893). Hampton University Museum, Virginia
- The Thankful Poor (1894). Art Bridges
- The Young Sabot Maker (1895). The Nelson-Atkins Museum of Art, Kansas City, Missouri
- Daniel in the Lions' Den (1895). Los Angeles County Museum of Art
- The Resurrection of Lazarus (1896). Musée d'Orsay, Paris
- Bishop Benjamin Tucker Tanner (1897). Baltimore Museum of Art
- Lions in the Desert (c. 1897–1900). Smithsonian American Art Museum
- The Annunciation (1898). Philadelphia Museum of Art, W.P. Wilstach Collection
- Moonlight Landscape (1898–1900). Muscarelle Museum of Art, Williamsburg, VA.
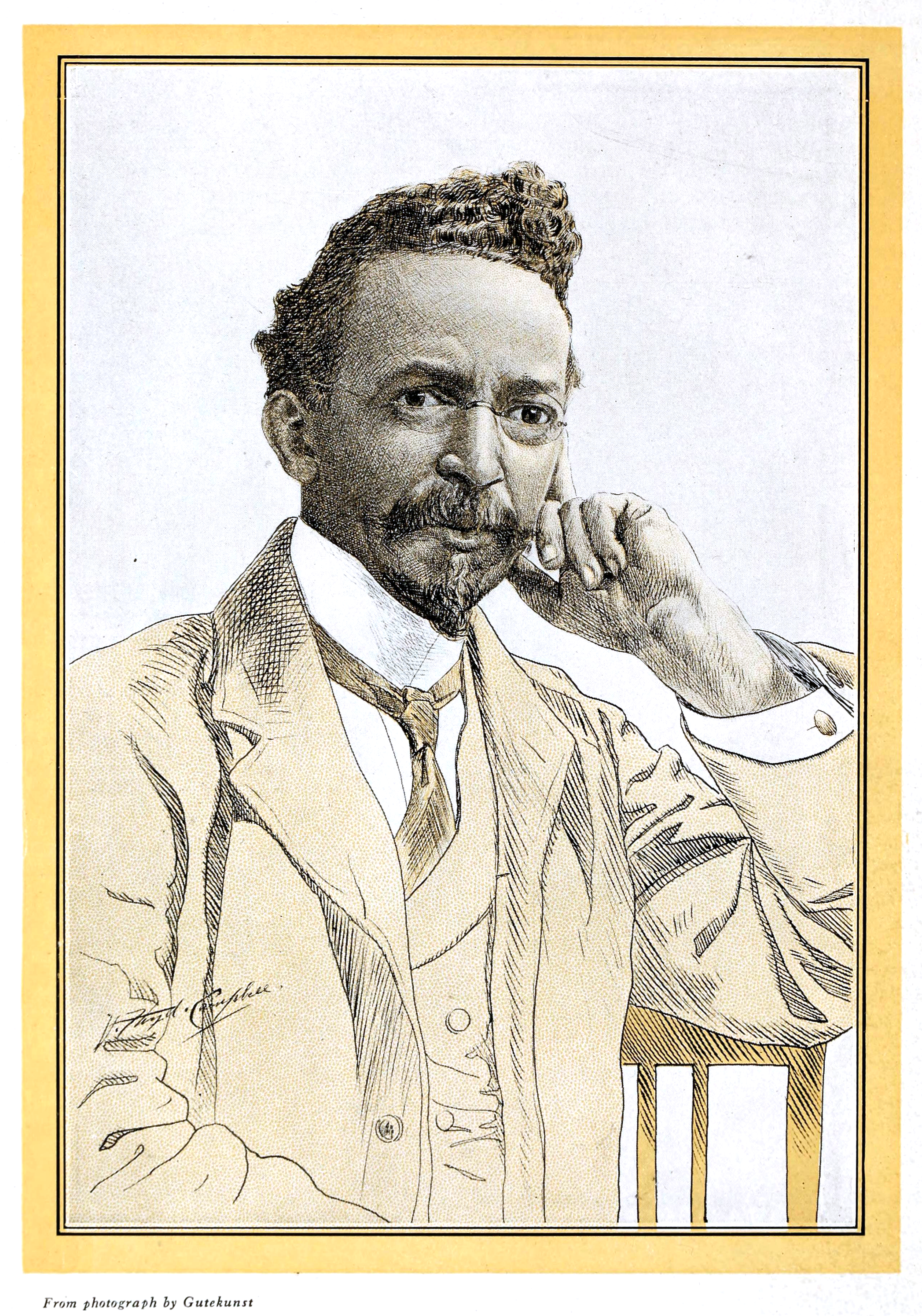
- Portrait of Tanner by V. Floyd Campbell
  The Good Shepherd (1903). Jane Voorhees Zimmerli Art Museum, Rutgers University
- Return of the Holy Women (1904). Cedar Rapids Art Gallery, Iowa
- Two Disciples at the Tomb (1905–06). Art Institute of Chicago
- The Visitation (1909–10). Kalamazoo Institute of Arts
- The Holy Family (1909–10). Muskegon Museum of Art, Michigan, Hackley Picture Fund
- Moroccan Scene (about 1912). Birmingham Museum of Art, Alabama
- Palace of Justice, Tangier (1912–13). Smithsonian American Art Museum
- Scene in Cairo. Mabee-Gerrer Museum of Art, Shawnee, Oklahoma

=== Other works ===
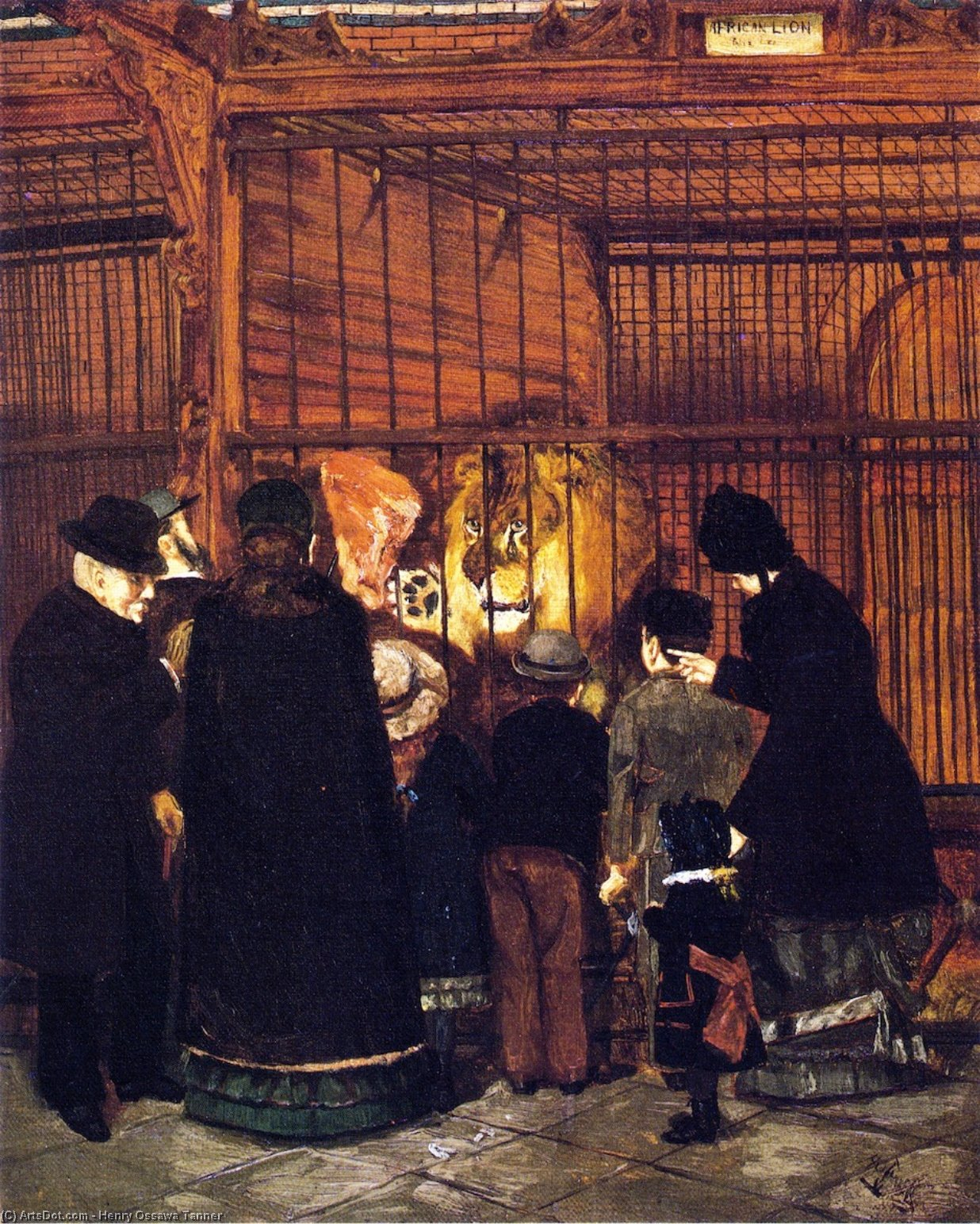
Pomp at the zoo, circa 1880

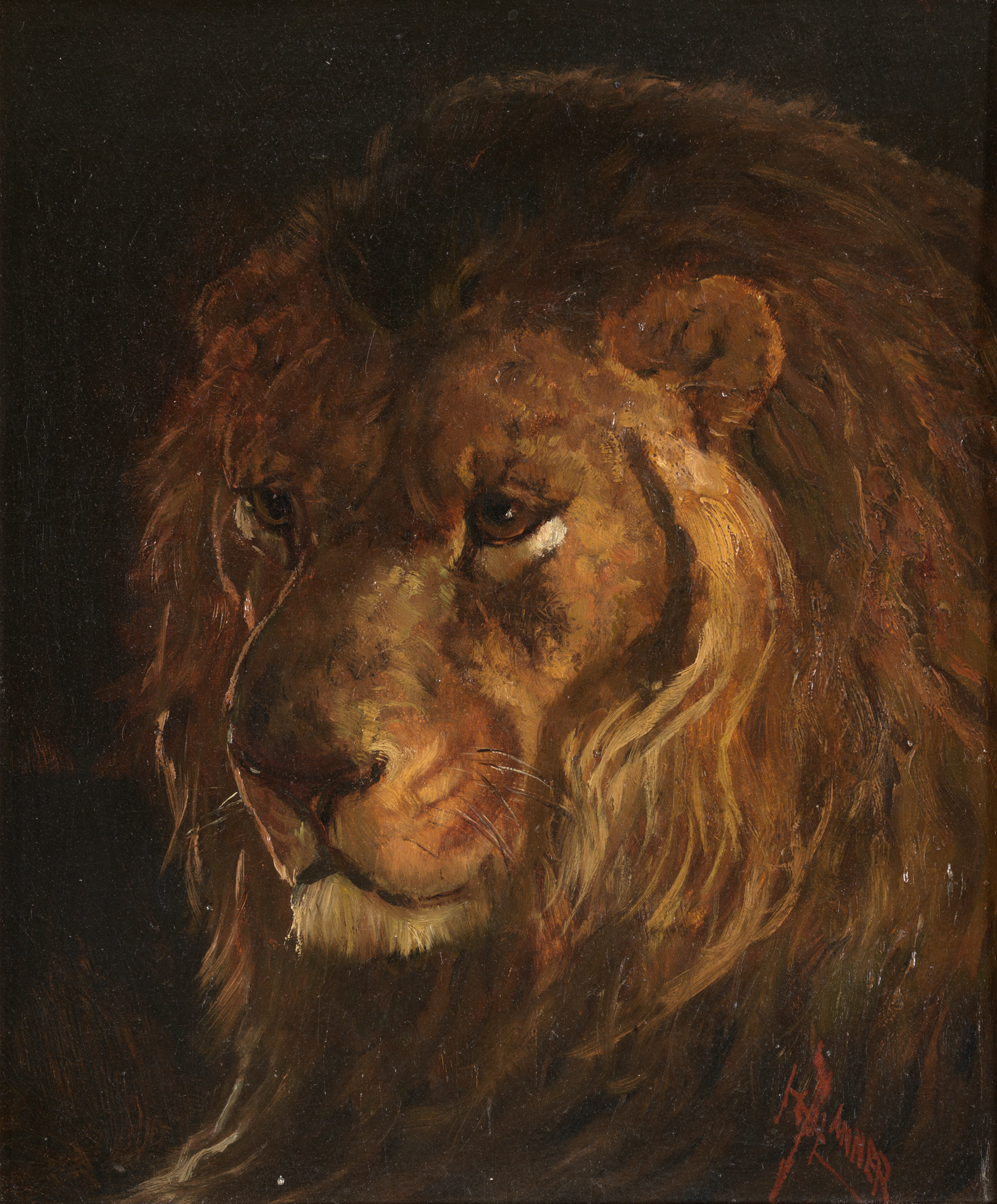
Pomp at the Philadelphia Zoo, circa 1880-1886

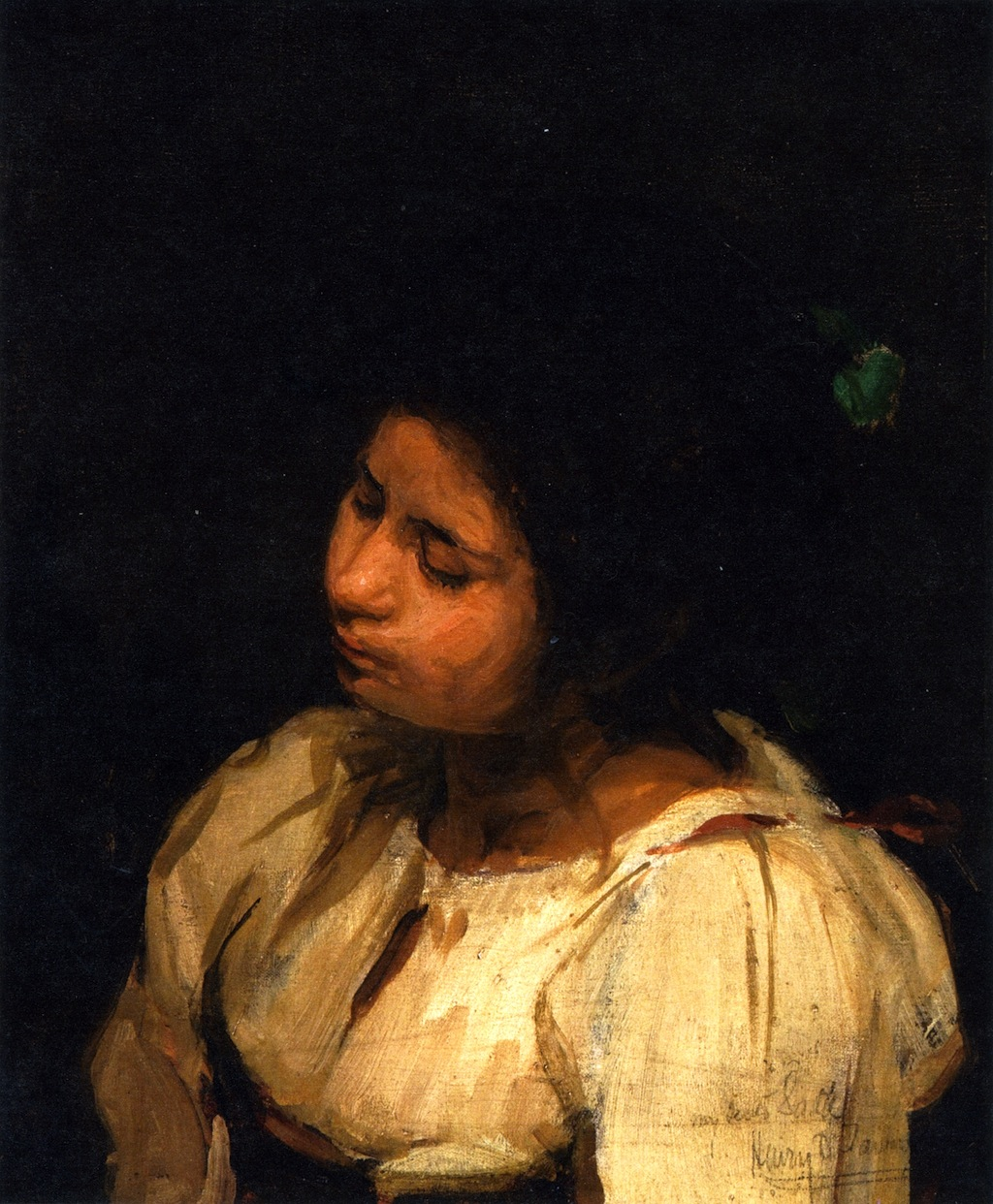
Sister Sarah, 1882.

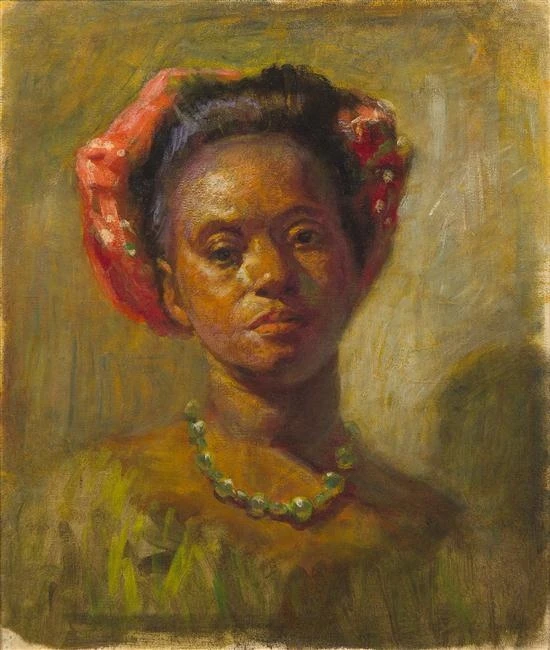
Woman from the West Indies, 1891, Brittany, France.

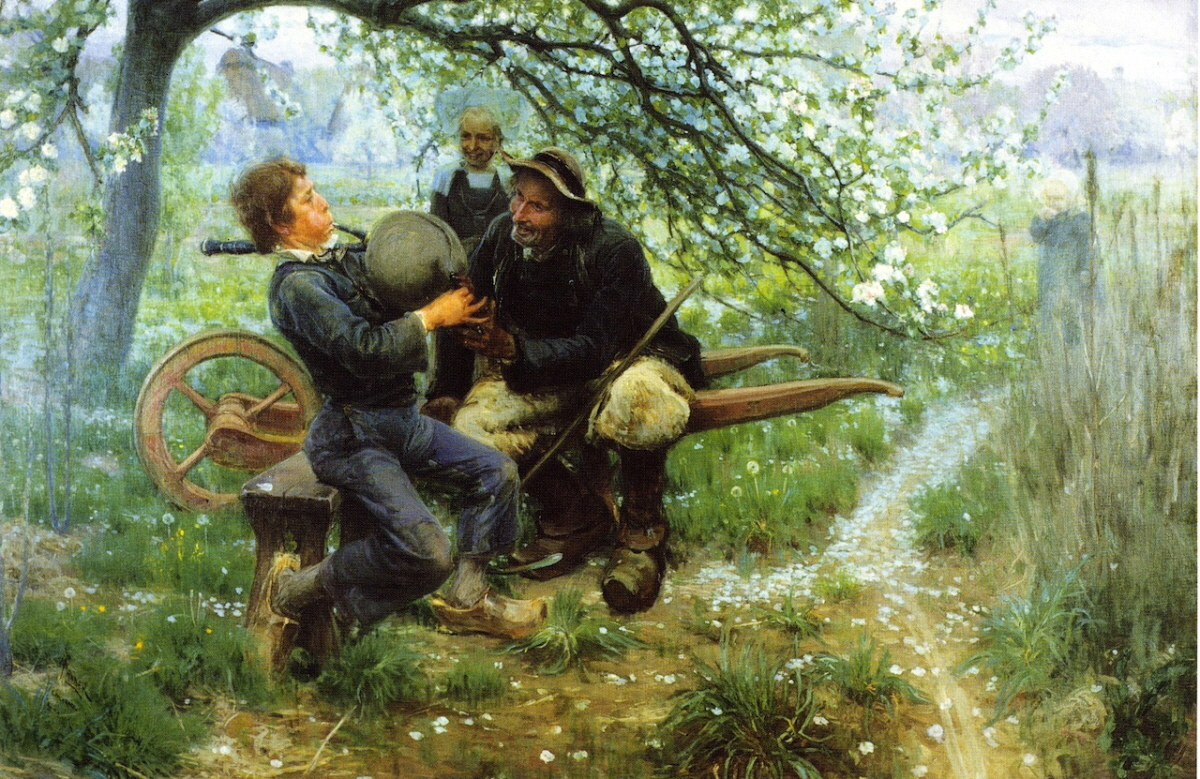
The Bagpipe Lesson, 1893

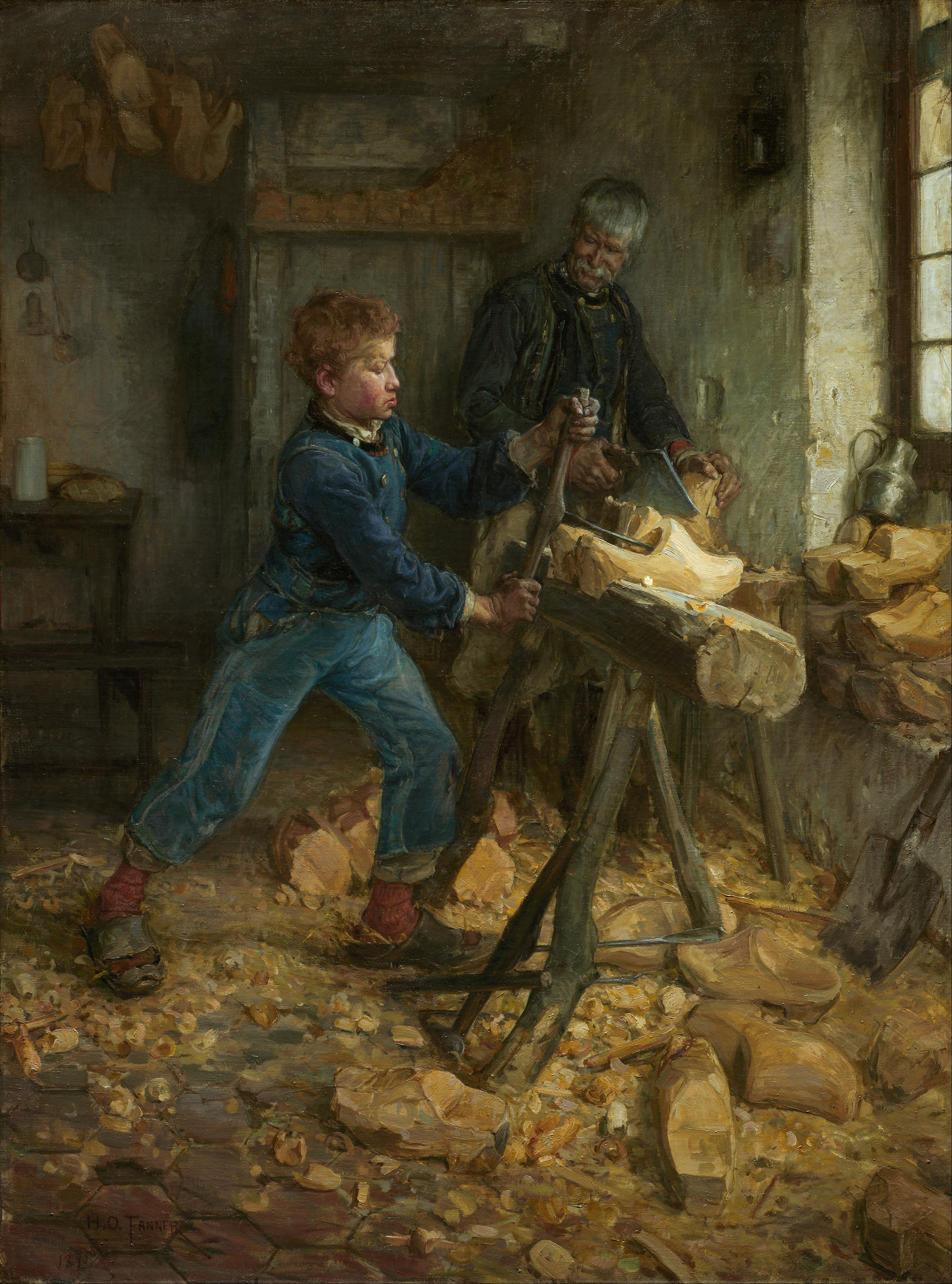
The Young Sabot Maker, 1895

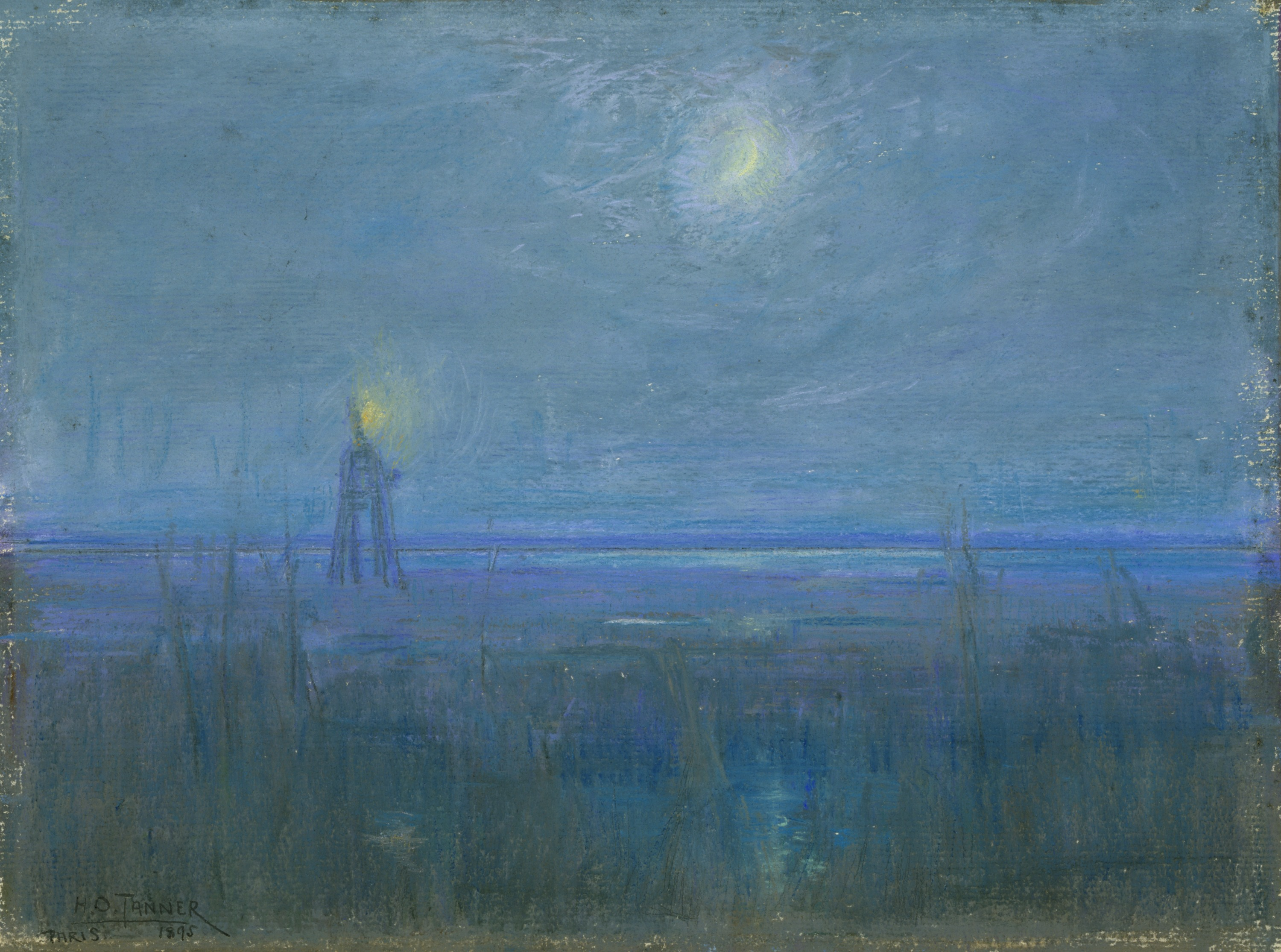
1895. Marshes in New Jersey; possibly the "pastel of New Jersey coast by moonlight" exhibited at the 1895 Salon with The Young Sabot Maker.

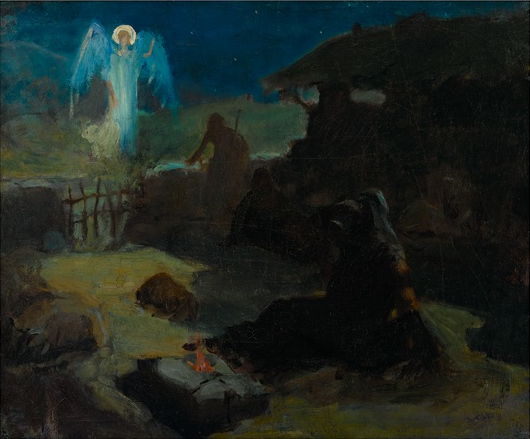
The Annunciation to the Shepherds, c. 1895

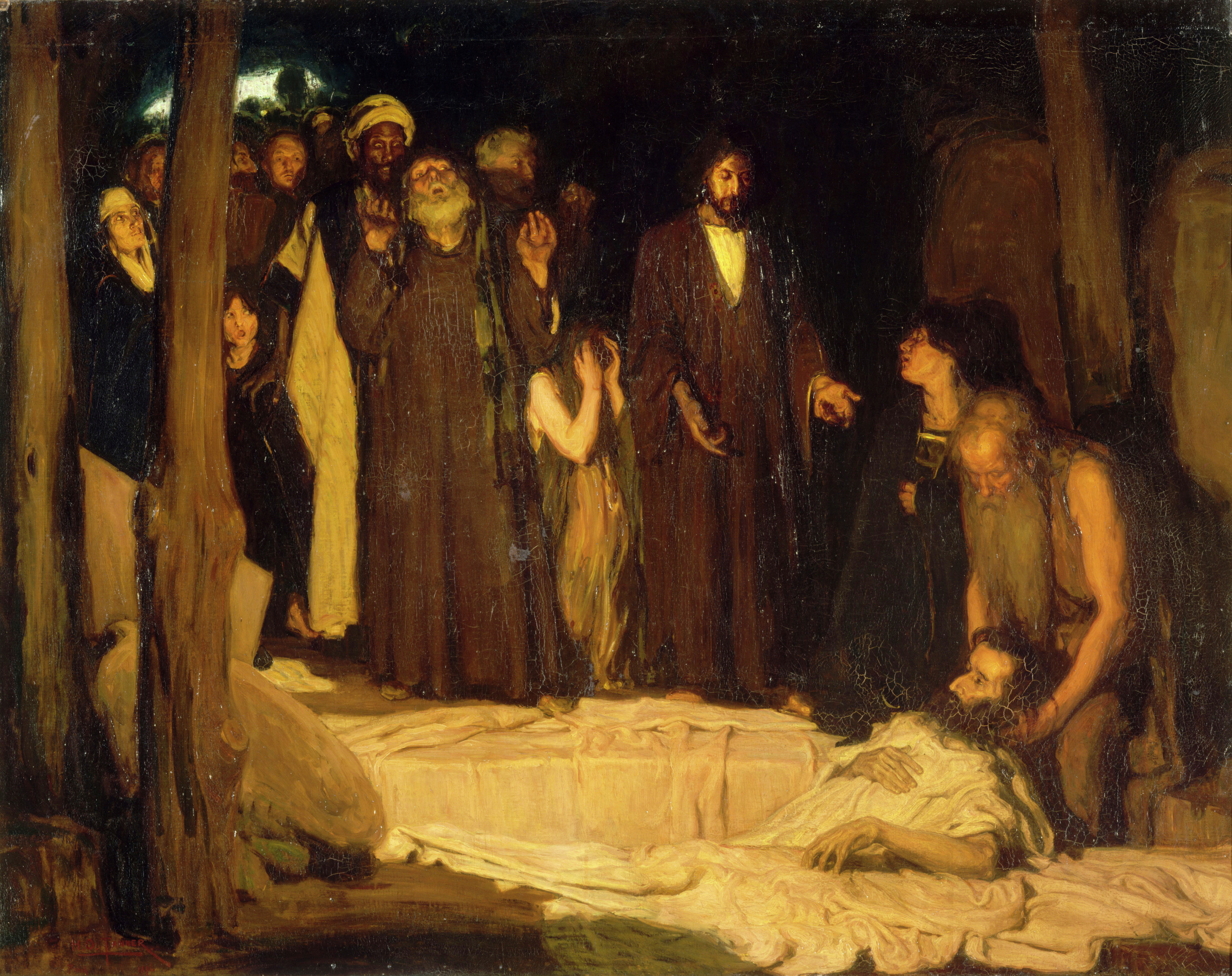
The Resurrection of Lazarus, 1896. Won medal in 1897 Paris Salon, bought by French government.

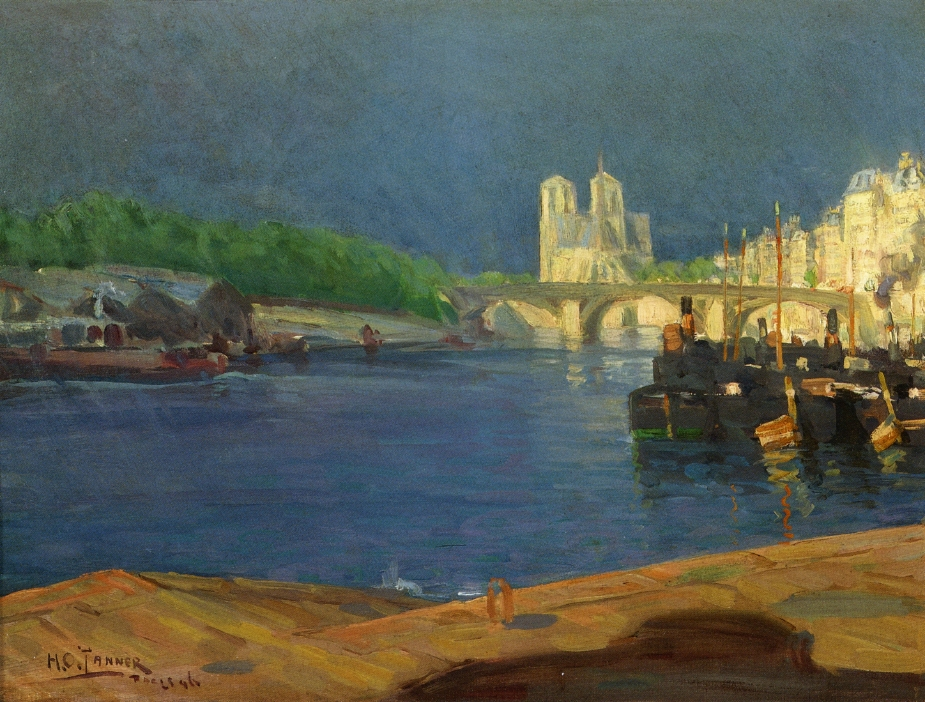
View of the Seine, looking toward Notre Dame, 1896

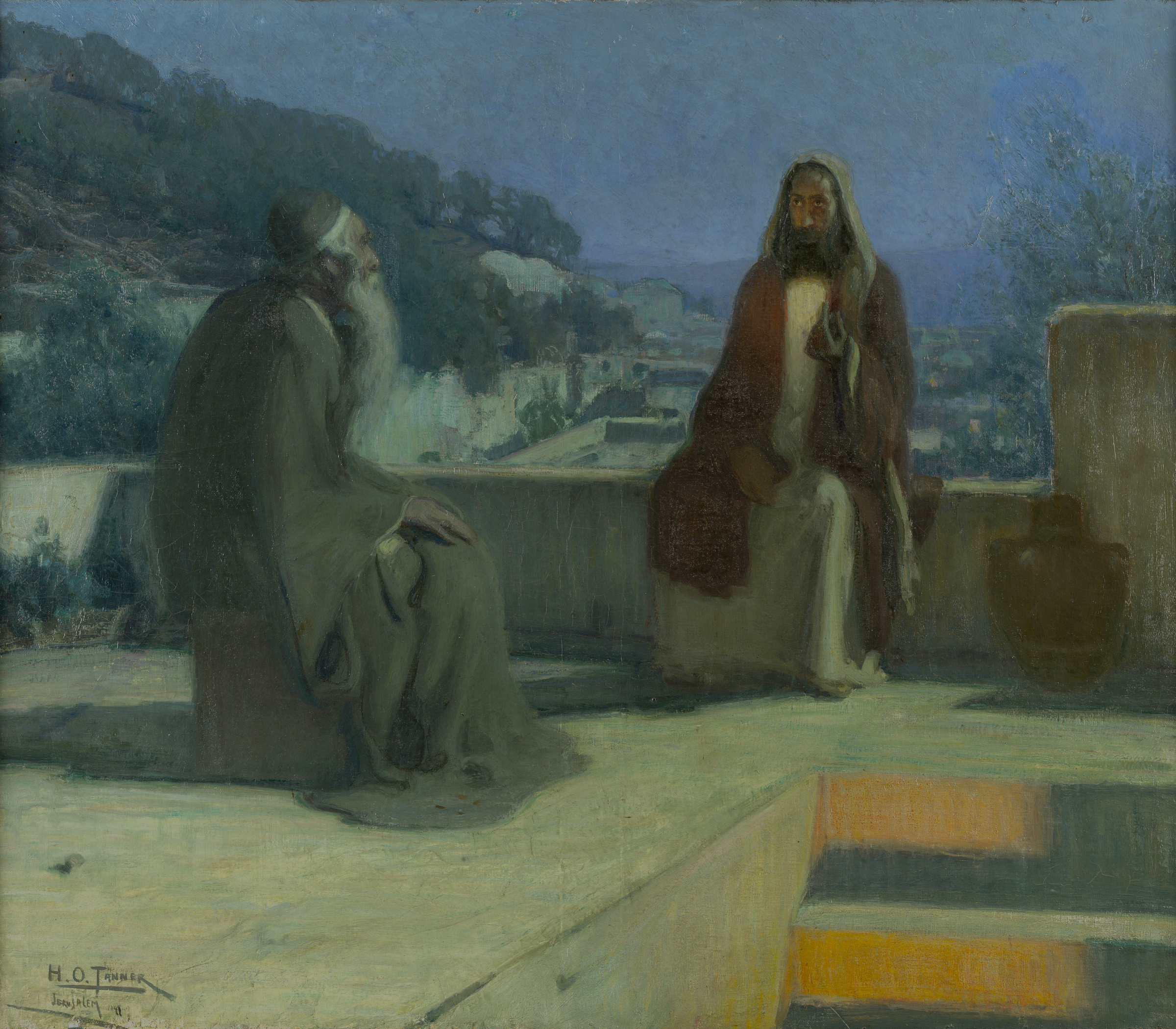
Jesus and Nicodemus, 1899. Displayed at Paris Salon and Pennsylvania Academy of Fine Arts, where it won a Walter Lippincott Prize.

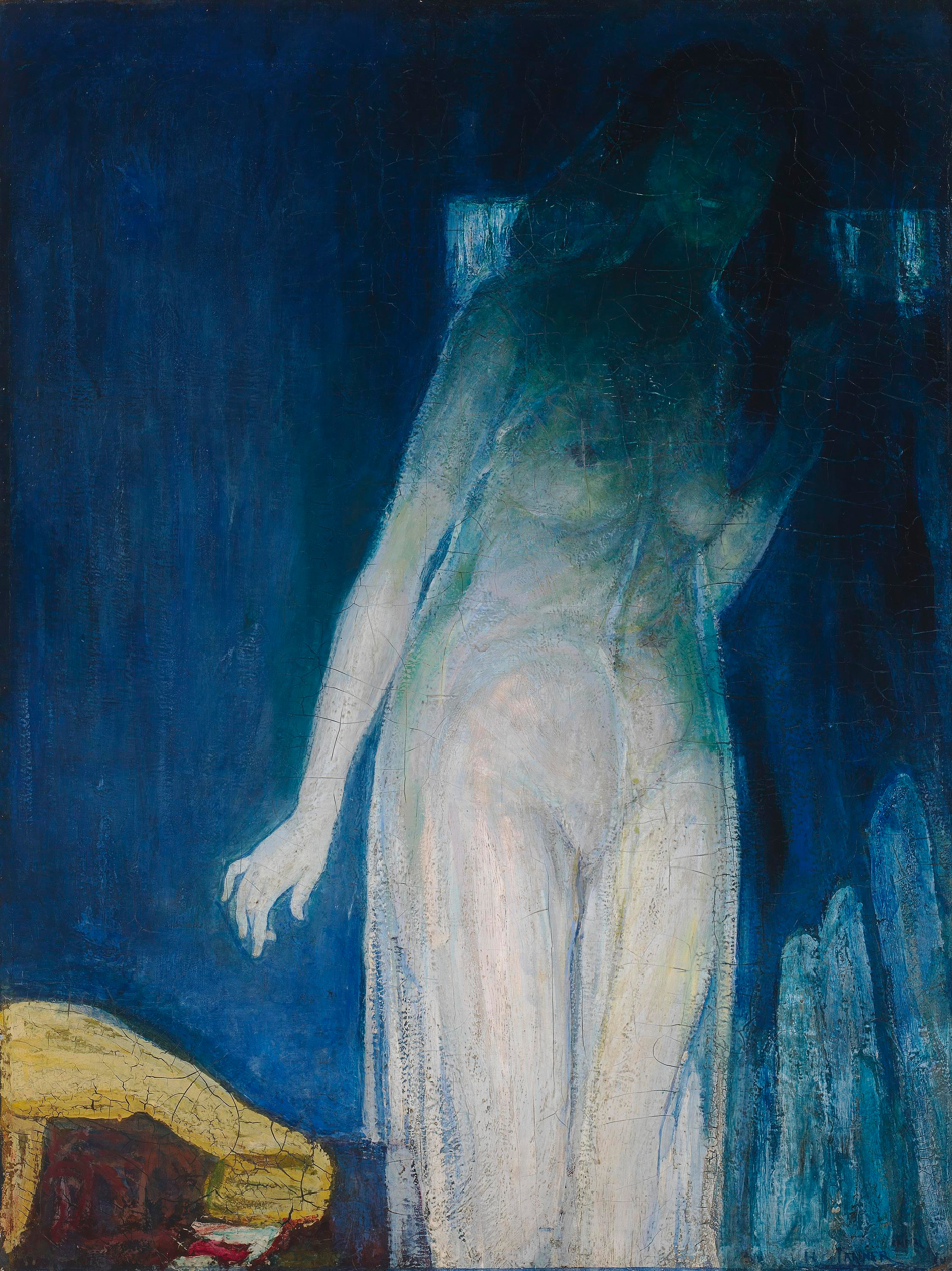
Salome, circa 1900. The body of John the Baptist lies at her feet.

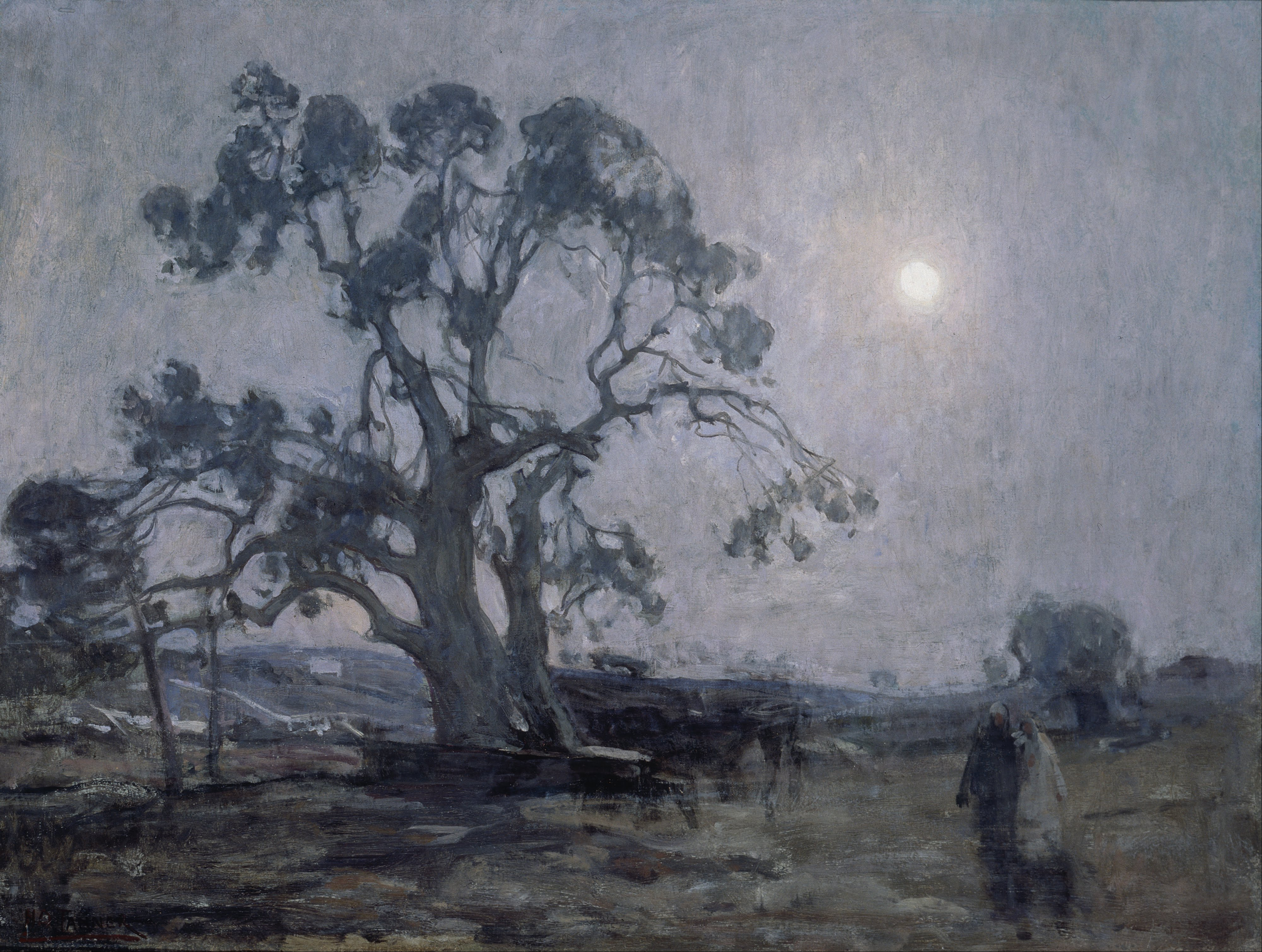
Abraham's Oak, 1905. Biblical subject, also called the Oak of Mamre.

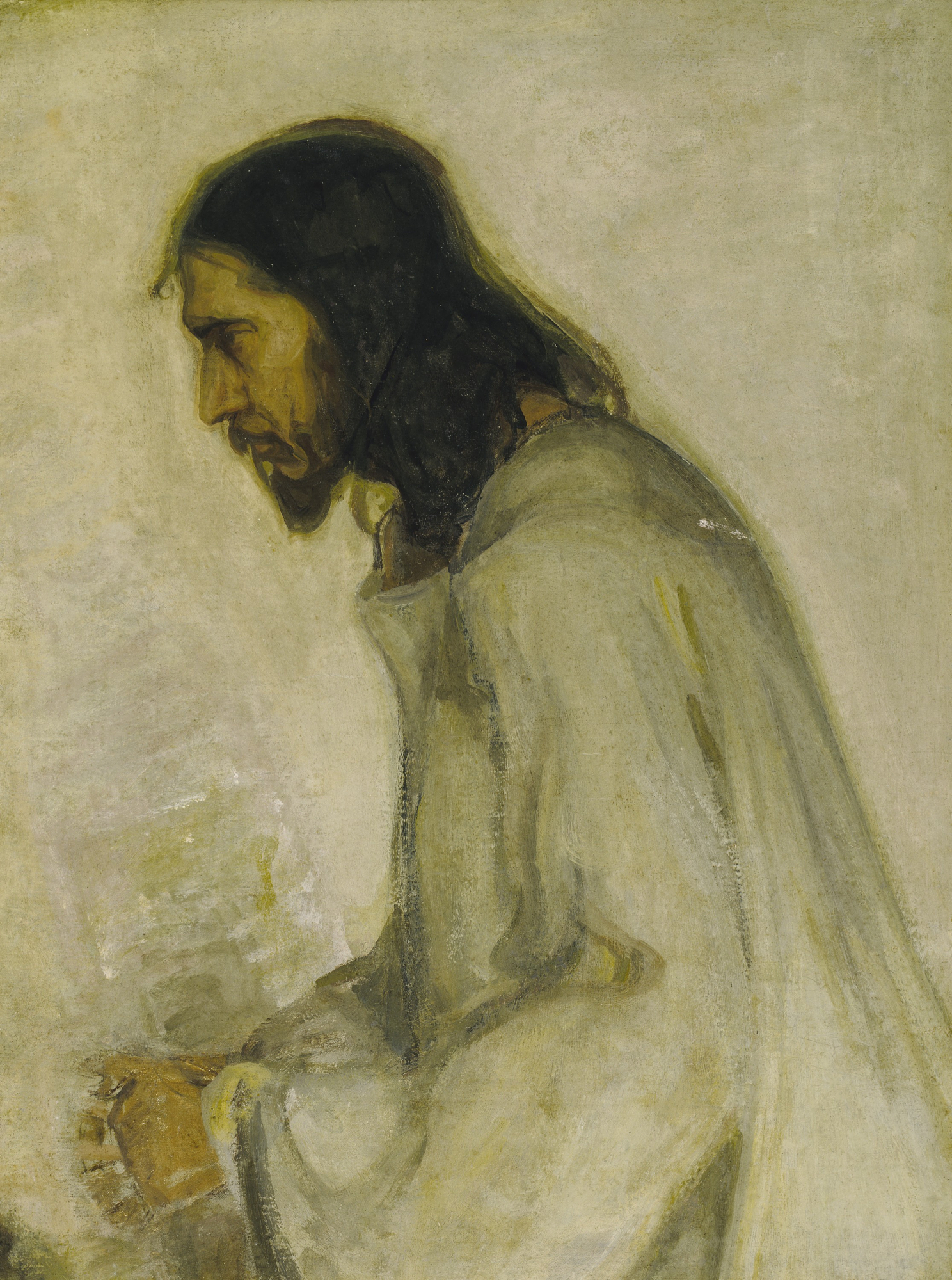
The Savior, 1900–1905

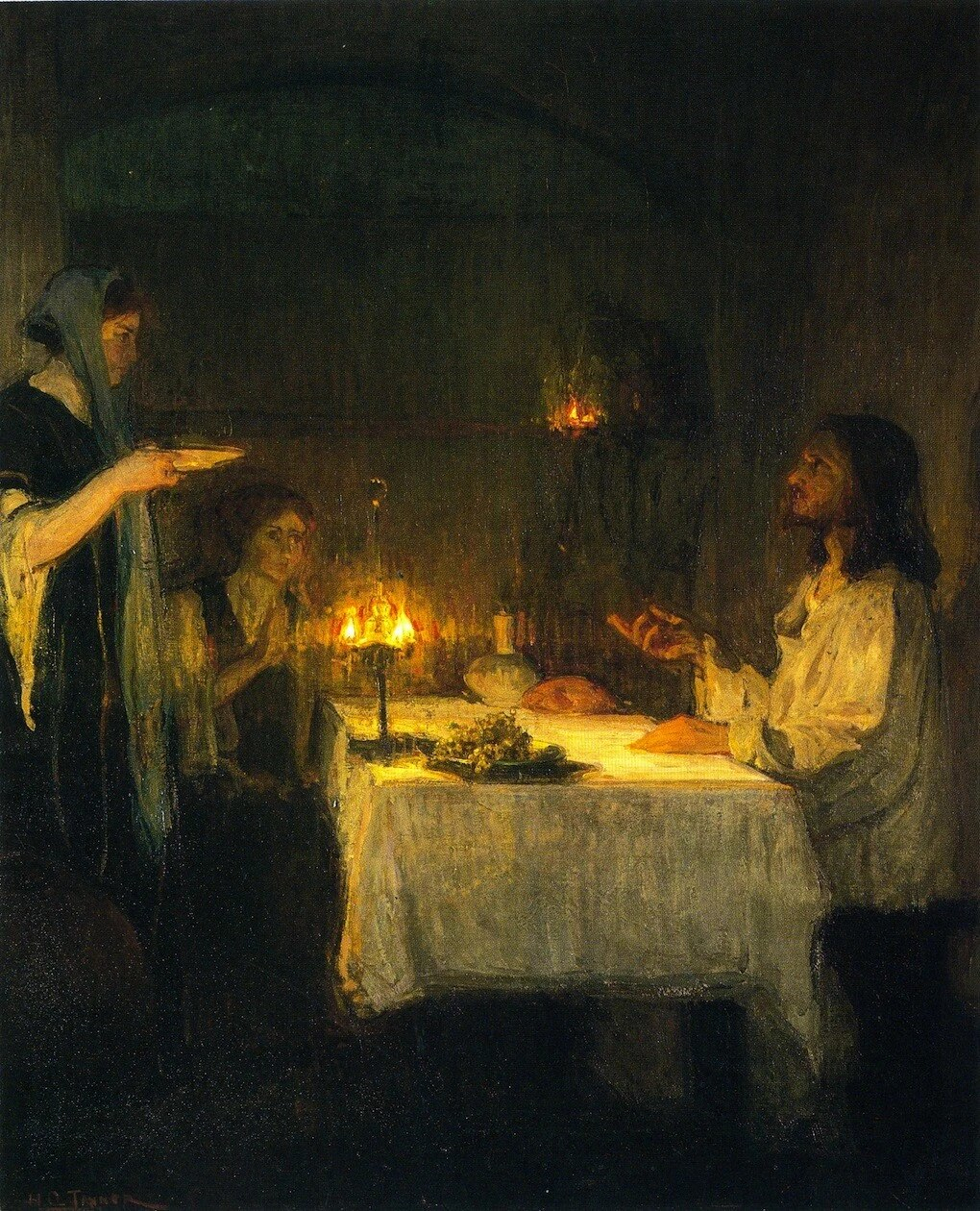
Christ in the home of Mary and Martha, 1905

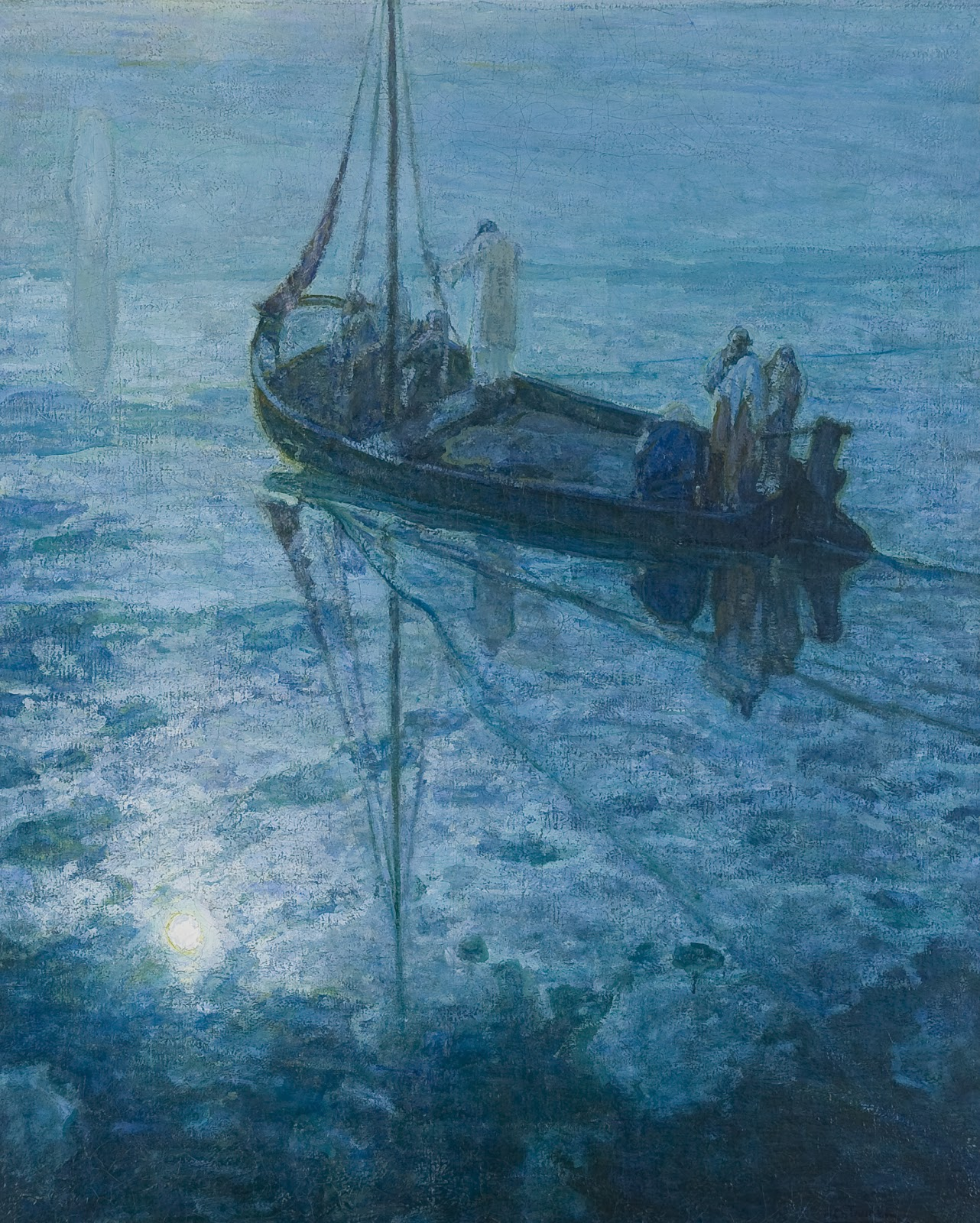
The Disciples See Christ Walking on the Water, c. 1907

Angels Appearing before the Shepherds, c. 1910

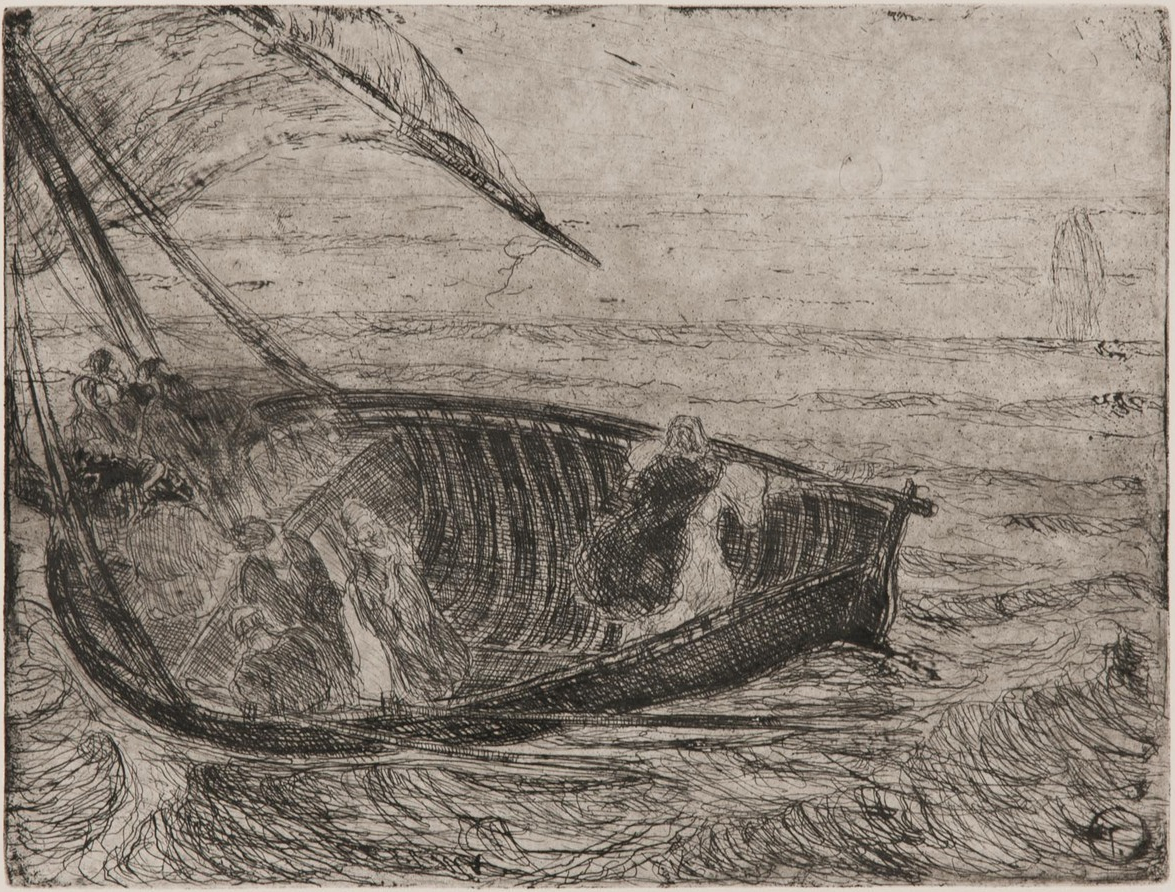
Christ walking on the water. Engraving, possibly a show catalog, 1910.

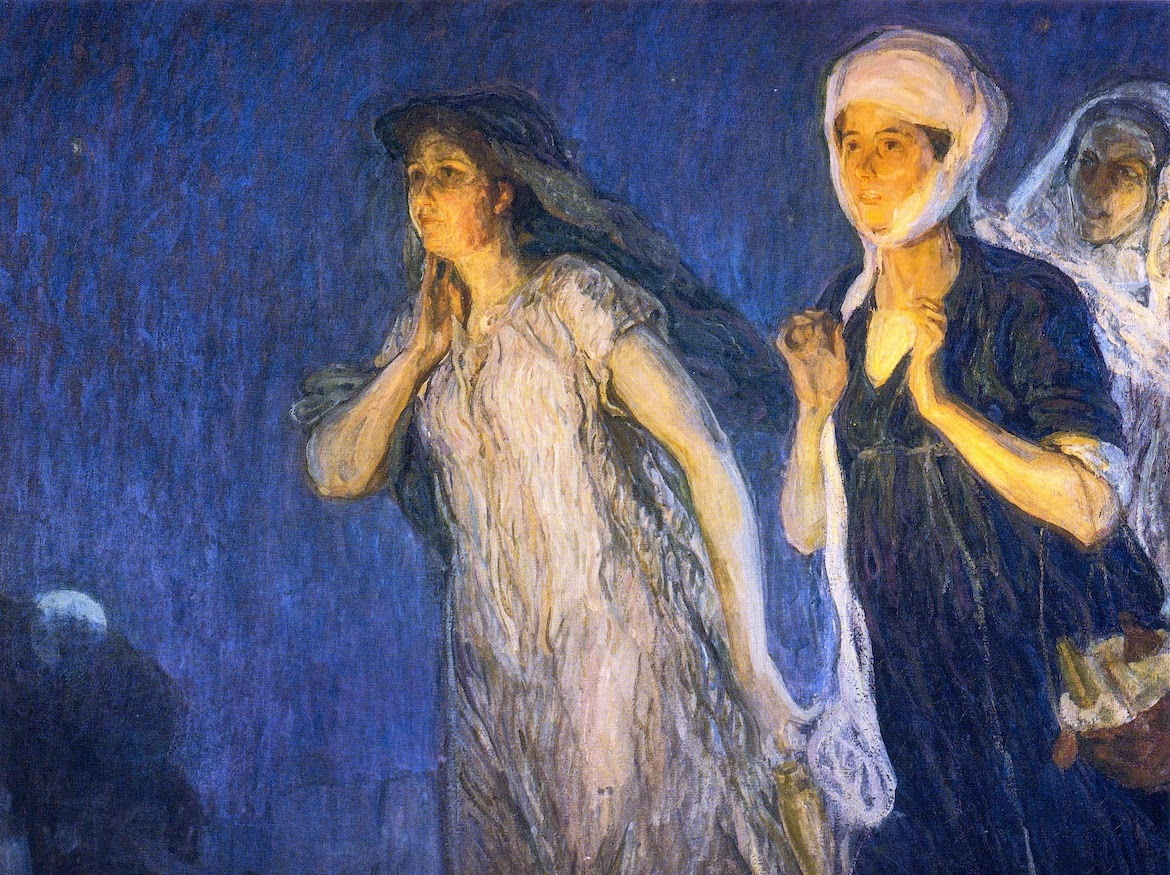
The Three Marys (at Jesus' tomb), 1910. Entered in the 1910 Salon. (From left) Mary Magdalene, Mary, mother of Jesus, Mary Salome

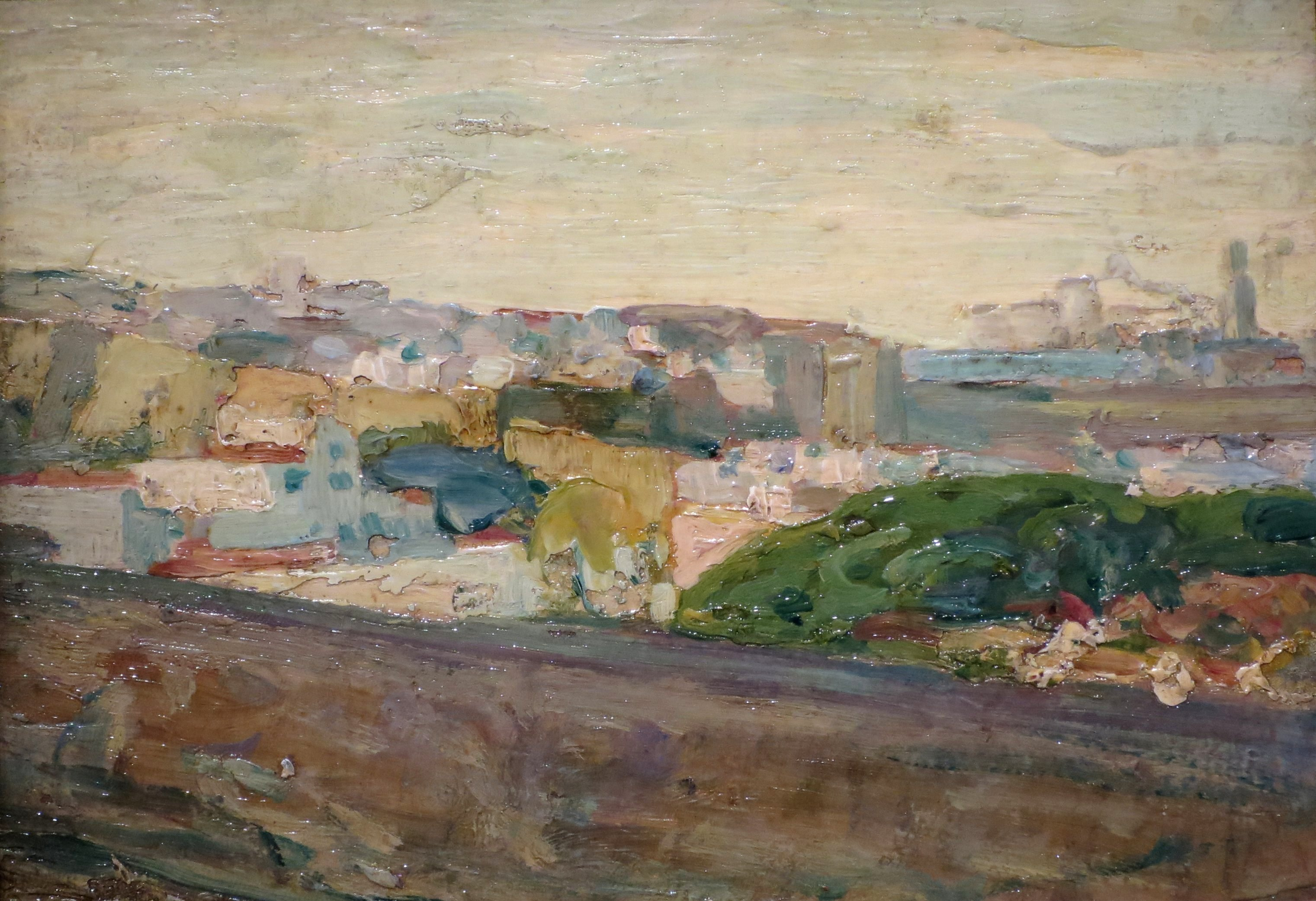
A View of Fez, c. 1912

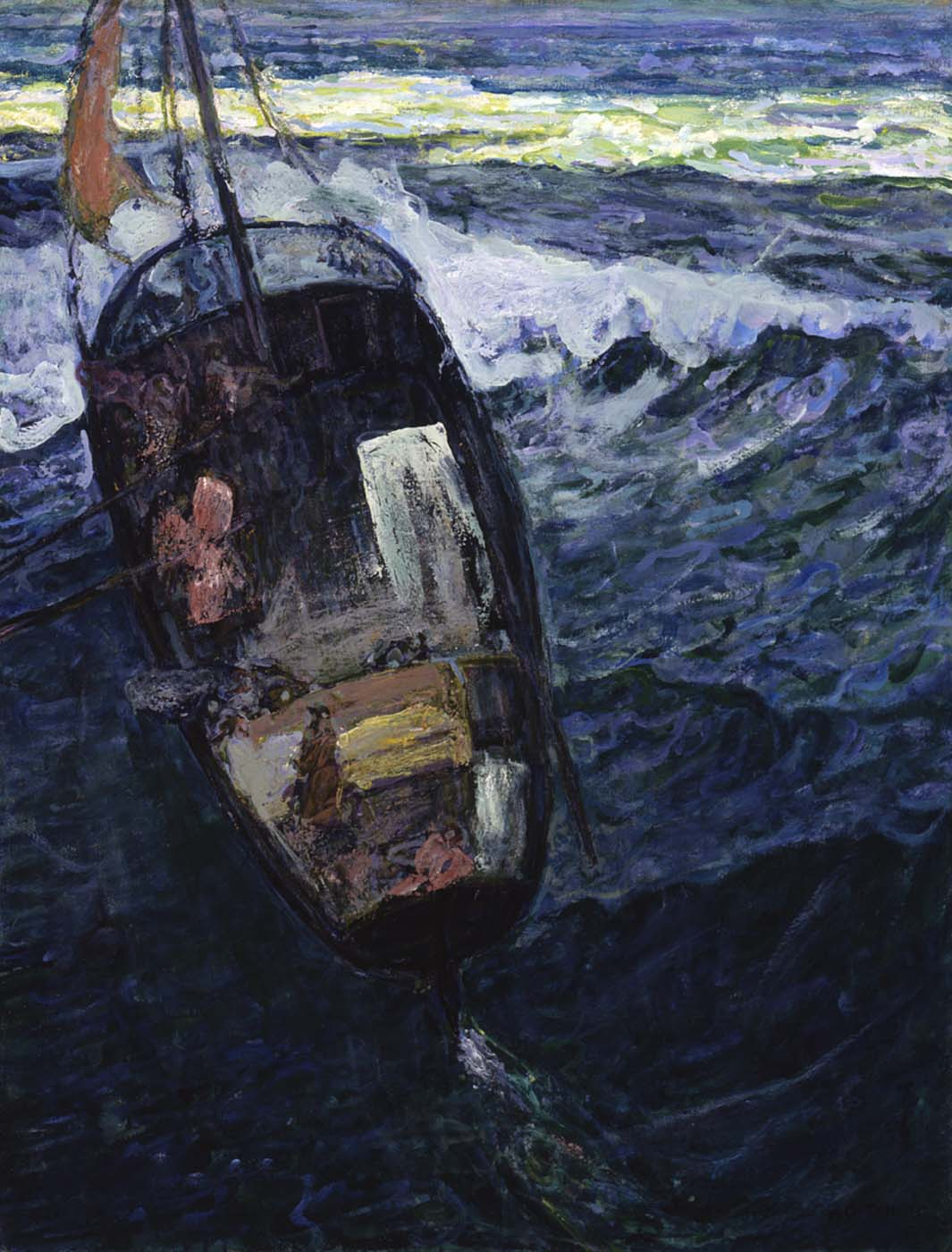
Fishermen at Sea, c. 1913

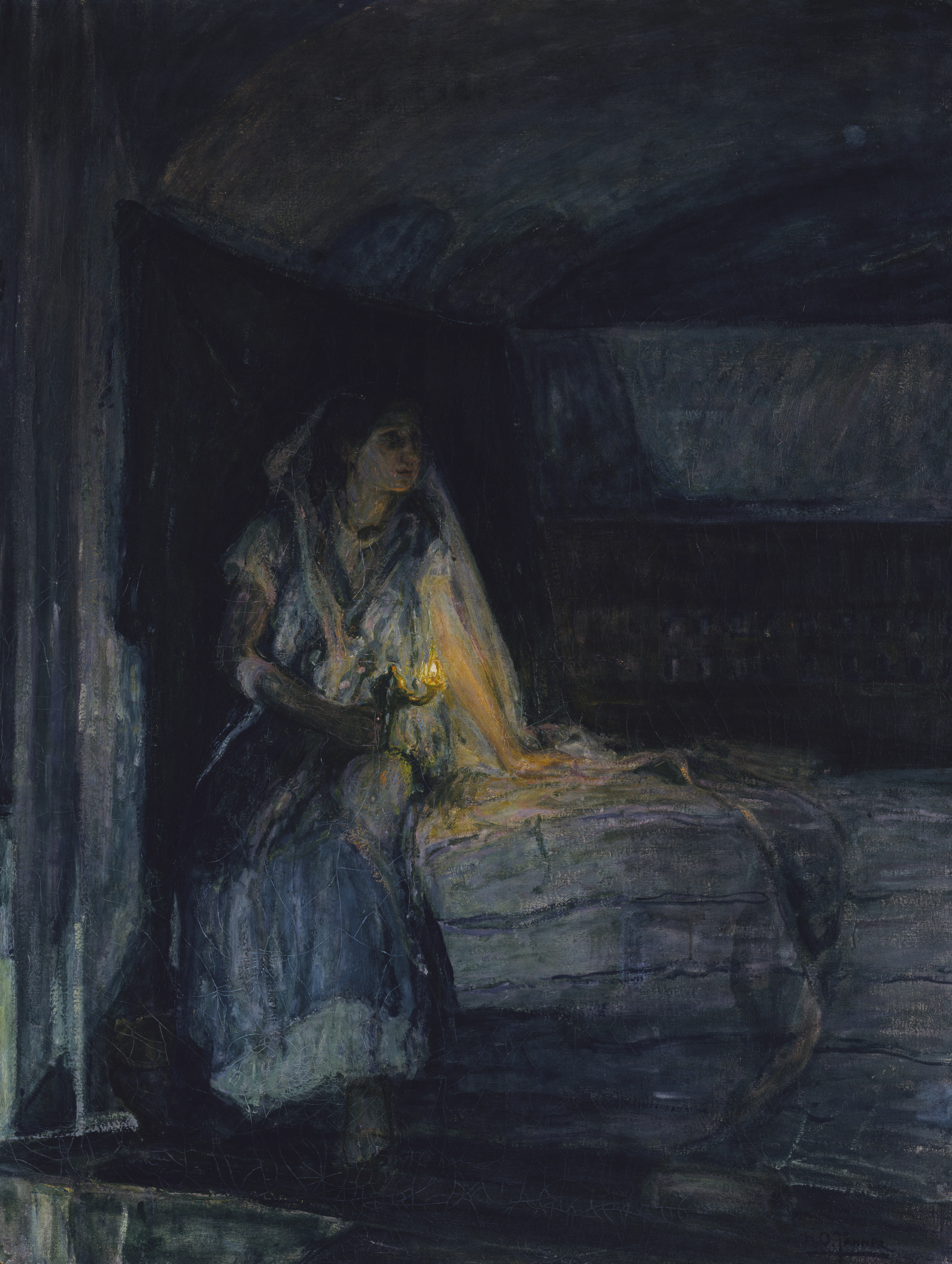
Mary, 1914

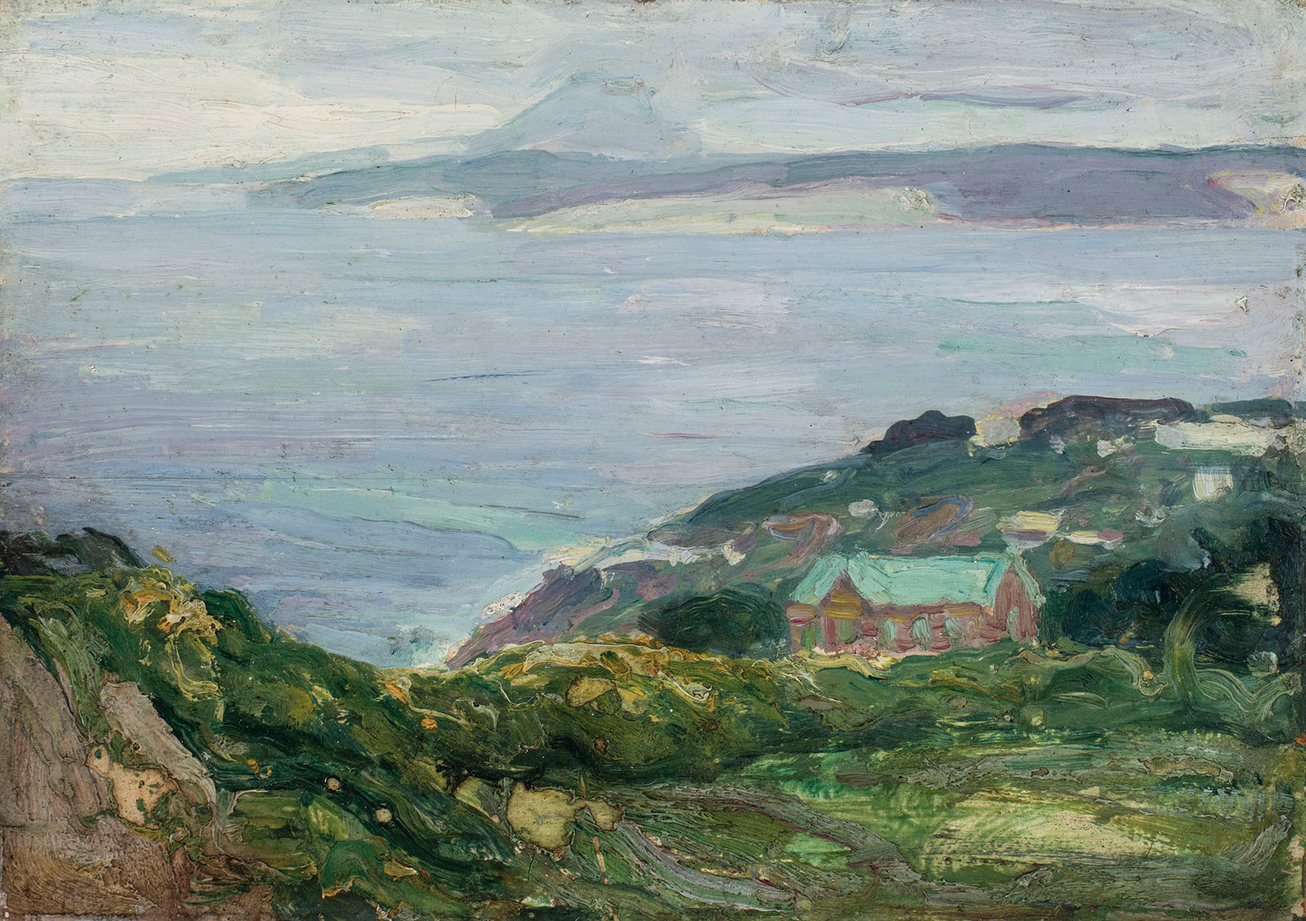
Coastal Landscape, France, 1919

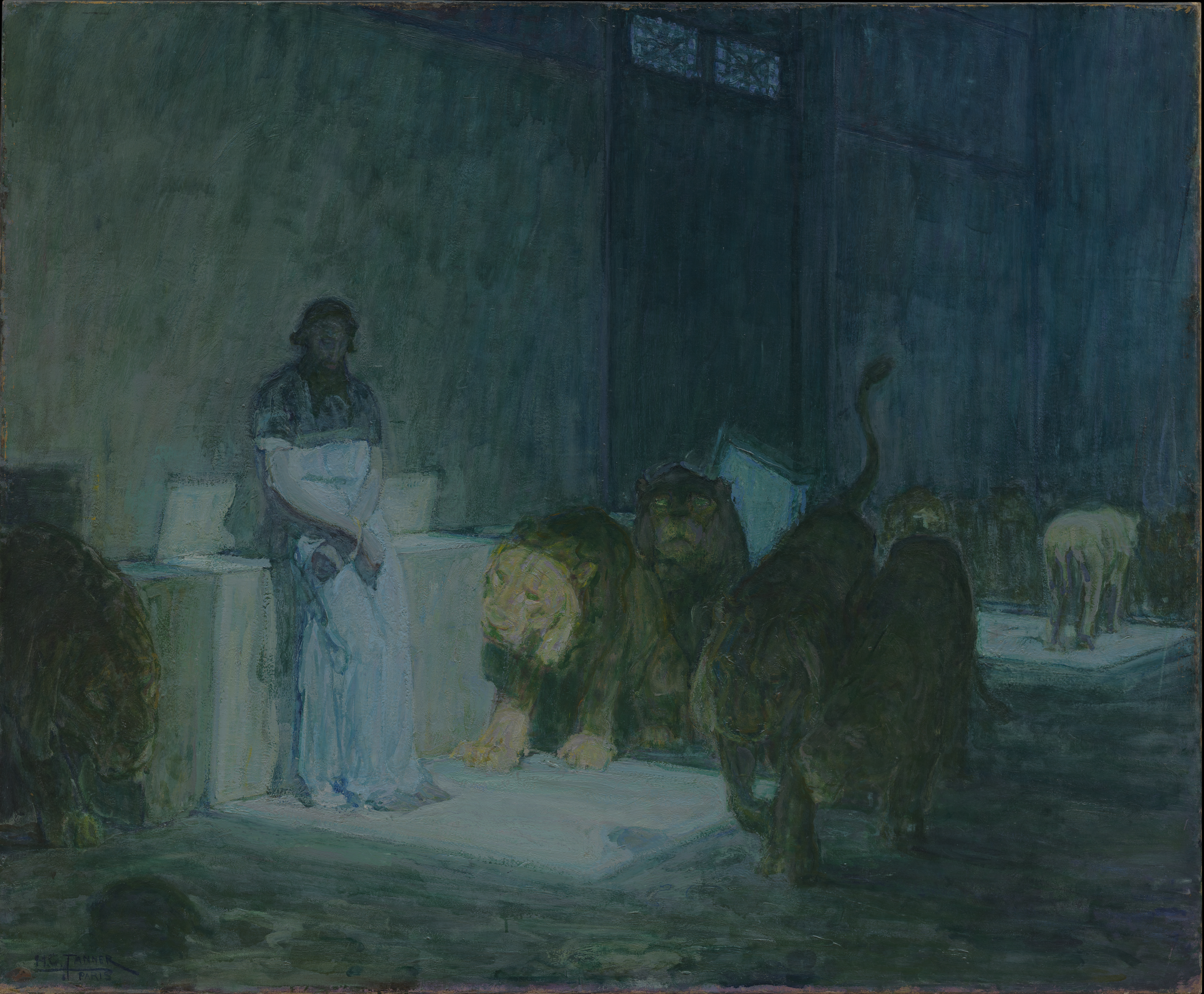
Daniel in the Lions' Den, 1907–1918. The original (now lost) was painted in 1895 and displayed in the 1896 Salon.

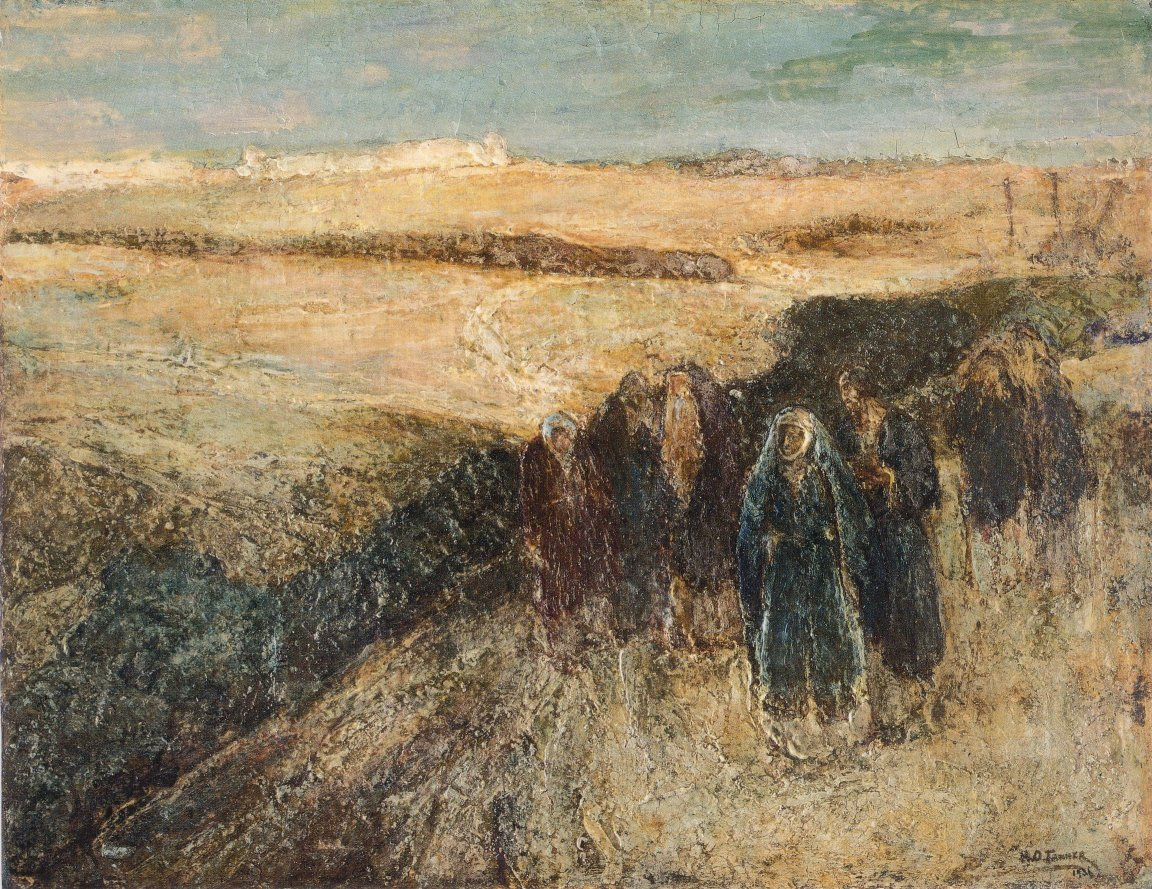
1936. Tanner's final painting, Return from the Crucifixion. Mary and Joseph are in the front.
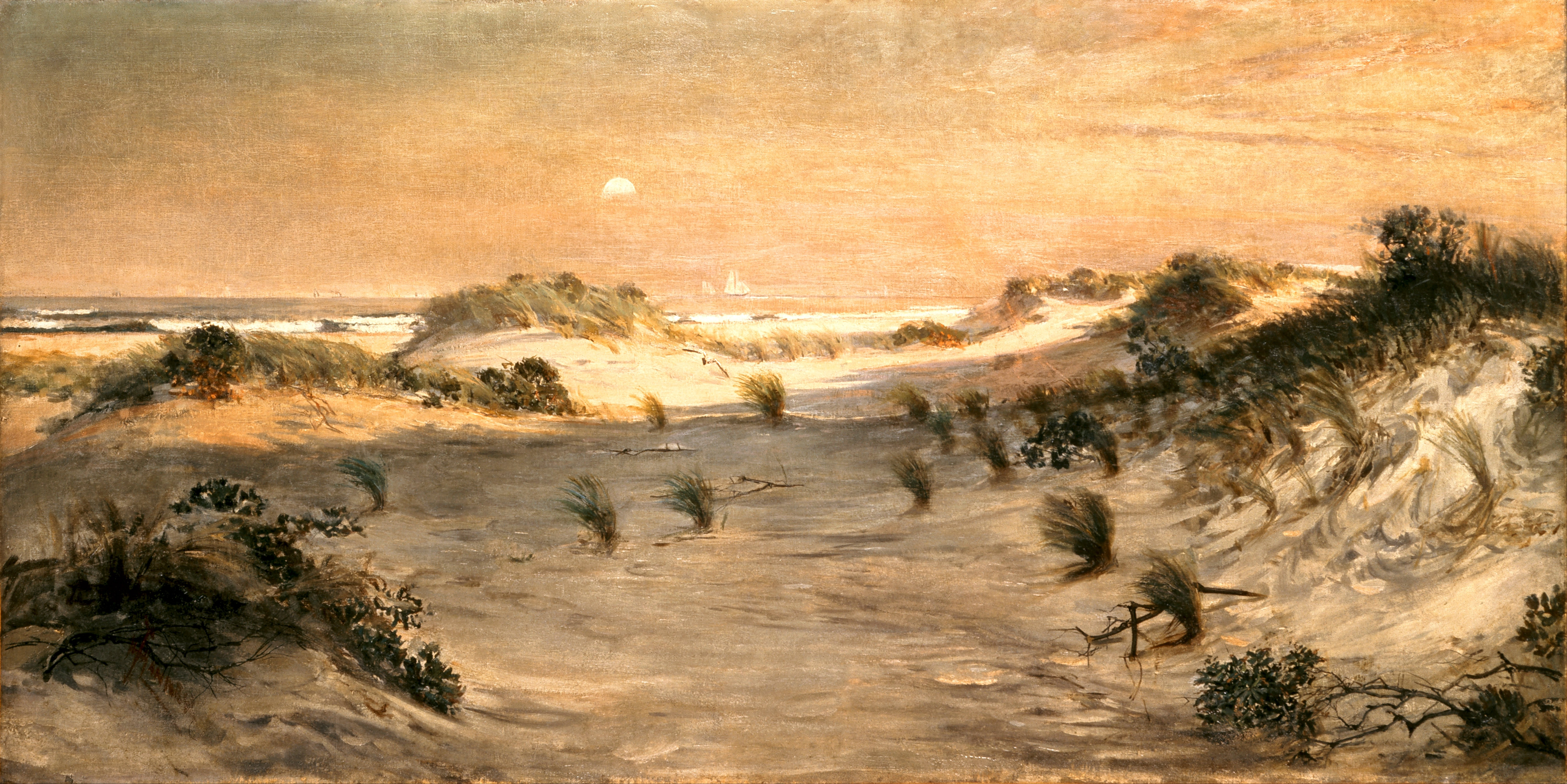
Sand Dunes at Sunset, Atlantic City, c. 1885, the White House.

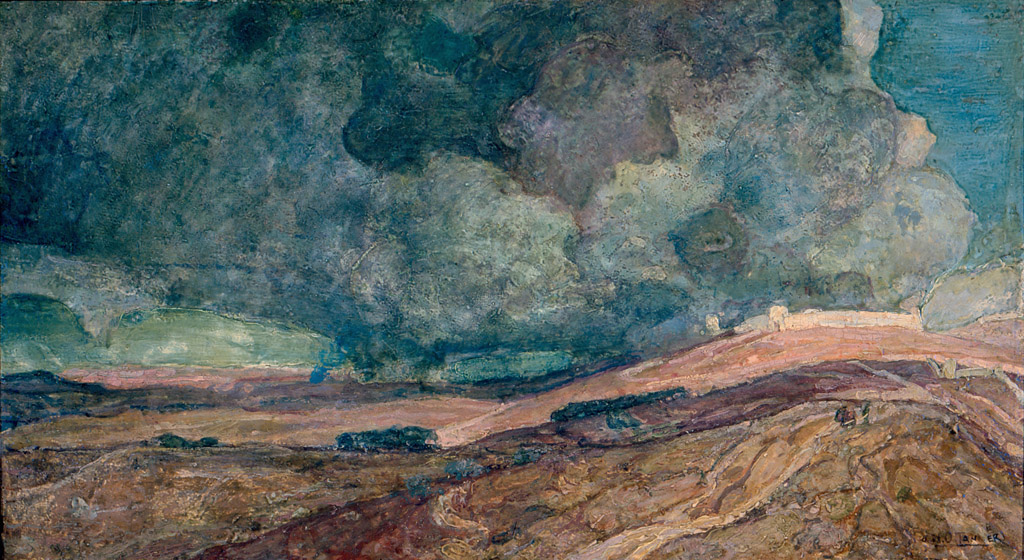
Destruction of Sodom and Gomorrah, 1929–30, High Museum of Art

== See also ==
- African-American art
- List of Orientalist artists
- Orientalism
- Realism (arts)
