= Lions in the Desert =

Painting by Henry Ossawa Tanner

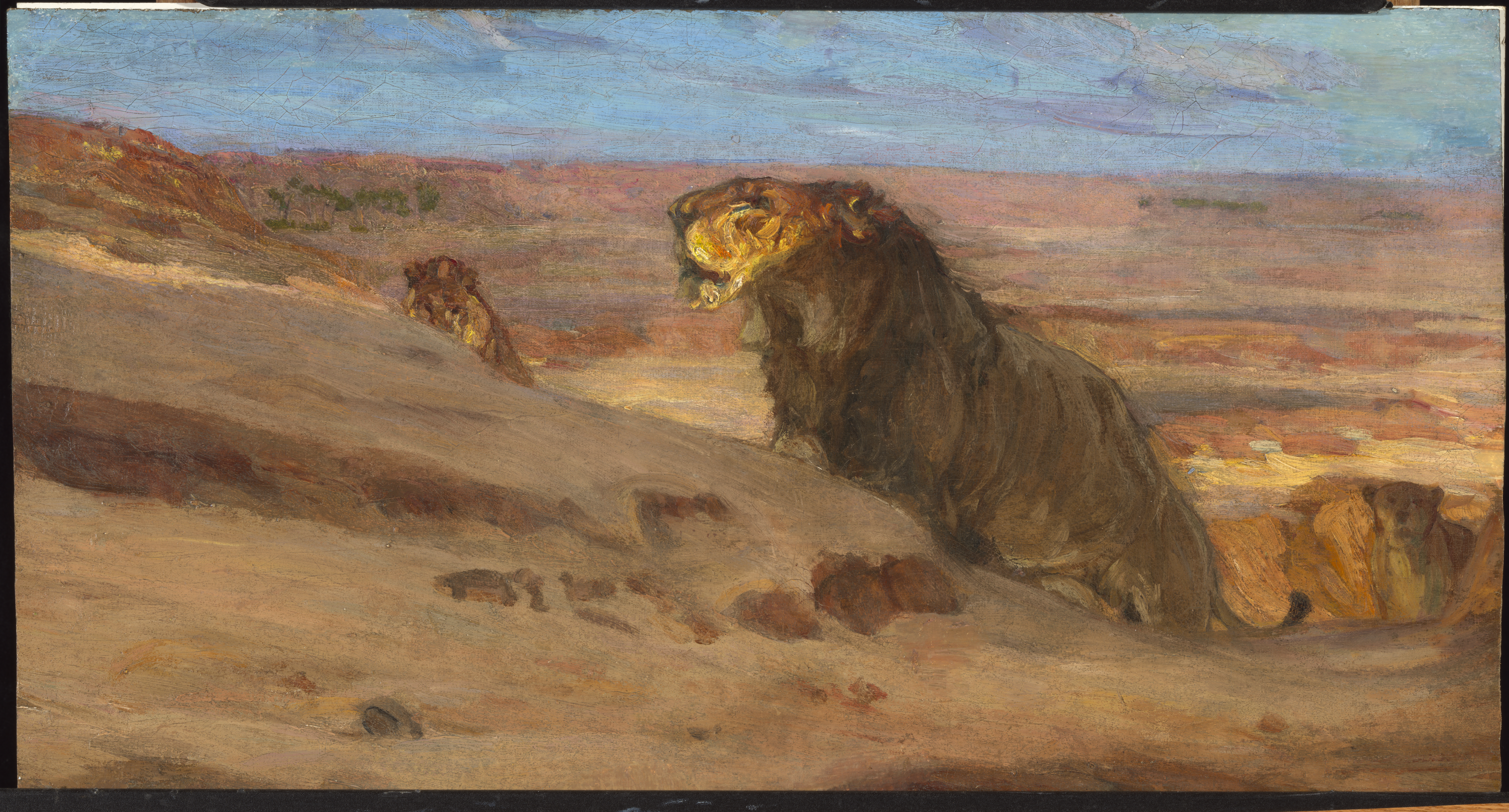
Lions in the Desert

Lions in the Desert is a painting by Henry Ossawa Tanner, painted in 1897–98 during a visit to the Middle East.

== See also ==
- List of paintings by Henry Ossawa Tanner
