= List of paintings by Henry Ossawa Tanner =

This is an incomplete list of paintings by American painter Henry Ossawa Tanner (June 21, 1859 – May 25, 1937). Tanner is the first Black artist to have a major solo exhibition in the United States, and the first to have his work acquired for the collection of the White House.

== Works ==
Date Tanner's approximate age	Events of Tanner's life	Description	Artwork name	Details	Picture	
1870 11 years old	Drawing was part of Tanner's childhood in elementary school. However, he did not consider himself gifted.		Barnyard Fowl	Attributed to Tanner online. In doubt, considering Tanner decided to paint in 1872.		
1875-1876 16–17 years old	In 1872 he saw a painter painting a landscape in a park and was inspired to paint. Tanner saw paintings at Earle's Galleries in Philadelphia. He spent summers in Atlantic City.	In 1872 (age 13) he decides to become a marine painter. "Tanner's first known painting" was Harbor Scene. This painting completed with no art education.	Harbor Scene	Private collection. Oil on canvas board glued to Masonite. 14 x 20" (35.56 x 50.8 cm)		
undated	Tanner sketches a shipwreck, impresses artist Henry Price, who takes him in to teach him for about a year.	This impressionist painting is not that sketch but came later.	The Wreck	Smithsonian American Art Museum, 1983.95.205. Oil on panel, 9 1/4 x 12 1/8 in. (23.5 x 30.8 cm.)		
circa 1876-1879 about 17–20 years old	Attending Philadelphia Academy, beginning 1879, and through 1885 (not continuously but periodically)		Seascape	Impressionism, family collection of Rae Alexander-Mintner		
1876-1879 17–20 years old			Seascape Jetty	Private collection. Oil on canvas. 12 x 17" (30.48 x 43.18 cm)		
1879 20 years old	Tanner exposed to paintings at Earle's Galleries in Philadelphia. Spends summers in Atlantic City.	An early painting, done while learning, "probably derived from another artist's work".	Ship in a Storm	Private collection. Oil on academy board 10'/16 x 6"(25.56 x 15.24 cm)		
1879 20 years old		Painting likely made before he entered the Pennsylvania Academy of Fine Arts.	Fauna	Hampton University Museum. Oil on canvas. 38 3/8″ x 29 3/4″		
c. 1880 21 years old			After the Storm	Formerly in the Evans-Tibbs Collection.		
1880 21 years old			untitled	Telfair Museums, 1998.29. Oil on canvas, 15 1/8 × 25 3/16 inches (38.4 × 64 cm)	Untitled landscape, circa 1880, Henry Ossawa Tanner	
c. 1880 21 years old		Student work made while Tanner was attending the Philadelphia Academy. The second photo is of the same lion, done at a later date.	Pomp at the zoo	Private collection. Oil on canvas, 20 x 16 in.		Pomp at the Philadelphia Zoo, circa 1880-1886
c. 1880-1881 21–22 years old	In a biographical article, Tanner wrote of his experience of owning and painting a sheep while at the Pennsylvania Academy of Fine Arts.	Study of a sheep's head. Tanner switched his interest from marine painting to painting animals.	Head of a Sheep	Private collection. Oil on canvas, on board, 10 1/2x10 in. (267x254 mm)		
1881 22 years old	In the 1880-1881 period, Tanner lived in Philadelphia with his parents, as he tried to start life as a painter.		Boy and Sheep Under a Tree	Private collection. Oil on canvas, 17 3/8 x 27 in.		
undated			Feeding Sheep		Feeding Sheep, by Henry Ossawa Tanner	
1881-1882 22–23 years old		Portrait of a girl; "My Sister Sara" is written on lower right. Tanner had a sister Sarah Elizabeth Tanner who was 9 years old in 1882.	Sister Sara Done while Tanner was at the Philadelphia Academy.	Private collection. Oil on canvas, 16 x 13 in.		
c. 1882 23 years old	Tanner can be identified by his signature in these works.	Historical painting for magazine, not used. Three other paintings illustrated the article, called The Witch Hunt, by Louise Stockton, in Our Continent magazine, August 30, 1882, pages 233–235.	The Witch Hunt			Man with a ruffed collar, dated "Paris, '95". Private collection. Oil on canvas, 43.8 x 35.6 cm. (17.2 x 14 in.)
1882 23 years old	Tanner can be identified by his signature in these works.	Historical painting for magazine, illustrating the article, called The Witch Hunt, by Louise Stockton, in Our Continent magazine, August 30, 1882, pages 233–235.	Waiting for the Lord	Historical Society of Pennsylvania. Gouache on board, 13'/2 X 12”.	Waiting for the Lord (magazine print)	
c. 1882 23 years old	Tanner can be identified by his signature in these works.	Historical painting for magazine, illustrating the article, called The Witch Hunt, by Louise Stockton, in Our Continent magazine, August 30, 1882, pages 233–235.	Gathering Faggots and At the Well		Gathering Faggots	At the Well
1884		Painting of elk attacked by wolves; has been pointed out as symbolizing racist attacks on him while studying at the Philadelphia Academy of Art.	Battle of Life	Lost		
c. 1885 26 years old		Shepherdess herding sheep	untitled	Private collection. Oil on panel, 13 x 9 1/2 in.		
c. 1885 26 years old		Landscape done near the end of his time studying at the Philadelphia Academy. Installed at the Green Room, White House.	Sand Dunes at Sunset, Atlantic City or Back from the Beach	White House Historical Association, 995.1759.1. Oil on canvas, 30 3/16 x 59 7/16 in.		
1885-1886 26–27 years old	Tanner spent time studying the nude form at the Pennsylvania Academy of Fine Art.	Painting was a study for a planned painting of a mythological scene of Androcles with a lion.	Study for Androcles	Private collection. Oil on canvas, 31' x 18"		
1886 27 years old		Tanner had been painting lions since at least 1880. He abandoned his project for Androcles and the lion as beyond his current abilities, but continued painting lions in works such as this.	Lion Licking Its Paw or After Dinner	Allentown Art Museum, 1962.5. Oil on canvas, 30 x 36" (76.2 x 91.44 cm)		
1888 29 years old	Tanner grew up in Pennsylvania near the house of Nicolas Wynkoop, who built it in 1739. That house would later be owned by "abolitionist" Judge Henry Wynkoop, who freed his slaves. Some of Judge Henry Wynkoop's slaves chose to remain with his family after receiving freedom on his death; a tree became their cemetery marker.	Picture of a different Wynkoop house in Harlem, Manhattan, New York City dated with signature 1888. Tanner may have painted this as a symbol with civil rights in mind.	Wynkoop House, Old Haarlem	New Britain Museum of American Art, 1984.86. Oil on canvas, 18 1/2 x 13 1/4 in. American realism		
c. 1888 29 years old			untitled landscape (Female figure with basket and trail leading to houses)	Hearne Fine Art. Oil on canvas, framed size: 21" x 17"		
1887-1888 28–29 years old	Tanner made illustrations for Harper's Young People.	He illustrated for Kate Upson Clark, her story "Old Win-ne-wan's Star" in Harper's Young People, printed as wood engraving January 10, 1888.	It Must Be My Very Star, Come Down to Brooklyn, After All		It Must Be My Very Star, Come Down to Brooklyn, After All, by Henry Ossawa Tanner	
1882-1888	While still living in Philadelphia, Tanner did a religious artwork. This was years before The Thankful Poor and Daniel in the Lion's Den (1896). His teacher may have been sending students' work in to magazines.	Joachim, father of Mary, maternal grandfather of Jesus	Joachim Leaving the Temple	The Baltimore Museum of Art, 2008.111. Opaque watercolor and graphite, inscribed with a stylus, on paper, 558 × 392 mm. (21 15/16 × 15 7/16 in.)		
c. 1889 30 years old	Tanner visits Highlands, North Carolina, with the idea that he could make money with his camera and pay for the trip.	Painting likely of the Cumberland Mountains.	Mountain Landscape, Highlands North Carolina	Doris Ulman Galleries, Berea College Art Department, Kentucky, 140.O.95. Oil on canvas. 23" x 36"		
c. 1889 30 years old	visits Highlands, NC		Mountain Landscape, Highlands, North Carolina	Smithsonian American Art Museum. Watercolor, pencil, and colored pencil on paper mounted on paperboard, 10 7/8 x 15 in. (27.5 x 38.1 cm)		Same image, different result in digtization
c. 1889 30 years old	visits Highlands, N.C.		Highlands, N.C.	Smithsonian American Art Museum, 1983.95.26. Watercolor and pencil on paper, 10 7/8 x 15 in.		
1889 30 years old	visits Highlands, NC		Waterfall, North Carolina	The Charleston Renaissance Gallery. Oil on canvas 21 5/8 x 14 inches		
1889 30 years old		Similarity: Tanner painted a work titled "Scrub Pine Land", exhibited in 1894 and unknown today, painted in Florida.	untitled landscape	Robert W. Woodruff Library, Atlanta University Center, Oil on canvas, 33 1/2 x 27 1/4 in.		
undated, c. 1889-1890 30–31 years old			Georgia Landscape	Morris Museum of Art, Augusta, Georgia. Oil on canvas, 17 3/4 x 32 1/4 in.		
undated		Painting signature has "Henry" spelled out, which is unusual. African American figures?	untitled	Private collection. Oil on canvas, 9 x 13 in.		
1891 32 years old	Beginning January 1891, attending school at the Academie Julian in Paris	Painted in France while attending school. The figure between the two dogs in the background is a pentimento of a gypsy boy, a street performer. Tanner painted the petit savoyard (young Gypsy street performer) into the picture, but later removed it, creating the shadowy image.	A Horse and Two Dogs in a Landscape	Woodrow Wilson Middle School Collection, Philadelphia. American realism or French academic	, by Henry Ossawa Tanner	
1891 32 years old	Beginning January 1891, attending school at the Academie Julian in Paris	Painted in France while attending school. Appears to be imitating the painting Anguish by August Friedrich Schenck. Tanner's painting is retitled, and painted in a more impressionist style.	Behold! The Lamb of God	Private collection. Oil on canvas, 13.12 x 18.12 in. (33.3 x 46 cm.)		Anguish by August Friedrich Schenk appeared in the Paris Salon, 1878 under its French title Angoisses.
undated	Attended Philadelphia Academy of Fine Art about 1879–1885. Struggled to make living as artist. Beginning January 1891, attended school at the Academie Julian in Paris	Place and time painted unknown. Clearly imitating Briton Riviere's Daniel's Answer to the King	untitled. Online labeled Daniel in the Lion's Den	Private collection. Oil on canvas, 29 1/2 x 43 in.		Daniel's Answer to the King by Briton Riviere, 1890.
1891 32 years old	First year in France. Summering on west coast of Brittany.	Portrait of a woman apparently from the French West Indies. Her dress marks her as not being of the peasant class. This image is a rare Tanner portrait, one of about 7 known images he painted of a colored person. Impressionist techniques being used in this image.	Woman from the West Indies, 1891, Brittany, France.	Impressionism		
c. 1890s	Tanner arrived in France in January 1891.	Night scene of a couple standing in the rain in Paris.	Street Scene, Paris	Colby College Museum of Art, 1972.052. Waterville, Maine. Pastel on paper, 13 × 9 3/4 in. (33 × 24.8 cm.)		
1891 32 years old	Tanner arrived in France in January 1891. Summered in Brittany at Pont-Aven and Concarneau. Bois d'Amour is near Pont-Aven. Concarneau is about 15 km from Pont-Aven.	Woman and child walking on a path in the woods.	Bois d'Amour			
undated	Tanner had the opportunity to paint this at any time after 1890.	Painting came up for auction in 2023 in Bordeaux, France.	Brittany, mother and her child on the road Bretagne, mère et son enfant sur la route	Private collection. 35 x 55.5 cm		
1891 32 years old	Summers in Brittany, spends time at Concarneau		Concarneau			
c. 1891-1893 32–34 years old	Tanner studied at the Académie Julian from 1891 to 1893.	Study at the Académie Julian, where instruction centered around making images of nude models.	Half-Length Study of a Negro Man	Detroit Institute of Arts. Charcoal and pastel on cream laid paper, 19 1/2 x 9 3/8 in. (24.6 x 23.9 cm).		Smithsonian American Art Museum, 1983.95.24. Study of a Young Man, no date. Conté crayon and pencil on paper, 12 1/4 x 9 5/8 in. (31.0 x 24.3 cm).
c. 1881-1893	Assuming this is part of his artist's studies in the Académie Julian, it would date from his arrival in 1891 until he left in 1893		Portrait of a Young Girl	Smithsonian American Art Museum, 1983.95.46. Conte crayon, pencil and pastel on paper, 8 7/8 x 6 1/4 in. (22.5 x 16.0 cm)		
undated possibly c. 1881-1893	Assuming this is part of his artist's studies in the Académie Julian, it would date from his arrival in 1891 until he left in 1893.	Painting in French art gallery Proantic	Etude d'Un Homme Barbu or Study Of A Bearded Man	Private collection. Charcoal on paper, 25.5 x 20 cm.		
1892 33 years old	Summer 1892 in Brittany. Spring 1893, Paris. Possibly, early summer 1893, Brittany. Spring/Summer 1893 returned to United States. Attended World's Columbian Exposition	Study begun in Brittany in 1892 for painting The Bagpipe Lesson, finished by May 1893.	Study for the Bagpipe Lesson	Smithsonian American Art Museum, 1983.95.42. Oil on paperboard, 5 x 5 15/16 in.		
1893 34 years old	Summer 1892 in Brittany. Spring 1893, Paris. Possibly, early summer 1893, Brittany. Spring/Summer 1893 returned to United States.	First attempt to get a painting into the Paris Salon, in 1893; it was rejected but later accepted in 1895. Painted with an American painter's eye, not with symbolism or impressionism. Displayed at World's Columbian Exposition, in the exposition catalog.	The Bagpipe Lesson	Hampton University Museum. Oil on canvas, 45 x 68 3/4" (114.3 x 174.63 cm) American Realism or French Academic		
c. 1893 34 years old	Summer 1892 in Brittany. Spring 1893, Paris. Possibly, early summer 1893, Brittany. Spring/Summer 1893 returned to United States.	Tanner moving toward impressionism in this work.	The Edge of the Forest Bois d’Amour	Rosenfeld Fine Arts. Oil on wood panel, 7"/4 X 101/2" (18.42 x 26.67 cm)		
c. 1890s		Tanner painted African Americans (women and children) in what was probably Philadelphia in the late 19th century.	Feeding Chickens	Private collection. Oil on canvas, 14 x 24". Sold at New Orleans Auction Galleries.	Feeding Chickens, by Henry Ossawa Tanner	
1894 35 years old	Several trips to Florida. One trip in 1878. Jacksonville & Enterprise, Florida in 1889. Tallahassee, Florida in 1894.	Tanner exhibited at Earle's in 1894, including "Scrub-Pine Land," "Orange Grove" and "Young Orange Trees".	Florida	Private collection. Oil on canvas, 18 x 22 in.		Florida.
1894 35 years old	In 1894 Tanner exhibited paintings titled Lake Monroe and Evening on the St. Johns at Earle's Galleries. The location of either painting is unknown.	The date is in the lower right corner.	untitled landscape	DuSable Museum of African American History		
1893-1894 34–35 years old	Summer 1892 in Brittany. Spring 1893, Paris. Possibly, early summer 1893, Brittany. Spring/Summer 1893 returned to United States. Return to Paris in fall of 1894. Submitted to Paris Salon in spring 1894 as The Music Lesson	Date on painting 1893. Early name in newspapers was The First Lesson. Painted to show multiple light sources. Brushwork style links to The Thankful Poor and Spinning by Firelight.	The Banjo Lesson or La Lecon de Musique (The Music Lesson)	Hampton University Museum. Oil on canvas, 49 x 35/2" (124.46 x 90.17 cm). American Realism blended with Impressionism		Painting in Harper's Young People, Dec 5, 1893.
1894 35 years old		The final painting was exhibited in the spring of 1894.	The Thankful Poor	Art Bridges. Oil on canvas, height: 90.1 cm (35.5 in); width: 112.4 cm (44.2 in). American Realism blended with Impressionism		Study for the Thankful Poor, DuSable Museum of African American History.
1894 35 years old			Spinning by Firelight or The Boyhood of George Washington Gray	Yale University Art Gallery, 1996.58.1. Oil on canvas, 44 1/4 x 66 1/4. American Realism blended with Impressionism		
1894 35 years old	Tanner returned to France from the United States in September 1894.		Crossing the Atlantic or Return Home	Smithsonian American Art Museum, 1983.95.28. Watercolor and pencil on paper mounted on paperboard, 9 7/8 x 13 1/2 in. (25.2 x 34.2 cm)		Shore Landscape with building and Dock, undated. Private collection, oil on panel, 9 1/4" x 13 1/2".
1894 35 years old	Tanner returned to France from the United States in September 1894.	This image in France would have been painted after his return.	Pont-Aven	DuSable Museum. Oil on canvas, 23.5 x 19.75 inches		
1895 36 years old		Tanner made at least three studies for The Young Sabot Maker before his final painting.	Study for the Young Sabot Maker	Smithsonian American Art Museum, 1983.95.208. Oil on canvas, 16 1/4 x 13 in. (41.3 x 33.0 cm.)		Study for the Young Sabot Maker, 1893. Metropolitan Museum of Art, 1975.27.2. Watercolor and gouache on white wove paper, height: 38.7 cm (15.2 in); width: 25.9 cm (10.1 in.)
1895 36 years old		Entry in Paris Salon, 1895.	The Young Sabot Maker	The Nelson-Atkins Museum of Art. Oil on canvas, height: 120.3 cm (47.3 in); width: 89.8 cm (35.3 in). American Realism, French Academic		Study for the Young Sabot Maker, Paris 1893. Smithsonian American Art Museum, 1983.95.49. Pastel and ink on paper mounted on paperboard, 10 3/8 x 8 3/8.
1895 36 years old		Boy holding a binioù (Breton bagpipe). Dates to visit to Pont-Aven, Brittany in 1894.	The Bagpipe Player	Private collection. Oil on canvas, 21 1/2 x 18 1/2 in.		
c. 1895 36 years old		Early exploration of biblical subject	The Annunciation to the Shepherds	The Nelson-Atkins Museum of Art. Oil on canvas, height: 120.3 cm (47.3 in); width: 89.8 cm (35.3 in). American Realism, French Academic		
1895 36 years old	Living in Paris	Early entry into Tanner's chosen field of Christian artwork	Adoration of the Golden Calf	Hampton University Museum. Oil on canvas, 33 x 41 cm. (13 x 16.1 in.)		
1895 36 years old	Living in Paris	In the 1895 Paris Salon, he exhibited "pastel of New Jersey coast by moonlight". Under matting, this painting had "Paris 1895." Possibly depicts a buoy particular to "Quai d'Issy on the Seine River."	Marshes in New Jersey	Smithsonian American Art Museum, 1894.149.3. pastel and pencil on paper mounted on paperboard, sheet: 9 1/2 x 12 1/2 in.		
undated	After Daniel in the Lion's Den, Rodman Wanamaker sponsored trips to Palestine/Egypt (January- April 1897, October 1898 - March 1899) to give Tanner the places' look.	Two paintings that are intended to be oriental, but don't have the same look as those found in the 1897, 1898–99, 1908 and 1912 trips. Question to be answered: could these predate Tanner's trips to the Middle East?			untitled painting, in oriental style. Oil on board, 27 1/4" x 21.5"	Mistitled "Forest Scene" at auction. Oil on canvas board, 18" x 13 1/2".
1896 37 years old	Living in Paris		View of the Seine, Looking Toward Notre Dame	Private collection. Formerly held by Michael Rosenfeld Gallery. Oil on canvas, 14 7/8 x 20 1/8.		
1896 37 years old	Living in Paris	Entered Daniel in the Lion's Den in the 1896 Paris Salon, his third year in the event. This is a photo of that version, which is now lost. Tanner repainted the picture later, in a horizontal layout.	Daniel in the Lion's Den	Location unknown.		New version, painted 1914–1917.
1896 37 years old	Living in Paris	Les Invalides, a complex that includes Napoleon's tomb and the Hôtel des Invalides (a home for disabled military veterans)	Les Invalides	Terra Foundation for American Art, Daniel J. Terra Collection. Oil on canvas, height: 33.3 cm (13.1 in); width: 41 cm (16.1 in)		
1896 37 years old	Signed reverse of painting: To Mrs. Crane / Souvenir of the Sands of NJ / H.O. Tanner / 1896 (verso)		Sands of New Jersey or Souvenir of the Sands of NJ	Private collection. Oil on panel 4 3/4 by 6 1/4 inches (12 by 15.9 cm)	Sands of New Jersey, by Henry Ossawa Tanner	
1896 37 years old	Living in Paris	Won a gold medal at Paris Salon 1897, bought by French Government, brought honor to Tanner that he no longer had to submit paintings to a committee before entering them in the Salon.	Raising of Lazarus or Resurrection of Lazarus	Musée d'Orsay, RF 1980 173. Oil on canvas, 37 x 48 in. (94.7 x 120.5 cm.)	Resurrection of Lazarus, article	
c. 1897 38 years old	January- April 1897, trip to Palestine and Egypt		A Mosque in Cairo	Private collection. Oil on canvas, 9 1/2 x 13 in.		
1897 38 years old	January- April 1897, trip to Palestine and Egypt	Mosque of Qaitbey	Interior of a Mosque, Cairo	Museum of Fine Arts, Boston, 2005.92. Oil on canvas, height: 52.1 cm (20.5 in) Edit this at Wikidata; width: 66 cm (25.9 in)		
1897 38 years old	January- April 1897, trip to Palestine and Egypt		Cairo boatman	Private collection. Oil on panel, 32 x 51 cm-12.5 x 20 in.		
1897 38 years old	January- April 1897, trip to Palestine and Egypt		Cairo boatman	Private collection. Oil on panel, 8 1/2 x 13 in.		
1897-1899 38–40 years old	January- April 1897, trip to Palestine and Egypt, second trip October 1898 - March 1899		Seated Arab	Private collection. Oil on wood, 331x235 mm; 13x9 1/4 inches.	Seated Arab, by Henry Ossawa Tanner	
c. 1897 38 years old	January- April 1897, trip to Palestine and Egypt, second trip October 1898 - March 1899		Study of an Arab	Private collection. Oil on board 33 x 24 cm (13 x 9 1/2 in.)		
February 1897 38 years old	January- April 1897, trip to Palestine and Egypt	Reverse of image had "Cairo Feb 1897". Front has Paris, Oct 1898	untitled (A Water Carrier)	Private collection. oil on panel, 10 by 8 inches (25.4 by 20.3 cm)		
undated possibly c. 1896-1899	January- April 1897, trip to Palestine and Egypt; January–April 1897, trip to Palestine and Egypt	Painting not dated; based on subject and realisim-style, the painting might be placed on his 1st or 2nd trip to the Near East.	untitled (Arab Musician)	Private collection. oil on canvas board, artist's name on verso, 9" x 11", frame 13 3/4" x 15 3/4"		
c. 1897 38 years old	In January–April 1897, Tanner went on a trip to Palestine and Egypt. He was sponsored to increase his knowledge of biblical scenery.	The final painting is lost, but this study survives.	Study for the Jew's Wailing Place or The Wailing Wall	Museum of Art, Rhode Island School of Design. Oil on canvas 25 1/2 x 19 1/4" (64.77 x 48.9 cm)		Original painting Wailing Wall, 1897.
c. 1897 38 years old	In January–April 1897, Tanner went on a trip to Palestine and Egypt. He was sponsored to increase his knowledge of biblical scenery.	He had painted lions before in a zoo setting; these he placed in a desert.	Lion Drinking	Private collection. Oil on cardboard, height: 23.5 cm (9.2 in); width: 37.5 cm (14.7 in)		
c. 1897-1898 38–39 years old	In January–April 1897, Tanner went on a trip to Palestine and Egypt. He was sponsored to increase his knowledge of biblical scenery.	He had painted lions before in a zoo setting; these he placed in a desert.	Lions in the Desert or Still Hunt	Smithsonian American Art Museum, 1983.95.184. Oil on canvas mounted on plywood 15 1/2 x 29 3/8" (39.37 x 74.61 cm)		
Undated; probably c. 1897-1898 38–39 years old	Likely painted during his first (January- April 1897) or second (Oct 98-March 99) trip to the Middle East.		The Canyon	Smithsonian American Art Museum, 1983.95.183. Oil on canvas, 16 x 13 in. (40.6 x33.0 cm.)		
c. 1897 38 years old	Tanner stopped in Venice in the spring of 1897, after visit to Palestine and Egypt.		Venice	Oil on canvas on plywood, 274x228 mm; 10 7/8x9 inches.		
undated			Portrait of Isaac	Charcoal on paper, 22" x 18".	Portrait of Isaac, by Henry Ossawa Tanner	
August–September 1897 38 years old	In Kansas City, Kansas, seeing his family	Tanner painted this about August–September 1897 after visiting the Near East. The subject is his father, Benjamin Tucker Tanner.	Bishop Benjamin Tucker Tanner	Private collection. Oil on canvas, 13 X 9 3/4" (33.02 x 23.49 cm)		
August–September 1897 38 years old	In Kansas City, Kansas, seeing his family	Tanner painted an image of his father that is dated. The image of his mother Sarah Elizabeth Tanner without date has the same red background and is the same size.	Portrait of the Artist's Mother	National Museum of American Art, Smithsonian Institution. Oil on plywood, 13 X 9 3/4".		
August–September 1897 38 years old	In Kansas City, Kansas, seeing his family in summer/fall, 1897	Portrait of Sarah Elizabeth Tanner	Portrait of the artist's mother	Philadelphia Museum of Art, EW1993-61-1. Oil on canvas, 29 1/4 x 39 1/2" (74.29 x 100.33 cm)		
c. 1897 38 years old	After his trip to the Middle East in the spring of 1897, Tanner visited his parents in Kansas City, Kansas in August/September. Return to Paris in September.		Kansas City, Kansas	Smithsonian American Art Museum, 1983.95.30. Watercolor and pencil on paper mounted on paperboard, sheet: 9 7/8 x 13 7/8 in.		Smithsonian American Art Museum, 1983.95.29. Watercolor and pencil on paper mounted on paperboard, sheet: 9 7/8 x 13 7/8 in. (25.1 x 35.3 cm)
1898 39 years old	Visits U.S. in August 1897 after return to Paris from Holy Land. Returns to Paris September 1897 from US. Announces, that after he returns to Paris, he will paint an Eastern type Virgin Mary dressed in clothes from the Holy Land. Tanner probably did not use Jessie McCauley Olssen (his future wife) for the girl. Entry in 1898 Paris Salon.	The Virgin Mary is visited by the archangel Gabriel, who delivers the Annunciation of the Lord, the announcement that she would bear Jesus.	The Annunciation	Philadelphia Museum of Art, W1899-1-1. 57 x 71 1/4 in (1,448.82 mm x 1,811.27 mm)	Article for The Annunciation.	Study for The Annunciation, 1898. Smithsonian American Art Museum, 1983.95.187. Oil on wood, 8 1/2 x 10 3/4 in.
c. 1898 39 years old	Henry Ossawa Tanner meets Jessie Macauley Olssen in the summer of 1898.	Portrait of Jessie Jessie Macauley Olssen, Tanner's wife	Portrait of the Artist's Wife	Smithsonian American Art Museum, 1983.95.211. Oil on fiberboard, 22 3/8 x 18 7/8 in. (56.8 x 47.9 cm.)		
1898 39 years old	Entry in the 1900 Paris Salon and later at Pennsylvania Academy of the Fine Arts's 70th Annual Exhibition (1901), the Minneapolis Society of Fine Arts exhibition (1902) and the Lewis and Clark Centennial Exposition in Portland, Oregon (1905).	Mary with infant Jesus (under the blanket and halo.)	Mary or La Sainte-Marie	La Salle University Art Museum, 84-P-298. Oil on canvas, 34 1/8 x 42 5/8 in. (86.7 x 108.3 cm).		
c. 1899 40 years old			Head of a Girl in Jerusalem (The Artist's Wife)	Formerly in Evans-Tibbs collection. Oil on artists board.		
1899 Reworked 1918–1920. 40 years old	Tanner took a second trip to the Holy Land, in 1898–99. Began recurring theme of Joseph and Mary fleeing for Egypt.	Thought to be the study used for Nicodemus in Nicodemus Visiting Jesus. This image was reworked in 1918-1920 and may have changed the look of the subject.	Head of a Jew in Palestine.	Smithsonian American Art Museum, 1983.95.189. Oil on canvas, 24 x 21 1/4 in. (61 x 53.9 cm).		
c. 1897-1899 38–40 years old	Tanner took a second trip to the Holy Land, in 1898–99.	No date; this should date to one of his first two Mideast Trips.	Head of a Woman in Jerusalem	Smithsonian American Art Museum, 1983.95.194. Oil on canvas mounted on cardboard, 17 7/8 x 13 5/8 in. (45.4 x 34.6 cm.)		
c. 1897-1899 38–40 years old	Tanner took a second trip to the Holy Land, in 1898–99.	No date; this should date to one of his first two Mideast Trips.	A View of Palestine	Frances Lehman Loeb Art Center, Vassar College, 1946.3.3. Oil on canvas, 22 1/2 x 37 in.	A View in Palestine, by Henry Ossawa Tanner	Landscape Near Jerusalem. Published in June 1900 Brush and Pencil.
c. 1898 39 years old		Exhibited in May 1899 at the Pennsylvania Museum and School of Art and January 1901 at the Pennsylvania Academy of the Fine Arts.	And He Vanished Out of Their Sight or And He Disappeared Out of Their Sight	Location unknown (possibly lost). Oil on canvas, 25 3/4 x 32 in. Photo in collections of Pennsylvania Academy of the Fine Arts and the Smithsonian Archives of American Art.		1898 Study, And He Disappeared Out of Their Sight, Smithsonian American Art Museum, 1983.95.200. Oil on plywood, 10 5/8 x 13 3/4 in. (27.1 x 35.0 cm.)
1899 40 years old	Tanner took a second trip to the Holy Land, in 1898–99.	The painting illustrate the biblical story of Nicodemus a Pharisee who visited Jesus to talk to him. 1899 Paris Salon entry.	Nicodemus Visiting Jesus. or Nicodemus or Nicodemus Coming to Christ	Pennsylvania Academy of the Fine Arts, 1900.1. Oil on canvas, 33.11/16 × 39.5 in (85.5 × 100.3 cm).	Nicodemus Visiting Christ, article.	Study for Nicodemus, 1899. Private collection. Oil on canvas mounted on cardboard, 7 1/4 x 9 3/8 in. One of the four paintings photographed by the Harmon Foundation, exhibited by them in 1931.
1899 40 years old	Tanner took a second trip to the Holy Land, in 1898–99. Began recurring theme of Joseph and Mary fleeing for Egypt.	A very similar version (At the Gates) was painted in 1927-1927.	Flight Into Egypt.	Amistad Research Center, ARC.HTANN.1900.01. Oil on panel, circa 1926–27. 610x483 mm; 24x19 in. Impressionism		
1899 40 years old	Tanner took a second trip to the Holy Land, in 1898–99. Began recurring theme of Joseph and Mary fleeing for Egypt.	Exhibited 1899 at the Carnegie Institute, along with Judas.	Flight Into Egypt.	Detroit Institute of Arts, 69.452. Oil on canvas. Unframed: 19 3/4 × 25 1/2 inches (50.2 × 64.8 cm). Impressionism	Article for Flight into Egypt.	
c. 1899 40 years old	Published in the June 1900 issue of the Brush and Pencil journal or magazine.	Scene at Czernay la Ville	The Laundress	Impressionism		
c. 1890/1899			Still Life With Apples	Georgia Museum of Art, University of Georgia, GMOA 2011.604. Oil on canvas.		
c. 1899 40 years old		Tanner displayed a work at the Carnegie Institute, now lost.	Judas.	Painted over to make the 1924 painting Two Disciples at the Tomb	Only one known photo of the painting, may still be in copyright.	
c. 1900 41 years old		Displayed at the annual exhibition of the Pennsylvania Academy of Fine Arts, 1900, along with Nicodemus and Hills Near Jerusalem. Painting of the death of Judas. Also exhibited 1908 at his solo exhibition.	And He Went Out and Hanged Himself or Death of Judas	Location unknown, possibly lost.		
c. 1899 Date based on that of final painting 40 years old		Study painting, used in Christ Among the Doctors	Scribes or Study for Christ Among the Doctors	Private collection. Oil on [base not identified], 21 ¾" by 18"	Study for Jesus among the Doctors, by Henry Ossawa Tanner	
c. 1899-1900 40–41 years old			Christ Among the Doctors or Christ in the Temple	Location unknown.	Christ Among the Doctors, by Henry Ossawa Tanner	Nicodemus or Study for Christ Among the Doctors or Portrait of a Bearded Man, undated. Private collection. Oil on canvas, 13 3/4 x 10 5/8 in. Painting was handed down in Tanner's family, through a nephew.
c. 1900 40 years old		The lost painting Christ in the Temple may be glimpsed in this photo from 1900.	Picture of Tanner in his studio painting Christ in the Temple also called Christ Among the Doctors	Photo from the journal Brush and Pencil, volume 6, issue 3, June 1900, article titled: "Henry O. Tanner, Painter", pages 97–107.	Picture of Tanner in his workshop, painting Christ In the Temple or Christ Among the Doctors	
c. 1900-1905 41–46 years old		"Jesus meditating as he waits for his crown of thorns and purple robe, in which he would be mocked as the 'King of the Jews.'"	The Savior.	Smithsonian American Art Museum, 1983.95.191. Oil on canvas mounted to plywood. 29 1/8 x 21 3/4 in. (73.9 x 55.3 cm)		
c. 1900 41 years old			The Seine, Evening.	Norton Museum of Art Oil on canvas, 10 1/8 x 8 in. (25.7 x 20.3 cm)		
c. 1900 41 years old			untitled or Parisian Street Scene	Private collection. Oil on panel, 5 3/4 x 7 in.		
c. 1900 41 years old			untitled. (View of the Seine)	Private collection. Oil on plywood, 11,5 x 16,5 cm. (4.5 x 6.5 in.)		
c. 1900 41 years old	This painting has been called a work of symbolism. Similar to symbolist painting by Franz von Stuck, Sin. Tanner has decapitated Salome with shadow. The blue, sometimes a spiritual color is unpleasant here, speaking of sin, judgement.	Painting of Salome with the head of John the Baptist at her feet. Donated to Smithsonian by Jesse Tanner (Henry O. Tanner's son). Painted on the opposite side of the canvas as Moses and the Burning Bush (abandoned).	Salome	Smithsonian American Art Museum, 1893.95.207A. Oil on canvas, 45 7/8 x 35 1/4 in.		
c. 1900 41 years old		Tanner painted a portrait of his wife Jessie Macauley Olssen.	Jessie Macauley Olssen	Private collection. Oil on canvas, 13 x 9.5 in. (33 x 24.1 cm.)		
c. 1900 41 years old		John Olssen, father of Tanner's wife Jessie.	John Olssen	Oil on canvas, left 73 x 54 cm - 28.7 x 21.2 in.		
c. 1900 41 years old	Tanner did nude portraits as studies at both the Academy of Fine Arts in Philadelphia and the Academie Julian in Paris. This was published in 1900; its creation date is unknown.	Study around the idea, "And Mary pondered all these things in her heart."	Study	Location unknown. Charcoal on paper.		
undated, possibly c. 1901			untitled (nocturnal landscape)	Johnson Museum of Art, Cornell University, 79.029.002. Oil on canvas, 26 1/4 x 19 3/4 inches (66.7 x 50.2 cm).		
undated	American artists in Paris hold separate year-end exposition, December 1901.	In a 1901 exposition, Tanner entered a work, "woman's head In the firelight". May have no connection to Smithsonian's "Profile of a Woman's head."	Profile of a Woman's Head.	Smithsonian American Art Museum, 1983.95.201. Oil on wood, 14 1/8 x 11 3/4 in. (35.8 x 30.0 cm.)		
c. 1902 43 years old	Displayed at 1902 Salon, but did not get a good reception in French press. Tanner painted The Pilgrims of Emmaus over it.	He painted himself into the picture, with his wife's sister, Elna Olssen Charles, playing piano.	La Musique or The Cello Lesson or The Duo or Chamber Music	Lost painting. Tanner painted over it, with the painting Pilgrims of Emmaus.		
c. 1902 43 years old	Bishop Joseph Crane Hartzell and his wife (Jennie Culver) were instrumental in Tanner's success. They bought his collection of paintings in 1891, to finance his trip to Europe.		Portrait of Bishop Joseph Crane Hartzell	Hampton University Museum. Oil on canvas, 47 xX 36" (119.38 x 91.44 cm).		
c. 1902 43 years old		Paris, view from the right bank of the Seine looking west toward the twin towers of the Palais du Trocadéro.	The Seine	National Gallery of Art, 1971.57.1. Oil on canvas, 22.8 x 33 cm (9 x 13 in.)		
c. 1901-1903 42–44 years old		London landscape	Low Tide, Cannon Street Bridge	Philadelphia Museum of Art, 2005–86–1. Oil on canvas board, 14 × 20 inches (35.6 × 50.8 cm)		
c. 1898	Printed September 1902 in the Ladies Home Journal, part of a series of four mothers, "Mothers of the Bible", Sarah, Hagar, Rachel, and Mary.	Tanner wrote the text to accompany the painting.	Sarah from Mothers of the Bible series.	Painting lost.		Study of Issac for Mothers of the Bible, 1898. Howard University Department of Art, HUGA052. Charcoal, 24 × 15 in. (61 × 38.1 cm)
c. 1902 43 years old	Printed October 1902 in the Ladies Home Journal, part of a series of four mothers, "Mothers of the Bible", Sarah, Hagar, Rachel, and Mary.	"And Abraham rose up early in the morning, and took bread, and a bottle of water, and gave it unto Hagar. . . .and sent her away; and she departed and wandered in the wilderness of Beer-sheba--GENESIS XXI, 14."	Hagar from Mothers of the Bible series.	Painting lost.		
c. 1902-1903 43–44 years old	Printed November 1902 in the Ladies Home Journal, part of a series of four mothers, "Mothers of the Bible", Sarah, Hagar, Rachel, and Mary.	Tanner wrote the text to accompany the painting. Jacob asks Rachel to marry, her father watching.	Rachel from Mothers of the Bible series.	Painting lost.		Study for Rachel from Mothers of the Bible, c. 1898. Smithsonian American Art Museum, 1983.95.31. Charcoal on paper, Sheet: 23 x 13 5/8 in. (58.4 x 34.6 cm)
c. 1902-1903 43–44 years old	Printed January 1903 in the Ladies Home Journal, part of a series of four mothers, "Mothers of the Bible", Sarah, Hagar, Rachel, and Mary.	Tanner used his wife Jessie as the model for "many of his studies" for the series, including Mary.	Mary from Mothers of the Bible series.	Painting lost.	Mary sitting with her son Jesus.	Study of Mary (from Mothers of the Bible), circa 1902–1903. Howard University, 38.1.D. Charcoal on paper, 21 1/4 x 15 in.
c. 1902-1903 43–44 years old		The museum RMN-Grand Palais (Orsay Museum) dates this 1903–1904.	Christ and His Disciples on the Road to Bethany	RMN-Grand Palais, Musée d'Orsay, RF 1980 174. Oil on canvas, 373/83 X 47 '3/16" (95 x 121.5 cm) or H. 66.0; L. 96.0 cm.		Smithsonian Archives of American Art. Photo in Henry Tanner papers, mislabeled on back "Return From the Cross".
c. 1902-1903 43–44 years old		A work of religion centering on Gospel of John (10:14—16). Also a work of racial equality in that Tanner "saw the theme of the good shepherd in terms of racial and social equality, as did his father." Important to him, Tanner would paint the Good Shepherd theme at least 15 times.	The Good Shephard.	Zimmerli Art Museum at Rutgers University, 1988.0063. Oil on canvas, height: 770 mm (30.31 in); width: 920 mm (36.22 in)		
c. 1902-1908 43–49 years old	Tanner went to the Holy Land in 1898-1899 and to Granada in Dec 1902.	Both places affect this image: the mount of Temptation was painted before this work. In Granada, Tanner encountered El Greco's work and it affected the way he painted people. This painting study is on the back of Salome.	Study for Moses and the Burning Bush.	Smithsonian American Art Museum, 1983.95.207B. Oil on canvas. 29 1/8 x 21 3/4 in. (73.9 x 55.3 cm) "Moses and the Burning Bush" at exhibitions in 1908.		Pastoral scene, Palestine. Private collection, formerly owned by Hampton Institute. Assessed as c. 1895, but prob 1897/1898-1899, when Tanner traveled to Palestine.
1903 44 years old	Tanner took his wife Jessie to Granada, where they lived from January–March 1903		Interior Scene or The Stairwell, Granada	Private collection. Oil on canvas, 22 3/4" (58 cm) x 21 3/4" (55 cm)		
undated		Place of image not known. While the place might be Palestine or North Africa, it might also be Granada.	Village Scene	Private collection. Oil on canvas, 12 x 15.75 in.		
1904 45 years old	Entered into the 1906 Paris Salon. Tanner encounters the paintings of El Greco in Granada and begins to paint people in an "elongated figure style".	"drawn from the Gospel of John (19:25—27)..." Mary, (Jesus' mother in front) and the disciple "whom he loved". The blonde woman is prob. Mary Magdalene; the woman behind the disciple prob Mary the wife of Cleophas.	Return of the Holy Women or Le Retour de la Sainte Femme or Return of the Holy Woman	Cedar Rapids Museum of Art, 23.1. Oil on canvas, 46 1/2 x 35 in. (116.84 x 88.9 cm).		Study for Return of the Holy Woman
1904 45 years old	Painting was covered up, placed underneath the canvas of Daniel in the Lion's Den (1907-1918 version) and rediscovered in 1976. Tanner had been receiving strong criticism during this period in the press.	Draws on scripture: Job 2:7—13 "So went Satan forth from the presence of the Lord, and smote Job with sore boils from the sole of his foot unto his crown... Now when Job's three friends heard of all this evil that was come upon him, they came every one from his own place...So they sat down with him upon the ground seven days and seven nights..." King James Version	Job and his Three Friends	Private collection. Oil on canvas, 41 x 493/4" (104.14 x 126.37 cm)		
1905 46 years old			The Virgin Mary in Meditation	Private collection, Paris. Oil on board, 12 x 9 1/2 inches.	Virgin Mary in Meditation, by Henry Ossawa Tanner	
c. 1905 46 years old		Luke Chapter 10. While Christ is at the home of Mary and Martha, Mary focuses on him. Martha focuses on less important things (elsewhere). Mary sitting with Christ, in a possible study for Christ in the Home of Mary and Martha.	Christ at the Home of Mary.	Norton Museum of Art. Pastel and watercolor on paper, 11 1/2 x 9 1/2" (29.2 x 24.1 cm)		
c. 1905 46 years old	Displayed January 1907, Société Internationale de Peinture et Sculpture. Paris.	Christ sits at the table with Mary, while Martha serves dinner. Shadowy figure in background (pentimento) speculated to be Judas (who had criticized Mary for wasting money on perfume, spread on Christ's feet.) Possibly deliberate mixing of biblical stories.	Christ in the home of Mary and Martha	Carnegie Museum of Art, 07.3. Oil on canvas, 51 ½ × 41 ½ in130.81 × 105.41 cm.		Study for Christ at the Home of Martha and Mary
1905-1906 46–47 years old	Tanner enters into the 19th Annual exhibition of American paintings at the Art Institute of Chicago.	Gospel of John (20:2-6). Peter and John peering into Jesus' tomb, their faces lit by unearthly light. Highlight of Tanner's career, winning Harris Prize, top prize among top competitors.	The Two Disciples at the Tomb	Art Institute of Chicago, 1906.300. Oil on canvas, 51 x 41 5/8” (129.54 x 105.73 cm)	(From left:) Peter, John	Study for the Disciple Peter, c. 1905. Smithsonian American Art Museum, 1983.95.38. Conte crayon and charcoal on paper, mounted on paperboard 185/16 x 143/4" (47.15 x 37.47:cm)
1905 or 1906 46 or 47 years old	Tanner's next major picture after The Two Disciples at the Tomb One of two entries for 1906 in the Paris Salon.	Wins silver (second place medal) at Paris Salon bought by French government Tanner "designated hors concours" (top honor, his paintings are beyond competition). This work is painted over the top of another Tanner painting, The Cello Lesson.	The Disciples at Emmaus, or The Pilgrims of Emmaus	Musée d‘Orsay, Paris. Oil on canvas, 73 1/2 x 83 1/2".	Christ (left) meets with two of his disciples, Luke and Cleopas, at Emmaus. (Luke 24:13–27).	
1905 46 years old	Exhibited 1905 at Chicago Art Institute. and his solo exhibition in 1908.	Tanner's rendition of Abraham's Oak which traditionally marks the place where Abraham entertained three angels or where he pitched his tent.	Abraham's Oak or Abraham's Oak Near Hebron	Smithsonian American Art Museum, 1983.95.185. Oil on canvas, 21 3/4 x 28 3/4" (54.4 x 72.8 cm).		
c. 1905 46 years old		Entry into the 1905 Paris Salon, one of two entries Displayed at the annual exhibition at the Chicago Art Institute, along with Abraham's Oak Near Hebron.	The Good Samaritan	Location unknown (possibly lost).		
1905 46 years old	earlier version of this was 1901 Paris Salon entry.	Multiple versions. Original dates back to 1900 titled "Night," owned by Atherton Curtis. This version owned by Robert C. Ogden was made in 1905. A third version, Fishermen's Return dates to about 1919. A fourth version Fisherman's return was made about 1926. A fifth version, Fishermen returning at night was painted about 1930.	Return of the Fisherman	Herbert F. Johnson Museum of Art, Cornell University.	Return of the Fisherman, 1905, a "replica of a work originally called Night." Tanner painted this and the original painting very dark, and this online version has been lightened, perhaps beyond what the artist would have preferred.	Return of the Fisherman without digital lightening.
1905 46 years old	Entered in 1905 Paris Salon, (1 of two entries) won a medal.		Christ Washing the Feet of the Disciples.	Location unknown (possibly lost)		Study for Christ Washing the Feet of the Disciples, not date. Smithsonian American Art Museum, 1983.95.186. Oil on plywood, 6 x 7 7/8 in.
1905 46 years old		The Carnegie Institute announced it would purchase this work.	Judas Covenanting with the High Priests.	Location unknown (possibly lost).		
1907 48 years old	Tanner was unable to enter work in the Paris Salon, due to eye-strain injury.					
18 June 1907 48 years old		Portrait of Jesse Tanner, Henry and Jessie Tanner's son.	Portrait of Jesse When He Was Four Years Old	Oil on panel, 12.9 x 9.4 in. (33 x 24 cm.)		Study for a portrait of Jesse when he was four years old. 1907. Oil on canvas, 13 x 9.4 in. (33 x 24 cm.)
1907-1912 48–53 years old	Tanner took a second trip to the Holy Land, in 1898–99. Second of two entries in 1910 Paris Salon (along with the Three Marys.	Continued recurring (started 1899) theme of Joseph and Mary fleeing for Egypt.	Flight Into Egypt or La fuite en Egypte	Cincinnati Art Museum, 2002.47. Oil on canvas. Measurements:canvas 19 1/2 x 25 3/8 in. (49.6 x 64.4 cm).		
c. 1907 48 years old		Tanner had a history of painting boats. He combined this with his religious art to illustrate a scene from the bible, the miracle of Jesus walking on water. Jesus is represented here as an indistinct presence on the water. The light is the dim of night, the moon reflecting on the water.	The Disciples See Christ Walking on the Water	Des Moines Art Center, 1921.1. Oil on canvas, 51 1/2 x 42 in.		Another version, location unknown. Christ Walking on the Waves is written on the reverse of the photo. Smithsonian Archives of American Art.
c. 1907 48 years old			Moonlight Hebron	Milwaukee Art Museum, M1920.1. Oil on canvas, 25 11/16 × 31 7/8 in. (65.25 × 80.96 cm).	Moonlight Hebron, by Henry Ossawa Tanner	Tangier's Walls, undated. Location unknown. Photo from Smithsonian Archives of American Art.
c. 1899-1923		Painting with man and woman walking hand-in- hand.	Study for Flight to Egypt	Smithsonian American Art Museum, 1983.95.44. Pencil and pastel on paper, 8 1/4 x 11 1/8 in. (21.0 x 28.2 cm)		The Angel of Death Following Two Lovers, undated. DuSable Museum of African American History
date unknown, before 1908			Peter After the Denial	Lost painting.		
c. 1908 49 years old	Painted over three years (1906–1908). Entered in Paris Salon, May 1908.	"Then shall the kingdom of heaven be likened unto ten virgins, which took their lamps, and went forth to meet the bridegroom. And five of them were wise, and five were foolish." Not all the wise virgins are walking...one is on the far left, her lamp on the ground, and she trying to light another's lamp.	The Wise and Foolish Virgins or Behold, The Bridegroom Cometh or Les vierges sages et les vierges folles	Location unknown, possibly lost. 10 ft x 15 ft. Exhibited 1908, 1909, 1921.		
c. 1908 or c. 1909-1910 49 years old		Mary sits sewing, her son Jesus sleeping under a halo (far left). If made 1908–09, this would have been part of Tanner's first American exposition of his religious artworks.	Mary	Weatherspoon Art Museum, 2002.18. Oil on canvas, 31 1/2 x 25"		
undated Possibly 1908 version	Tanner had paintings on this theme from 1908 to 1911, 1922–1924, and a version for sale in 1935.	The painting's name is on the back of the photo at the Smithsonian.	The Hiding of Moses	Location unknown. Photo of painting in Smithsonian Archives of American Art.		
c. 1908 49 years old			Hills of Jerusalem	Private collection. Was in the Michael Rosenfeld Gallery of New York.		
c. 1908 49 years old			Ruth and Naomi	Lost painting.	Ruth and Naomi, by Henry Ossawa Tanner	
c. 1908 49 years old		Tanner displayed a work called Nicodemus in 1908 and 1909 at exhibitions. Photo of the artwork from a 1909 catalog for the Alaska-Yukon-Pacific Exposition of 1909, held in Seattle.	Nicodemus	Location unknown.		
c. 1910 51 years old	Tanner traveled to Morocco, in March–June 1912, to Algiers in 1908, to "the Near East" Oct 98-March 99, and to Palestine and Egypt with stops on the way home in Naples, Rome, Pisa, Florence, and Venice January–April 1897.		Gate in Tangiers	Harvey B. Gantt Center for African-American Arts+Culture. Formerly owned by Vivian and John Hewitt Jr.	Gate in Tangiers	House (Wall) in Blue, c. 1908-1912 Private collection, location unknown.Oil on wood panel, circa 1908–12. 331x235 mm; 13x9 1/4 inches. Titled in pencil, upper right verso.
undated c. 1908-1912	Tanner traveled to Morocco, in March–June 1912, to Algiers in 1908, to "the Near East" Oct 98-March 99, and to Palestine and Egypt with stops on the way home in Naples, Rome, Pisa, Florence, and Venice January–April 1897.		Gate of Tangier	Howard University, 65.1.P. Oil on board, 23 1/4 × 19 in. (59.1 × 48.3 cm)		
c. 1908 49 years old	Tanner went to the Near East for the third time in 1908. The trip took him to Constantine, Algeria. A different version of In Constantine.	Tanner used watercolors on this trip.	Middle Eastern City Scape	Private collection. Watercolor on paper, H 15 1/2", W 11".	Middle Eastern Cityscape	Street Scene in Tangiers
c. 1908 49 years old	Tanner went to the Near East for the third time in 1908. The trip took him to Constantine, Algeria.	Tanner used watercolors on this trip. This version hung in Fernanda and Rodman Wanamaker's apartment in Philadelphia. The picture includes a woman in western clothing (such as one might wear in Paris or New York).	In Constantine	Private collection. Watercolor and gouache on paper, 17 3/4 X 13" (45.09 x 33.02 cm).	In Constantine	Oil painting French Chateau - A Study, c. 1912
c. 1908 49 years old	Tanner went to the Near East for the third time in 1908.		Entrance to the customs house in Tangier	Michael Rosenfeld Gallery. Oil on panel, 22 1/2 x 24 inches.		
c. 1908 or c. 1912-1913	Visits Algeria in February — March 1908; visits Morocco in March — June 1912	Impressionist landscape. 1908. Another version of Flight into Egypt of which Tanner painted more than 15 versions. Joseph, Mary and Jesus flee to Egypt.	Flight into Egypt: Palace of Justice, Tangier or Palace of Justice, Tangier.	Smithsonian American Art Museum, 1970.67. Oil on canvas. 25 5/8 X 31 7/8 (65.09 x 80.96 cm)		
c. 1908-1909			Christ and the Disciples before the Last Supper or Christ with the Canonite woman and her daughter	Spelman College Museum of Fine Art Oil on canvas, 26 x 33 in.		
c. 1908 49 years old	Tanner went to the Near East for the third time in 1908. The trip took him to Constantine, Algeria. Tanner holds an exhibition of his religious paintings in 1908 at the American Art Gallery in New York. It was his first solo exhibition after he grew famous.		A Jerusalem Type	Private collection. Oil on canvas, 18 1/8 x 15 1/8 in. (46 x 38.4 cm.)		
c. 1908-1912 49–53 years old	Visits Algeria in February — March 1908; visits Morocco in March — June 1912	Painting of woman in style of postcards from Tunisia, Morocco and Algeria. (Note: European photographers such as Lehnert & Landrock or Nuredin & Levin made images in North Africa. They created postcards, including images in which local women and girls were posed topless and fully-nude. The photographers had to resort to hiring models, because most women that they encountered would have nothing to do with men outside of their families.) This dress-style represents European fantasy, as women were kept covered in public in North Africa as in other Muslim areas.	unnamed image of a woman.	Private collection. Watercolor and Pencil on Paper. Measure 14"in H x 7 1/2"in W and 20 1/2"in		
c. 1908-1912 49–53 years old	Visits Algeria in February — March 1908; visits Morocco in March — June 1912	Impressionist landscape. Undated. "suggestions of trees, hills, and a faintly discernible human figure."	Scene of Algiers	Smithsonian American Art Museum. Oil on paperboard, 8 1/4 x 10 5/8 in. (21.0 x 27.0 cm.)		
c. 1912 53 years old	Visits Algeria in February — March 1908; visits Morocco in March — June 1912	Impressionist landscape. Undated. Has elements of Flight Into Egypt: a man, woman and donkey.	Algiers or Old Buildings Near Ka-hak	Private collection. Oil on canvas, 31 3/4 x 25 1/2 in.		
undated	unsigned. Attributed to Tanner at auction.	Mary and Mary Magdalene with Jesus, the crosses in the background, a crown of thorns by their side.	Jesus Taken Down From the Cross or Sorrow at the Crucifixion	Private collection. Oil on Canvas. Size: 23 x 31 in.		
c. 1909 50 years old		"The Return of the Holy Woman," with Calvary in the distance, is even more sensitive than the rest. It is so intensely silent.	Return of the Holy Woman or Return of the Holy Women or Return from the Cross	Location unknown.	Return from the Cross or Return of the Holy Women. Names labeled on back of photo from Henry Ossawa Tanner papers, Smithsonian Archives of American Art.	
c. 1910 51 years old		Mary with her baby Jesus (sleeping under a halo by her feet.)	Mary	Formerly in Michael Rosenfeld Gallery. Oil on canvas, 28 3/4 x 23 5/8 in.		
c. 1910 51 years old			Self-Portrait	Smithsonian American Art Museum, 1983.95.34. Pencil and conte crayon on paper, 8 1/2 x 8 3/8		
1910 51 years old	Tanner takes photos of his wife Jessie and son Jesse in costume.	makes painting from photo study. Religious work showing Jesus studying scripture with Mary.	Christ and His Mother Studying the Scriptures	Dallas Museum of Art, 5000380. Oil and canvas; height: 123.8 cm (48.7 in); width: 101.6 cm (40 in)		Jessie and Jesse Tanner as Mary and Jesus, about 1910.
c. 1909-1910 50–51 years old			The Visitation or Mary Visiting Elizabeth	Kalamazoo Institute of Arts, 2005.11. Oil on canvas, 37 1/2 x 42 1/2 in.		
c. 1909-1910 50–51 years old		Divine light illuminates Mary and infant Jesus, Joseph looks from shadows. Jesus has halo, Marys veil glows. Light also comes through the doorway, from outside.	The Holy Family	Muskegon Museum of Art, 1911.1. Oil on canvas, height: 88.9 cm (35 in); width: 108.5 cm (42 3/4 in)		
c. 1910 51 years old			Still life with fruit	Michael Rosenfeld Gallery.		
c. 1910 51 years old			untitled landscape (Snowcapped Mountains Above Habitat)	Hearne Fine Art. Oil on Board, framed Size: 20" x 23" x 2 1/4"		
c. 1910 51 years old	Tanner was elected president of the artists' colony Artistique de Picardie at Le Touquet in 1913. The colony centers on his summer home there.	Evening scene at Le Touquet, Paris-Plage, Pas-de-Calais.	Le Touquet	Des Moines Art Center. Oil on canvas, 51 X 42”. or 28 3/4 x 36 1/4 in. (73 x 92.1 cm.) Accession Number 1941.5		
c. 1910 51 years old		Religious work showing cloudlike angels appearing before the shepherds in the dim light of night. Angels in the image possibly include spokesman angel, angels in a choir, trumpeting angels and calvalry angels.	Angels Appearing before the Shepherds	Smithsonian American Art Museum, 1983.95.195. Oil and canvas; 25 3/4 x 31 7/8 in.		
c. 1910 51 years old		Religious work showing Jesus and His Disciples on the Sea of Galilee.	The Disciples on the Sea of Galilee	Private collection. Oil on artist's board, 10 x 14" (25.4 x 35.56 cm)		
c. 1910 51 years old		Religious work showing Jesus' Disciples on the Sea of Galilee.	Christ and His Disciples on the Sea of Galilee.jpg	Toledo Museum of Art, 1913.127. Oil on canvas, 21 7/8 X 26 1/2"		
c. 1910 51 years old	One of two entries in Paris Salon, 1910. The second entry is Flight to Egypt.	Religious work illustrating Gospel of Mark (16:1—4), showing Mary Magdalene, Mary, mother of James, and Mary Salomé (or Mary of Clopas) as they discover that the stone has been rolled away from the entrance of Christ's tomb.	Three Marys or Les trois Marie approachant du tombeau	Carl Van Vechten Gallery of Fine Arts, Fisk University, Nashville. Oil on canvas, 42 x 50" (106.68 x 127 cm)		Study for the Three Marys
Undated. c. 1910 51 years old			Mary Washing the Feet of Christ or Mary Magdalene Washing the Feet of Christ	Private collection. Oil on panel, 20 x 25 cm. (7.9 x 9.8 in).		
c. 1910 51 years old			Head of Christ	Private collection. Etching on cream laid paper, 76x44 mm; 3x1 3/4 inches		Head of Christ. Private collection, undated. Conte crayon and pencil on cream laid paper, 165x165 mm; 6 1/2x6 1/4 in.
undated probably 1911 52 years old	Tanner has a family with a young child, living in France. Possibly from that era, early 1900s-1910s.	Impressionist landscape of life in Paris.	The Man Who Rented Boats	Smithsonian American Art Museum, 1983.95.203. Oil on canvas mounted on plywood, 9 1/4 x 12 3/8 in. (23.5 x 31.4 cm.)		
c. 1912 53 years old			Return at night from the market	Clark Atlanta University Art Collection, GA, X.041. Oil on canvas, 25 3/4 x 20 5/8		
c. 1912 53 years old	Work that was in private collection, sold in October 2000 at auction for $560,000. At the time, it was a record for Tanner's paintings.	Unidentified painting attributed at auction to Henry Ossawa Tanner. Jesus sits at an "altar table", surrounded by "shrouded women", a chalice in his hand, a crown of thorns on his head.	untitled	Private collection. Oil on canvas, 54 x 79 in.		
c. 1912 53 years old	Tanner painted himself into the painting (far right beside the sitting woman.) Both of the women in the painting were also portraits of people Tanner knew.	Newspaper photo of painting, Boston Evening Transcript, Jun 24, 1914 The painting was exhibited in 1913 in Chicago and New York, was a Paris Salon entry for 1914, and in 1915 won a gold medal at the Panama-Pacific Exposition in San Francisco. Later displayed at the Carnegie Institute (1921), a solo exhibition at the Des Moines, Association of Fine Arts (1921), a solo exhibition at Grand Central Art Galleries, New York (1924), and at the Chicago Art Institute in 1928.	Christ in the Home of Lazarus	Location unknown (possibly lost).	The painting in a 1914 news clipping. Henry Ossawa Tanner is painted into this version.	Study for Christ in the Home of Lazarus, Metropolitan Museum of Art. Oil on canvas, 26 x 29 in. (66 x 73.7 cm).
undated	Tanner painted Atherton Curtis and his wife into this version.	Photo of painting from page 190 of Henry Ossawa Tanner, edited by Dewey F. Mosby.	Christ in the Home of Lazarus	Location unknown (possibly lost). The painting Portrait of Mr. Atherton Curtis and his Wife was rumored to be the remains of this painting, cut down to just the portrait.	Another version of Christ in the home of Lazarus by Henry Ossawa Tanner.	Portrait of Mr. Atherton Curtis and his wife. Smithsonian American Art Museum, 1983.95.192. Oil on plywood, 26 5/8 x 28 7/8 in. (67.6 x 73.3cm.)
undated	Tanner meets Atherton and Louise Curtis in 1897; Tanner and Jessie go to live in the Curtis' artist colony in 1902. Lifelong friendship.				Study for Portrait of Mrs. Atherton Curtis. Smithsonian American Art Museum, 1983.95.33. Charcoal and pastel on paper mounted on paperboard, 18 3/4 x 20 in. (47.6 x 50.8 cm).	
c. 1912 53 years old			Coastal Landscape, France	Michael Rosenfeld Gallery. Oil on gessoed panel, 9.25" x 13"		
1912			A View of Fez	High Museum of Art, 2003.91. Oil on panel, 9 in (22.8 cm); width: 12.5 in (31.7 cm)		
c. 1912 53 years old	Visits Morocco in March–June 1912		Moonrise by Casbah or Morocco	Private collection. Oil on linen canvas, 1912. 540x724 mm; 21 1/2x28 1/2 inches.		City Walls, Tangier, undated. Location unknown. Photo in the collection of the Smithsonian Archives of American Art.
c. 1912 53 years old	Visits Morocco in March–June 1912		Moonrise, Tangier	Ruth and Elmer Wellin Museum of Art, Hamilton College. Oil on plywood, 19½ x 23½ in. (49.5 x 59.7 cm)		
c. 1910 50 years old	Visits Morocco in March–June 1912		Street Scene, Tangier (Crenelated Architecture)	Smithsonian American Art Museum, 1983.95.196B. Oil on paperboard, 10 5/8 x 13 3/4 in. (27.0 x 34.9 cm.)		
c. 1912 53 years old	Visits Morocco in March–June 1912		Near East Scene or Mosque in Tangier	Des Moines Art Center. Oil and casein on canvas, 28 3/4 X 23 '/2" (73.03 x 59.69 cm).		
c. 1912 53 years old	Visits Morocco in March–June 1912		Moroccan Man	Private collection. Oil on panel, 13 x 9 1/4 in.		
Undated.	Tanner traveled to Morocco, in March–June 1912, to Algiers in 1908.	Image with horseshoe arch or keyhole arch. Light from low sun; light bounces from building-top to make line of light on ground; building-reflected light casts man's shadow.	untitled	Private collection. Oil on wood panel, 6 x 9 in.		
c. 1912-1914 53–55 years old	Visits Morocco in March–June 1912		Sunlight, Tangier	Milwaukee Art Museum. Oil on cardboard panel, 10 3/4 X 13 3/4" (27.31 x 34.93 cm).		
c. 1912 53 years old	Visits Morocco in March — June 1912	Paints the entrance to the Casbah or the historic city area and fortress many times.	Gateway, Tangier	St. Louis Museum of Art, 33:2005. Oil on canvas, 18 7/16 × 15 5/16 in. (46.8 × 38.9 cm).		Another version, Gate to the Casbah, 1914, private collection, oil on canvas, 30 x 26" (76.2 x 66.04 cm)
c. 1912 53 years old	Visits Morocco in March — June 1912	"[Tanner] made numerous small oil sketches that he brought back to his studio in France, where he developed them into larger paintings on canvas..."	Doorway in Tangier	Philadelphia Museum of Art, 2004–117–1. Oil on canvas 14 × 10 3/4 inches (35.6 × 27.3 cm)	Doorway in Tangier, by Henry Ossawa Tanner, collection of Philadelphia Art Museum	
c. 1910 or c. 1912 51 or 53 years old	Visits Morocco in March — June 1912	Entrance to the Casbah	Gateway, Tangier	Smithsonian American Art Museum, 1983.95.190. oil on plywood, 22 1/2 x 19 in. (57.2 x 48.3 cm.)		
c. 1912 53 years old	Visits Morocco in March — June 1912		Street Scene, Tangier or Man Leading a Donkey in Front of the Palaise de Justice, Tangier or Man Leading a Calf	Smithsonian American Art Museum, 1983.95.196A. Oil on paperboard, 10 5/8 x 13 3/4 in. (27.0 x 34.9 cm.)		
c. 1910 51 years old	Visits Morocco		Street in Tangier	Smithsonian American Art Museum, 1983.95.209. Oil on fiberboard, 13 5/8 x 10 1/2 in. (34.5 x 26.7 cm)		
c. 1912 53 years old	Spends time in Morocco, in the city of Tangiers in March–June.		Street Scene, Tangiers	Museum of Fine Arts, Boston, 2011.1840. Oil on panel, 19 1/4 x 23 1/2 in. (48.9 x 59.7 cm).		Moroccan Scene, c. 1912. Birmingham Museum of Art, 1971.30. Oil on canvas, 18 1/4 x 15 1/4 in. (46.4 x 38.7 cm).
1912 53 years old	Spends time in Morocco, in the city of Tangiers in March–June.		Entrance to the Casbah	Art Museum of Greater Lafayette. Oil on paper mounted on canvas,32 x 26 in. (81.2 cm x 67.3 cm.)		
c. 1912 53 years old	Spends time in Morocco, in the city of Tangiers in March–June 1912.		Midday, Tangiers	Cummer Museum. Oil on canvas, 24 ⅛ x 20 in.		
c. 1912 53 years old	Spends time in Morocco, in the city of Tangiers in March–June 1912.	Woman in traditional clothing, carrying water pitcher, in front of entrance to Casbah, Tangiers.	Untitled.	Private collection. Gouache on paper, H 13 1/2" W 10 1/2"		
c. 1913-1914 54 years old	Spends time in Morocco, in the city of Tangiers in March–June 1912.		Moonlight: Walls of Tangiers	Los Angeles County Museum of Art (LACMA), 48.32.46. Oil on canvas 25 7/8 x 21 1/4 in. (65.72 x 54.1 cm)		
undated Possibly c. 1913 54 years old		Attributed to Tanner online.	untitled, Muslim man with horse. Possibly the work exhibited in 1913 under the title The Sultan's Stables.	Private collection.	untitled, Muslim man with horse, by Henry Ossawa Tanner	
c. 1913-1914 54–55 years old		Tanner painted the Miraculous catch of fish, in which Jesus tells the disciples to try one more cast of the net, at which they are rewarded with a great catch.	The Miraculous Haul of Fishes	National Academy of Design. Oil on canvas, 38 × 47 1/2 in.		
c. 1913 54 years old			Fishermen at Sea	Given by Jesse O. Tanner (Henry's son) to Smithsonian American Art Museum, 1983.95.215. Oil on canvas, 46 x 35 1/4 in. (116.9 cm x 89.5 cm.)		
c. 1913 54 years old			Landscape in Moonlight	Hampton University Museum.		
c. 1914 55 years old	1914 was the year his mother died, World War I broke out, and it wasn't safe for his family in France. They left for England.	Mary was one of two Salon entries for 1914, along with Christ in the Home of Lazarus.	Mary	Smithsonian American Art Museum, 1991.102. Oil on canvas, 45 1/2 x 34 3/4 in. (115.5 x 88.2 cm.)		
c. 1914 55 years old	"Probably made just before the war..."World War I	Tanner began using a "new pallet of colors and a freer technique." In Impressionist tradition, a study of light on a still scene.	Landscape	Sheldon Ross Gallery, Birmingham, Michigan. Oil on artist's board, 10 x 13" (25.4 x 33.2 cm.)	Landscape, 1914, by Henry Ossawa Tanner	
1914 55 years old			Moonlight Path	Private collection. Oil on board, 6 1/4 by 6 3/4 in (16 by 17.2 cm.)		
1910-1914 51–54 years old	About 1910 Tanner takes photo study of wife Jessie and son Jesse	by about 1914 has made paintings from photo study	Christ Learning to Read	Des Moines Art Center. Oil on canvas, 52 x 41” (132.08 x 104.14 cm)		Jessie and Jesse Tanner as Mary and Jesus, about 1910.
1914 55 years old	World War I breaks out. Henry takes his wife Jessie and son Jesse to England to escape the violence. They enroll Jesse in school there.	Portrait of Jesse Tanner, son of Henry Ossawa Tanner and Jessie M. Tanner. Dated March 1914, bottom left corner.	Portrait of Jesse Tanner	Private collection. Oil on canvas, 46 x 38 cm.		
c. 1914 55 years old	World War I broke out. Tanner's mother died in August 1914. He had difficulty painting.	"Tanner painted very few works between late 1914 and the latter part of 1918" This is one of very few paintings made in the "early years of the war."	War Scene, Etaples, France, a study	Clark Atlanta University Collection of Afro-American Art. Oil on cardboard, 143/4 x 18"(37.47 x 45.72 cm)		
c. 1916-1922 57–63 years old		After Tanner took a second trip to the Holy Land in 1898-99 he began using a recurring theme of Joseph and Mary fleeing for Egypt. Tanner might have thought of Christian metaphor for the painting: even in darkness, the path [to God] is visible.	Flight Into Egypt	Smithsonian American Art Museum, 1983.95.202. Oil on wood, 16 7/8 x 16 7/8 in. (43.0 x 43.0 cm)		
c. 1917 58 years old		One of several paintings titled The Good Shepherd, "based generally on the Gospel of John (10:14—16)" and the 23rd Psalm. "I am the good shepherd, and know my sheep, and am known of mine. As the Father knoweth me, even so know I the Father: and I lay down my life for the sheep. And other sheep I have, which are not of this fold: them also I must bring, and they shall hear my voice; and there shall be one fold, and one shepherd." — Gospel of John (10:14—16) "The Lord is my Shepherd; I shall not want." — 23rd Psalm	The Good Shepherd	New Orleans Museum of Art, 30.3. Oil on canvas, 29/4 X 33 1/4" (74.3 x 84.46 cm)		
date unknown, before 1931		One of the four paintings photographed by the Harmon Foundation, exhibited by them in 1931.	The Good Shepherd			
1916 or c. 1910-1920 57 years old			Fisherman's Devotions, Étaples	Private collection. Oil on panel, height: 33 cm (12.9 in); width: 22.9 cm (9 in).		
c. 1916 57 years old		One of the four paintings photographed by the Harmon Foundation, exhibited by them in 1931.	Flight Into Egypt	Smithsonian National Museum of African American History and Culture, 2015.2.3. Oil on wood panel, H x W: 16 5/8 × 22 in. (42.2 × 55.9 cm).		
1917 58 years old			The Good Shepherd	Crystal Bridges Museum of American Art, 2019.5. Oil on canvas, height: 64.8 cm (25.5 in) Edit this at Wikidata; width: 81.3 cm (32 in)		
1917 58 years old		The Study for Shepherd With Herd was estimated as made in 1917. The final painting is undated.	Study for Shepherd With Herd or The Good Shepherd	Private collection. Oil on wood panel, circa 1917. 210x273 mm; 8 1/4x10 3/4 inches.	Study for Shepherd with herd	Shepherd with Herd
undated			Landscape	North Carolina Museum of Art, G.77.4.1. Oil on cardboard, 13 5/16 x 10 1/8 in. (33.8 x 25.7 cm)		
1917 58 years old	probably from photo and personal memory, painted after death	Portrait commissioned by the Iowa Federation of Colored Women's Clubs, through J. S. Carpenter.	Portrait of Booker T. Washington	State Historical Society of Iowa. Oil on canvas, 313/4 X 25 5/8” (80.65 x 65.09 cm).		
c. 1917-1918 57–58 years old			Study of an American Soldier	Telfair Museums, 1979.20.4. Hard charcoal and lead pencil on paper, 16 7/8 × 13 5/8 inches (42.9 × 34.6 cm)		
1918 59 years old	Tanner served with the Red Cross during part of World War I.	Domremy, birthplace of Joan of Arc. Soldiers visible, identifiable by their helmets.	House of Joan of Arc or Domrémy	Private collection. Oil on wood panel, height: 20 x 24 in. (50.8 x 60.9 cm.)		Birthplace of Joan of Arc at Domremy-la-Puccelle, 1918. Huntington Museum of Art. Oil on wood, 9 1/4 x 13 in.
1918 59 years old	Tanner served with the Red Cross during part of World War I.		"American Red Cross Canteen, Toul, France, World War I"	American Red Cross, Washington D.C. Oil on canvas, 143/16 X 16 5/16" (36.04 x 41.43 cm).		A.R.C. Canteen, World War I, 1918. Smithsonian American Art Museum, 1983.95.36. Charcoal on paper mounted on paperboard, sheet: 17 1/2 x 22 in. (44.4 x 55.9 cm).
1918 59 years old	Tanner served with the Red Cross during part of World War I.		"American Red Cross Canteen at the Front"	American Red Cross, Washington D.C. Oil on canvas, 48 X 61”.		American Red Cross Canteen, by Henry Ossawa Tanner
1918 59 years old	Tanner served with the Red Cross during part of World War I.		"Intersection of Roads at Neufchateau, World War I"	American Red Cross, Washington D.C. Oil on canvas, 25 5/8 X 31 7/8" (65.09 x 80.96 cm).		
1918 58 years old	Tanner painted this at about the time he did the Red Cross paintings.		Neufchateau or Old House, Neufchateau, Vosges	Private collection. Displayed by Museum of Fine Arts, Houston, EX.2008.HC.010. Oil on canvas, 28 x 32 in.		Study for Neufchateau. Has also been called "Street Scene in Tangier #135, ca. 1910".
c. 1918 59 years old			Étaples and the Canche River at Dusk or untitled (Dusk Scene of a Flooded River and Nearby Town)	Hood Museum of Art, Dartmouth. Oil on paperboard, 10 3/4 × 13 7/8 in. (27.3 × 35.2 cm) formerly Michael Rosenfeld Gallery		
c. 1918 59 years old			The good shepherd	National Gallery of Art, 2014.136.159. Oil on canvas on particle board, 60.33 × 48.26 cm (23 3/4 × 19 in.) Formerly in the Evans-Tibbs collection.	The good shepherd, 1918, by Henry Ossawa Tanner	
1919 60 years old	Tanner's son Jesse was about 16 years old in 1919.		Portrait of Jesse Ossawa Tanner	Private collection. Charcoal on paper, 48 x 30 cm - 18.8 x 11.8 in.	Portrait of Jesse Ossawa Tanner, son of the artist, by Henry Ossawa Tanner	
undated possibly c. 1917-1920	Tanner's son Jesse was about 16 years old in 1919.		Portrait of Jesse Tanner in profile, the artist's son	Private collection. Oil on paper, 9 3/8 x 11 in.		
1919 60 years old	World War I ended November 11, 1918.	The painting has a date which looks like July 13, 1914. However, it is for the "Celebration of the Dead, held on July 13, 1919, in Paris to honor those who died defending France during World War I." With the war over, Tanner could return to his chosen work.	The Arch or The Arch of Triumph	Brooklyn Museum, 32.10. Oil on canvas, 39 1/4 x 38 3/16 in. (99.7 x 97 cm)		
undated per museum 1919 per note 60 years old	Tanner wrote a note in painting's crossbar, executing work in 1917, retouching and completing it in July 1919.	Multiple versions. Original dates back to 1900 titled "Night," (lost) owned by Atherton Curtis. A second version owned by Robert C. Ogden Return of the Fisherman was made in 1905. This third version dates to about 1919. A fourth version Fisherman's return was made about 1926. A fifth version, Fishermen returning at night was painted about 1930.	The Fisherman's Return	Smithsonian American Art Museum, 1983.95.212. Oil on canvas, 25 1/2 x 19 1/4 in. (64.8 x 49.0 cm.)	Fisherman's Return, Smithsonian American Art Museum (SAAM-1983.95.212), undated.	
c. 1920s		Landscape of the countryside near Nice, France	Countryside Around Nice, France	Private collection. Oil on plywood, 165x189 mm; 6 1/2x7 3/4 inches		Country Road in France, undated. Smithsonian American Art Museum, 1983.95.206. Oil on canvas mounted on wood,8 1/2 x 11 5/8 in. (21.6 x 29.5cm.)
Undated		Stamped in the lower right corner with the contact information of Henry's son Jesse. Likely French countryside as Tanner had painted other French countryside scenes in this manner.	untitled	Smithsonian American Art Museum, 1983.95.188B. Oil on wood panel, 9 1/2 x 13 in. (24.0 x 33.0 cm.)		
c. 1920-1924 61–65 years old		Fleeing Sodom and Gomorrha; the woman who looks back (Lot's wife) turns into a pillar of salt.	Sodom and Gomorrha	Formerly in the Michael Rosenfeld Gallery, New York City. Oil on canvas, 41 1/2 x 36 1/2 in. (104.4 x 92 cm.)		The Destruction of Sodom and Gomorrah. Private collection. Gouache on Paper, approximately 14.5 x 18.5 inches.
Undated.		One of the four paintings photographed by the Harmon Foundation, exhibited by them in 1931.	Sodom and Gomorrah	Private collection.		
1920s		Tanner painted Jesus' appearance his dispicles on the Road to Emmaus. The disciples met Christ on the road and invited him to eat with them. Tanner painted a moment before the disciples recognized him.	Invitation to Christ to Enter by his Disciples at Emmaus	Private collection. Oil on canvas, 19 ½ x 23 1/8 in. (49.5 x 58.7 cm.)		
1920-1925 61–66 years old		Recurring theme of Joseph and Mary fleeing for Egypt (started theme about 1899).	Flight Into Egypt	Private collection. Was held by Michael Rose Fine Art; oil on linen canvas, circa 1920-25 23 1/4 x 37 inches, 590 x 952 mm.		
1921 62 years old		After Tanner took a second trip to the Holy Land in 1898-99 he began using a recurring theme of Joseph and Mary fleeing for Egypt	Flight Into Egypt	Museum of Fine Arts Houston, 50.10. Oil on panel, 20 × 24 in. (50.8 × 61.0 cm)		
1921 62 years old		At least 2 versions were made around the theme of Moses' mother hiding him in the bullrushes. The first made galleries from 1908 to 1911, the latter from 1922 to 1924.	Moses in the Bullrushes or The Hiding of Moses	Smithsonian American Art Museum, 1983.95.197. Oil on wood panel, 22 3/8 x 15 1/8 in. (56.8 x 38.5 cm)		Moses in the Bullrushes (Moise Dans Les Joncs), 1921. Private collection, oil on panel, 20 x 15 ¾ in (50.8 x 40 cm.)
1922 63 years old		The version at the Newark museum shows a shepard caring for his lost sheep, "a theme based on Matthew's account (18:12—14)." "How think ye? if a man have an hundred sheep, and one of them be gone astray, doth he not leave the ninety and nine, and goeth into the mountains, and seeketh that which is gone astray? And if so be that he find it, verily I say unto you, he rejoiceth more of that sheep, than of the ninety and nine which went not astray. Even so it is not the will of your Father which is in heaven, that one of these little ones should perish. —Matthew (18:12—14)	The Good Shepherd or The Lost Sheep	The Newark Museum. Oil on canvas, 32 x 24” (81.28 x 60.96 cm)		Shepherd and Flock. Undated, sold at auction.
c. 1922 63 years old			Virgin and Child	Wadsworth Atheneum Museum of Art, Hartford. Oil on canvas 32 x 25" (81.28 x 63.5 cm)	Virgin and Child, by Henry Ossawa Tanner	
undated	Tanner took a second trip to the Holy Land, in 1898–99. Began recurring theme of Joseph and Mary fleeing for Egypt.	Recurring theme of Joseph and Mary fleeing for Egypt. Study dated 1916–1922.	Flight into Egypt	Oil on artist board, 17 1/2 x 20 1/2	Flight into Egypt, by Henry Ossawa Tanner	Flight into Egypt, c. 1916-1922. Private collection. Oil on woodpanel, 28 x 22.2 cm. (11 x 8.7 in.)
1923 64 years old		Recurring theme of Joseph and Mary fleeing for Egypt. Here, Mary (carrying Jesus) and Joseph quietly follow the guard (carrying the light).	Flight Into Egypt or The Futile Guard	Metropolitan Museum of Art, 2001.402a. Oil on canvas, 29 x 26 in. (73.7 x 66 cm)		Flight Into Egypt (study), 1923. Private collection. Oil on cardstock, 13 x 9 1/2 inches
1923 64 years old			The Sleeping Disciples or Christ in the Garden of Gethsemane	Private collection. Oil on canvas, 28 x 23" (71.12 x 58.42)		
1923 64 years old	Tanner receives the Walter Leighton Clark prize for this painting in 1930.	Painting has 1923 date in lower right corner. Formerly owned by J. J. Haverty.	Etaples Fisher Folk	High Museum of Art, 36.16. Tempera and oil on canvas, 47 5/16 x 38 5/16 inches.		
1923 64 years old		Tanner began reinterpreting the story of Jesus and Nicodemus, which he painted in 1899. This is a study for Nicodemus Visiting Jesus (1927)	Christ and Nicodemus (early study)	Private collection. Oil on thick cardstock, circa 1923. 267x345 mm; 10 1/2x13 5/8 inches.		
1927 68 years old	Commissioned 1924, finished 1927.	Tanner began reinterpreting the story of Jesus and Nicodemus, which he painted in 1899. The latter is Nicodemus Visiting Jesus (1927)	Nicodemus Visiting Jesus or Nicodemus Coming to Christ or Nicodemus Before Christ	Private collection. Oil on canvas laid down on board, 61 1/4 x 71 in. (155.6 x 180.3 mm)		Study for Christ and Nicodemus, c. 1923. Smithsonian American Art Museum, 1983.95.188A. Oil on wood panel, 9 1/2 x 13 in.
1924 65 years old		(John 20:4—6): John kneels at Jesus' tomb, Peter in the background. Tanner painted this over the circa 1899 painting Judas. Displayed October 1925 at 24th Carnegie Institute International Exhibition. This work was painted over the top of the 1899 painting Judas.	Two disciples at the tomb	Michael Rosenfeld Gallery. Oil on board 51 1/2 X 43 1/4" (130.81 x 109.86 cm)		Study for Disciple Kneeling at the Tomb, undated. Smithsonian American Art Museum, 1983.95.32. Charcoal and vine charcoal on paper, 13 1/2 x 9 3/4 in. (34.4 x 24.8 cm)
1925 66 years old		Three wise men on their camels, traveling to see Jesus at Christmas.	The Three Wise Men	Private collection. Oil on canvas, 25 x 35 in. (63.5 X 88.9 cm)		
1926-1927 67–68 years old	Tanner took a second trip to the Holy Land, in 1898–99. Began recurring theme of Joseph and Mary fleeing for Egypt.	Bought originally by James Joseph Haverty, along with The Road to Emmaus	At the Gates or Flight Into Egypt. See: 1899 version.	Oil on panel, circa 1926–27. 610x483 mm; 24x19 inches		
undated	Recurring theme of Joseph and Mary fleeing for Egypt (began about 1899).		Departure Into Egypt or At the Inn	Smithsonian American Art Museum. Oil on wood, 21 3/8 x 18 1/4 in. (54.4 x 46.4 cm)		
1926 67 years old		Multiple versions. Original dates back to 1900 titled "Night," (lost) owned by Atherton Curtis. A second version owned by Robert C. Ogden Return of the Fisherman was made in 1905. A third version The Fishermen's Return was painted about 1919. This fourth version was made about 1926. A fifth version, Fishermen returning at night was painted about 1930.	Fishermen's Return	Harmon and Harriet Kelley Foundation for the Arts. Oil on canvas, 25 3/16 x 19 5/8 in.	Fishermen's Return, by Henry Ossawa Tanner	Fishermen Returning at Night, c. 1930. Merton Simpson collection, oil and tempera on academy board, 9 3/8 x 7 1/2 inches.
c. 1927 68 years old	Exhibited Art Institute of Chicago, 1927.		The Poor Ye Have With You Always	Private collection. Oil on canvas.		
c. 1928/1936			untitled (Moonlight Landscape)	DuSable Museum of African American History, Chicago.	untitled (Moonlight Landscape), undated	
1929-1930 70–71 years old	The two cities of Sodom and Gomorrah are engulfed in God's wrath. "The painting's abstraction and simplicity of form evoke a sense of interaction between the physical and spiritual worlds." In this version, Lot and his daughters are nearly invisible, at the lower right.	Formerly owned by J. J. Haverty.	Destruction of Sodom and Gomorrah	High Museum of Art, 49.32. Tempera and varnish on cardboard, 20 3/8 x 36 in.		
c. 1930 71 years old			Hand of Henry O. Tanner	Smithsonian American Art Museum, 1983.95.35. Conte crayon on paper, 10 5/8 x 14 in. (27.0 x 35.5 cm)		Study of Two Hands, undated. Smithsonian American Art Museum, 1983.95.45. Charcoal on paper, charcoal on paper, sheet: 7 x 11 3/4 in. (17.9 x 30.0 cm).
c. 1930 71 years old			The Lost Sheep or The Good Shepherd	Menil Collection, Houston. Oil and tempera on paperboard. 10 5/8 x 8 1/8" (26.99 x 20.64 cm)		
1930 71 years old		Tanner painted the theme of The Good Shepherd more than 15 times.	The Good Shephard	Private collection. Tempera and oil glazes on canvas, 91,4 x 76,2 cm (36 x 30 in)		
undated			Countryside Landscape or Paysage de Campagne	Private collection.	Countryside Landscape, by Henry Ossawa Tanner	
undated		Landscape of a Middle-Eastern/North African city, with domes and minarets. Could date from 1897 to 1912 if from the period he visited Middle East, or later if painting from memory.	Distant View of a City	Private collection. Oil on canvas laid on masonite, 21 x 16 1/2 in (53.3 x 41.9 cm)	Distant view of a city, by Henry Ossawa Tanner	
c. 1930 or c. 1936 71 or 77 years old		Tanner painted the theme of The Good Shepherd more than 15 times. He painted this at Etaples, Paris, 43 Rue de Fleurus, 6.	The Good Shephard (Atlas Mountains, Morocco)	Smithsonian American Art Museum, 1983.95.198. Oil on canvas (or fiberboard), 29 7/8 x 36 in. (75.8 x 91.3 cm)		The Good Shepherd in the Atlas Mountains or The Good Shepherd, c. 1936. Private collection, Oil and tempera on board, 9 1/4 x 13 in. (23.5 x 33.02 cm.)
c. 1930 71 years old			He Healed the Sick	Smithsonian American Art Museum, 1983.95.199. Oil on panel, 16 1/4 x 21 1/2 in. (41.3 x 54.5 cm).		Disciples Healing the Sick, c. 1930. Clark Atlanta University Art Galleries.Height: 91.44 cm (36 in.), Width: 121.92 cm (48 in.)
c. 1930 71 years old			He Healed the Sick	Private collection. Oil on board 9 1/4 by 13 inches (23.5 by 33 cm)	He Healed the Sick, number 11, by Henry Ossawa Tanner	Study for Disciples Healing the Sick, c. 1930. Private collection. Oil on thin plywood panel, 10 1/2x13 3/4 in.
c. 1930 71 years old		Landscape of French countryside	Haystacks	Smithsonian American Art Museum, 1983.95.214. Oil on canvas, 26 1/4 x 21 in. (66.7 x 53.3 cm.)		
undated		Landscape of trees bending in the wind. French name at gallery, probably painted in France.	Arbres Sous Le Vent	Bill Hodges Gallery. Oil on Panel 10 ⅜ x 13 ¾ in. (26.35 x 34.9 cm)		
by 1935		Tanner painted the theme of Flight into Egypt more than 15 times.	Flight into Egypt	Private collection. Oil on panel, 24 x 28 in. (60.96 x 71.12 cm.)	Flight into Egypt, 1935, by Henry Ossawa Tanner	
c. 1930s(?)			Study for Mary, Return from the Crucifixion	Private collection.		
c. 1934-1935 75–76 years old		Mary and Joseph, after Jesus is crucified.	Return from the Cross	Colby College Museum of Art. Oil and tempura on board, 39 7/8 x 29 7/8 in. (101.3 x 75.9 cm)		Study for Return from Crucifixion, signed 1933. Smithsonian American Art Museum, 1983.95.37. Pencil and conté crayon on paper mounted on paperboard, 15 1/8 x 14 1/8 in.
1936 77 years old		Mary and Joseph, fleeing with Jesus for Egypt	Flight into Egypt	Howard University, 50.5.P. Oil on board, 19 × 23 1/2 in. (48.3 × 59.7 cm)		
1936 77 years old	Tanner's final completed and signed painting. He passes away on 25 May 1936.	Mary and Joseph in foreground, after Jesus is crucified.	Return from the Crucifixion	Howard University Gallery of Art. Oil and tempura on plywood, 20 x 23 1/2 in.		
