= Woman from the West Indies =

1891 painting by Henry Ossawa Tanner

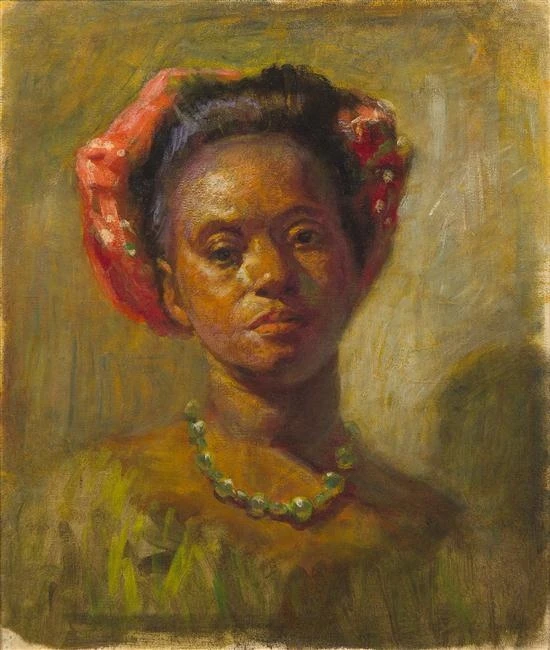
- Woman from the West Indies, by Henry Ossawa Tanner.
- Artist: Henry Ossawa Tanner
- Year: c. 1891
- Medium: oil on canvas mounted on board
- Dimensions: (18 inches in × 15 inches in)

Woman From the West Indies is a painting by Henry Ossawa Tanner painted about 1891 in Brittany, France, during his first or second summer in France. The portrait is unsigned but is attributed to Tanner based on the way it was painted, compared to Tanner's known works from 1891-1893. Those examining the painting looked for patterns in the way the artist used color, the brush strokes, and the stylistic choices in how light itself is shown in the painting.

This work may have influenced Julius Bloch in making his painting, The Man with the Blue Sweater.

== Representing light ==
Looking at stylistic representation of light in the painting revealed a similarity to The Banjo Lesson. In that work, Tanner had painted to show the effects of two light sources, a window casting blue light and a fire casting warm colors. In Woman From the West Indies, the artist also chose multiple light sources. Dewey F. Mosby (Note: Director Emeritus of the Picker Art Gallery at Colgate University) points out a light from the left, lighting the side of the woman's face. He pointed to a lit background behind her on the right "which helps to animate the entire composition and add life to the sultry head of the mulatto model." He also points to light falling upon her necklace and her bonnet from the lower left.

== Circumstances ==
The picture is not of one of Tanner's family. Rather the woman was likely from one of the French Caribbean colonies, such as "French West Indies-Martinique, Guadeloupe or Dominica."

Tanner never traveled to the West Indies. However, in the period this was painted, he was acquainted with Paul Gauguin, who had been to Martinique and painted images there in 1889. Tanner painted Woman From the West Indies in his "formative years" (1891–1893); when he was an art student in France, learning his craft and influenced by the styles of others.

The painting was not signed as a finished work, possibly indicating its status as a study. The woman in the painting is not known; possibilities include other works, or people and pieces from other works. This could include the person (and French census records don't include race, so pinpointing a local girl is problematic) and clothing (from works by Agostino Brunias or Paul Gauguin).

== Other works ==
The painting is one of seven paintings of people of color that Tanner did, including The Banjo Lesson, The Thankful Poor, Portrait of the Artist's Mother, Mother of Henry O., Portrait of Sister Sarah and Bishop Benjamin Tucker Tanner.

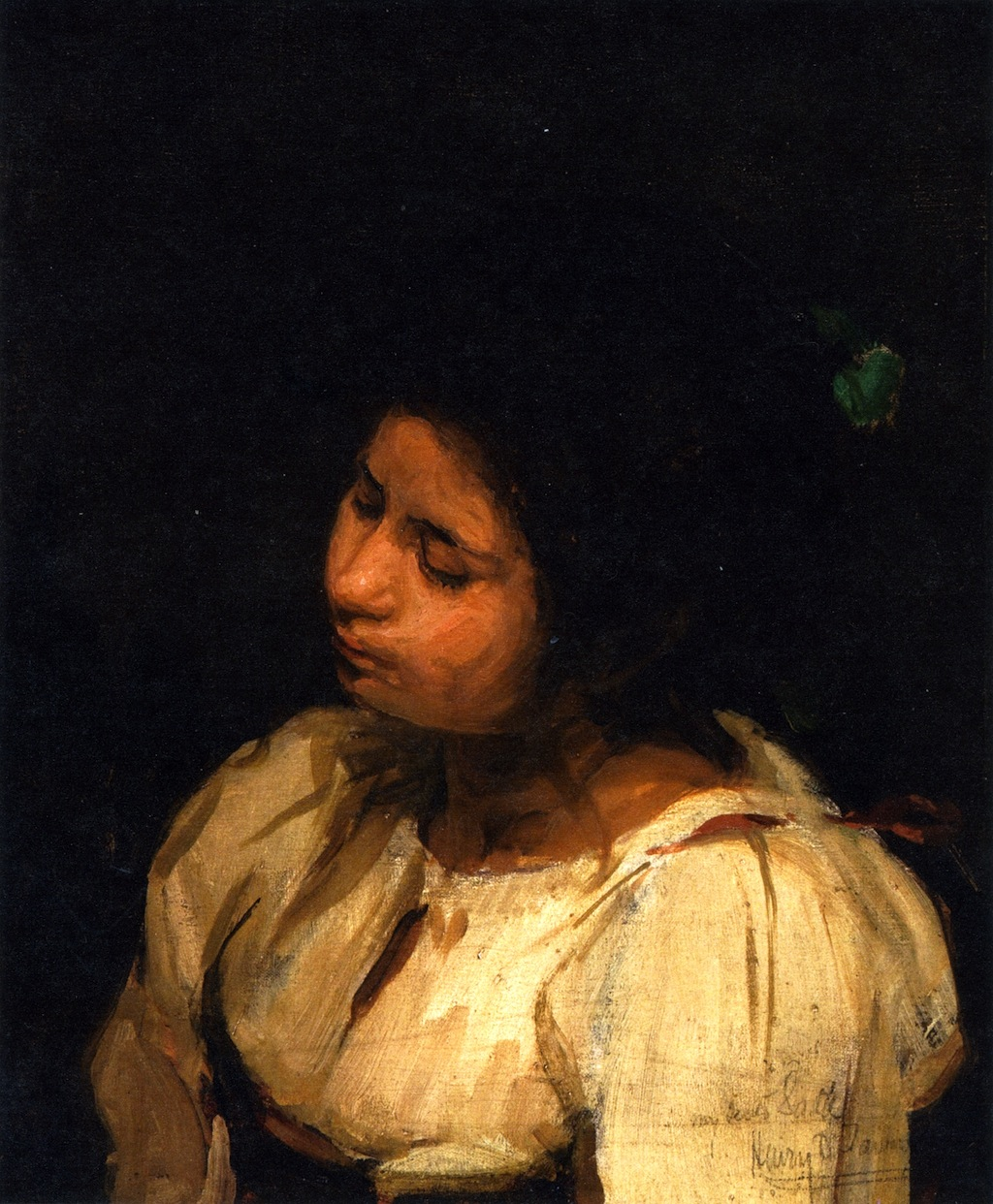
Sister Sarah, 1882.

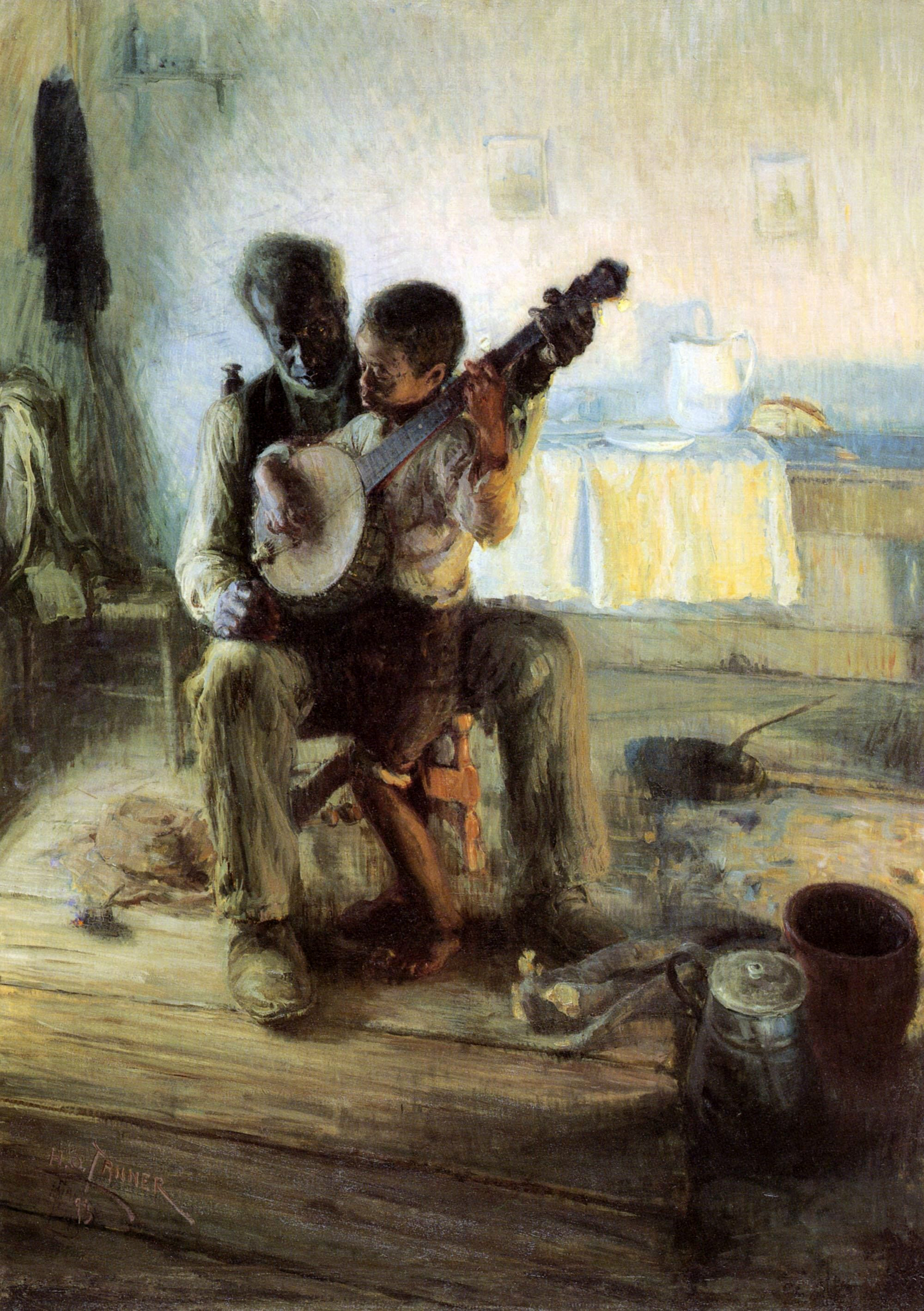
The Banjo Lesson, 1893

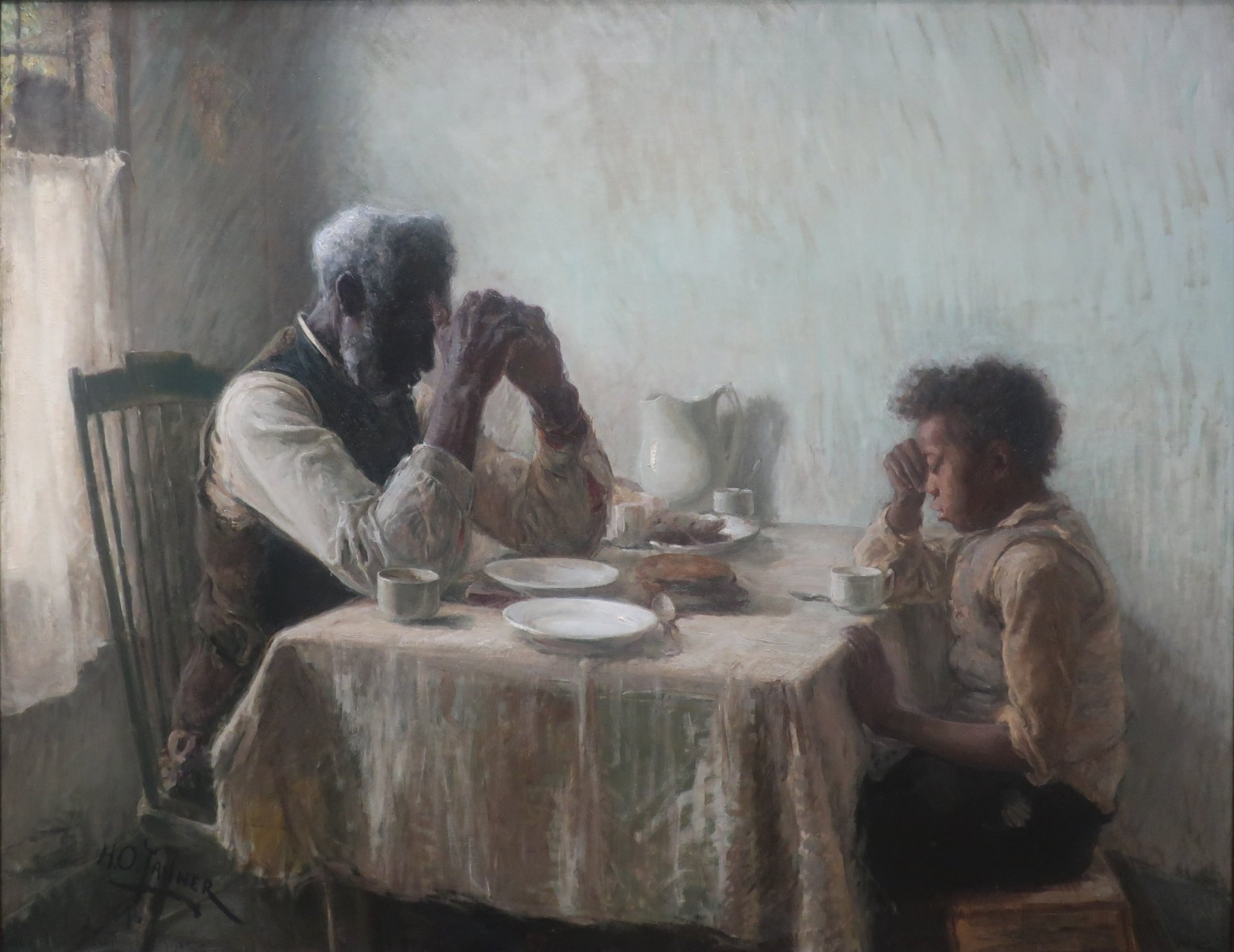
The Thankful Poor, 1894

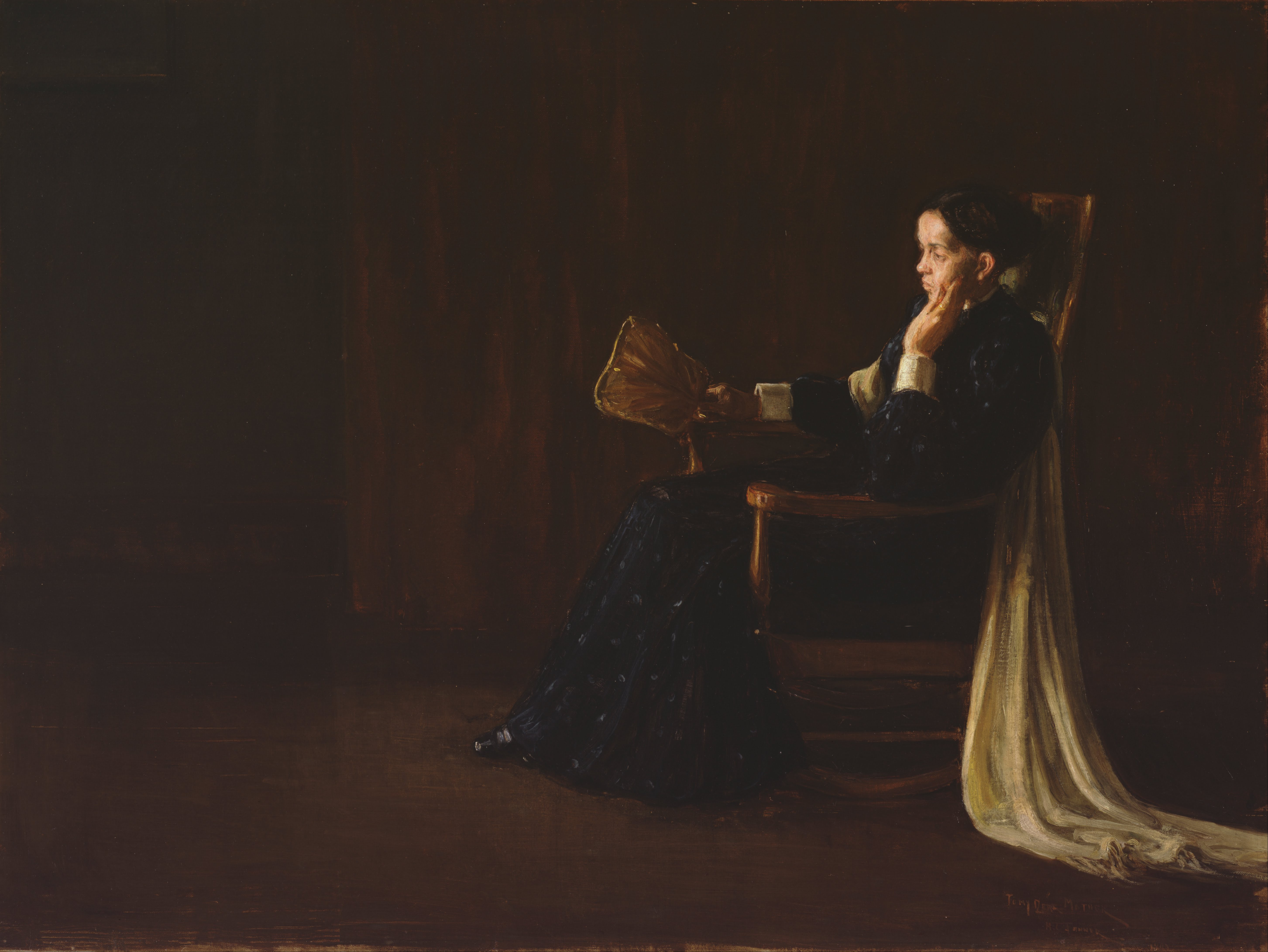
Portrait of the Artist's Mother, 1897.

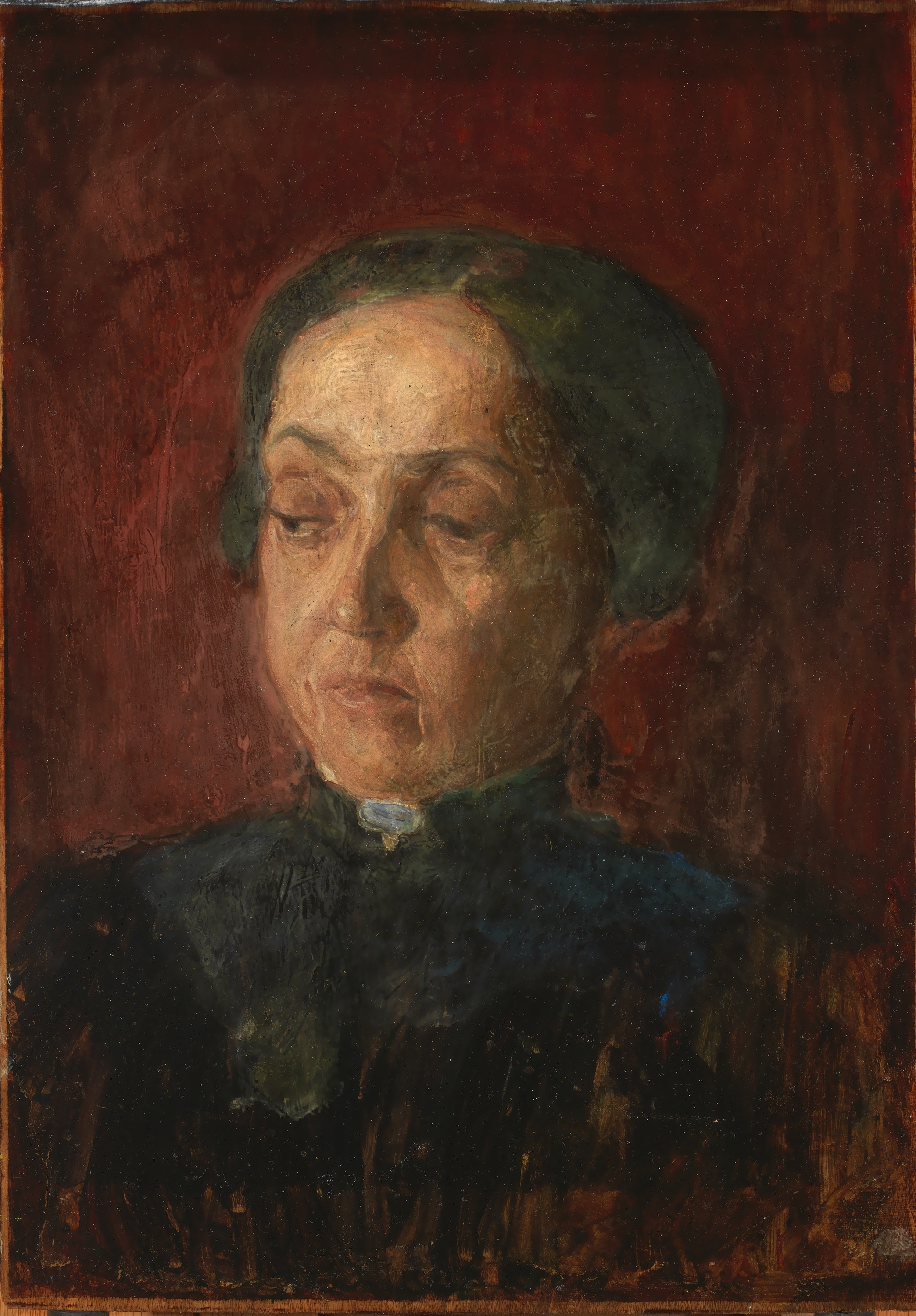
Mother of Henry O. Tanner, undated.

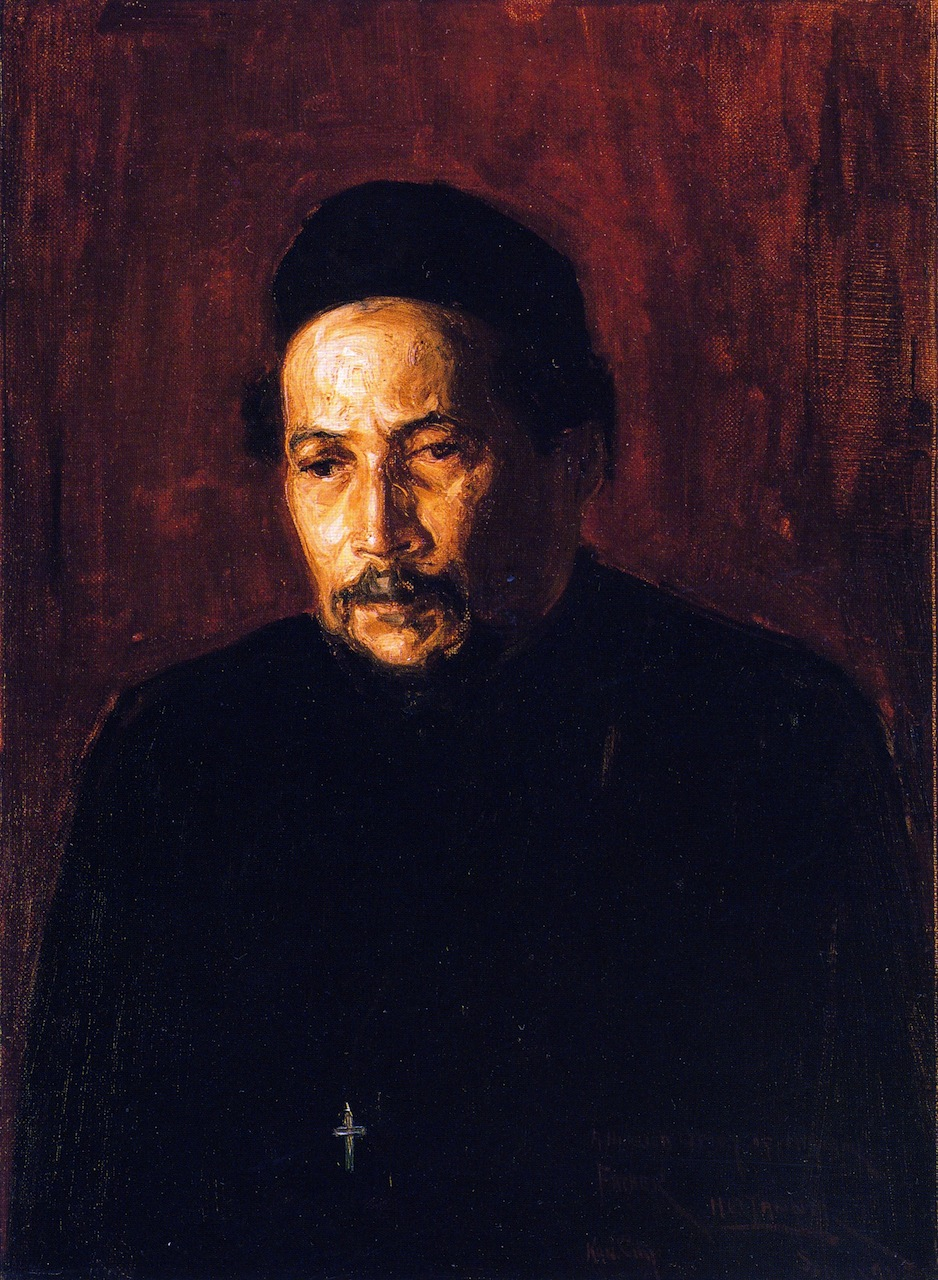
Bishop Benjamin Tucker Tanner, 1897.

== See also ==
- List of paintings by Henry Ossawa Tanner
