= Salome (Henry Ossawa Tanner) =

Painting by Henry Ossawa Tanner

Salomé
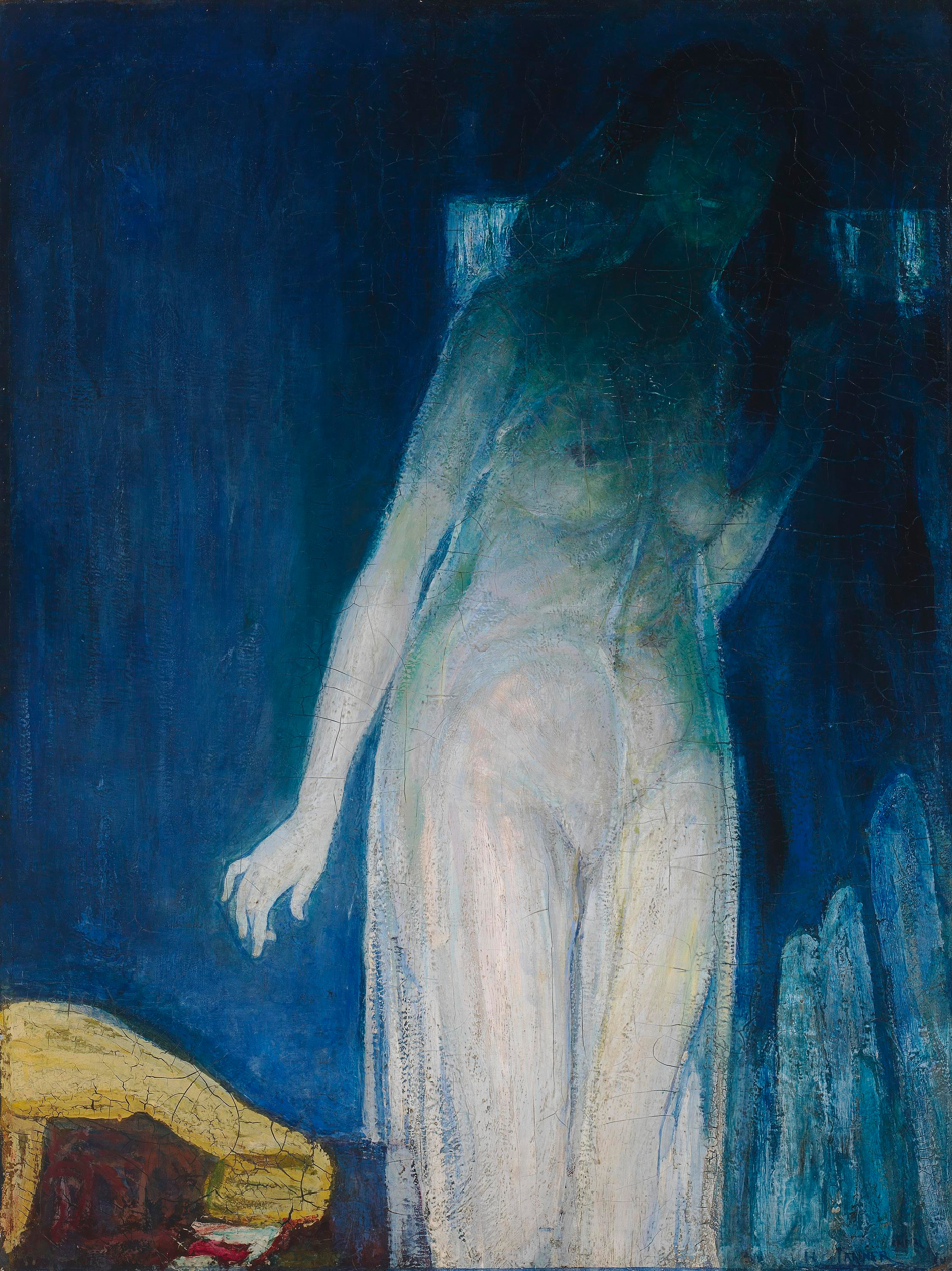
- The painting Salome by Henry Ossawa Tanner, completed between 1900 and 1903. The body of John the Baptist lies at her feet, in the bottom left of the painting.
- Artist: Henry Ossawa Tanner
- Year: c. 1903
- Medium: oil painting on board
- Movement: Christian art, Symbolist painting
- Subject: Salome
- Dimensions: 116.5 cm cm × 89.4 cm cm (45 7/8 in × 35 1/4 in)
- Location: Smithsonian American Art Museum, Washington, D.C.
- Accession: 1983.95.207A

Salomé is a painting by Henry Ossawa Tanner, showing the princess Salome from the Bible, who danced before her stepfather Herod Antipas, and who demanded the head of John the Baptist as a reward for her performance. Tanner painted Salome as part of his Christian-themed paintings.

The painting was unusual for Tanner, a "marked departure for the usually reserved artist". Although he did draw nudes as part of his studies, few of his professional paintings feature nudity. This particular painting is even rarer for being perceived as erotic. In this work the eroticism is offset by the bloody head of John the Baptist. Further, Salome is herself decapitated in this painting by shadow.

The work may have been influenced by the works of El Greco. Tanner and his wife Jessie spent several months in Granada in the beginning of 1903, where he had time to study El Greco's paintings. The result on some of his own paintings (including Salome) was his use of the "elongated figure style of El Greco". The painting was admitted into the 1921 Paris Salon. The painting was also displayed in 1924, as part of a solo exhibition put on by Tanner at Grand Central Art Galleries in New York City.

The painting was dontated to the Smithsonian's Museum of African Art by Henry's son Jessy O. Tanner in 1975.

== Symbolism ==
Farisa Khalid wrote of another Tanner painting, "Looking closely at the painting, we have to ask ourselves what was the artist thinking in choosing to paint this dramatic scene in blue." Applied to Salome, context indicates that here, in a scene in which Salomé performed an act of evil and killed a holy man, Tanner's blue may symbolize holy judgement, horror of the consequences of sin, and death.

Tanner imitated art movements, experimenting with his paintings. He would be known as a symbolist, as well as painter of religious art, impressionist and realist or genre painter. In Salomé he used the same colors as The Sin by Franz von Stuck, blue over nudity, face in shadow, red-brown (a head in Salomé) in a corner.

In other works, Tanner users warm colors to indicate holiness, such as Jesus face in Nicodemus and Jesus, Jesus' robes in The Resurrection of Lazarus, and Jesus and the disciples in The Disciples at Emaus. Here the holy colors permeate John the Baptist's head, with separation from the blues of sin and judgement.

== See also ==
- List of paintings by Henry Ossawa Tanner
