= Flight into Egypt (Henry O. Tanner painting, 1899) =

1899 painting by Henry Ossawa Tanner

Flight Into Egypt (1899)
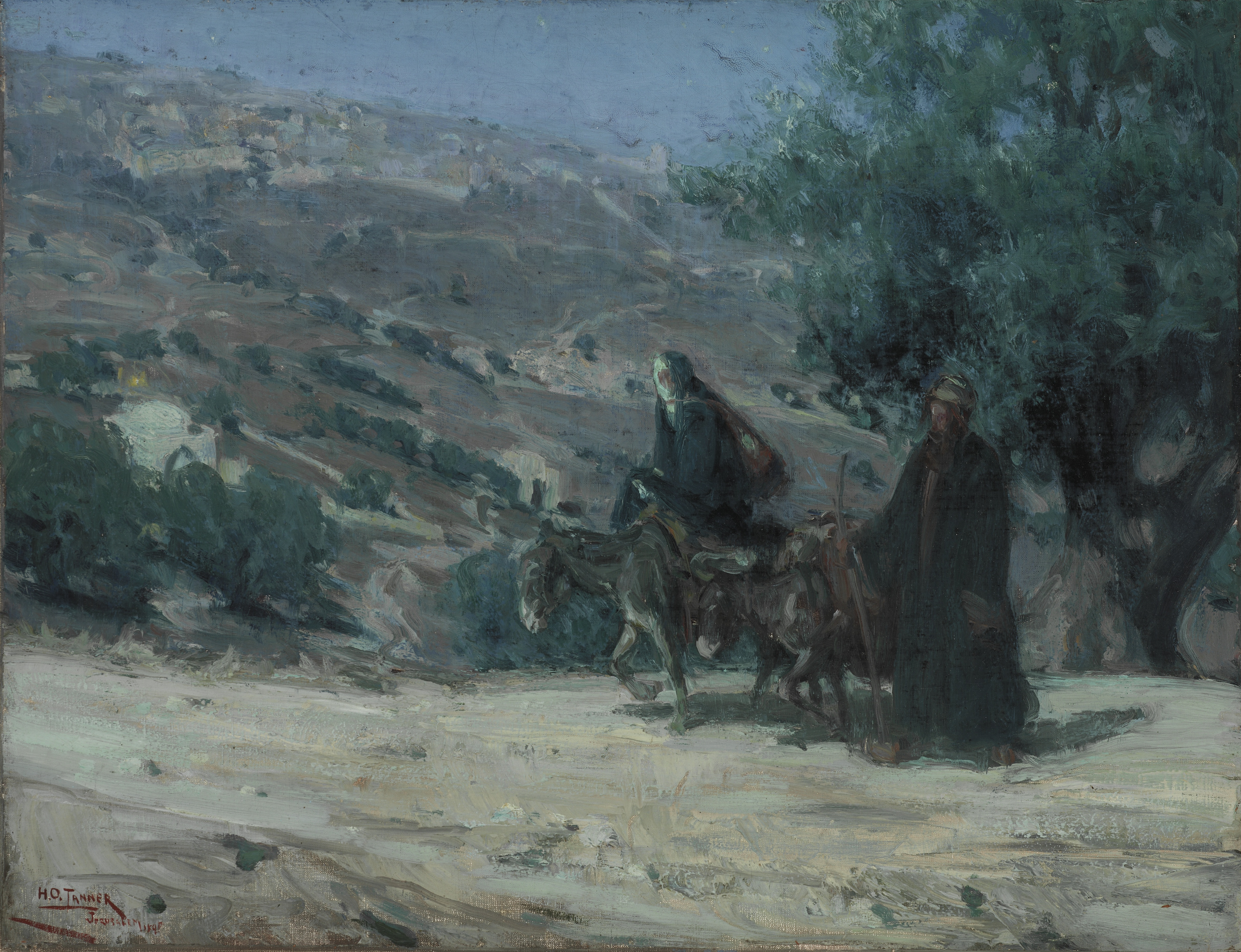
- Mary and Joseph flee for Egypt, Mary riding on a donkey, holding baby Jesus.
- Artist: Henry Ossawa Tanner
- Year: 1899
- Medium: Oil on canvas
- Movement: impressionism, symbolism
- Subject: Holy Family, Flight into Egypt
- Dimensions: 50.2 cm × 64.8 cm (19 3/4 in × 25 1/2 in)
- Location: Detroit Institute of Arts, Detroit
- Accession: 69.452

Flight into Egypt was a painting by Henry Ossawa Tanner, created in Paris about 1899 and displayed at the Carnegie Institute that year, along with Judas. The painting, a religious work, is an example of Tanner's symbolist paintings. The 1899 version was his first version of the painting.

The painting shows the Holy Family fleeing to Egypt, to save the life of Jesus. The painting's themes were important to Tanner, and he would paint the story as many as 15 times across his lifetime. Tanner's background was in the African Methodist Episcopal (A.M.E.), his father Benjamin Tucker Tanner a bishop in the church who wanted his son to follow into the ministry. When Tanner persistently chose to paint, his father wanted him to pursue religious themes, to use his paintings as his ministerial voice. Those religious interests included standing up for African Americans, who were living under prejudice.

Tanner painted Flight into Egypt in such a way as to give it universal appeal. Thematically it stood up for the oppressed, through its theme of good people fleeing persecution. Further, its characters, were rendered indistinctly in the twilight, enough that it was difficult to pin them down as being from a particular race or ethnic group; people could imagine their own in the painting.

== Symbolist painting ==
See: Precursors and origins of Symbolism and Symbolist painting

Tanner painted in Paris during the time when symbolism was becoming widespread. The movement in literature arose in the 1860s and at the end of the 19th century, Symbolist painting was one of the main artistic manifestations. Symbolists "sought represent absolute truths symbolically through language and metaphorical images".

According to Tanner's son Jesse Tanner, his father attempted to use his religious paintings to trigger a "receptive state of mind", that the paintings were meant to help viewers find communion with God.

=== Symbolic use of color ===
Tanner used nocturnal light to "give an aura of mystery" to his subjects. The effect was to help viewers suspend a modern outlook and enter Tanner's biblical world. Light was also an "expression of God" in Tanner's paintings, offering comfort, guidance and safety.

Tanner used color symbolically. In doing this, he joined contemporary Symbolists in the late 19th and early 20th centuries such as Franz von Stück or Johann Wolfgang von Goethe (Theory of Colours), who used color for its "psychological qualitities." Tanner's son Jesse described Tanner's use of "spiritual colors", saying that his father linked spiritual colors with spiritual themes. In Flight into Egypt, Tanner used blues and greens. Stück placed blues as affecting "mystery, eternity and calm." In a similarly colored work, Angels Appearing before the Shepherds, colored blue, green and shades of gray, his colors were described as "exuding the tranquility of God’s spiritual grace."

=== Holy Family, symbols of humility ===
Besides his use of color symbolism, Tanner used impressionist methods, not filling in the details on the people, leaving it up to the viewer's imagination. He used "faceless figures" in dim light to represent Mary and Joseph fleeing for their safety. Mary and Joseph and the infant Jesus, themselves symbols as the Holy Family are not portrayed in an elevated and idealized manner but as "normal folk", "generalized and demysticized" people with whom anyone could identify.

== See also ==
- List of paintings by Henry Ossawa Tanner
