= Abraham's Oak (painting) =

Painting by Henry Ossawa Tanner

- Abraham's Oak Near Hebron
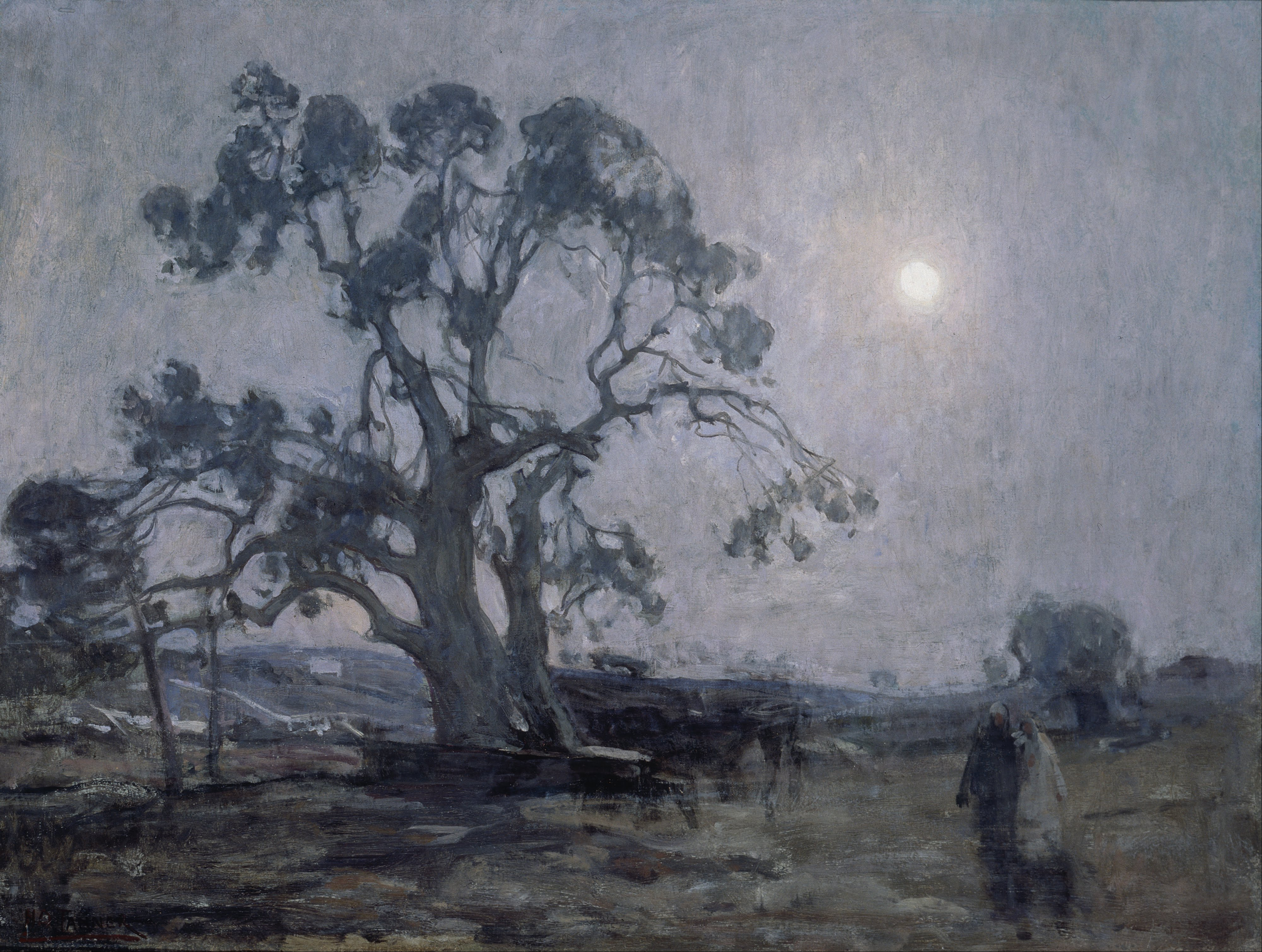
- Abraham's Oak
- Artist: Henry Ossawa Tanner
- Year: 1905
- Medium: Oil on canvas
- Movement: Impressionism
- Subject: Abraham, Oak of Mamre
- Dimensions: 54.4 cm × 72.8 cm (21 3/4 in × 28 3/4 in)
- Location: Smithsonian American Art Museum, Washington, D.C.
- Accession: 1983.95.185

Abraham's Oak is a painting by Henry Ossawa Tanner, an American painter who lived in France, completed about 1905. While Tanner is well known today for two paintings in the United States, The Banjo Lesson and The Thankful Poor, both about African-American families, the bulk of his artwork, including some of his most iconic paintings, were concerned with exploring biblical subjects. Abraham's Oak was supposed to be a place where Abraham pitched his tent and built an altar to God, who had promised the Land of Canaan for him and his children, and where he was visited by an angel.

Tanner may have visited the famous oak during a trip to the Middle East. At the time of his visit, the tree was in serious decline, its trunk supported with props and mostly leafless. However, Tanner collected at least one postcard of the tree, a painting by Johann Friedrich Perlberg and revisited the tree in memory, several years after a visit sometime in 1897-1899. It would number among many paintings of trees in the "nocturnal light."

The painting is an example of Tanner's frequent painting of subjects in the dim light of nighttime. Other similar works in which he used the technique to paint evening landscapes include Le Touquet, The Wise Men, Christ and his Disciples on the Road to Bethany, and The Good Shepherd.

== Deeper meaning ==
Over his lifetime Tanner was influenced by the painting styles he encountered, and produced works with characteristics of "Realism, Symbolism, Impressionism, and Orientalism." Sometimes he blended these; The Banjo Lesson is overall a work of realism or French genre painting applied to American subjects, but with an impressionistic use of light from multiple sides and in the painting's background. Similarly, The Thankful Poor also uses elements of impressionism blended into a French genre or American Realism artwork.

In the case of Abraham's Oak, the work can be described as impressionist, focusing on color, form and light and dismissing detail. The viewer is shown a tree under a moonlit sky with two people walking in the moonlight. But that is the overall impression; there is no detail. Color and generalized shapes (the painting's forms) and the way the scene is lit create the impression.

Abraham's Oak is also a symbolic painting in which ideas themselves are expressed through that impressionism. Newswriter Stephanie Brommer summarized the mix of symbolism with impressionistic technique in Abraham's Oak, saying the painting "radiates a mystical peace and spirituality with the moon's pale light and the symbolism of the oak, a majestic reminder of Abraham's years in Canaan centuries earlier."

== Ownership and display ==
=== 1905 ===
The painting was displayed as Abraham's Oak Near Hebron, at the 1905 exhibition of the Chicago Art Institute.

=== 1909 ===
In 1909, the painting was part of an exhibition of 33 of Tanner's religious works at the American Art Galleries in New York.

Tanner had been entering Salons and competitions in France and the United States and won many awards. However, rather than keep ownership he sold his paintings as income. He had never had an exhibition of his major works together in America, because these were held by museums and private collectors. For his exhibition, he was loaned paintings by their owners.

Among those lending artworks were Atherton Curtis and Rodman Wanamaker, friends and patrons to Tanner. Each had several of his paintings. Abraham's Oak was owned by Curtis.

Other works in the exhibition included Christ and Nicodemus (owned by the Pennsylvania Academy of Fine Art), Christ at the Home of Mary and Martha (owned by the Carnegie Institute), Judas Covenanting with the High Priests, The Return of the Holy Woman, Mary Pondered All These Things in Her Heart, and Christ Washing the Feet of the Disciples (owned by Wanamaker), Christ on to Road to Bethany, He Vanished Out of Their Sight, and On the Road to Emmaus (owned by Curtis).

The Good Shepherd, The Wise Men, The Flight Into Egypt, The Hiding of Moses, Mary and Behold, The Bridegroom Cometh were also named.

== See also ==
- List of paintings by Henry Ossawa Tanner
