= Sarah Elizabeth Tanner =

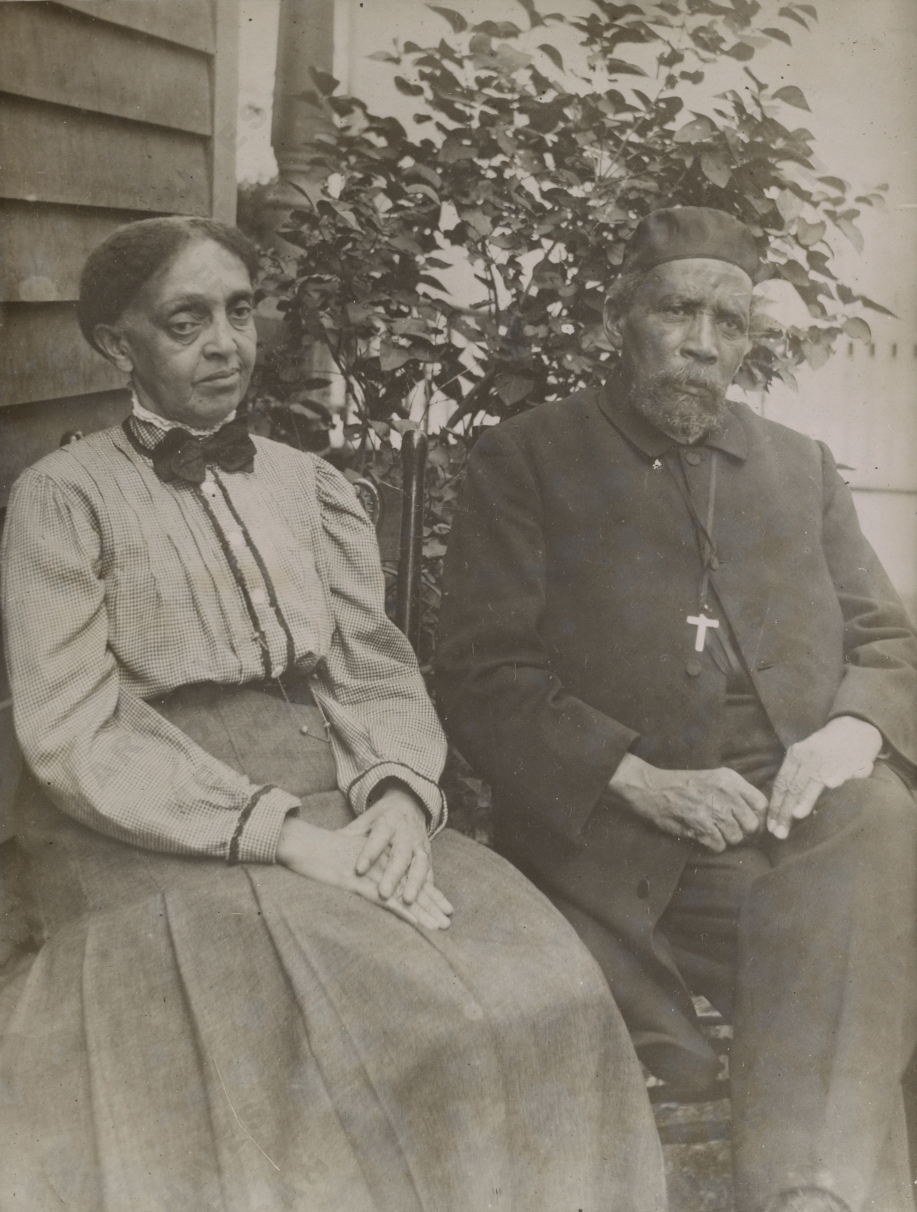
Mrs. Sarah Tanner with her husband Bishop Benjamin Tucker Tanner.

Sarah Elizabeth Tanner (May 18, 1840 — August 2, 1914) was active as a missionary worker and a religious leader in the African Methodist Episcopal Church.

She was the wife of Benjamin Tucker Tanner. She was the mother of the artist Henry Ossawa Tanner and the physician Halle Tanner Dillon Johnson, and the grandmother of civil rights activist Sadie Tanner Mossell Alexander.

She was the subject of two portraits by her son, his Portrait of an Artist's Mother and Mother of Henry O.

== Biography ==
Sarah Tanner was born in Winchester, Virginia as Sarah Elizabeth Miller, the daughter of Charles Jefferson Miller (1808 — 1856) and Louise (Saunders) Miller (1809 — ?), and one of their six children. Charles was the mulatto son of a Virginia planter who took his family to "the free state of Pennsylvania" in 1846, driving them north in an ox cart. Alternatively, the family may have moved to Pittsburgh, Pennsylvania in 1843. Sarah's father took work as a porter in Pittsburgh, but died when she was 16. Homeschooled, she was able to attend Avery College, and became a teacher after her father's death. Her studies at college were cut short with her father's death.

There is another version of Sarah's history, in which she was said to be one of eleven children born to an enslaved mother, who sent Sarah north using the Underground Railroad. In this version of the story, the family was divided up by the Pennsylvania Abolitionist Society, and Sarah was sent to Pittsburgh.

She married Benjamin Tucker Tanner in 1858.

== Life ==
With her husband she had nine children, managing to raise seven of them to adulthood. She was praised for her devotion to her family, working as a homemaker for more than 25 years and managing her family's finances. Married to a Methodist minister (later a Bishop), her own religious convictions were strong, and she taught children in her church's Sabbath School. She also engaged in missionary work, acting as president and treasurer of the "Parent Mite Missionary Society." As her children matured, she was able to devote more time to missionary work, traveling "throughout the country."

== Death and interment ==
A resident of 2908 Diamond Street in Philadelphia, Pennsylvania in her early seventies, Tanner died at the age of 74 in Philadelphia on August 2, 1914. She was interred at the Merion Memorial Park in Bala Cynwyd.

== Portraits ==
Henry Ossawa Tanner focused his talent on two portraits of his mother, "the central, stabilizing figure in her large and distinguished African American family."

Henry painted the earlier image (Portrait of the Artist's Mother) during a visit home in 1897. Over his father's objections, he had left home to become an artist, studying in Philadelphia, beginning 1879 and then in Paris in 1891. However his parents did not stop his dreams, even offering financial support. He had achieved what few Americans had, success in the Paris Salon and the beginnings of a successful career as an artist. The painting was one of at least three works that her son made which showed African American subjects with an attitude of respect, so different from mainstream portrayals in the late 1890s. The painting is an example in which Henry mixed American Realism with Impressionism in a style also seen in two other works, The Banjo Lesson and The Thankful Poor.

The second image Mother of Henry O. is closer in style to his later impressionist-style paintings.

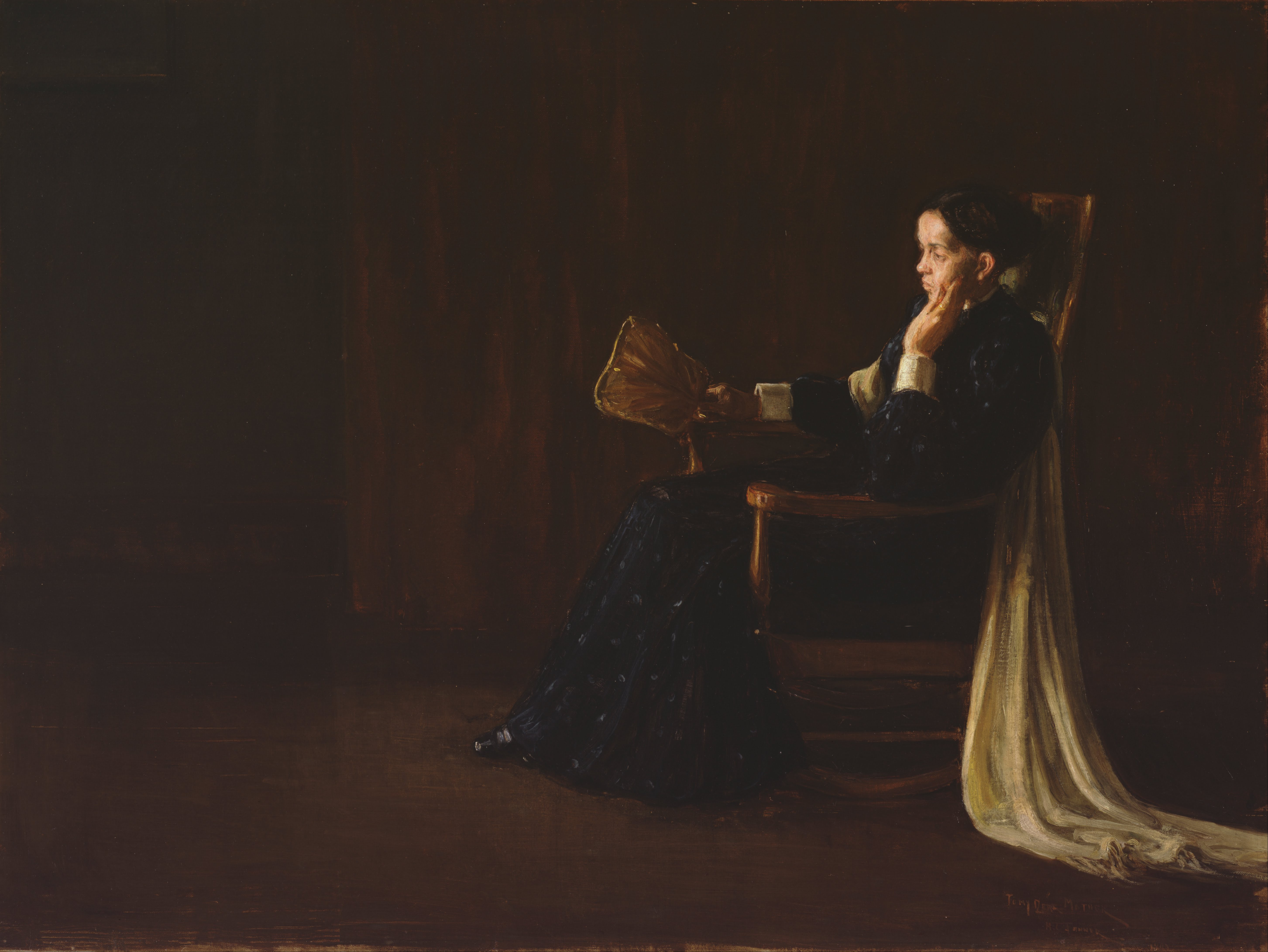
Portrait of the Artist's Mother by Henry Ossawa Tanner. 1896.

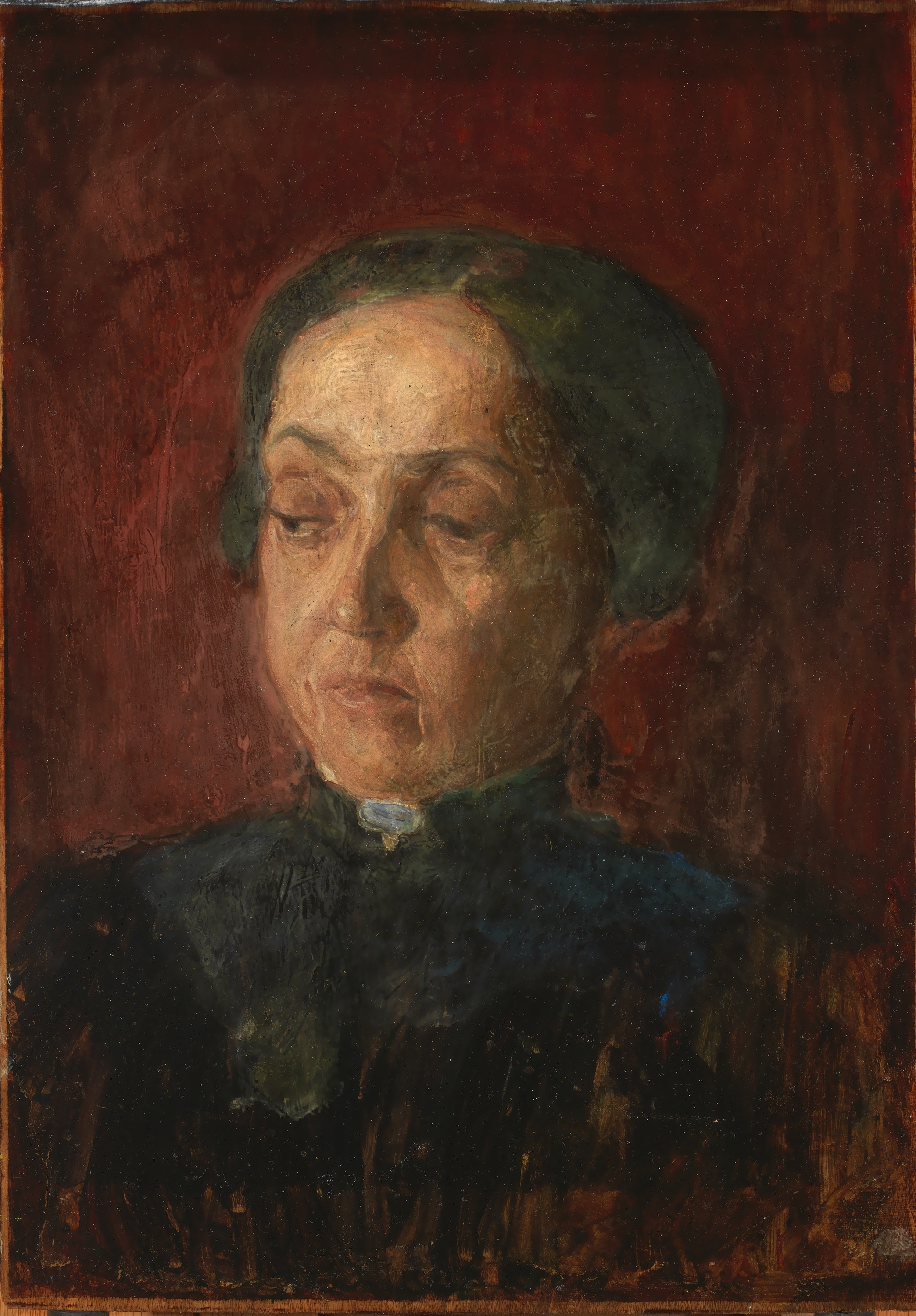
Mother of Henry O. Tanner, a second portrait of Sarah Elizabeth Tanner by Henry Ossawa Tanner. Undated.
