= Evelyn Nordhoff Bindery =

The Evelyn Nordhoff Bindery was the continuation of Evelyn Hunter Nordhoff's Elephant Bindery at 39 Washington Place in New York City. Left to two of her students, Florence Foote and possibly May Rosina Prat or Minnie Prat, after Nordhoff's death in 1898, the Elephant Bindery was still located at Nordhoff's home in 1899 at 115 East 56th Street in New York City.

The Elephant Bindery was later reestablished as the Evelyn Nordhoff Bindery by the Evelyn Hunter Nordhoff Association, honoring Nordhoff's desire to form a school of industrial arts for women, to include the bindery and leatherwork among other arts. The bindery school was run principally by bookbinder Florence Foote, being an important studio which opened up the teaching the whole craft of bookbinding to women (as opposed to limited by union rules to only folding, sorting, sewing pamphlets or endbands). The Nordhoff Bindery was at some point relocated to the Art Students' League in New York City.

== Students ==
Known students include:

- Edith Diehl
