= Fitzroy Carrington =

Fitzroy Carrington (November 6, 1869 – December 31, 1954) was an English-born American editor who became known as a leading authority on prints, particularly those of the 15th and 16th centuries.

Born in Surbiton, Surrey, his high school education was at Victoria College, Jersey, and he came to the United States in 1886. He obtained an honorary College degree in the USA shortly before teaching at Harvard. His brother was the famed writer and psychic researcher Hereward Carrington.

For 21 years (1892–1913) he was identified with Frederick Keppel & Co. (New York City) dealers in etchings and engravings, being a member of the firm after 1899. During this period he made a specialty of selecting, arranging, and writing introductions for artistic editions of such works as Dante's New Life; The Queen's Garland (Elizabethan verse); Rossetti's Pictures and Poems; William Morris's The Doom of King Acristus; The King's Lyrics (1899); The Shepherd's Pipes (1903); The Pilgrim's Staff (1906).

In 1911, the year before publishing Prints and their Makers, he had undertaken the editorship of The Print Collector’s Quarterly, a journal unique in the United States. He continued to be editor after 1913, although then giving up his business interests to become lecturer on the history and principles of engraving, at Harvard University, and appointed curator of prints at the Museum of Fine Arts, Boston in 1912. While working at Harvard and the Museum of Fine Arts, He resided in Belmont, Massachusetts, in an historic revival style house. He purchased this house from the original architect/builder/owner, who built an adjacent similar home partially financed by Carrington appending a portion of the adjacent lot. He resigned as editor of The Print Collector’s Quarterly in 1917, but became the American editor of the same periodical in 1921, the year he resigned from the Museum of Fine Arts. He is the author of Engravers and Etchers (Scammon Lectures, 1921) and On Print Collecting (1929).

Carrington died at the age of 85 while visiting friends in the Connecticut town of Old Lyme.
