= Timothy Cole =

American wood engraver (1852–1931)

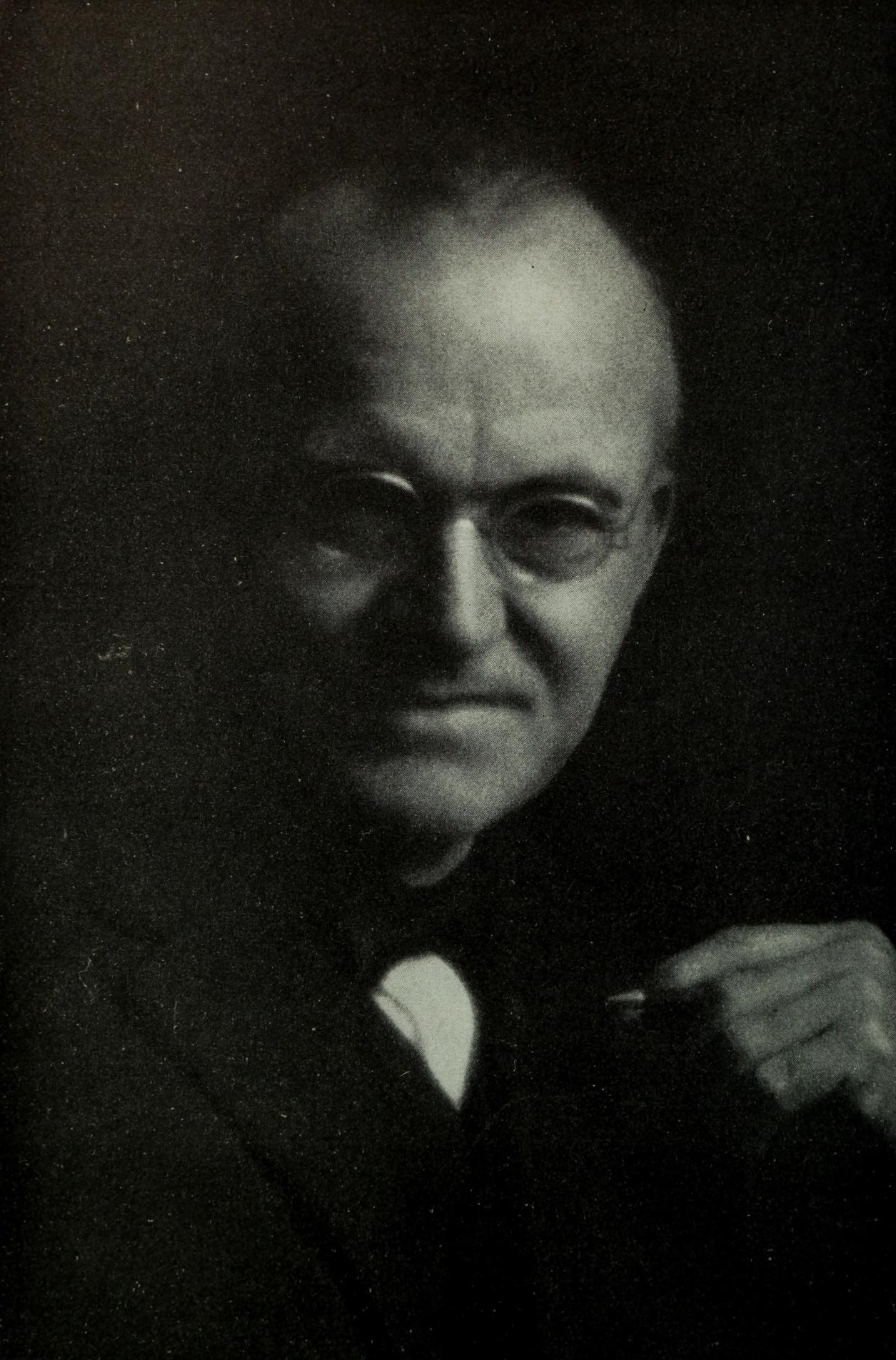
- Born: 1852; London, England
- Died: 17 May 1931 (aged 79); New York, United States
- Occupation: Wood engraving
- Children: Alphaeus Philemon Cole

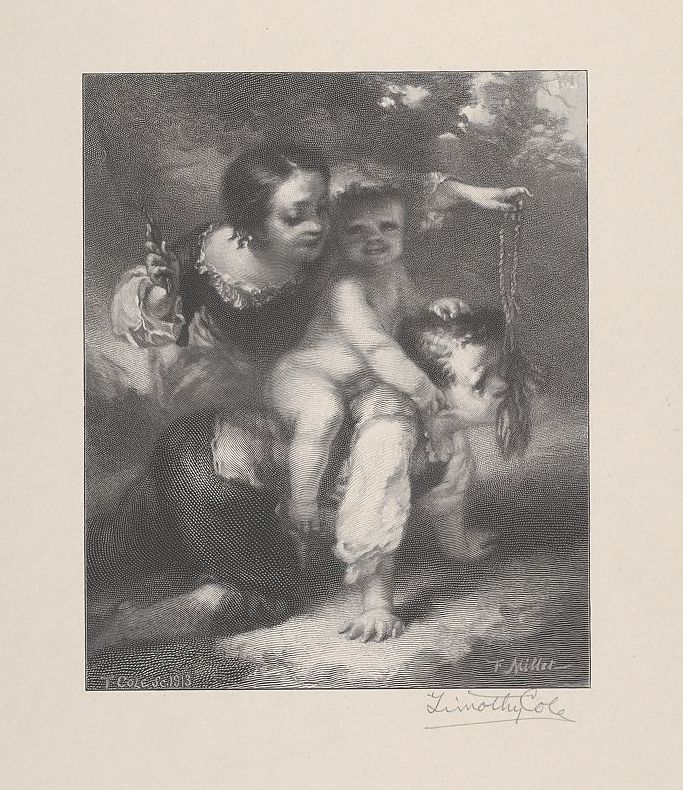
Lessons In Horsemanship by Timothy Cole

Timothy Cole (1852 – 17 May 1931) was an American wood engraver.

== Biography ==
Timothy Cole was born in 1852 in London, England, his family emigrated to the United States in 1858.

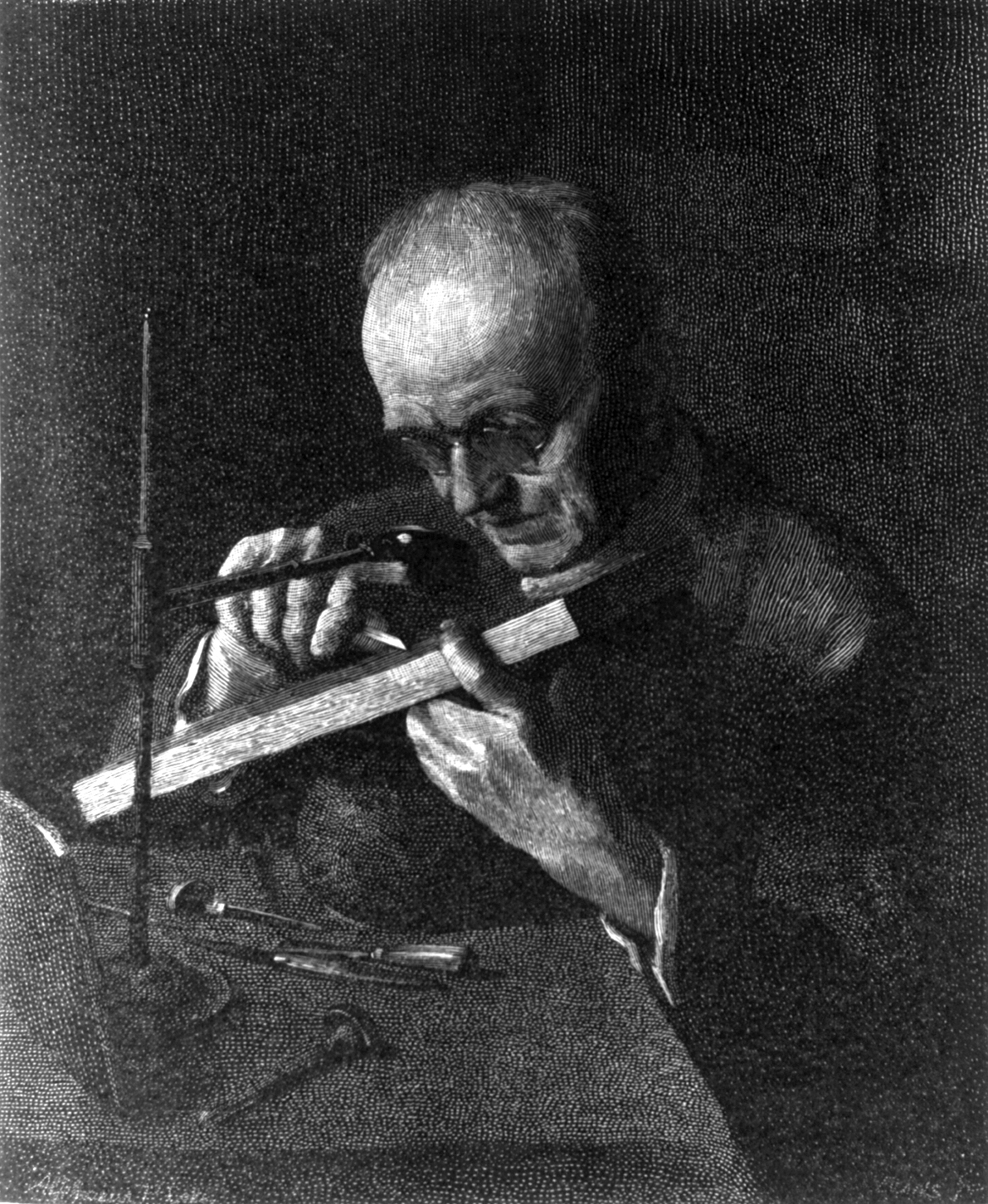
Wood engraving of Cole making a wood engraving

He established himself in Chicago, where in the great fire of 1871 he lost everything he possessed. In 1875, he moved to New York City, finding work on the Century (then Scribner's) magazine. Cole was associated with the magazine for 40 years as a pioneer craftsman of wood engraving.

He immediately attracted attention by his unusual facility and his sympathetic interpretation of illustrations and pictures, and his publishers sent him abroad in 1883 to engrave a set of blocks after the old masters in the European galleries. These achieved for him a brilliant success. His reproductions of Italian, Dutch, Spanish, Flemish and English pictures were published in book form with appreciative notes by the engraver himself. He published his prints in several books: Old Italian Masters (1892), Old Dutch and Flemish Masters (1895), Old English Masters (1902), and Old Spanish Masters (1907).

Though the advent of new mechanical processes had rendered wood engraving almost a lost art and left practically no demand for the work of such craftsmen, Mr Cole was thus enabled to continue his work, and became one of the foremost contemporary masters of wood engraving. He received a medal of the first class at the Paris Exhibition of 1900, and the only grand prize given for wood engraving at the Louisiana Purchase Exposition at St Louis, Missouri, in 1904. In 1906 he was elected into the National Academy of Design as an Associate Academician, and became a full Academician in 1908.

His son, Alphaeus Philemon Cole, was a noted portraitist who is also today recognized as having been the world's oldest verified living man at the time of his death.

== Collections ==
- Art Institute of Chicago
- Metropolitan Museum of Art
- Smithsonian American Art Museum

== Bibliography ==
- Anon (1911). "Timothy Cole: A Biographical Note", The Print Collector’s Quarterly, Vol 1, No. 3, p. 344.
- Cary, Elisabeth Luther (1911). "Timothy Cole and Henry Wolf: Two Masters of Modern Wood-Engraving," The Print Collector’s Quarterly, Vol 1, No. 3, p. 319.
- Cole, Timothy (1911). "Some Difficulties of Wood-Engraving," The Print Collector’s Quarterly, Vol 1, No. 3, p. 335.
- Robert Underwood, Johnson (1918). "Timothy Cole," The Art World, Vol. 3, No. 5, p. 376.
