= Edith Diehl =

American bookbinder (1876–1953)

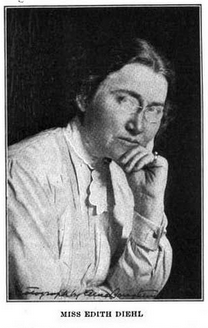
- Edith Diehl, from a 1918 publication.
- Born: May 21, 1876; Brewster, New York
- Died: May 12, 1953 (aged 76); Brewster, New York
- Writing career
- Notable works: Bookbinding, its Background and Technique, 1946

Edith Diehl (May 21, 1876 – May 12, 1953) was an American bookbinder and author of Bookbinding, its Background and Technique (Rinehart and Co., 1946), a classic text and manual on the history and craft of bookbinding in two volumes (republished in editions by Kennicat Press, 1965; Hacker Art Books, 1979; Dover, 1980). In 1947, in recognition of her accomplishments, Diehl was made an Honorary Life Member of the Guild of Book Workers.

Diehl is also known for her wartime works, having closed her studio in 1914 to become Director of Workrooms for the American Red Cross. In 1917, she was asked by trustees of Wellesley College to become Director of the Woman's Land Army of America Training Camp and Experiment Station, which led to her appointment as National Director at the headquarters in Washington, D.C. where she wrote a handbook for use in the national camps.

== Biography ==
Diehl was born in Brewster, New York (within the Town of Southeast, in Putnam County), the daughter of Philip (a baker and ice-cream parlor owner) and Josephine Lee Diehl. (A Ralph Diehl, possibly a brother, is cited as Brewster Bakery owner and postmaster in 1923 in Br). She attended Drew Seminary in Carmel, New York. Philip was a German immigrant, and bilingual in German and English. She studied philosophy at the University of Jena, Germany, for 2 years at the age of 22 after leaving Wellesley. She graduated from Wellesley College, Massachusetts, in 1904.

Edith was one of the founders of the Brewster Public Library.

Edith Diehl died, May 12, 1953 at her home in Brewster.

== Bookbinding career ==
=== Training ===
About finding bookbinding as a career, it was reported that she "grew so fond of books at Wellesley (...) that she decided to be one of those who give first editions a new lease on life by putting them in comfortable and at the same time decorative surroundings." In interview, she herself stated: "I loved books so much that I wanted to be able to put them in bindings myself. I took up bookbinding in 1902, and studied at the Evelyn Nordhoff Bindery in New York City. " She began formal studies in New York City with Florence Foote at the (Evelyn) Nordhoff Bindery in 1902, and soon moved to England to study in the studios of Nordhoff's teacher Thomas J. Cobden-Sanderson, his student Douglas Cockerell, and the firm of Sangorski & Sutcliffe. She had abandoned her hopes of becoming a teacher and devoted 5 years of apprentice work in England, France, and Belgium. During those 5 years, she took lessons from Evelyn Nordhoff, the first woman bookbinder in the United States. After two years in England, she moved to Paris to work at the ateliers of Mercier, and Domont, then to the ateliers of DeBuhl (DeBuyl) and Jacobs in Brussels and then returned to England to study at Westminster Abbey.

=== Teaching ===
She established bookbinding courses at the Mansfield school for the rehabilitation of soldiers. From 1917, she directed the formulation of units in every agricultural college from coast to coast.

=== Professional studios ===
Diehl stated, ″it was only after five years of intensive study and practical work that I hung out my shingle.″ Diehl had bookbinding studios in various sequential locations in New York City during the first half of the twentieth century, moving uptown by degrees from Gramercy to Sutton Place, with interruptions during both World Wars. For a time, she went to work as the house director of binding for William Edwin Rudge, supervising the binding production of books by Bruce Rogers.

She set up her first bindery in 1906, and taught up until her death. Her first bindery opened at 121 East 23rd street. She had made so many orders, that within a few months, she moved to larger quarters at 11 West 42nd Street. She had moved again a year later, for the same reasons.

== Legacy ==
Jeffrey Peachey, a book conservator, tool maker and historian has published blog posts on one of Diehl's backing hammers.

An example of a signed Diehl binding, the Sonnets of Michael Angelo Buonarroti as described in The Sun article cited, is available at The New York Public Library, Spencer Collection. Examples of plaquettes and designs are available at the Morgan Library & Museum.

Diehl's papers, including correspondence, notes and some photographs (photographer unknown) are held at the Archives of American Art, the Morgan Library & Museum and The Grolier Club.

She had bound books with President Wilson and Marshal Joffre.

=== Red Cross ===
With the coming of World War I, she offered her services to the Red Cross. She organized over 500 workrooms and increased production by arranging for the cutting of bandages by electrically operated cutters. In 1915, she resigned from her Red Cross connection after moving to Brewster.
