= Headband (disambiguation) =

A headband is a topless headgear.

Headband may also refer to:

- Headband (band), a 1970s Australian band formed by Peter Head
- "Headband" (song), a song by B.o.B.
- "The Headband", an episode of the television series Avatar: The Last Airbender
- Endband, a part of a bound book
- "Head Band" (Dexter's Laboratory), a 2003 episode

== See also ==
- Shiva's Headband, an early Texas psychedelic rock band, formed in Austin in 1967
- Tonto's Expanding Head Band, an electronic music duo consisting of Malcolm Cecil and Robert Margouleff
