= Frederick Keppel =

Frederick Keppel may refer to:

- Frederick Keppel (bishop) (1728–1777), Church of England bishop of Exeter
- Frederick Keppel (art dealer) (1845–1912), American art dealer
- Frederick Paul Keppel (1875–1943), American educator and philanthropist

== See also ==
- Frederick Kappel (1902–1994), American businessman
