= Endband =

Cylindrical band part of a bound book

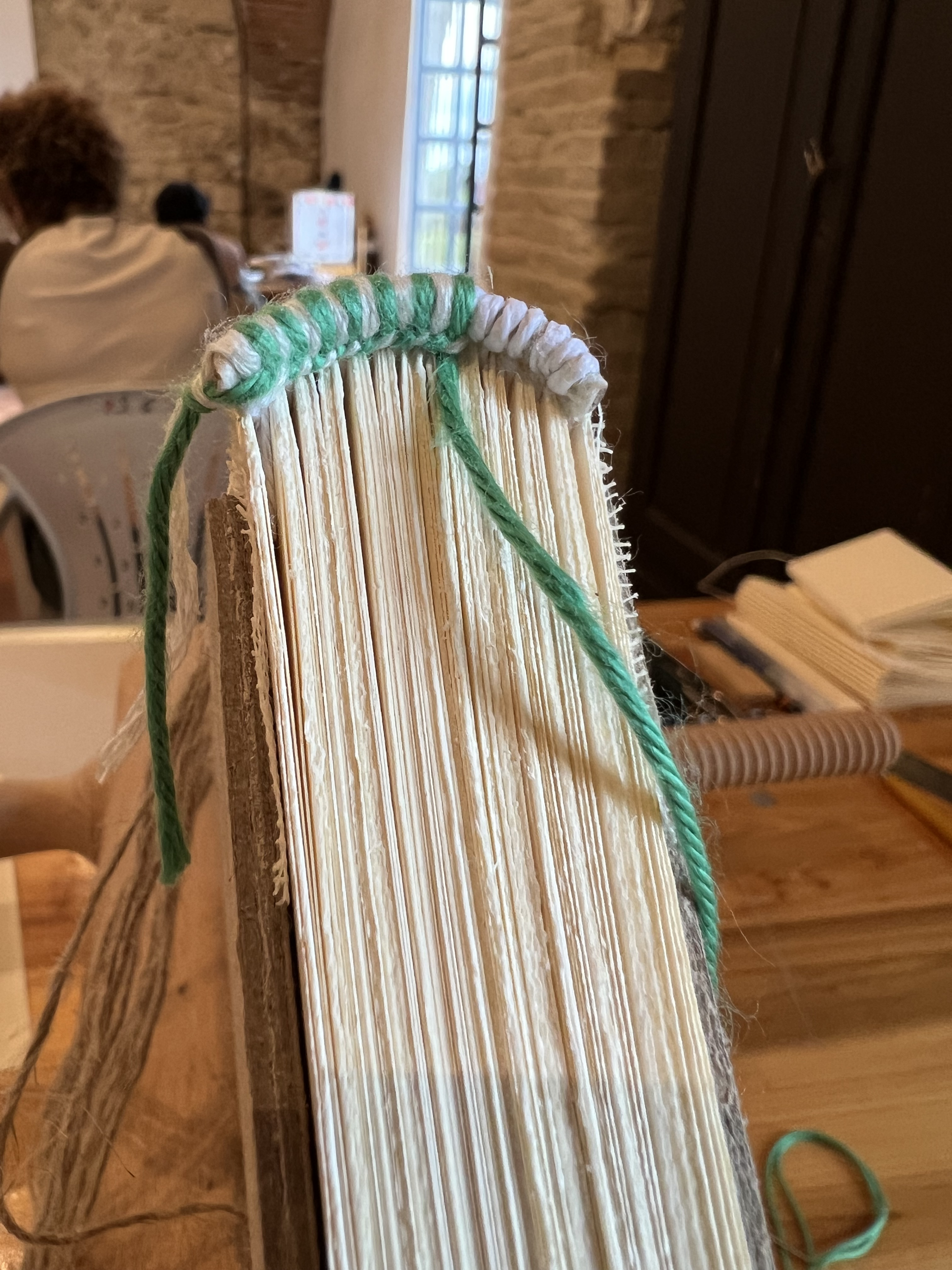
The process of sewing a green and white secondary endband over a white primary endband. Front beads are visible.

An endband is a cylindrical band sewn and/or glued to the head and tail of the spine of a book. It is slightly raised above the bookblock. An endband along the top edge of the book is called a headband, and one along the bottom edge is called a tailband. Sewn endbands, or 'true' endbands, are sewn into the gatherings of the bookblock and perform a mechanical function. They strengthen the sewing of the bookblock and sometimes the joint as well (the connection between the spine and cover boards). Endbands can also be used to shape the spine. Sewn endbands never occur on adhesive bindings, and are today mostly practiced in book arts, conservation settings, and traditional book binderies.

== Terms ==
Book binding terms vary by time period and location. Christopher Clarkson first used the word ‘endband’ in 1967 to speak about medieval book binding. The following terms are used by Conservation Wiki (operated by the American Institute for Conservation, also called AIC Wiki), Ligatus (full name The Language of Bindings Thesaurus), and J.A. Szirmai's book The Archeology of Medieval Bookbinding (London, 1999).

The basic elements of an endband are the support (sometimes called the core), which is made of cord, leather, catgut, or vellum, and the thread, which can be silk or linen. Sometimes there is no support.

Tie-downs are a type of stitch that passes through the gathering, right below a sewing support on the spine. This stitch helps to keep the endband in place and improves the strength of the spine, especially near the head and tail of the bookblock. It is a common way to affix the endband to the book.

Primary endbands are sewn first and are typically structural. They are usually executed with the same thread used to sew the spine. A compound endband is created when a secondary endband is sewn over the primary endband. This secondary endband is decorative. "Beads," or the knots formed from securing the sewing, can appear on the front and back of the endband.

== Origins ==
Medieval manuscripts have often been rebound, sometimes several times. Bindings deteriorate from use and endbands are especially vulnerable. In bindings that do survive, endbands are typically damaged or unraveled. These are used to create experimental facsimiles that reveal the original construction. Endbands provided integral support to heavy medieval codices with wooden cover boards. Early endbands in western and eastern binding traditions extended over the top edges of the boards, providing another connection between the spine and the covers. Endbands in early modern books also supported the spine. When shelving practices shifted towards vertical, outward facing spines in the 16th century, the endband came to have a protective role when books were pulled off the shelf by the spine. However, also at this time the endbands gradually ceased to be connected to the cover boards and so lost their structural role for the spine-cover connection, and became mostly aesthetic.

== Variations in decoration and method ==
Medieval endbands in eastern and western book binding traditions served both mechanical and aesthetic purposes. Medieval bookbinding practice was not standardized. Different regions, monasteries, and workshops created their own solutions to problems and created new artistic developments. This resulted in a plethora of variations. Szirmai categories medieval endbands into seven groups. A main variable of a medieval endband is its relationship to the material covering the spine—leather, fabric, etc. If the material has been folded over itself, and does not interact with the endband, it is called a headcap. Another variable is when the endband is sewn during the bookbinding process. It can be sewn at various stages of completing the spine and covering the book.

Historians debate the dating and location of endband types. Ongoing research reveals new interpretations. Szirmai's 1999 book The Archaeology of Medieval Bookbinding is the most important publication to date for information on medieval endbands. This work uses the categories Carolingian, Romanesque, and Gothic for western medieval bindings.

=== Integral endbands ===
Integral endbands, sometimes called “kapitalbünde” as they are mostly found in books bound in Germany, are created during the sewing of the bookblock. They can be placed below the top of the spine, and are often mistaken as another spine support. They usually do not have decoration, and can be hidden beneath the spine covering. Whether or not “kapitalbünde” belong to the category of endbands is contested. Szirmai explains them as endbands, but Ligatus states that they are not ‘true’ endbands.

=== Byzantine/Greek endbands ===
Byzantine binding, from the area and period of the late Byzantine Empire, shares many characteristics with Greek binding and they are often grouped together as a tradition. Greek binding is characterized by unsupported sewing (the bookblock was sewn without cords or leather), and so the endbands role in the structure of the book was very important. It strengthens the connection between the boards and the spine. The endbands on both the head and tail stretch from the spine outwards onto the tops of the boards, meaning that the books had to be stored horizontally. The supports were typically cord, but could be leather. These endbands created a very strong binding. Holes were carved into the board to imitate the tie-downs through the gatherings. The concept of primary and secondary endbands is not applicable to Greek bindings. The secondary endband can be very structural. The steps in creating the endband can also be reversed, negating the concept of ‘primary’ and ‘secondary’ all together. Although most Greek endbands were undecorated, the rounded shape that they created had aesthetic purpose.

=== Ethiopian endbands ===
The earliest existing endband of this type is from the fourteenth century. The endband is constructed from a piece of leather woven into a slit braid. This is then sewn onto the top of the spine, into the gatherings and out through the spine covering. Two rows of stitches appear on the spine from this process.

=== Armenian endbands ===
Armenian endbands are compound endbands, with the secondary endband sewn on three cords. The resulting chevron pattern is usually made from threads in red, white, and black. These endbands extend over the coverboards, like Greek endbands.

=== Carolingian and Romanesque endbands ===
Certain traditions and methods lasted longer in some areas, and this variation means that the boundaries between categories of Carolingian, Romanesque, and Gothic are not strict. The tab lining which the endband secures to the spine was a new feature in Carolingian binding. Supports were typically cord. Romanesque bindings could have several types of endbands. The tab linings continued to be used in Romanesque binding, and the headband was sewn through the material as in Carolingian styles. In Romanesque bindings, fabrics with patterns were used on the tab lining. The supports of Romanesque endbands changed from cord to leather strips.

=== Gothic endbands ===
The Gothic period has the largest variety of endband styles for books with wooden boards. Tab linings were no longer as common. Sewn into each gathering, the cord support is then secured through holes in the wooden boards. It acts mechanically like the double raised cords of the spine. One type of Gothic decoration is a woven leather endband. Leather strips are connected to the cover material and then woven around the primary endband.

Another type of Gothic secondary endband is the saddle-stitch from the fifteenth and sixteenth centuries. In this variation, the extra material from the spine is folded over the primary endband and secured by sewing between the spine and the support of the endband. This method attaches the extra cover material around the spine ends to the endband, rather than tucking this material behind the endband or cutting it off. It resulted in a stronger binding.

=== Conservation endbands ===
Conservation grade endbands are part of the rebinding practice of medieval manuscripts. A method using back beads was devised by Christopher Clarkson to imitate a medieval endband structure while putting less strain on the spine. Certain constructions of endbands are more supportive for the structure of the bookblock.

=== Modern endbands (Stuck-on endbands) ===
Modern endbands are usually aesthetic only. To a degree, they help protect the head cap of the spine when the book is pulled off the shelf. Rolled stuck-on endbands, which are decorative only, emerged as a common feature of books in nineteenth-century England. These evolved into the manufactured strips that a modern bookbinder uses today. The strip is cut to the size of the spine, and glued along the head and tail of the bookblock before the coverboards are attached. There is evidence for stuck-on endbands used in medieval manuscripts, the earliest being from the sixteenth century.

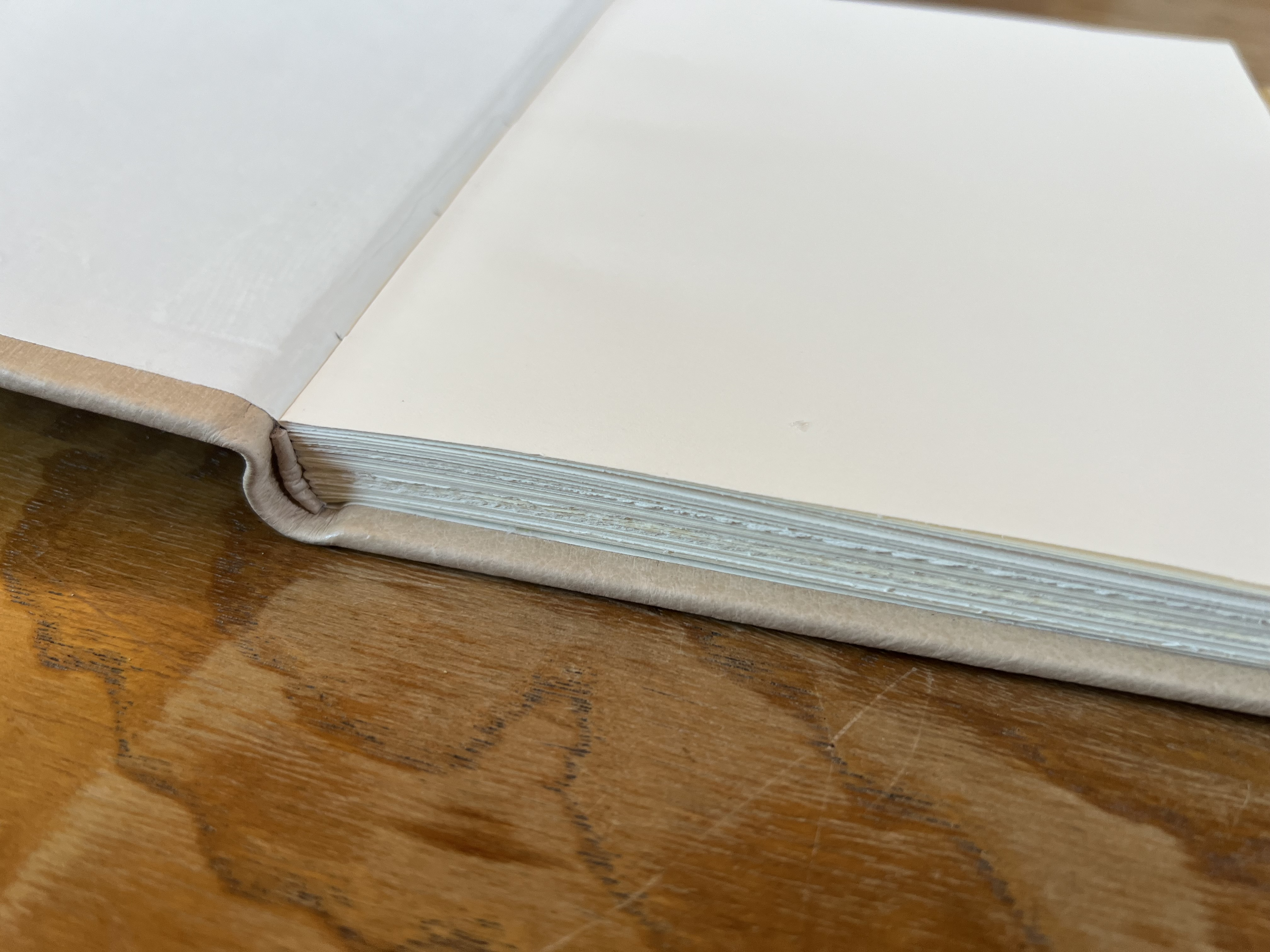
Example of rolled, stuck-on endband in leather.

== See also ==
- Ethiopian binding
- Coptic binding
- Manuscripts
- Codex
- Illuminated manuscript
- Book binding
