= Print (magazine) =

American graphic design magazine

- January/February 2007 issue.
- Categories: Graphic design
- First issue: June 1940
- Final issue: December 2017
- Company: Print Holdings LLC (formerly F+W Media)
- Country: United States
- Based in: Austin, Texas
- Language: English
- Website: printmag.com
- ISSN: 0032-8510

Print is an American design and culture website that began as Print, A Quarterly Journal of the Graphic Arts, in 1940, and continued publishing a physical edition through the end of 2017 as Print.

As a printed publication, Print was a general-interest magazine, written by cultural reporters and critics who looked at design in its social, political, and historical contexts, from newspapers and book covers to Web-based motion graphics, from corporate branding to indie-rock posters. During its run, Print won five National Magazine Awards and a number of Folio: Eddies, including Best Full Issue in its final year. Print ceased publication in 2017, with a promise to focus the brand on "a robust and thriving online community." Its publisher, F+W Media, declared bankruptcy in 2019, and a group of independent partners subsequently purchased PRINT from the company that arose out of F+W, Peak Media Properties.

== Founding ==
The journal was founded by William Edwin Rudge to demonstrate “the far reaching importance of the graphic arts” including art prints, commercial printing, wallpaper, etc. Contents were eclectic covering typography, book making, book printing, fine prints as well as the trade journal aspects of printing candy bar wrappers.

Initially the publication included original prints such as the frontispiece for Vol 1, #1 (Jun 1940) a two color woodcut by Hans Alexander Mueller and Vol 1, #3 (December 1940) a black and white wood engraving by Paul Landacre.

By Volume 8 (1953) the focus of the periodical had shifted to a trade journal.

== Name changes ==
- Vol 1, #1 (Jun 1940) Print: A Quarterly Journal of the Graphic Arts
- Vol 3, #2 (Summer 1942) combined with The Printing Art. An Illustrated Monthly Magazine of the Art of Printing and of the Allied Arts but continued under Print: A Quarterly Journal of the Graphic Arts

=== Until ===
- Vol 7, #1 (Aug 1951) Print: combining: Print, A Quarterly Journal of Graphic Arts, Vol. VII, Number 1 and The Print Collector's Quarterly, Volume XXX, Number 4.
- Vol 7, #2 (Jan 1952) Print, The Magazine of the Graphic Arts - until
- Vol 9, #2 (Oct/Nov 1954) Print - until
- Vol 11, #4 (Jan/Feb 1958) Print, The Magazine of Visual Communication - until
- Vol 12, #1 (July/Aug 1958) Print, America's Graphic Design Magazine at least until May/June 2005 Vol 59, #3.
