= Ethiopian binding =

Bookbinding technique dating from sixteenth-century Ethiopia

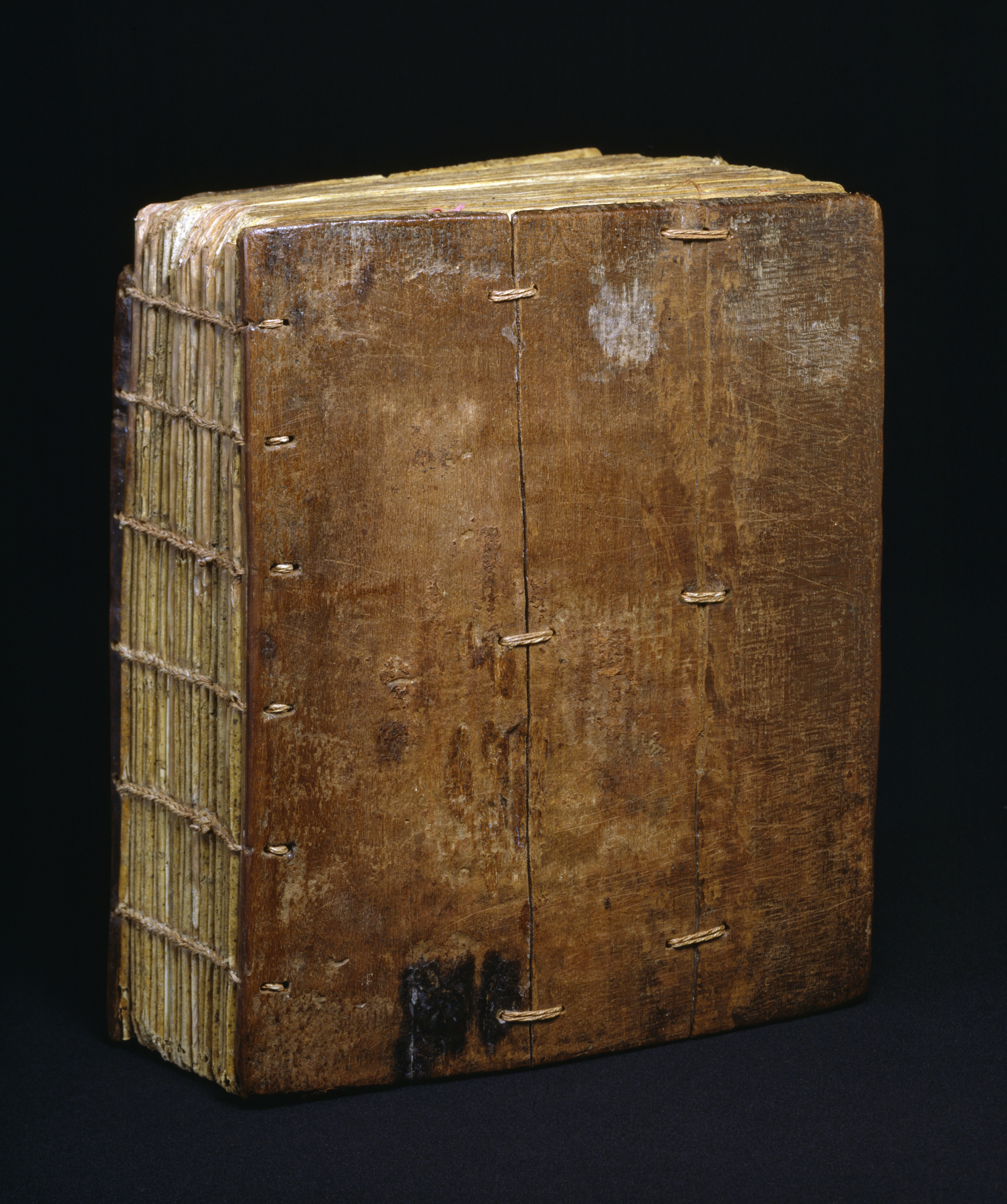
An Ethiopian gospel book bound at the Gunda Gunde Monastery in the first half of the 16th century.

The Ethiopian or Ethiopic bookbinding technique (medegos) is a chain stitch sewing technique which resembles the multi-section Coptic binding method. A book bound in this style consists of folded parchment leaves bound into quires which are sandwiched between two wooden covers; these are sewn together through holes made in the edges of the boards. Most of the books were left uncovered without endbands. Existing manuscripts ranged greatly in size from books small enough to fit in a pocket to large volumes over 45cm high.

== History and background ==
Ethiopia developed a literary tradition in the first millennium BCE, significantly earlier that the rest of sub-Saharan Africa. This was further developed following the introduction of Christianity in the 4th century.

The earliest surviving books, written in Geʽez, date back prior the thirteenth century. The Gospel books of the Abba Gärima monastery are among the first known Ethiopian manuscripts. The chain stitch binding dates from the late sixteenth century in Ethiopia and Eritrea. Scrolls and accordion books were also common. Book-making was a specialist profession and provided a source of income for the church.

The text of the books was laid out in one to four columns, with the size and layout of the parchment leaves depending on the type of book being created; many types of religious texts had conventional arrangements (one column for Psalms and prayer books, two columns for many liturgical books, three column for a Synaxarion, etc.)

The text of the books was generally written with a black carbon-based ink derived from soot and vegetable ingredients. Red ink, derived from plant materials, was used for headings, elements of punctuation, and elements of religious significance. The ink would be applied with pens made from reeds or bamboo.

Codices were traditionally stored in leather satchels which could be hung for easy storage and provided protection from rodents and flooding.

== Materials ==
The codices were made of parchment, most commonly produced from the skin of goats (paper was not introduced until the 19th century). Less commonly the skins of horses, sheep, cattle, gazelles, lions, and tigers were used. The skin was first immersed in water for 3-7 days (dried skins took longer to soften than fresh skins). It was then stripped of its hair, scraped, treated with pumice stone, dried, and rubbed smooth with fine sand or clay.

The pages of the book were bound between thin wooden boards. Cedarwood, Cordia africana, and Olea africana were most commonly used. Boards from old books were often re-used. The thread could be of animal (gut, sinew) or vegetable origin.

== Construction ==
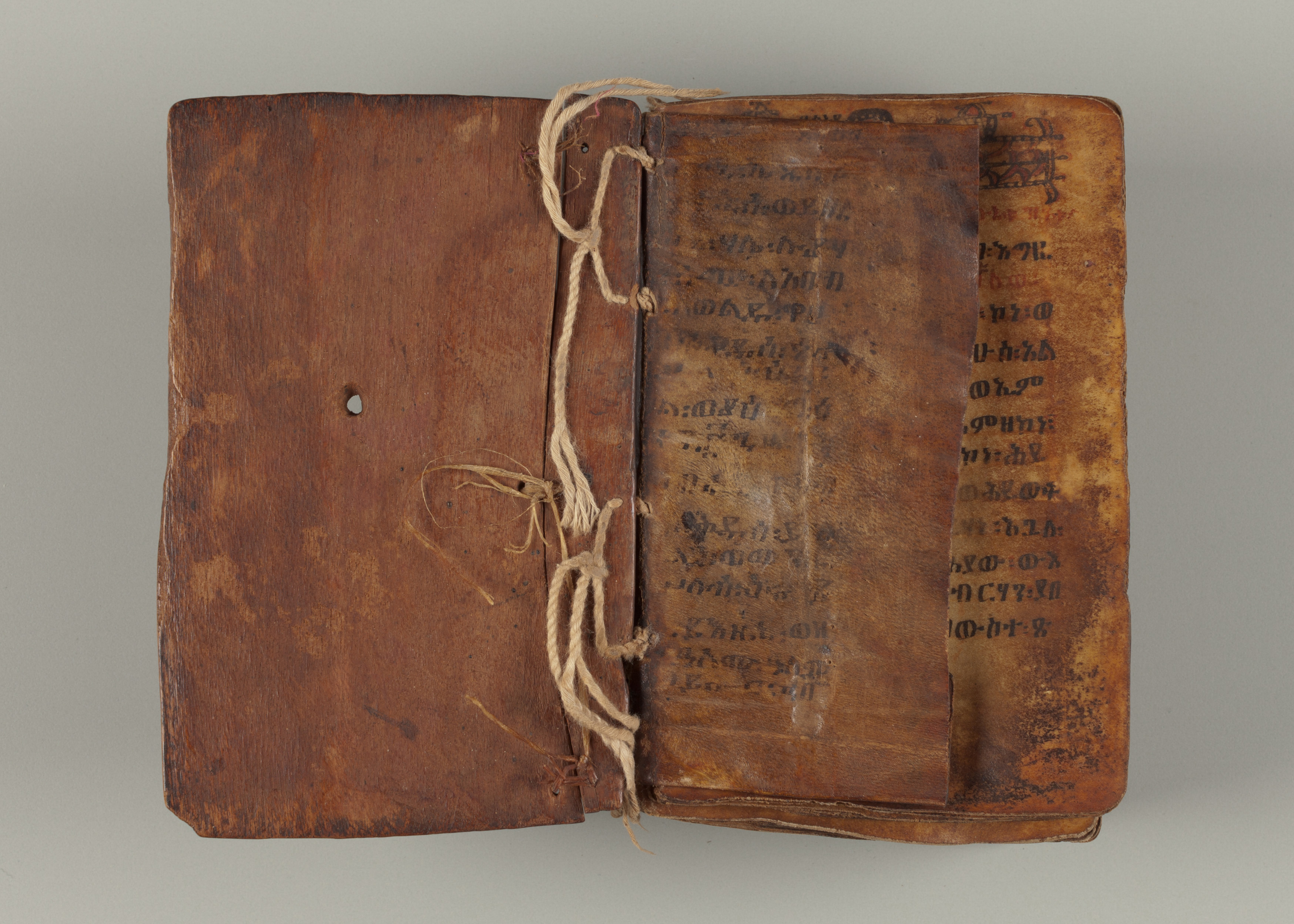
The cover of an Ethiopic manuscript

Holes were made in the parchment in a straight line using a needle prior to the text being copied. The pieces of parchment were folded into quires. A single book could contain over twenty-five quires.

Like the Coptic binding method, the Ethiopian binding method uses an unsupported chain-stitch to connect the quires, producing a book with a chain-like pattern of threads on the spine. The Ethiopian method is distinguished by the use of independent threads for each pair of sewing stations (i.e. if there are two holes, two needles would be used...or four holes, four needles etc.). Books generally had two or four holes but could have up to six holes. Rare examples of bindings containing an odd number of holes have been documented. The binder might start sewing from the center of the first quire or from the upper board. A number of variations in the sewing pattern have been documented.

Most of the books did not have endbands. When present, these were not generally sewn through the boards.

The finished books were often covered in goat, sheep, or ox leather, with the turn-ins generally glued on the inner face of the covers. Occasionally they were adorned with metal plates. Leather covers were often embellished using blind-tooled decoration; crosses, circles, and palm leaves were all common motifs. Some books included attached page-markers. The creation of a single book generally took a minimum of five months.

== Surviving examples and conservation ==
Bindings were routinely discarded and replaced when they became worn out or their design no longer fit the current style; despite this practice, there are over 9,000 documented manuscripts bound in this tradition. Most of the surviving covers are relatively ornate. The Biblioteca Apostolica Vaticana in Rome, the Bibliothèque nationale in France, and the British Library in London contain a large number of examples of this craft as does Princeton University.

Other manuscripts are held in Ethiopian monasteries, churches, and private residences. Many of these are stored in suboptimal conditions in which the fragile codices are subject to damage by the elements or by animals. Efforts to document and preserve these manuscripts have been made as part of the Ethio-SPaRe project by the University of Hamburg.

== Modern practice ==
The traditional Ethiopian bookbinding technique is still practiced in monastic centers as a part of the traditional Orthodox Christian culture. It continues to provide a source of income for church fathers and religious students; however the prevalence of the craft is diminishing due to the labor-intensive process and a lack of interest from younger generations.

Many of the tools used in traditional book-binding in Ethiopia have been passed down to modern book-binders from previous generations. New bindings are sometimes stitched with synthetic fibers.
