= Guild of Bookworkers =

Organization which promotes bookbinding

Founded in 1906, the Guild of Book Workers (GBW) is an organization registered in New York City which promotes the craft of bookbinding, conservation, and the Book Arts. Membership in the Guild is common, though not universal, among American bookbinders.

The Guild of Book Workers was created "... to establish and maintain a feeling of kinship and mutual interest among workers in the several hand book crafts." Among its early members are well-known artist-craft workers such as bookbinder Edith Diehl and printers and typographers William Addison Dwiggins and Frederic Goudy.

Our members are dedicated to preserving the traditional crafts of bookmaking while working to increase public appreciation for handbound books and related arts. We aim to encourage commissions for bindings and book-related work, and to promote best practices in book conservation and restoration.

The Guild of Book Workers is governed by an elected group of volunteers who serve as officers, committee chairs and chairs of the regional chapters. In 1978, the Guild became incorporated as a not-for-profit corporation in New York State and is exempt from Federal income tax under section 501 (c) (3) of the Internal Revenue Code.

The GBW holds an annual conference called Standards of Excellence (usually shortened in conversation to "Standards"), during these events, leading bookbinders and conservators deliver lectures and conduct demonstrations designed to share knowledge across the field.

The organization includes 10 regional chapters that carry out the Guildʼs mission by offering similar activities in their local areas. The Chapters produce newsletters, sponsor exhibitions and hold local meetings that feature tours, talks, lectures, demonstrations and workshops.

== See also ==
- Books in the United States
