= Atherton Curtis =

American art historian (1863–1943)

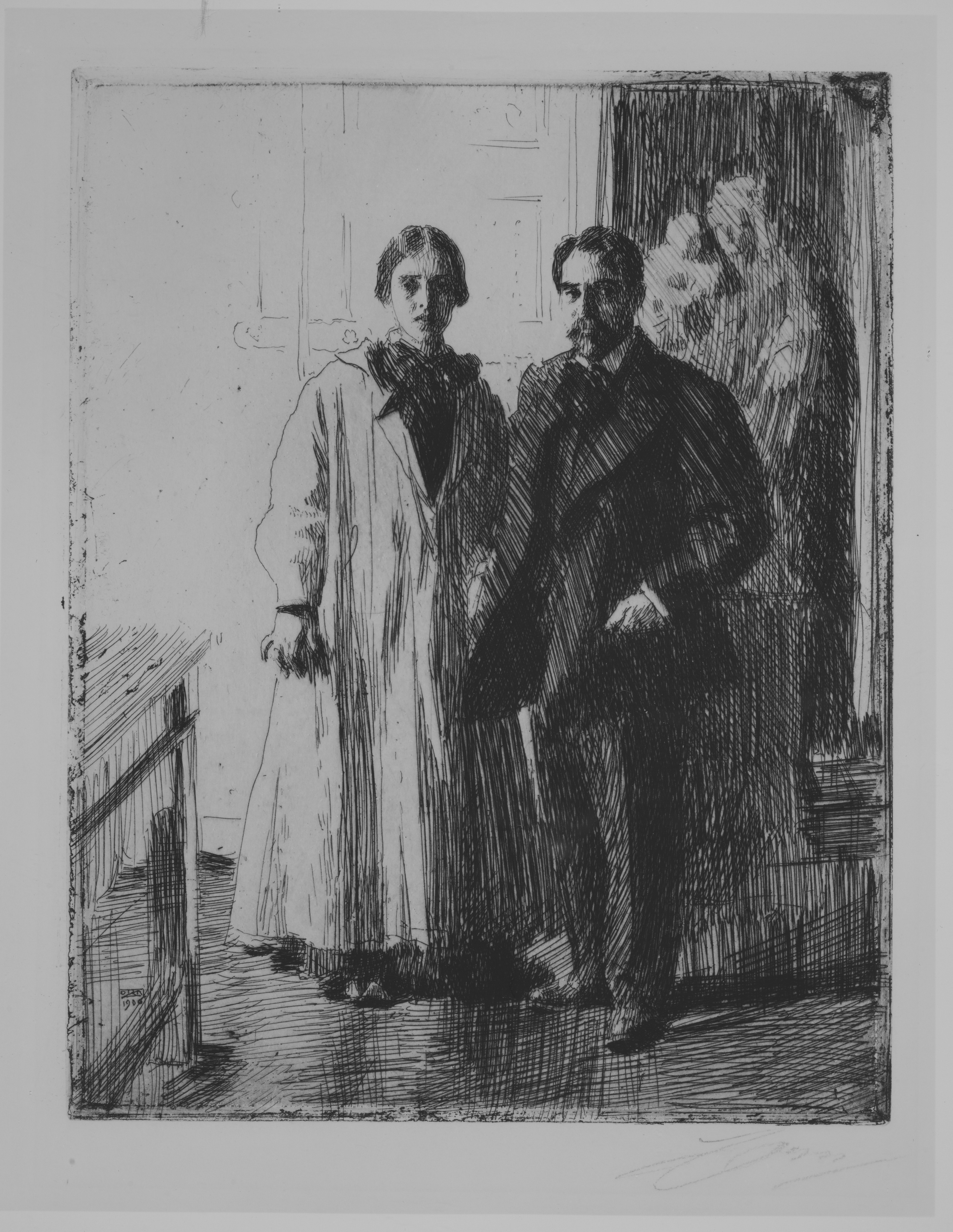
- Atherton and Louise Curtis, 1906.
- Born: April 3, 1863; Brooklyn, New York, United States
- Died: October 8, 1943 (aged 80); Paris, France
- Occupations: Art collector, author, art historian, philanthropist
- Spouse: Louise Burleigh (m. 1869–1910) Ingeborg Flinch (m. 1870–1943)

Atherton M. Curtis (April 3, 1863 – October 8, 1943) was an American art collector and a writer from Brooklyn, New York City, who settled permanently in Paris, France, in 1903. He was also an author of introduction, art historian and publisher, who donated numerous archaeological items to the Louvre and other museums. He was also a principal benefactor of the Humane Society, and is recorded as being a strong supporter for the abolition of vivisection.

== Art collector ==
His father's wealth derived from medicine patents. This provided Curtis with considerable income initially in the form of trust, followed by inheritance allowing him to invest heavily in the arts. He became recognized as a connoisseur of graphic art.

His private collection is exhibited in numerous museums; from the Metropolitan Museum of Art, the Smithsonian Institution, the National Portrait Gallery to the Guimet Museum, the Louvre and the National Library of France. Curtis started his collection at a young age whilst living in New York City. By 1894 he had exhibited his private collection of drawings, watercolors and lithographs by Auguste Raffet, an illustrator in the French Army at the gallery of the Irish art dealer, Frederick Keppel in New York City. During 1896, he acquired his first Japanese prints by Hiroshige.

Curtis relocated temporarily to Paris between 1894 and 1900, returning to the United States in 1900. However, by 1904 he had decided to settle there permanently and arranged to have his cases of prints transported to France where he set up residence in Paris, 17 rue Notre-Dame des Champs. Among several exhibitions, he exhibited his collection of Rembrandts at Mount Kisco, New York, for three months during 1902.

Once he relocated to Paris, he continued to avidly continued to make acquisitions from French merchants, in public sales in France, England and Germany and directly from struggling artists. He continued to collect art for the next 40 years.

Curtis collected during his life an extensive selection of prints, both in number (more than ten thousand works of art), representing a variety of eras, techniques and geographic origins. In order to assemble such an important collection, he often benefited from the advice of Paul Prouté (1887–1981), whose gallery was saved from the recession by the friendly and financial support of Curtis, as a major American collector of prints in the city.

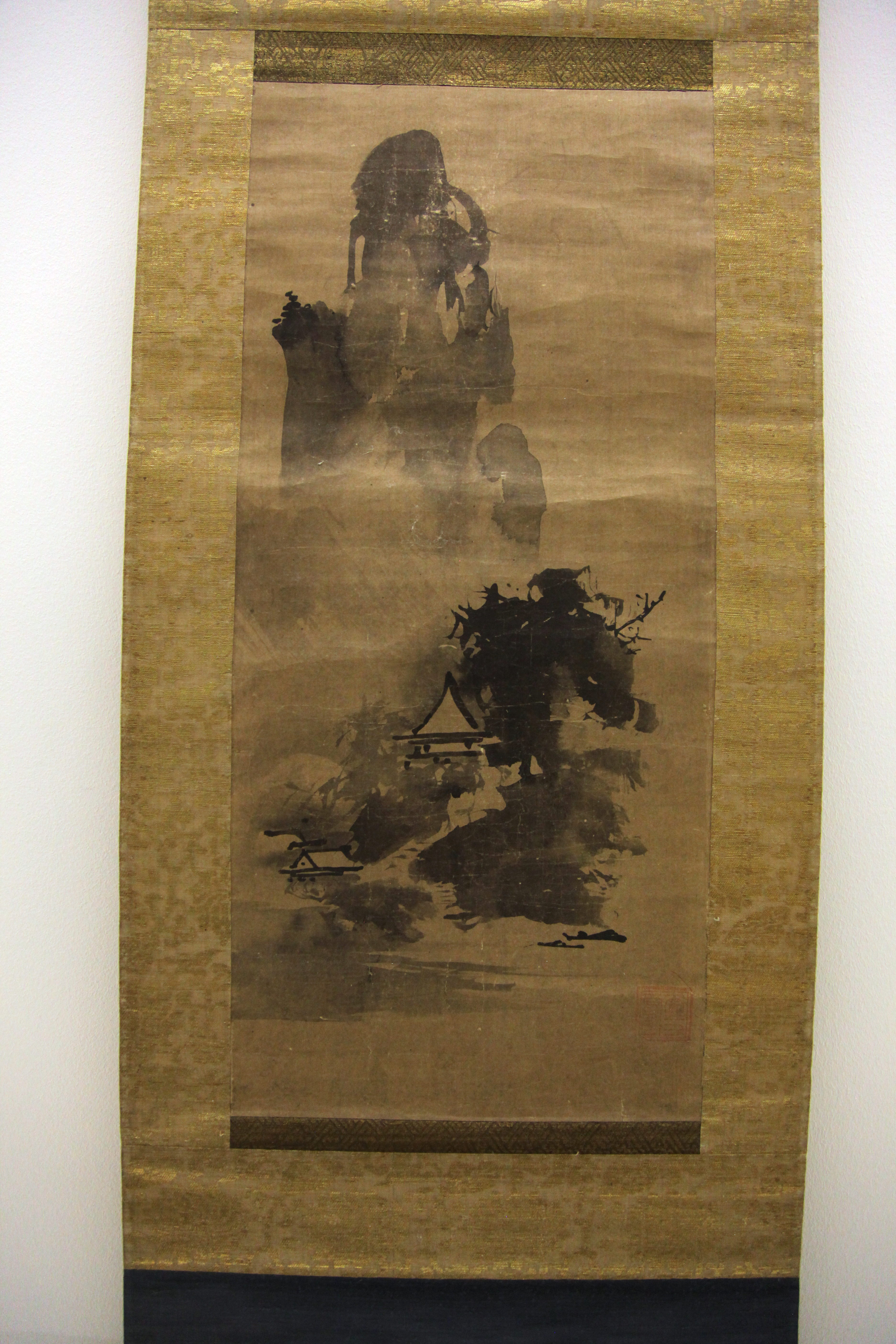
Part of the Atherton Curtis Collection donated in 1938

== Archaeological artifacts ==
He obtained many Egyptian artefacts from the Montague Ballardexcavation in Giza in 1901–1902, which were subsequently bequeathed to a handful of museums in 1938.

== Life in Paris ==
Curtis was an ardent supporter of many contemporary artists during his lifetime, including Henry Ossawa Tanner and Anders Zorn. He met Tanner on December 6, 1897. The artist had lived in Paris since 1891. Curtis became an ardent supporter of his art, as well as a true friend to an artist who had struggled financially, as well as suffered from depression. Such acceptance of friendship Tanner later used the composition of this portrait in a painting of Christ sitting down to dinner with Lazarus and his sister. As an art connoisseur, he wrote for magazines such as The Studio, both the UK and the International edition aimed at the American market. Many of his articles were about illustrators and masters of lithography, such as Adolphe Appian, Amédée Joyau (1872–1913), Charles Meryon, Evert van Muyden, Giovanni Battista Piranesi, Auguste Raffet, Théophile Steinlen and James Abbott McNeill Whistler. Whistler was an American living in Europe who had lived in Stonington (borough), Connecticut as a child, the home of his own grandmother, Clarissa Farnham and great-grandmother Sally Grant.

His personal collection included works from the late artists; Richard Parkes Bonington, Hiroshige, Hokusai and Eugene Isabey.

His fellow wealthy contemporaries included Walter Gay, who was also a notable collector of artworks. Following Gay's death in 1937, his widow donated some 200 works of Dutch, Italian, English and French paintings, drawings and illustrations to the Louvre indicating something of the collection's importance. Curtis and Walter Gay are recorded in the top three foreign nationals who in 1934 were "Friends of the Louvre" and important donors. The other was the philanthropist and future US vice president, Nelson Rockefeller. Curtis, Walter Gay and Nelson Rockefeller were nominated Foreign members of the artistic council of national museum in France after the reform of the council of the RMN in 1934.

Neighbors included Gertrude Stein and Alice Toklas and even during the final years Curtis and his wife had visits from Matisse, Zelda Fitzgerald and F. Scott Fitzgerald.

== Personal ==
He was the son of George N. Curtis, a successful merchant, originally from Bangor, Maine, who moved his business to New York in 1854. The family wealth was derived from patent medicine such as Mrs. Winslow's Soothing Syrup. Neither Curtis nor his younger brother George Warrington Curtis, appear to have shown any interest in entering the family business, instead focusing on the arts and foreign travel, having been introduced to transatlantic voyages to Europe at a young age, by their father and mother, Eliza. Both brothers aspired to be artists.

On August 14, 1894, Curtis married Louise Burleigh (1869–1910) in Geneva, Switzerland. His wife was from Maine, as his parents. Both had already been living in Paris prior to their marriage. They moved to the 5 rue Buissonière, in Paris after the wedding. His father died while in Paris two years later.

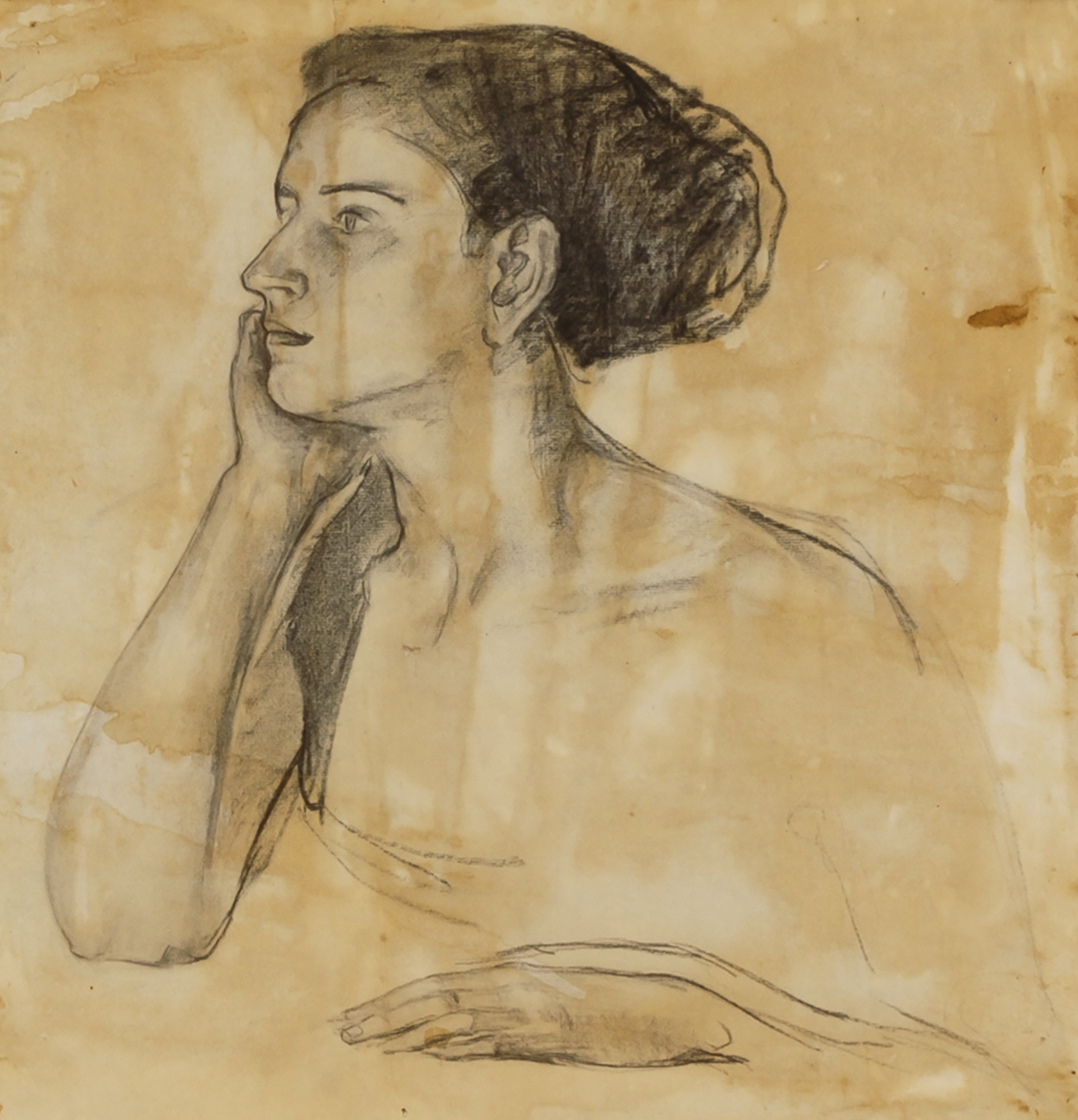
Louise Burleigh Curtis by Henry Ossawa Tanner (circa 1897–1902)

Curtis and his first wife, Louise formed an extensive art collection. She was an artist-draftsman and a pupil of Raphaël Collin and Luc-Olivier Merson. They set up a commune for artists at Mount Kisco, New York, in November 1900.

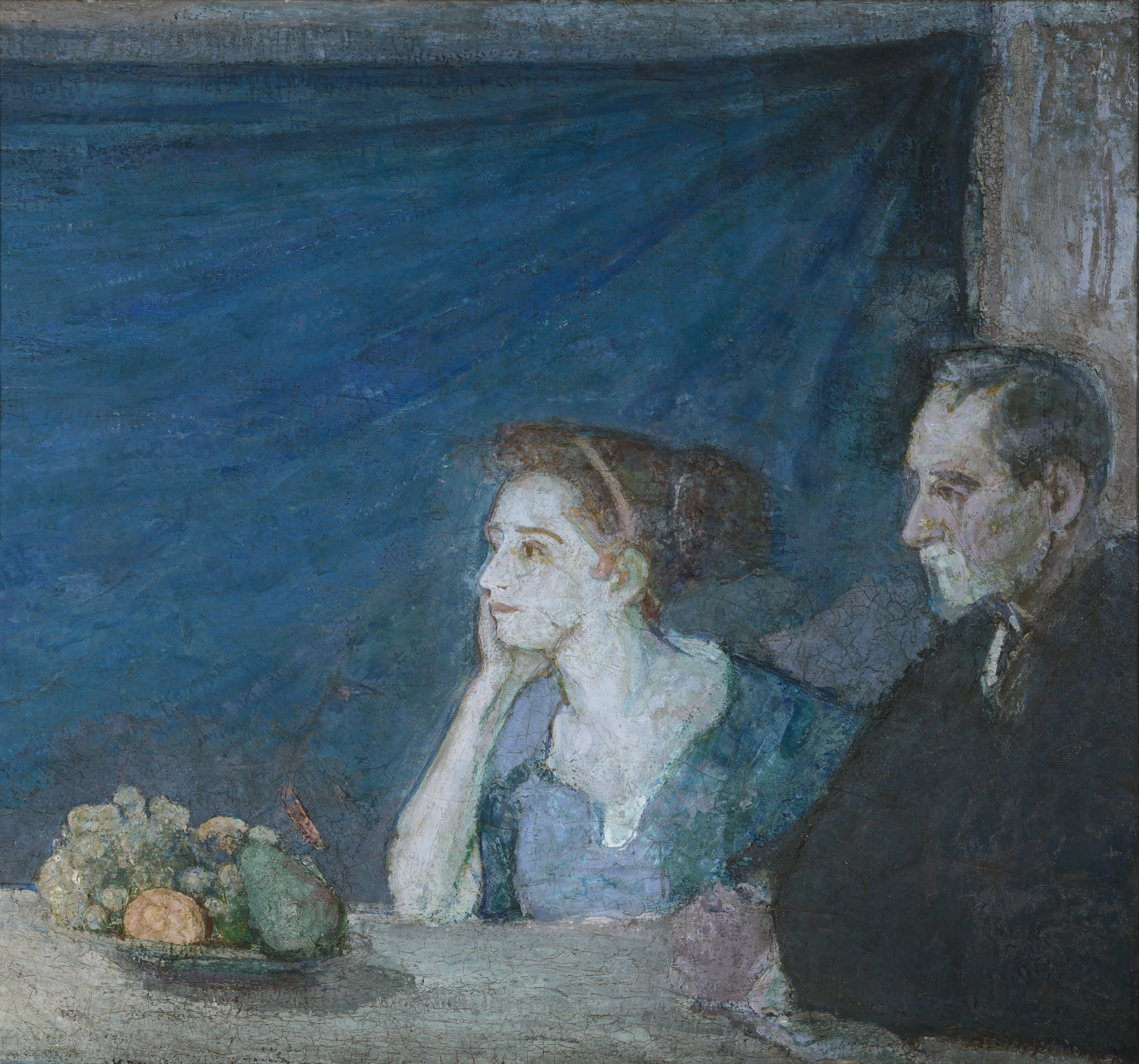
Curtis with his first wife L B Curtis by Henry Ossawa Tanner (1859–1937)

Curtis was widowed in 1910. His second wife was Ingeborg Flinch (1870–1943), originally from Copenhagen, Denmark, who had been a close friend of his first wife and their administrator. He had a retreat in Bourron-Marlotte, a town that was frequented by several impressionist painters, including Alfred Sisley, Pierre-Auguste Renoir and Paul Cézanne. Like his first wife, she was completely devoted to his cause as a collector. This retreat is also mentioned in a letter in 1937 to Tanner's son, where he describes the a painting of the pyramids on the edge of the desert being the very first picture he bought from H. O. Tanner.

Curtis died of old age on October 8, 1943, at his home, 17 rue Notre-Dame-des-Champs, in German-occupied Paris. His second wife, Ingeborg, followed him two days after suffering from heart trouble. Both deaths were notified to the Swiss Embassy who provided a consular service for American citizens at that time by a French friend, Marguerite, the wife of SOE agent, Mario Prassinos. They were both cremated and their ashes deposited at the Père Lachaise Cemetery. Some of his ashes were scattered in Vevey, Switzerland, to be close to his first wife, Louise.

He was a relative of John B. Curtis, who created "State of Maine Pure Spruce Gum" in 1848.

== Legacy ==
In 1938 Curtis donated works to the Cluny Museum, his Egyptian collection of archeological items and parts of his Asian art collection to the Louvre. The following year he promised to bequeath a selection to the Bibliothèque nationale de France, including eight hundred Japanese prints, more than a thousand Chinese artefacts, and almost seven thousand occidental prints. Further parts of his collection were donated in his will in 1943.

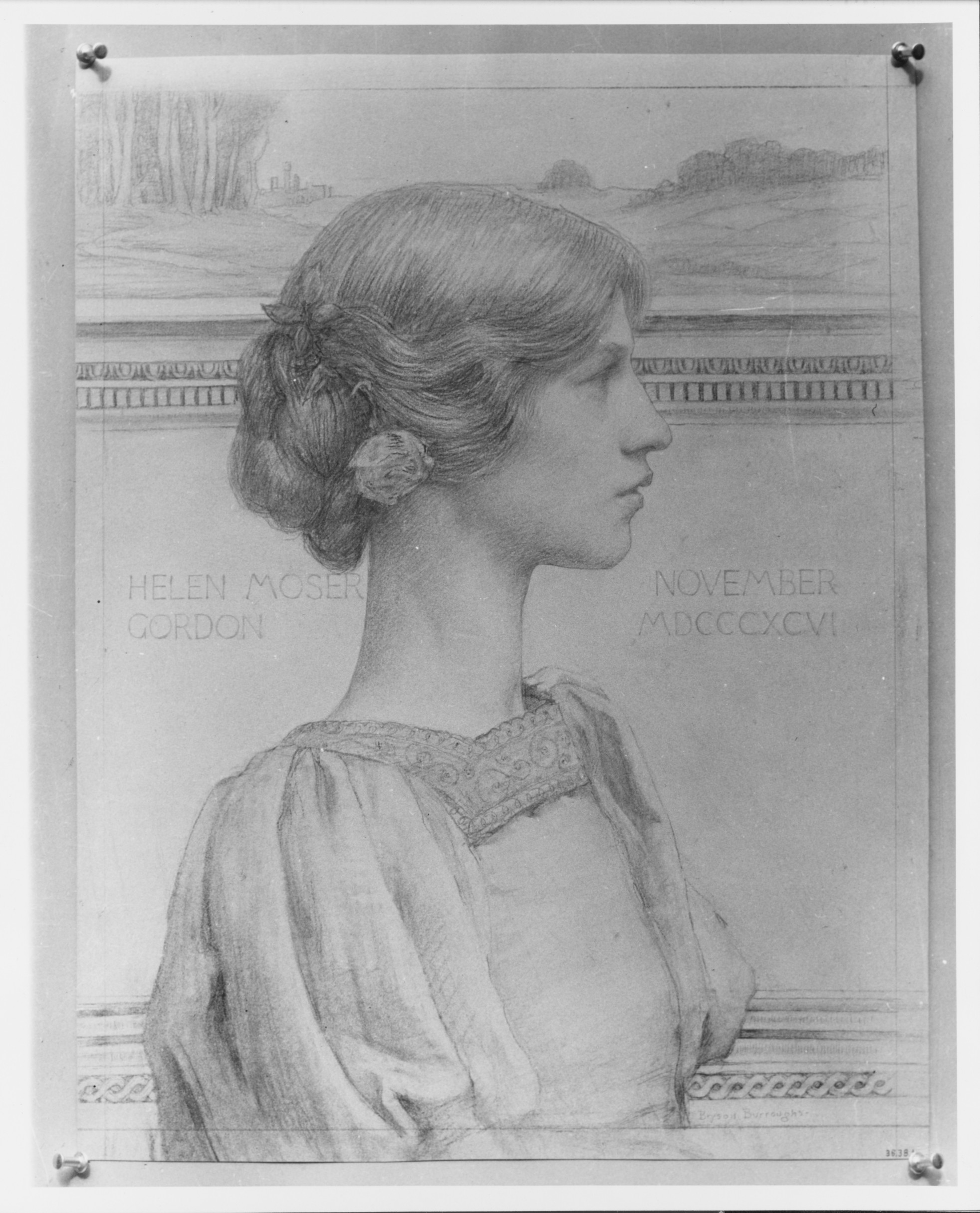
Mrs. Helen Moser Gordon, later Mrs. Ivanowski - drawing by Bryson Burroughs donated by Curtis to the MET in 1936

His correspondence with Tanner between 1904 and 1937 is held at the Smithsonian Institution. The Tanner Collection contains a number of photos of Curtis and his family.

A great deal of his collection was sold in Bern, Switzerland after World War II. This included etchings from the 1500 to the 1800s and handbooks of graphics by Albrecht Dürer, Anthony van Dyck, Rembrandt, Martin Schongauer, as well as copperplate engravings, and woodcuts from the same period from both Dutch, Italian and French schools.

The Ryerson & Burnham Libraries of Chicago hold over 2000 items relating to Curtis, including catalogues of his collection, books, publications as well as personal correspondence.

The National Library of France hold the print collection bequeathed in 1943 by Atherton Curtis and his wife, along with a catalogue of this collection and three diaries of Curtis (covering 1894–1943). Parts of the collection are viewable online on the catalogue of the National Library of France.

== Published works ==
- Curtis, Atherton (1897). Some Masters of Lithography. D. Appleton.
- Curtis, Atherton (1900). Animal Protection in France, edited by Henry Stephens Salt
- Curtis, Atherton (1903). Auguste Raffet. New York: Frederick Keppel & Co.
- Curtis, Atherton (1910) Curtis, Atherton. How Prints are Made.
- Curtis, Atherton (1939). Catalog of the lithographed and engraved work of Richard Parkes Bonington, Paris

== Biography ==
- Paris 1951: The Curtis Collection. Prints and drawings by masters, bequeathed to the Bibliothèque Nationale by the great American amateur, by J. Prinet. Foreword by J. Cain and J. Vallery-Radot, Paris, Bibliothèque Nationale, 1951.
- G. Wildenstein, "The enrichments of the National Library", Gazette des Beaux-Arts, April 1960, no 1095, pp. 1–3, spec. p. 1.
- L. Beaumont-Maillet, collection Collectors at the Cabinet des Estampes, Nouvelles de l'Estampe, December 1993, no 132, pp. 5–27, no 48.
- P. Juhel, Public sales of prints in Paris under the Third Republic. Directory of catalogs (1870–1914), Paris 2016, no 1,549.
