= William Edwin Rudge =

Printer, 1876–1931 (1876–1931)

William Edwin Rudge is the name of a grandfather, father and son, all of whom worked in the printing business. It's also the name of their business.

The first William Edwin Rudge (1835–1910) operated a small commercial print shop in New York City.

William Edwin Rudge II (1876–1931) was born in Brooklyn, N.Y. He went to work at age 13 at his father's print shop and in 1899 took it over due to his father's ill health. In 1920 he entered over a hundred works in the National Arts Club Exhibition of that year. Of the thirty-nine medals awarded, his firm won six, with designs commissioned from Frederic W. Goudy, Bruce Rogers, and Elmer Adler.

In January 1921 the plant was moved to Mount Vernon, N.Y. For the next ten years some of the finest printing being produced in America issued from its presses, dominated by Bruce Rogers, who designed eighty books for the firm up to 1931. Frederic Warde also worked for Rudge for two periods.

== Remembrances of Rudge (1876–1931) ==
- A Short Story About A Printer Who Dares To Maintain A Standard Of His Own. Published in 1928, Advertisers Paper Mills (Holyoke, Mass); Contributions: Shapiro Bruce Rogers Collection (Library of Congress) Other titles: Trail blazer of Mount Vernon. Library of Congress: LCCN: 2001560175 LC: Z232.R89 S56 1928
- Frederick Pottle Remembers William Edwin Rudge by Frederick Albert Pottle; Published in 1981, The Typophiles ([New York, N.Y) Library of Congress: LCCN: 98126474 LC: Portfolio 339, no. 16
- William Edwin Rudge by William J. Glick; Published in 1984, Typophiles (New York); Library of Congress: LCCN: 85127324 Dewey: 686.2/092/4, B LC: Z232.R89 G55 1984

== William Edwin Rudge III (1908–1989) ==
William Edwin Rudge III (who went by Edwin) learned about printing working for his father. After the father's death, he and his brother Fred Rudge ran the print shop as "William E. Rudge’s Sons, Inc." until 1945. He founded Print, A Quarterly Journal of the Graphic Arts in 1940. In 1942, he bought the Elm Tree Press (established since 1907) from Edward C. Dana and settled his business in Woodstock, Vermont. In 1946 he purchased the journal The Print Collector's Quarterly, restarting publication in 1948, then absorbed it into Print in 1951. In 1946, Robert L. Dothard and Frank H. Teagle joined Rudge in Woodstock and the fine printing work continued. In 1950 the Elm Tree Press filed for bankruptcy.

During the 1950s, Rudge worked as an agent for the Lane Press.

William Edwin Rudge III married Abigail Hazen in 1934. They had a daughter, Joanna Rudge, and a son, William Edwin Rudge IV.

There are William Edwin Rudge papers in the libraries of the University of California, Santa Barbara and the University of Vermont.

== Select publications ==
- 1921 Slater, John Rothwell. Printing And The Renaissance, A Paper Read Before The Fortnightly Club Of Rochester, New York. New York – published by William Edwin Rudge. As per Oak Knoll Books: First edition, limited to 600 copies. Designed by Bruce Rogers (Warde 149).
- 1925 Adams, Elbridge. Joseph Conrad: The Man. A Burial In Kent By John Sheridan Zelie. Together With Some Bibliographical Notes. New York – published by William Edwin Rudge. As per Oak Knoll Books: First edition, limited to 485 copies. Designed by Bruce Rogers. (Warde no.190). With an engraved portrait of Joseph Conrad by Muirhead Bone as frontispiece.
- 1926 Moore, George. Peronnik The Fool. Mount Vernon – published by William Edwin Rudge. As per Oak Knoll Books: Limited to 785 copies printed by William Edwin Rudge Press. (Warde 130). Designed by Bruce Rogers.
- 1928 Waldman, Milton. America Conquers Death - published by New York William Edwin Rudge Limited to 500 copies. (Agner 28.12).
- 1928 Howell, James. Certain Letters Of James Howell Selected From The Familiar Letters As First Published Between 1645 & 1655 New York - published by William Edwin Rudge. As per Oak Knoll Books: Limited to 1000 copies. Completed as a course project for a course taught by Frederic Goudy with typography suggested by him and binding by Edith Diehl. Introduction by Guy Holt.
- 1930 Lamb, Charles. New Year's Eve. New York published by William Edwin Rudge. As per Oak Knoll Books: one of Charles Lamb's best-known "Elia" essays, a meditation on nostalgia and the passing of time.
- 1930 Hunter, Dard Papermaking through Eighteen Centuries. New York: William Edwin Rudge.
- 1932 Kennard, Joseph Spencer. The Italian Theatre - New York published by William Edwin Rudge. As per Oak Knoll Books: First edition. The first continuous and complete history of Italian Theatre in any language. All of the theatres of Europe originated in the Italian Theatre and for 1500 years it was the only theatre in Europe. Some of the areas covered are the Christian Church and the Mediaeval Theatre, the Italian Renaissance, Metastasio's life, some contemporary Italian dramatists and more. It includes numerous illustrations which are chiefly from contemporary sources.
- 1933 - Goodrich, Lloyd. Thomas Eakins: His Life and Works published under the name William Edwin Rudge Printing House. New York City.
- 1940 - Print, A Quarterly Journal of the Graphic Arts published under the name William Edwin Rudge, Publisher, Inc. Woodstock, Vermont.
- 1946 - acquired The Print Collector’s Quarterly and later merged it with Print, A Quarterly Journal of the Graphic Arts.
- 1947 Guggenheim, Siegfried. Rudolf Koch, His Work And The Offenbach Workshop - Woodstock, VT - published by William Edwin Rudge . As per Oak Knoll Books: with a tipped-in frontispiece portrait of Rudolf Koch followed by Guggenheim's article and one by Sven Jansen on his typefaces. Also includes a list of references about Koch.

== See also ==
- List of publishers

"A Brief Account of the Life and Work of William Edwin Rudge" by Melvin Loos, a two-part post at Typocurious, which first appeared in print as a keepsake supplied by Gallery 303 to the participants in the Heritage of the Graphic Arts series in attendance at Melvin Loos’s presentation on 16 December 1965.
