= Charles Jacque =

French painter

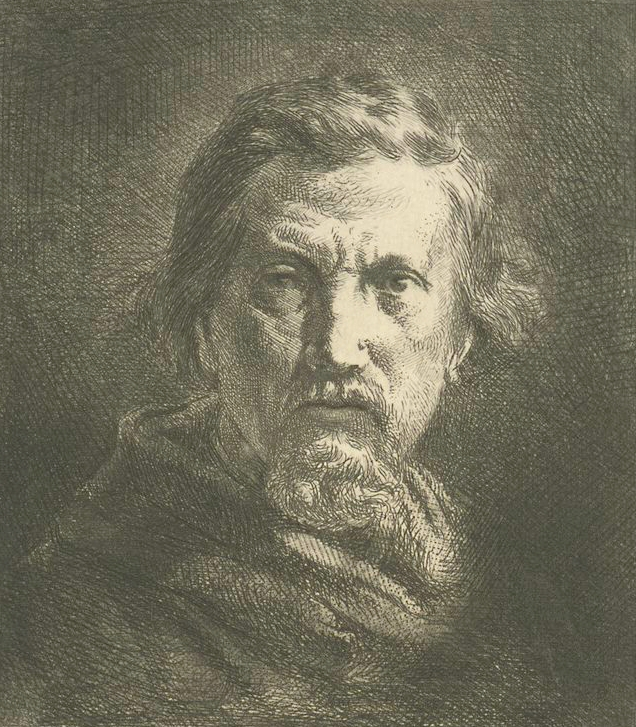
- Self-portrait, 1862
- Born: 23 May 1813
- Died: 7 May 1894 (aged 80)

Charles-Émile Jacque (23 May 1813 – 7 May 1894) was a French painter of Pastoralism and engraver who was, with Jean-François Millet, part of the Barbizon School. He first learned to engrave maps when he spent seven years in the French Army.

== Biography ==
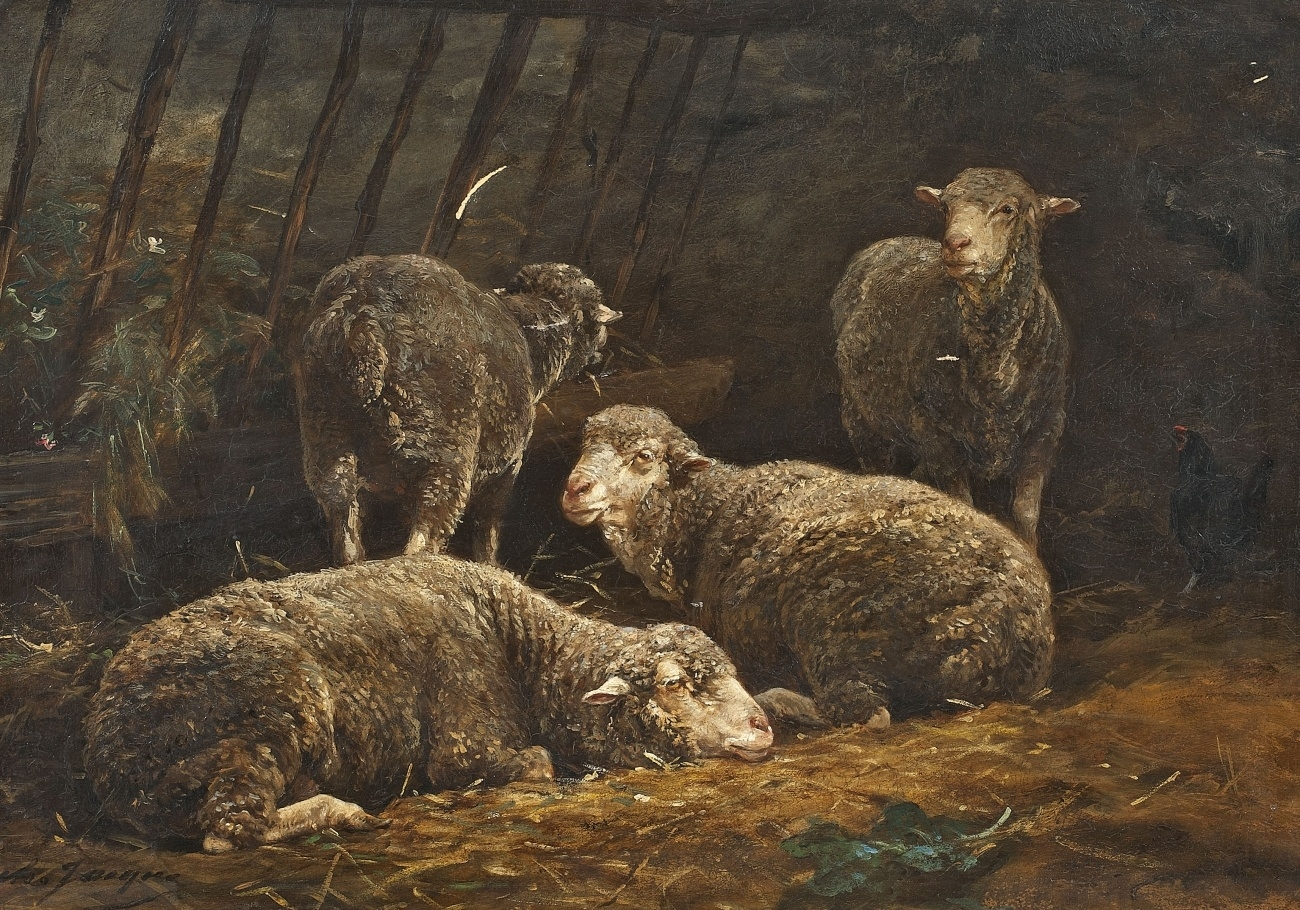
Sheep in stall

Fleeing the Cholera epidemics that besieged Paris in the mid-nineteenth century, Charles Jacque relocated to Barbizon in 1849 with Millet. There, he painted rustic or pastoral subject matter: shepherds, flocks of sheep, pigs, and scenes of farm life. In addition to painting, Jacque was also famous for his etchings and engravings. He, along with Félix Bracquemond and Felix Buhot, is credited with the nineteenth-century revival of seventeenth-century techniques. He began his career as an engraver around 1841 by publishing a series of etchings with Louis Marvy. He followed this work with a series of engravings based on the works of Adriaen van Ostade, after which he began to create original engravings and artworks. Charles Baudelaire said of him, "Mr. Jacque’s new reputation will continue to grow always, we hope. His etchings are very bold and his subject matter is well conceived. All that Mr. Jacque does on copper is filled with a freedom and a frankness which reminds one of the Old Masters."

Henri Béraldi distinguished two periods in Jacque's career. The first saw his creation of more spontaneous, Dutch inspired vignettes. In the second, for which he is more famous, he produced larger plates which, according to Fanica, were "marked by the Dutch character of his work".

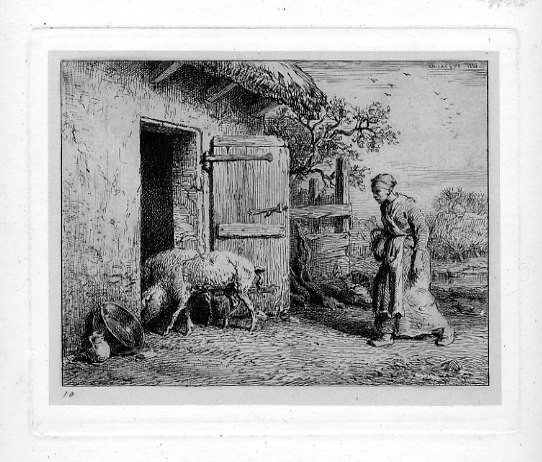
Etching (1848)

Jacque also provided the illustrations for numerous books, in particular the Vicar of Wakefield by Oliver Goldsmith; The Indian Cottage, a novella published with Paul et Virginie; Picturesque Greece by Christopher Wordsworth; the Works of Shakespeare; and Ancient and Modern Versailles by Alexandre de Laborde.

== Family ==
His sons Émile Jacque (1848–1912) and Frédéric Jacque (1859–1931) were both painters and engravers especially of rural subjects. Another son, Lucien, was executed as a Communard during the French State's bloody repression of the Paris Commune.

== Gallery ==
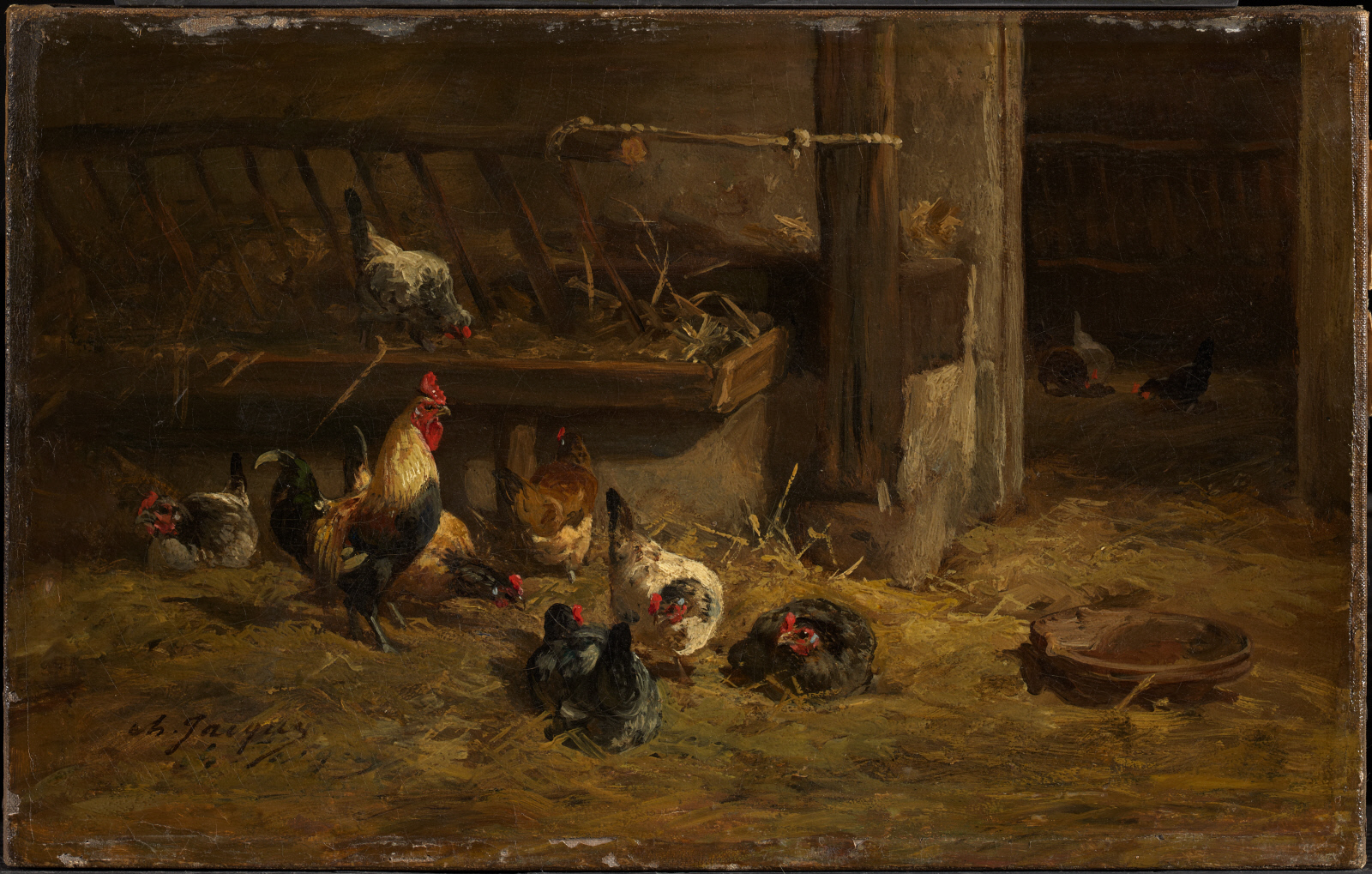
Poultry, c. 1855–60, Clark Art Institute, Williamstown

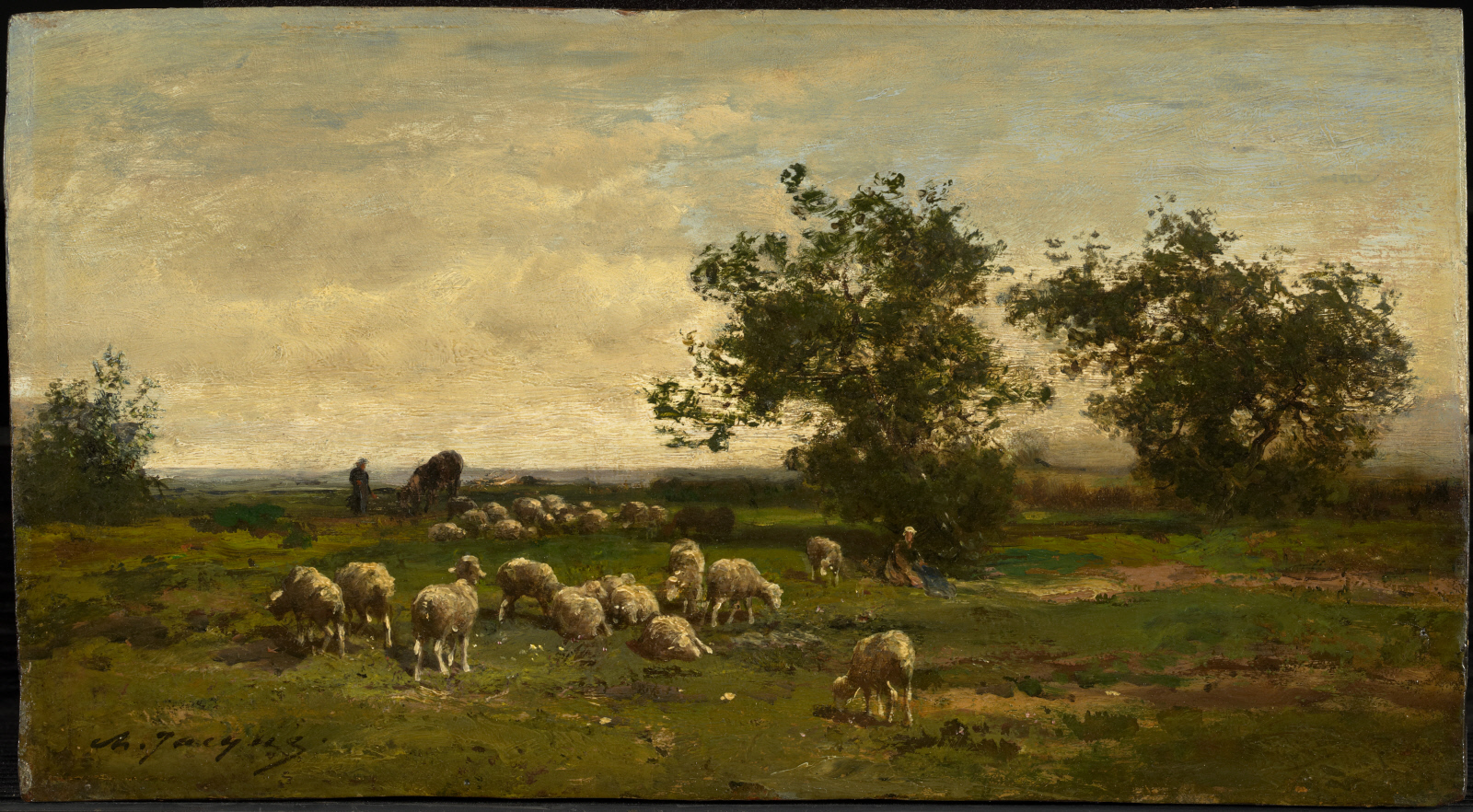
Landscape with Sheep, c. 1855–94, Clark Art Institute, Williamstown

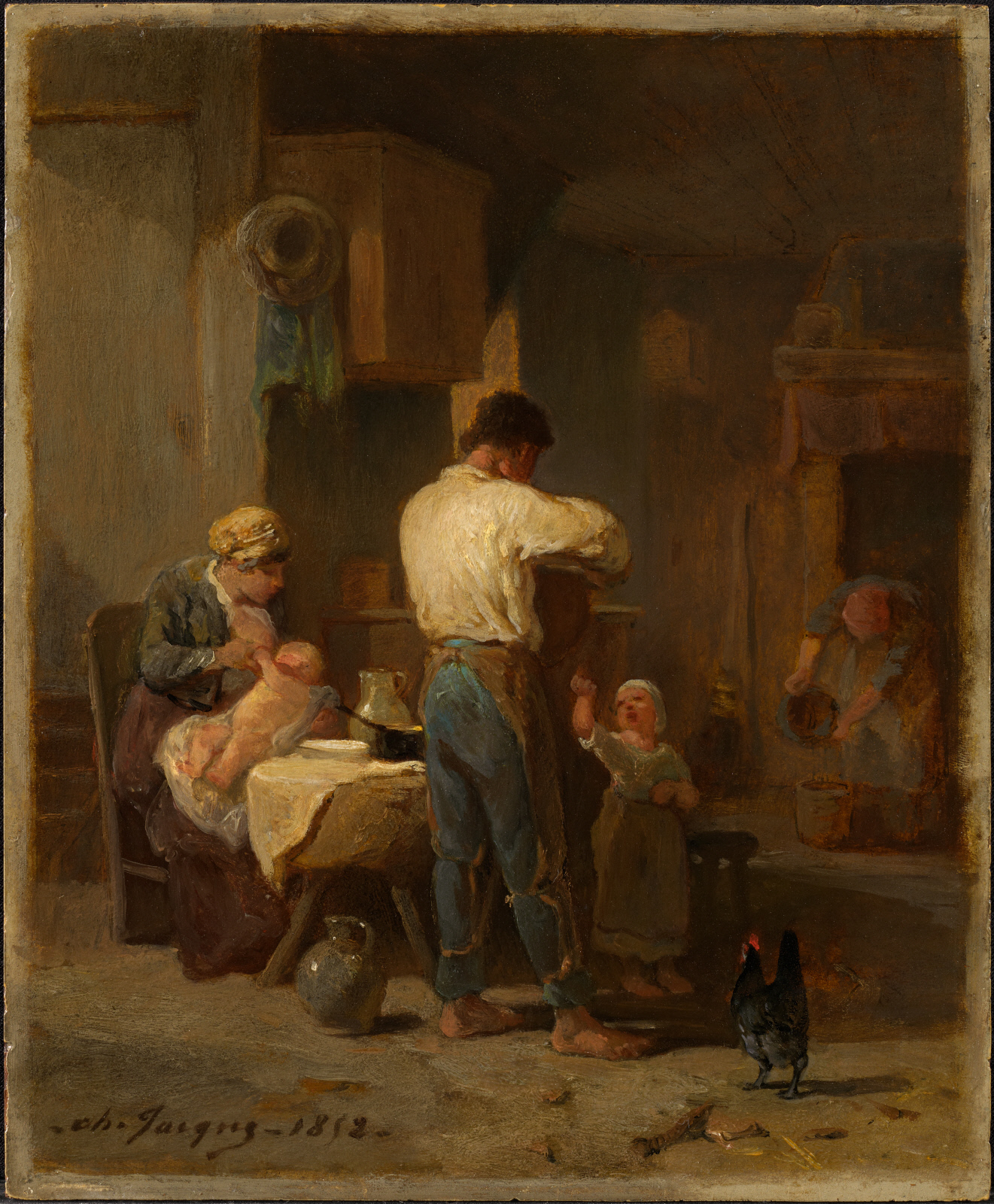
Interior, 1852, Clark Art Institute, Williamstown

== Bibliography ==
- Pierre-Olivier Fanica, Charles Jacque, 1813-1894: École de Barbizon : graveur original et peintre animalier (Montigny-sur-Loing: Art Bizon, 1995) In French. ISBN 2-9509265-0-9
