= Frederick Keppel (art dealer) =

American art dealer, scholar and writer

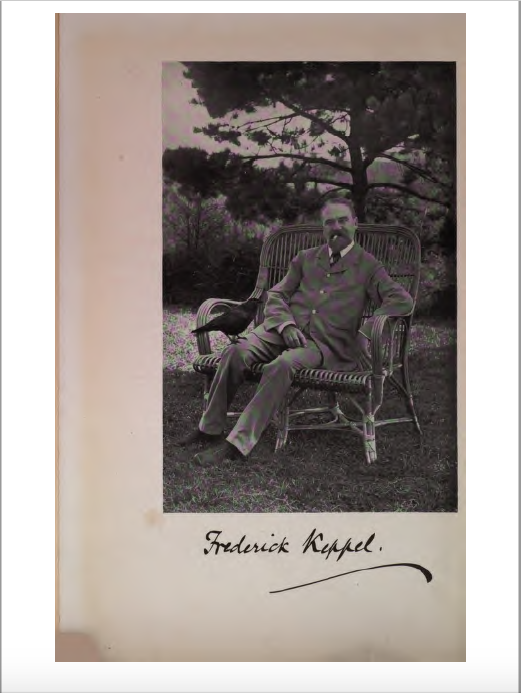
- Born: March 22, 1845; Tullow
- Died: March 7, 1912; New York City
- Occupation: Art dealer
- Children: Frederick Paul Keppel

Frederick Keppel (1845–1912) was an American art dealer, scholar, writer, owner and founder of Frederick Keppel & Company. Keppel came to America in 1864 and became a print dealer in 1868. He was a patron and promoter of the Etching Revival and etchers including Whistler, Zorn, Buhot and Pennell. He gave Félix-Hilaire Buhot his first one-man show in 1888, and about the same time started to buy and sell a large number of Whistler's prints.

== Early life ==
Keppel was born in Tullow in County Carlow in Ireland in 1845. Keppel was educated at Wesley College in Dublin. His family left Ireland when he was a teenager, going first to Ontario, ultimately settling in New York in 1864. He began his career as a bookseller. He became interested in prints after being introduced to John S. Philips, a major Philadelphia collector of European prints and drawings.

== Frederick Keppel & Company ==
Keppel established his firm, Frederick Keppel & Company at 20 E 16th Street in 1868. There he sold etchings and engravings by the Old Masters and works by Modern artists, such as Jean-François Millet, Félix Buhot, James McNeil Whistler, Edith Loring Getchell and Joseph Pennell. In 1905, Keppel & Company moved uptown to 4 E. 39th Street. The firm moved again in the 1920s to 16 E. 57th Street. Keppel was known throughout his career for his personal relationships with artists. His friendships with artists such as James McNeil Whistler and Jean-François Millet. Keppel sold prints to major New York collectors such as Samuel P. Avery, Atherton Curtis and Mary Jane Morgan. After his death in 1912, Keppel's son David Keppel (1877–1956) inherited the business, acting as its president until 1940. In 1940, Keppel & Co. merged with Arthur Harlow & Co. to form Harlow, Keppel & Co. located at 670 5th Avenue.

== Legacy ==
William Macbeth started his career at Frederick Keppel & Co., eventually becoming a partner. He left in 1892 to establish the Macbeth Gallery, which specialized in American Art. Carl Zigrosser, who became the Philadelphia Museum of Art Curator of Drawings, was first employed by Frederick Keppel & Co.

== Scholarship ==
Keppel published essays in exhibition catalogs and gave lectures on the topic of prints and print collecting. Keppel was also the author of several works on etching. In 1886 he published American etchers. Reprinted from the Century Magazine for February, 1883, with a brief additional chapter reprinted in part from the New York Star, by Mrs. Schuyler Van Rensselaer. To which is added an account of Méryon and his work, by Frederick Keppel, New York 1886. In the following year he translated Alfred Lebrun's catalogue of the etchings, heliographs, lithographs, and woodcuts done by Jean François Millet, New York 1887. He wrote Modern Disciples of Rembrandt, A Sketch of Contemporary Etching, New York, 1890. Exhibitions of Whistler's work included catalogue of an exhibition of etchings and drypoints by Whistler, New York 1907. In 1910 many of his articles and lectures were compiled into his book: The Golden Age of Engraving: A Specialists Story about Fine Prints. He wrote articles and pamphlets to accompany exhibitions at his gallery, and often gave lectures on subjects related to prints. Keppel co-founded the Print Collector’s Quarterly in 1911, a publication devoted entirely to the subject of print collecting. He was involved in the Etching Revival movement.
