= Félix Buhot =

French painter and illustrator

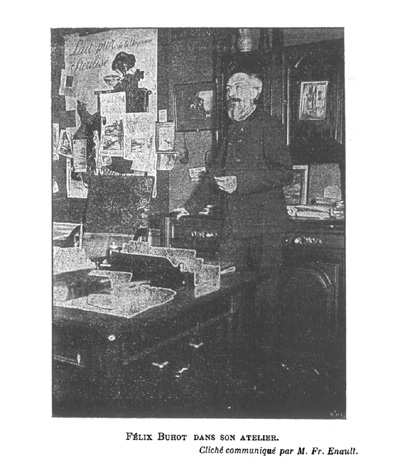
Félix Buhot in his studio.

Félix Hilaire Buhot (French: [feliks byo]; July 9, 1847 – April 26, 1898) was a French painter and illustrator.

== Biography ==
Félix Buhot is the son of Florentin Louis Buhot and of Anne Appoline Buhot, born Jobelin.

With his wife Henriette Johnston, they are the parents of the French painter Jean Buhot.

Among the most original prints made in France during the last quarter of the nineteenth century are those by Félix Buhot. Along with artists like Charles Jacque, Louis Monziès and Félix Bracquemond, he is credited with reviving seventeenth-century etching techniques in late nineteenth-century art.

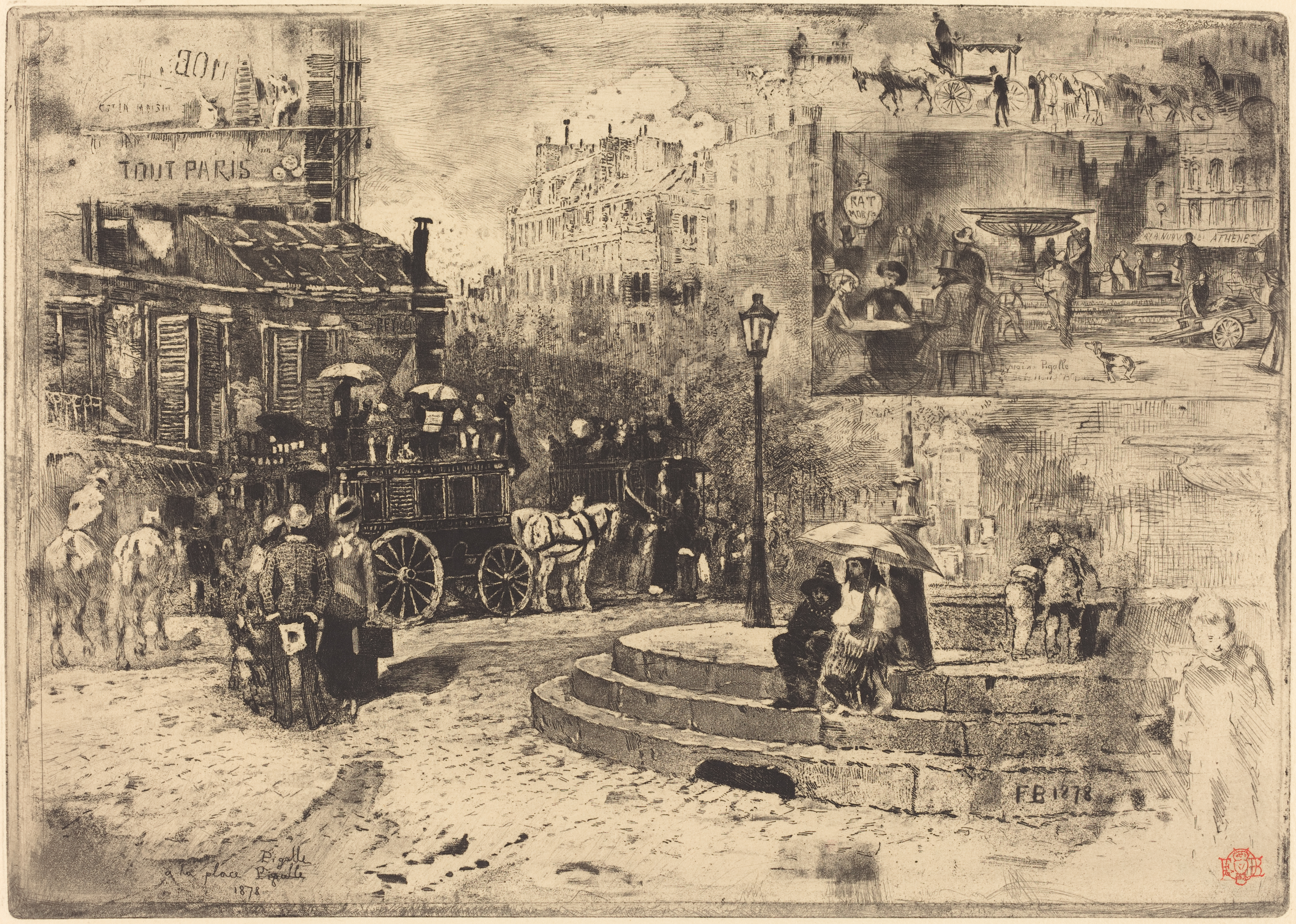
La place Pigalle en 1878 (1878), etching, aquatint and drypoint, New York Public Library.

In his many prints of city views and seascapes, Buhot was intent on creating a specific atmosphere, especially the effects of weather such as rain, snow, mist, and fog. He turned to his immediate neighborhood in and around the boulevard de Clichy in Montmartre, Paris, for inspiration for his prints of everyday city life. Buhot delighted in portraying the varied street life of the vibrant capital city not only in different seasons (Winter in Paris, 1879) but also in moments of public display, from a festive holiday celebration (National Holiday on the Boulevard de Clichy, 1878) to a somber death observance (Funeral Procession on the Boulevard de Clichy, 1887). His city views also include London scenes (Westminster Palace and Westminster Bridge, both of 1884). And Buhot's love for the sea is evidenced in the many prints exploring its ever-changing atmospheric conditions and moods. Buhot's boat trips to England inspired two of his most characteristic prints, A Pier in England and Landing in England, both from 1879.

With his experimental printmaking techniques, Buhot became one of the best-known, admired, and collected printmakers of his day. He achieved success for his prints at the annual Salons between 1875 and 1886, and a number of his works were published in leading periodicals and books. He also found critical acclaim and support for his prints in the United States, especially after his first one-man exhibition organized by the New York print dealer Frederick Keppel in 1888.

On February 15, 1888, he made an exhibition in New York City.

He died in 1898.

== Bibliography ==
- J.-L. ADAM, Notice sur la vie et l'œuvre de Félix Buhot, Évreux, impr. de l'Eure, 1900
- Bourcard, Catalogue descriptif de l'œuvre gravé de Buhot, Paris, Floury, 1899
- J.-L. Dufresne, V. Sueur, A. Mc Queen, Félix Buhot. Peintre graveur entre Romantisme et impressionnisme. 1847-1898, Cherbourg, Isoète, 1998
- Pierre Leberruyer, Le Peintre graveur aquafortiste Félix Buhot (1847–1898), [?]: Editions Manche-Tourisme. 1979, 119 p.
- Léonce Bénédite, Félix Buhot : Étude biographique et critique, suivie du catalogue de l'œuvre gravé de cet artiste exposé au Musée du Luxembourg, Paris, Librairie de l'Art ancien et moderne, (1902). 24 p., fig. et pl. Extrait de la Revue de l'art ancien et moderne.
- [The] late Félix Buhot, painter-etcher, New York, F. Keppel, [1910?]. 37 p., ill.
- Roger-Marx Claude (1962) La Gravure originale au XIV siecle, Paris, Somogy. pp. 152–154.
