= Evelyn Hunter Nordhoff =

American bookbinder (1865–1898)

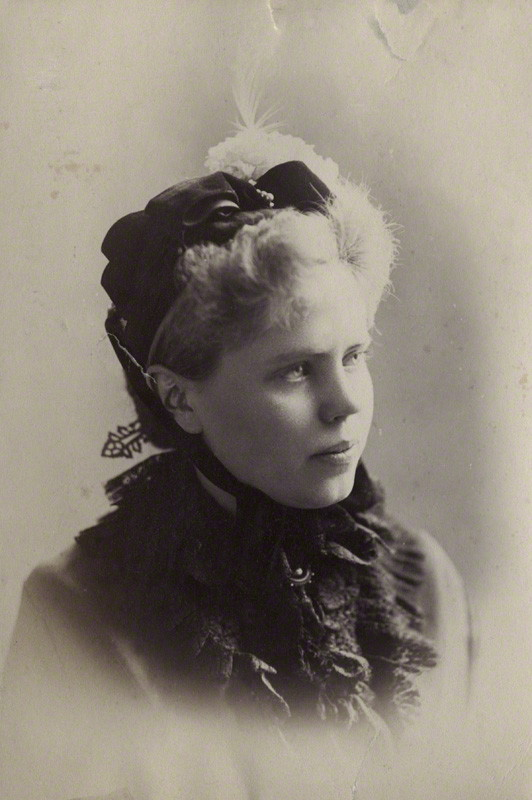
- Nordhoff in 1884
- Born: c. 1865
- Died: November 2, 1898 (aged 34); New York

Evelyn Hunter Nordhoff (b. ca. 1865 – d. November 2, 1898) was America's first female bookbinder and printmaker.

== Biography ==
Evelyn Hunter Nordhoff was the daughter of Charles Nordhoff and studied design with May Morris, the daughter of William Morris. She started bookbinding when she heard T. J. Cobden-Sanderson lecture on bookbinding. She was determined to learn how to bind them and eventually learned the trade from Cobden-Sanderson at the Doves Press bindery in London in 1899, as well as Léon Gruel of the Rue Royale St. Honoré in Paris. She studied at the Doves Press circa 1895 onwards and came back to America to teach others the art. Her New York City studio, the Elephant Bindery, was located at 39 Washington Square West, where she gave lectures on bookbinding and exhibited her own work.

When touring binderies in New York where women were employed, many did not have comprehensive education in the trade. So Nordhoff established the first school, Nordhoff Bindery, in the country to teach women the skills of bookbinding. She felt the work was well suited for one who had a home and family to help support her while in training. Women going into the occupation must love the work and be determined to learn with patience to execute fine and delicate work. Once basic skills were learned, a woman ought to be as proficient as her male colleagues.

Nordhoff died unexpectedly on November 2, 1898, at the age of 34, after a brief illness. The work of this studio was continued by her students, M. Prat and Florence Foote, after her death, and is to be distinguished from the eventually renamed Evelyn Nordhoff Bindery at another location. Her New York Times obituary quotes her as stating "I want it distinctly understood that I am not a new woman. I belong to the old-fashioned class. Only I believe that if a woman wants to do a thing, she should be allowed the liberty of doing it.”

== Notable works ==
Evelyn Nordhoff was the only woman bookbinder included in a Grolier Club exhibition on American bookbindings that ran from April 10–24, 1897; eight of her bookbindings were exhibited. As a writer, she wrote a vivid description about the life and work habits at the Doves Press and Bindery for The Chap-Book. Some works on paper by Nordhoff are held at the National Museum of Women in the Arts.

== Students ==
- Florence Foote
- May Rosina Prat and Minnie Prat, Primrose Bindery

== Family ==
She was the sister of Walter Nordhoff (1855-1937), author of The Journey of the Flame, penned under the name "Antonio de Fierro Blanco".
