= The Print Collector's Quarterly =

The Print Collector's Quarterly (initially hyphenated as The Print-Collector's Quarterly), was a quarterly periodical that was begun in 1911 and continued under various publishers until 1950. The original founders were art dealer Frederick Keppel and print historian, Fitzroy Carrington.

The Print Collector's Newsletter 1978 vol 9, p. 22 stated, "The Print Collector's Quarterly summed up the taste and concerns of many American and British print collectors of the first four decades of our (ie the 20th) century."

The publication is described as "A profusely illustrated journal containing catalogue raisonné and articles by recognized authorities on individual artists." in A Guide to the Literature of Art History by Arntzen, E. & Rainwater, R. Publisher: American Library Association, Chicago, 1980 (Chamberlin 2315; Arntzen/Rainwater Q 281.)

== Hyphenated Name ==
- Until Volume 8 (1921) the periodical was published with a hyphenated name (The Print-Collector's Quarterly) on the title page.
- In the introduction to Volume 8, Fitzroy Carrington advised that Campbell Dodgson had become editor. Of note, Carrington used the unhyphenated title in his introduction even though the title page of the volume was hyphenated.
- Volume 9 (1922) listed Dodgson as editor and Carrington as American editor - it had the title page hyphenated but an interior title page without the hyphen.
- Volume 10 (1923) no longer listed Carrington and all further volumes were titled without the hyphen.

== Publication history ==
Based on The Print Collector's Newsletter 1978 vol 9, p. 22 as well as information in the various volumes.

- 1911-1912 (Vol 1, No. 1 to Vol 2, No. 3) A publication of Frederick Keppel & Co. Owned by Frederick Paul Keppel's family and Fitzroy Carrington, the shop in Manhattan has been selling etchings, drawings and other artworks. It published artist catalogues, occasionally under the title The print-collector's bulletin, since circa 1900. The new publication was edited Carrington. The first volume consisted of lists of art for sale by the company. He also edited a collection of essays from the Quarterly, which appeared in 1912 as Prints and their makers.
- 1912-1917 (Vol 2, No. 4 to Vol 7 No. 4) Publication of the Museum of Fine Arts, Boston. Carrington left to become Curator of Prints and Drawings at the museum, and took the publication with him to Boston. According to the museum, the Quarterly was only publication in the United States dedicated to prints at the time.
- 1918–1921, suspended due to the war
- 1921–1936 London, England publication by J. Dent & Sons. Campbell Dodgson, keeper of the British Museum print room as editor and Carrington listed as American editor.
  - Quarterly Notes published in Vol 23, No. 4 October 1936 indicate that the magazine had not recovered from the worldwide financial crisis of 1931 and will be ending.
- 1937–1942 purchased by Kansas City, MO dealer, J. H. Bender
  - Vol 24, No. 1 February 1937 cover shows, the editor is Alfred Fowler and J. H. Bender of Kansas City, MO as director.
- 1942 – 1948, suspended due to war with Vol 29, No. 2 Apr 1942
- 1946 purchased by USA publisher, William Edwin Rudge.
- 1948 – Vol 29, #3 Nov 1948 restarted publication in a slightly larger format under William Edwin Rudge, Publisher, Woodstock, Vermont.
- 1951 – Vol 30, #3 merged with Print V6, #4 and Vol 30, #4 merged with Print Vol 7 #1 August 1951. After that The Print Collector's Quarterly ceased to exist.

=== Anthology edition ===
- The Print Collector's Quarterly. An Anthology of Essays on Eminent Printmakers of the World; Mason, Lauris and Ludman, Joan, eds; Millwood, New York: KTO Press, 1977. The editors recast the original edition of this publication and placed the articles in alphabetical order of subject reproducing 6,600 of the original 13,800 pages. ISBN 9780527622053
