= Coptic binding =

Bookbinding methods

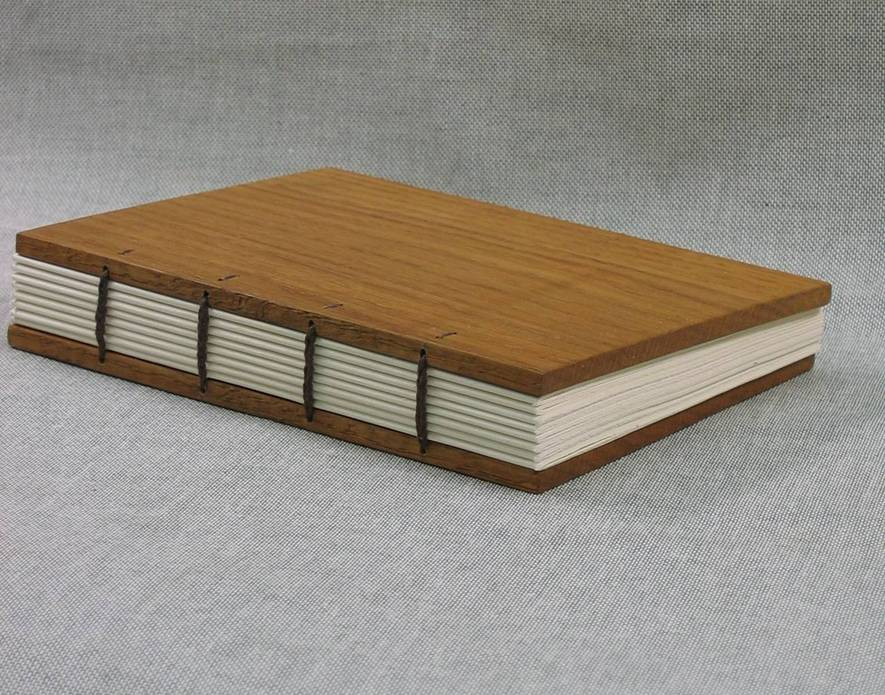
Simple Coptic binding (model)

Coptic binding or Coptic sewing comprises methods of bookbinding employed by early Christians in Egypt, the Copts, and used from as early as the 2nd century AD to the 11th century. (Note: It is sometimes claimed that the Coptic binding, and thus the western codex, originated in the 4th century AD. While codex binding did flourish in the 4th century, several extant codex fragments are dated to the 2nd century, and more than 250 exist from before the year 300. (See Turner, chapter 7, and Szirmai, chapter 2.)) The term is also used to describe modern bindings sewn in the same style.

Coptic bindings, the first true codices, are characterized by one or more sections of parchment, papyrus, or paper sewn through their folds, and (if more than one section) attached to each other with chain stitch linkings across the spine, rather than to the thongs or cords running across the spine that characterise European bindings from the 8th century onwards. In practice, the phrase "Coptic binding" usually refers to multi-section bindings, while single-section Coptic codices are often referred to as "Nag Hammadi bindings", after the 13 codices found in 1945 which exemplify the form.

== Nag Hammadi bindings ==
Nag Hammadi bindings were constructed with a textblock of papyrus sheets, assembled into a single section and trimmed along the fore edge after folding to prevent the inner sheets from extending outward beyond the outer sheets. Because the inner sheets were narrower than the outer sheets after trimming, the width of text varied through the textblock, and it is likely that the papyrus was not written on until after it was bound; this, in turn, would have made it a necessity to calculate the number of sheets needed for a manuscript before it was written and bound. (Note: Turner points out that a scribe could, however, insert a single leaf either in the middle of the book or at the end; some evidence points to this having been done in two of the Nag Hammadi codices.) Covers of Nag Hammadi bindings were limp leather, stiffened with waste sheets of papyrus. The textblocks were sewn with tackets, with leather stays along the inside fold as reinforcement. These tackets also secured the textblock to the covers; on some of the Nag Hammadi bindings, the tackets extended to the outside of the covering leather, while on others the tackets were attached to a strip of leather which served as a spine liner, and which was in turn pasted to the covers. A flap, either triangular or rectangular, extended from the front cover of the book, and was wrapped around the fore edge of the book when closed. Attached to the flap was a long leather thong which was wrapped around the book two or three times, and which served as a clasp to keep the book securely shut.

== Multi-section Coptic bindings ==
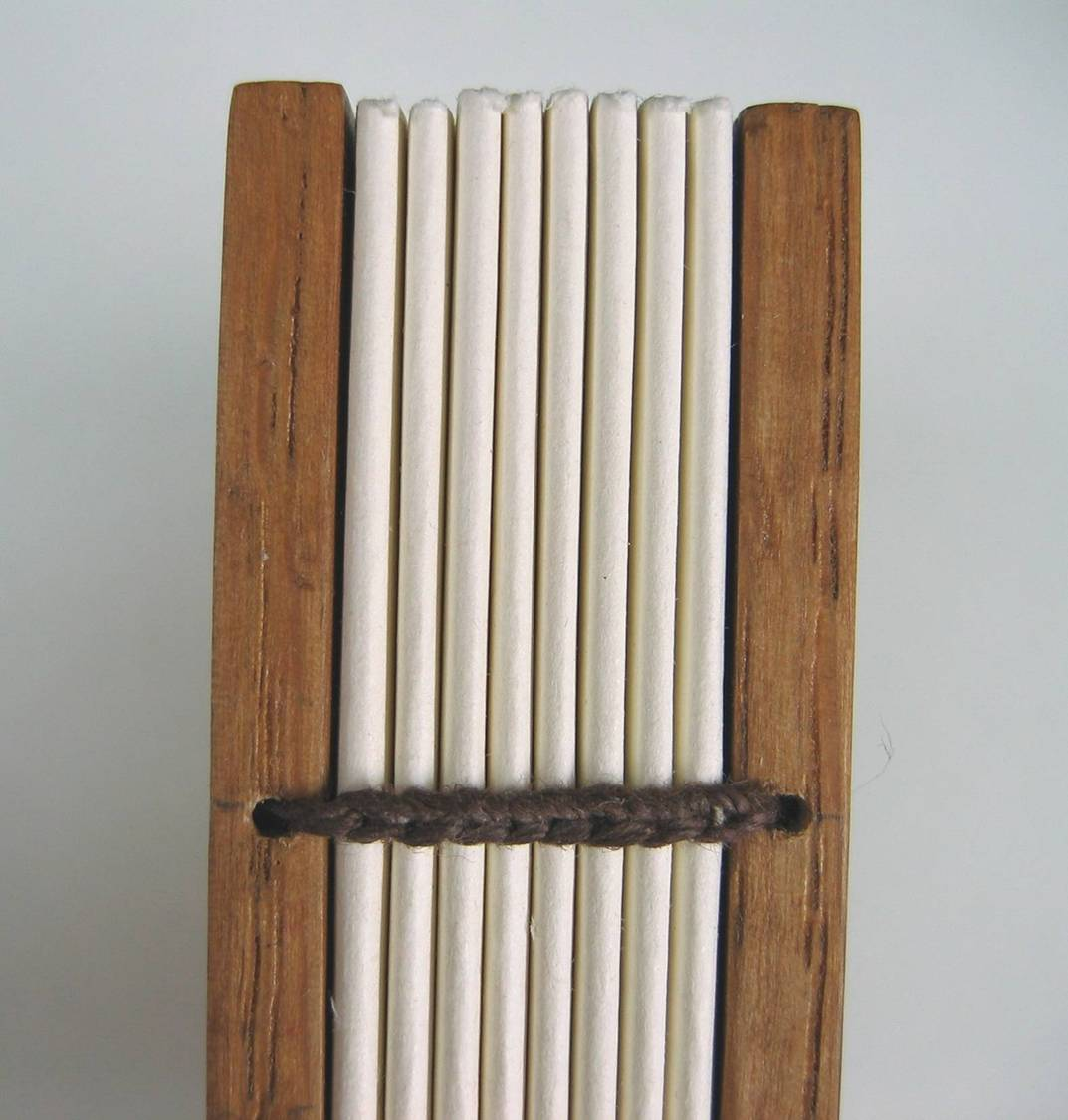
Detail of Coptic-style sewing (model)

Multi-section Coptic bindings had cover boards that were initially composed of layers of papyrus, though by the 4th century, wooden boards were also frequent. Leather covering was also common by the 4th century, and all subsequent Western decorated leather bindings descend from Coptic bindings.

Historical Coptic bindings also featured lined spines with flanges and headbands. Their gatherings were generally sewn through the folds using chain or kettle stitches without the sewing supports found in some other bookbinding traditions.

Traditional Coptic bookbinding involved sewing folded gatherings together using chain stitches along the spine. Depending on the size of the manuscript, binders typically used between two and five sewing stations. The stitching connected successive gatherings and could also be used to attach the wooden or papyrus-board covers to the book.

Although Coptic and Ethiopian bookbinding traditions are historically related, their sewing structures differ, and the term "Coptic chain-stitch" should not be used interchangeably with traditional Ethiopian sewing techniques.

Approximately 120 original and complete Coptic bindings survive in the collections of museums and libraries, though the remnants of as many as 500 Coptic bindings survive. (Note: Glaister does not give the methodology of his figure, and given its low count, it probably refers only to intact bindings; Szirmai's count includes fragments or sheets which show evidence of being bound, such as sewing holes or codex pagination.)

The few very early European bindings to survive use the Coptic sewing technique, notably the St Cuthbert Gospel in the British Library (c. 698) and the Cadmug Gospels at Fulda (c. 750).

An important collection of historical Coptic bindings comes from manuscripts discovered in 1910 at Hamouli, near the Monastery of St. Michael in Egypt's Fayum district. Pierpont Morgan purchased most of these manuscripts in 1911, and nearly all had been discovered with their original bindings. Because both the manuscripts and their bindings were fragile, they were separated for preservation, resulting in the loss of some evidence about their original sewing techniques.

During the 1980s, conservator Deborah Evetts carried out treatments to stabilize and protect the historical Coptic bindings at the Morgan Library & Museum. These treatments included reinforcing deteriorating papyrus boards and using Japanese paper to support fragile areas. Later preservation efforts introduced individual protective enclosures made from archival foam board and custom-cut polyethylene foam. These enclosures reduced the need for direct handling while allowing researchers to examine the bindings more safely.

== Modern Coptic bindings ==
Modern Coptic bindings can be made with or without covering leather; if left uncovered, a Coptic binding is able to open 360°. If the leather is omitted, a Coptic binding is non-adhesive, and does not require any glue in its construction.

Artisans and crafters often use coptic binding when creating hand made art journals or other books.

== See also ==
- Ethiopian binding
