= Section (bookbinding) =

Group of printed leaves, folded in the middle and bound together into a book binding

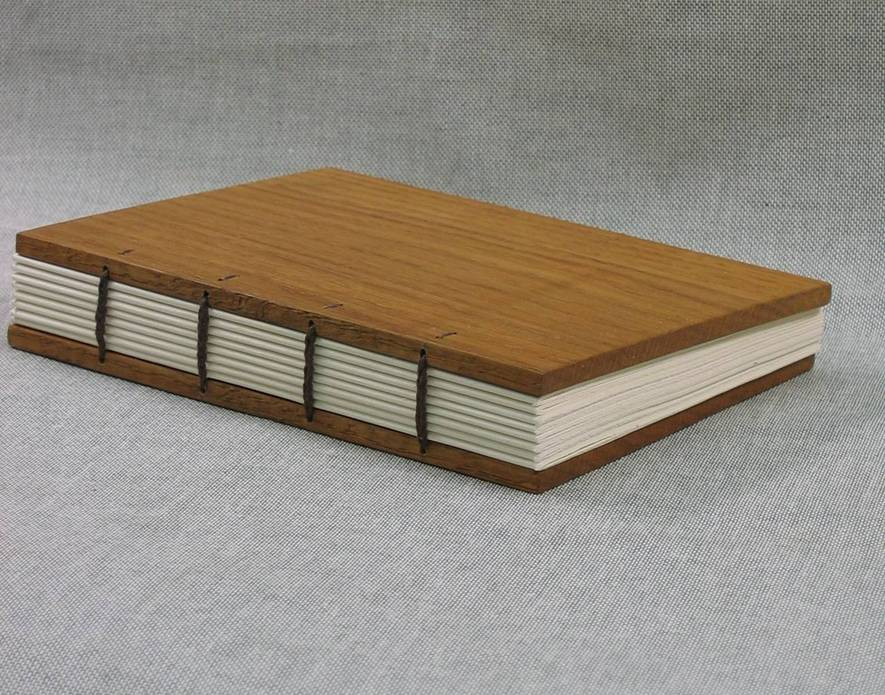
Modern model of Coptic binding with eight sections

In bookbinding, a section, gathering, or signature is a group of sheets folded in half, to be worked into the binding as a unit.

== Description ==
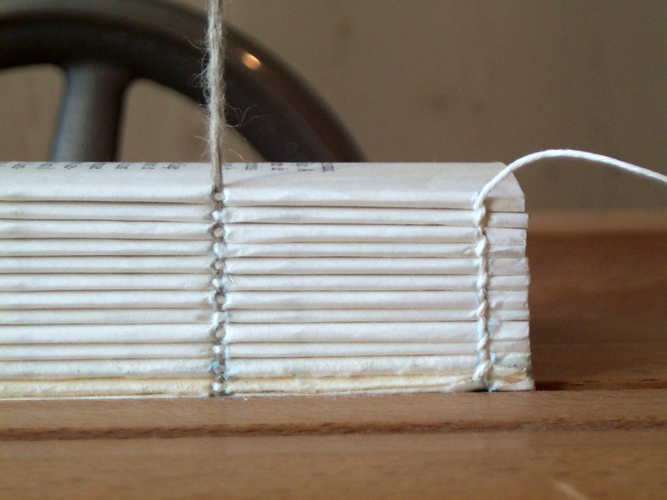
Twelve gatherings can be seen in this spine-side view of a book being bound.

A section, gathering, or signature is a group of sheets folded in half, to be worked into a binding as a unit. The section is the basic building block of codex bindings. In Western bookbinding, sections are sewn through their folds, with the sewing thread securing each section to the one bound before it.

The gatherings can be seen by looking at the top or bottom sides of the book, though some cheaper modern books are perfect bound with no gatherings, each sheet glued directly to the binding. The gatherings are sewn together at the spine, done in such a way that two or more stretches of thread are visible along each gathering's innermost fold.

== Background ==
In medieval manuscripts, a gathering, or quire, was most often formed of four folded sheets of vellum or parchment, i.e. 8 leaves, 16 sides. The term quaternion (or sometimes quaternum) designates such a unit. A gathering made of a single folded sheet (i.e. two leaves, four sides) is a bifolium (plural bifolia); a gathering of two sheets (i.e. four leaves, eight sides) is a binion; and one of five sheets (10 leaves, 20 sides) is a quinion. This last meaning is preserved in the modern Italian meaning of quire: quinterno di carta.

When bookbinders started using paper, it became possible to easily stitch five to seven sheets at a time, and the number of sheets per gathering started to vary more.

== See also ==
- Section (typography)
- Signature mark
- Units of paper quantity
- Book size
- Octavo
- Imposition
