= The Young Sabot Maker =

1895 painting by Henry Ossawa Tanner

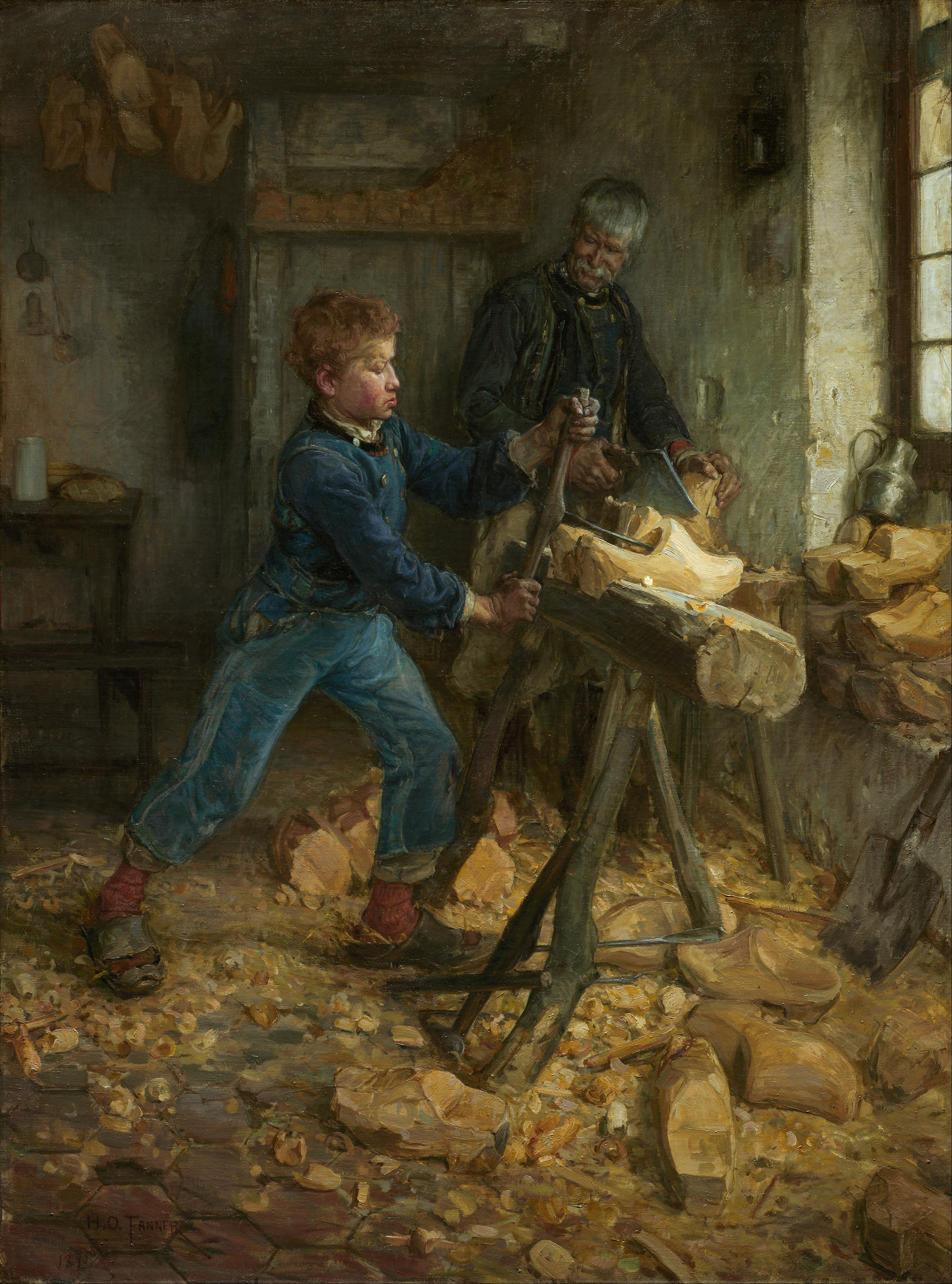
- Artist: Henry Ossawa Tanner
- Year: 1895
- Medium: oil on canvas
- Movement: genre, French academic
- Dimensions: 120.3 cm × 89.9 cm (47.4 in × 35.4 in)
- Location: Nelson-Atkins Museum of Art; Kansas City, Missouri

The Young Sabot Maker is an oil-on-canvas painting made by the American artist Henry Ossawa Tanner in 1895. The painting was accepted for the 1895 Paris Salon and was Tanner's second Salon-entered painting.

The painting follows a theme Tanner used for his genre paintings, "age instructing youth", which can also be seen in The Bagpipe Lesson and The Banjo Lesson. The painting depicts an older man proudly watching a boy push with his weight against the crossbar handle of an auger to carve a sabot, or wooden shoe. The two figures stand within the sabot maker's workshop, wood shavings scattered around them on the floor.

Measuring 47 3/8 x 35 3/8 inches (120.3 x 89.9 cm), the painting was purchased by a combination of donor sponsors and given to the Nelson-Atkins Museum of Art in 1995.

== Background ==
Tanner visited Europe in 1891. He studied in Paris, enrolling at the Académie Julian, while enjoying a sense of belonging within the city's international and racially diverse community of artists. During his first summer in France, he traveled to the village of Pont-Aven on Brittany's coast. Brittany was a popular destination for artists, and Tanner became fascinated with his rural French surroundings.

Tanner returned to the Philadelphia in the summer of 1893, after he began making an artist's study of Study for the Young Sabot Maker. He signed it "Paris 1893." It has been suggested the return was in the fall of 1892. However, he shared an apartment in Paris for part of 1893 with "sculptor Hermon A. MacNeil at 15 rue de Seine" in 1893.

== Theme ==
The figures in The Young Sabot Maker exist within a humble, timeless interior, seemingly apart from the modern world. Within the composition, Tanner emphasized the inherent dignity and ennobling effect of work that was publicized by important African-American educator, Booker T. Washington. Washington was a family friend who had helped to support Tanner's studies in Paris. He emphasized the importance of training in skilled manual labor, especially for African Americans, and built this into the curriculum he designed as the president of the Tuskegee Institute in Alabama.

== Related works ==
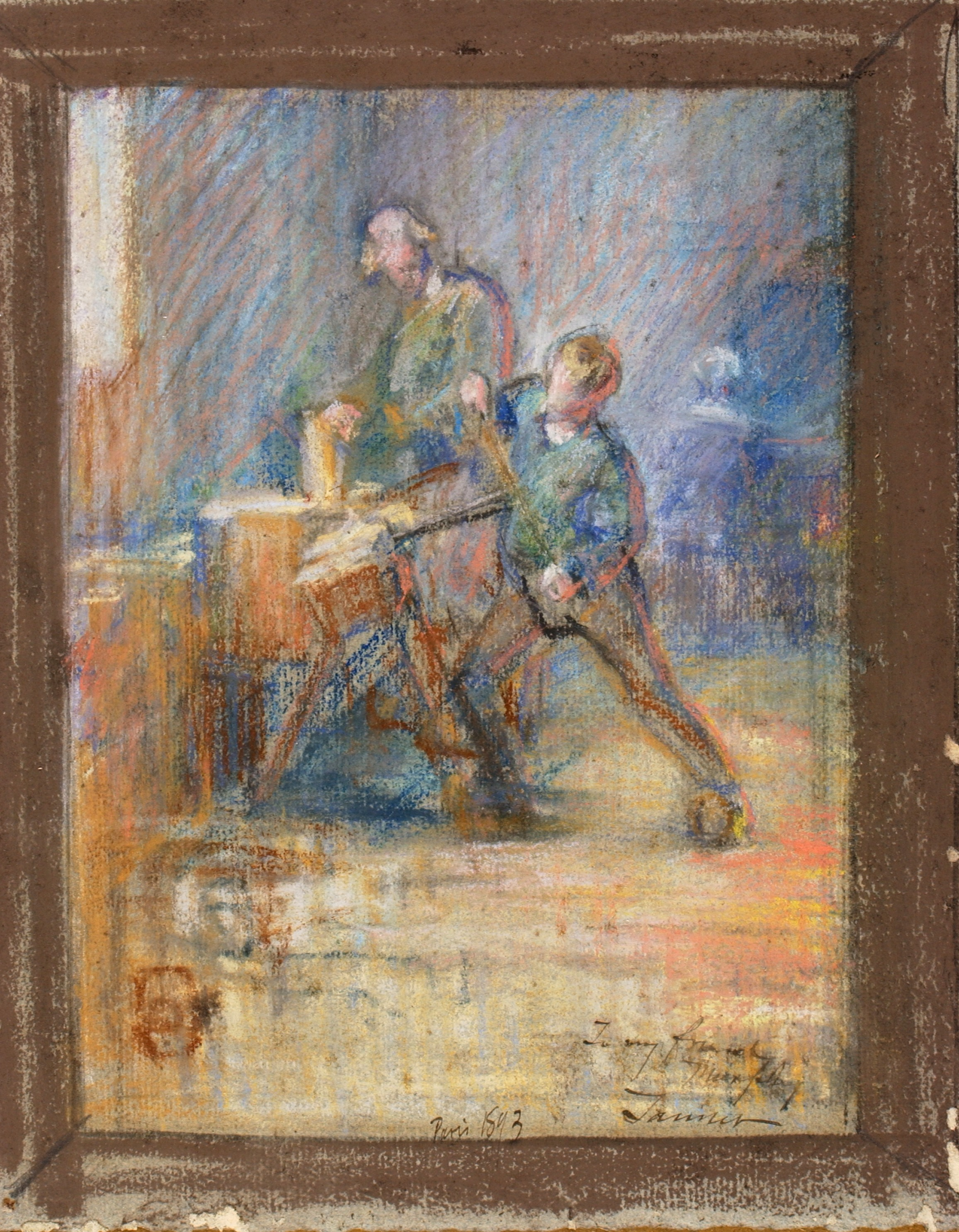
The Young Sabot Maker, "Paris, 1893", pastel and ink. Smithsonian, SAAM-1983.95.49 1

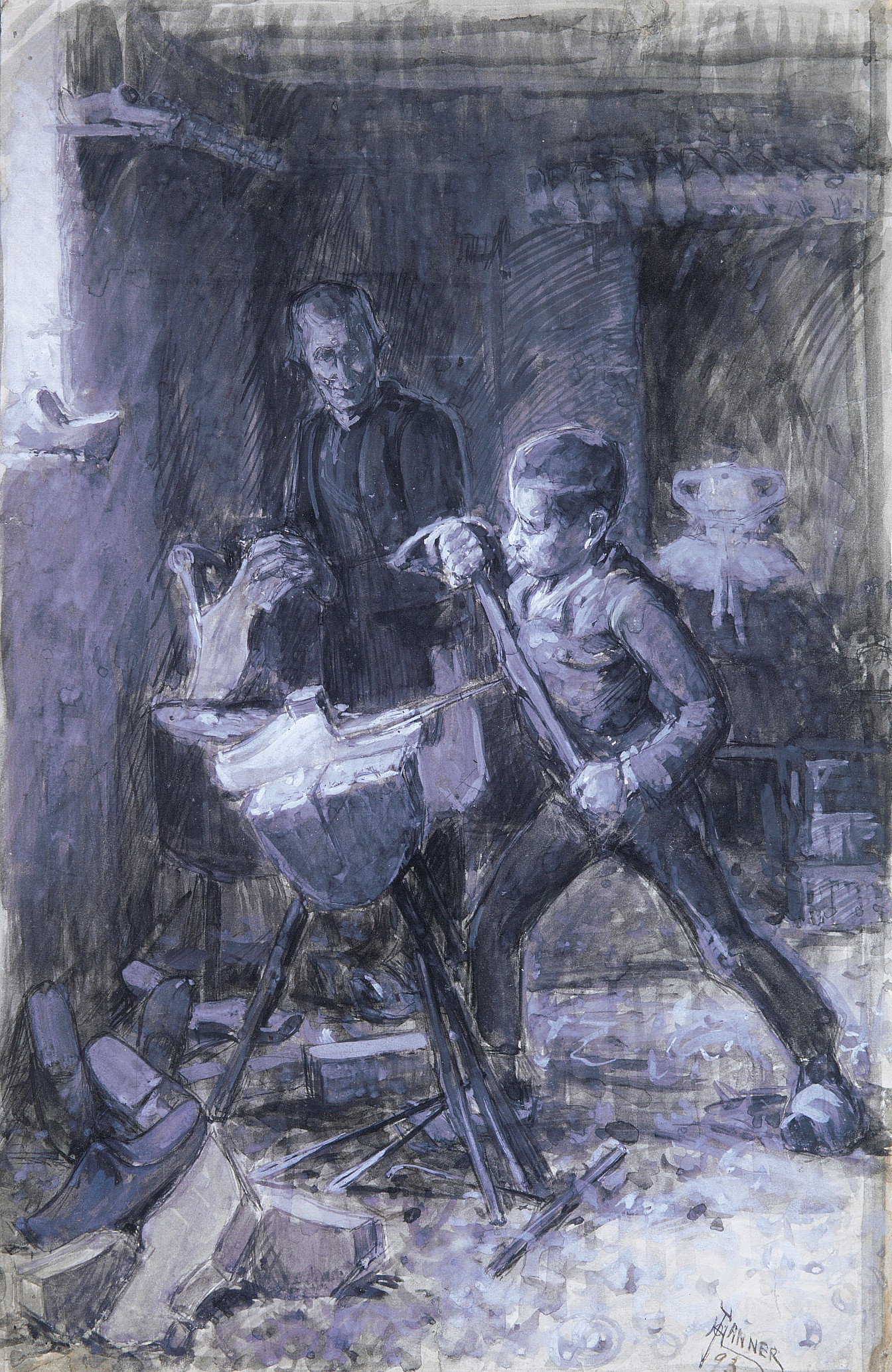
1893. Metropolitan Museum of Art. Study for the Young Sabot Maker, watercolor and gouache on white wove paper.

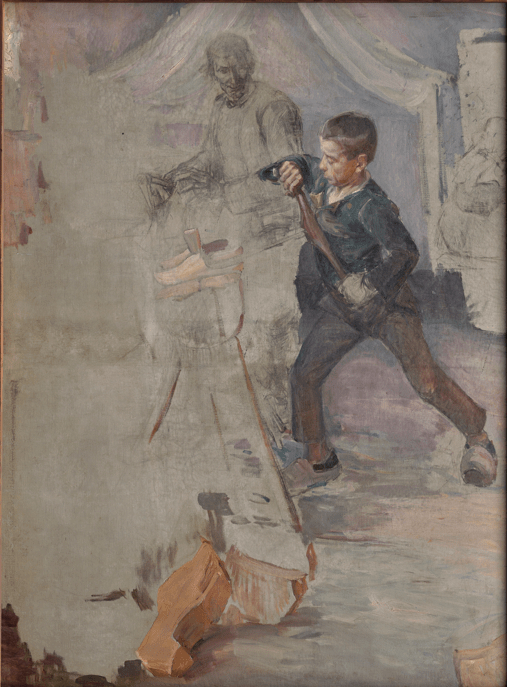
Artist's study, "The Young Sabot Maker" on the back of The Thankful Poor; the latter painting was finished and publicly displayed by April 1894.

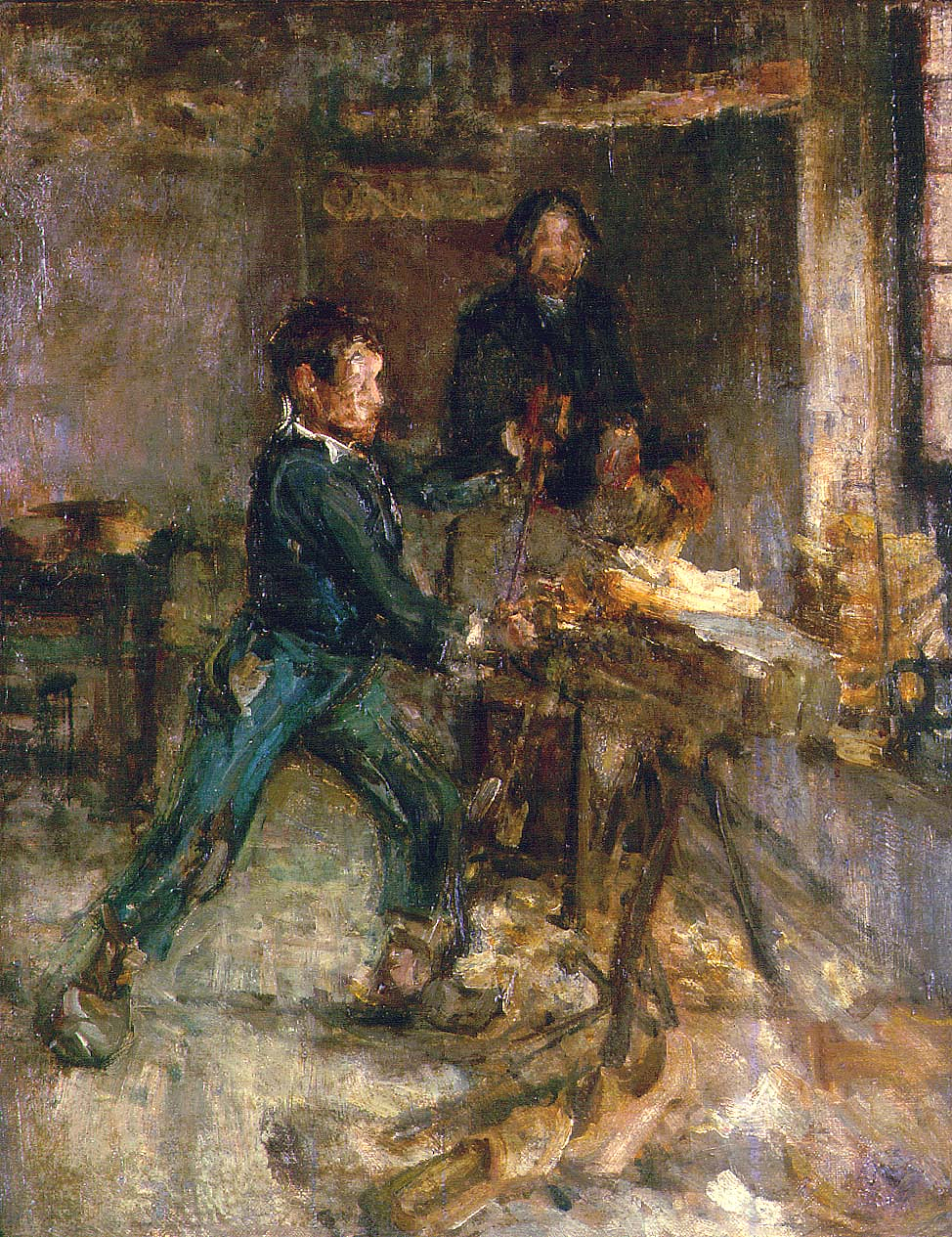
Circa 1894-1895, Smithsonian. Study for the Young Sabot Maker
- Henry Ossawa Tanner, The Young Sabot Maker, 1893, pastel and ink on paper mounted on paperboard, 10 3/8 x 8 3/8 in. (26.3 x 21.2 cm.). Smithsonian American Art Museum Gift of H. Alan and Melvin Frank 1983.95.49 Tanner began working on The Young Sabot Maker in Philadelphia in 1893. A number of preliminary sketches survive, showing the basic format for the final composition.
- Henry Ossawa Tanner, Study for the Young Sabot Maker, 1893, watercolor and gouache on white wove paper, 15 1/4 x 10 3/16 in. (38.7 x 25.9 cm.). The Metropolitan Museum of Art. Purchase, Erving Wolf Foundation Gift and Gift of Hanson K. Corning, by exchange, 1975, 1975.27.2
- Henry Ossawa Tanner, Study for the Young Sabot Maker, ca. 1895, oil on canvas, 16 1/4 x 13 in. (41.3 x 33 cm.). Smithsonian American Art Museum Gift of Mr. and Mrs. Norman Robbins 1983.95.208

== See also ==
- List of paintings by Henry Ossawa Tanner
