= The Banjo Lesson =

Painting by Henry Ossawa Tanner

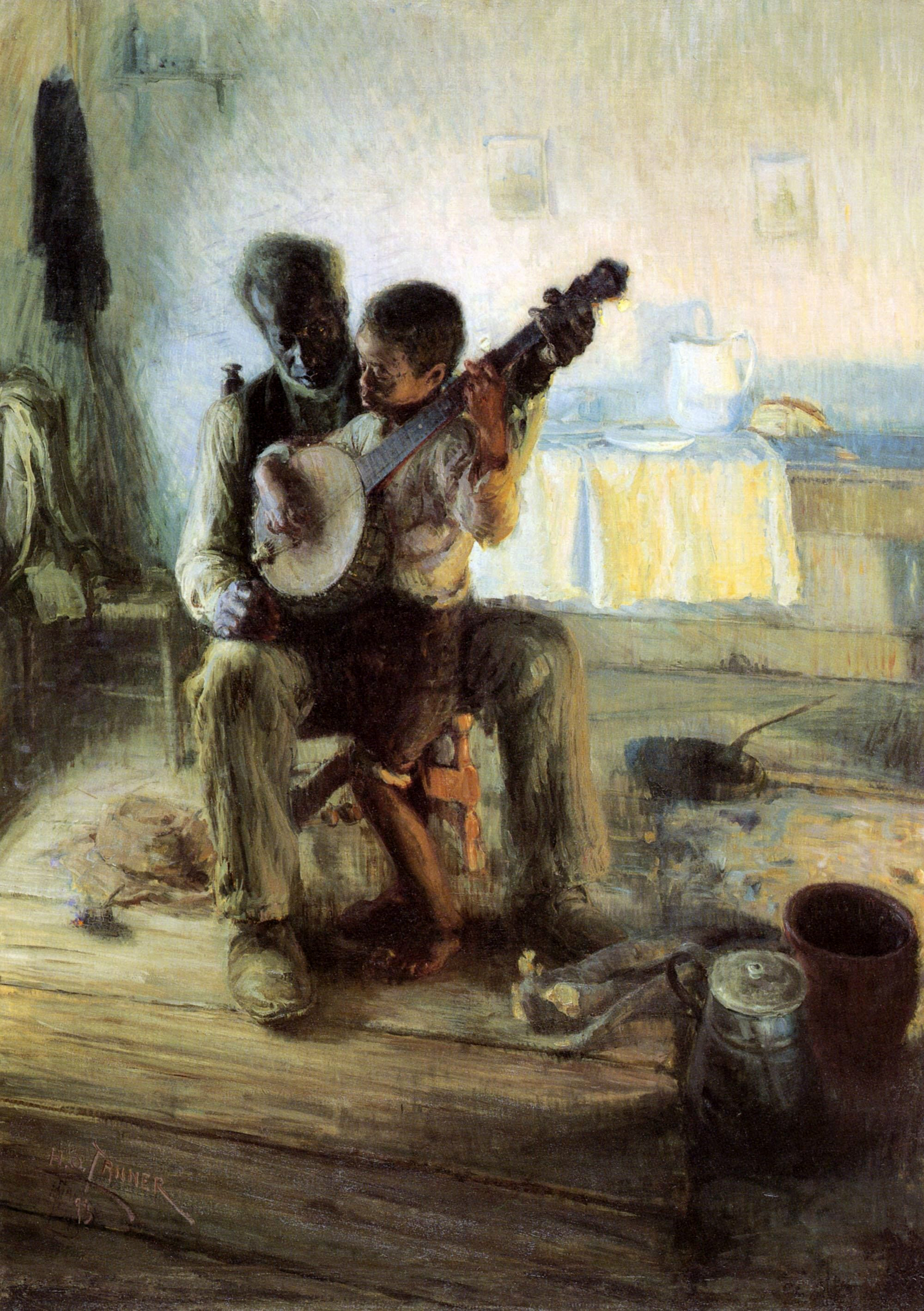
Henry Ossawa Tanner, The Banjo Lesson, 1893, Hampton University Museum. Gift to museum by Robert C. Ogden.

The Banjo Lesson is an 1893 oil painting by African-American artist Henry Ossawa Tanner. It depicts two African-Americans in a humble domestic setting: an old black man is teaching a young boy – possibly his grandson – to play the banjo.

The painting was Tanner's first accepted entry into the Paris Salon, and has been held by Hampton University since 1894. It is possibly the first painting by an African American to depict other African Americans in a realistic, "genre" style of painting, in which scenes or events from everyday life are chosen for contemplation, including ordinary people engaged in common activities. The painting has elements of American Realism and of French Impressionism.

== Tanner's background ==
Tanner was born in Pittsburgh in 1859 and grew up in Philadelphia. His mother may have been born a slave in Virginia; his father was a free-born black minister in the African Methodist Episcopal Church and became a bishop in 1888. After studying with Thomas Eakins at the Pennsylvania Academy of the Fine Arts from 1879, where he was one of its first black students, Tanner ran a photography business in Atlanta, Georgia, from 1889, and taught drawing at Clark College. His business was not a success, and he left to study in Rome in 1891, sponsored by Bishop Joseph Crane Hartzell of the (white) Methodist Episcopal Church.

Tanner settled in Paris, where he studied at the Académie Julian from 1891, studying with Jean-Joseph Benjamin-Constant and Jean-Paul Laurens. He lived in France for the rest of his life, although he would visit the United States.

Tanner returned to the United States in the summer of 1893. Ultimately, Tanner would spend more than a year on this recuperative visit to his native country during which time he painted or finished a number of iconic genre works, including The Thankful Poor and The Bagpipe Lesson, and he engaged in civil-rights work, speaking as a public figure at the 1893 Chicago Exposition and exhibiting The Bagpipe Lesson there. He returned to Paris on September 22, 1894.

In the spring of 1894, Tanner sent his Banjo Lesson to the Salon in Paris, ahead of his return to France. The painting was accepted, being listed in the Salon's catalog as La Leçon de musique. The painting was his first to be accepted into the Salon. His next painting to be accepted to the Salon would be The Young Sabot Maker in May 1–June 1895. It would be followed in the Salon in April 1896 by Daniel in the Lion's Den (painted in 1895), a work which would attract the attention of Jean-Léon Gérôme and begin Tanner's series of religiously themed paintings.

== Painting's origin ==
Other versions

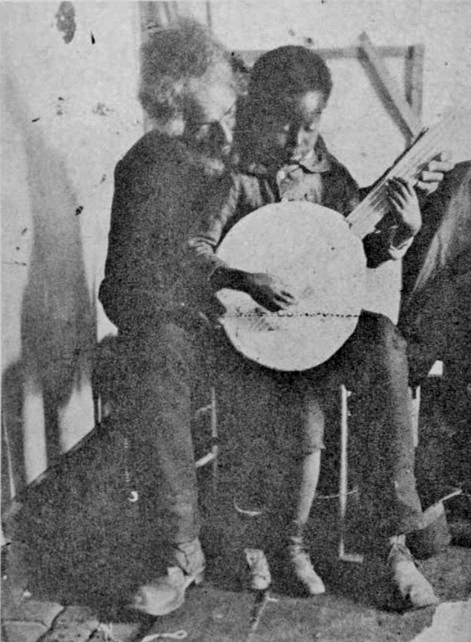
Photograph by Henry Ossawa Tanner, found in France, which was used as a study. (Note: The photo was passed down in the family in France.)

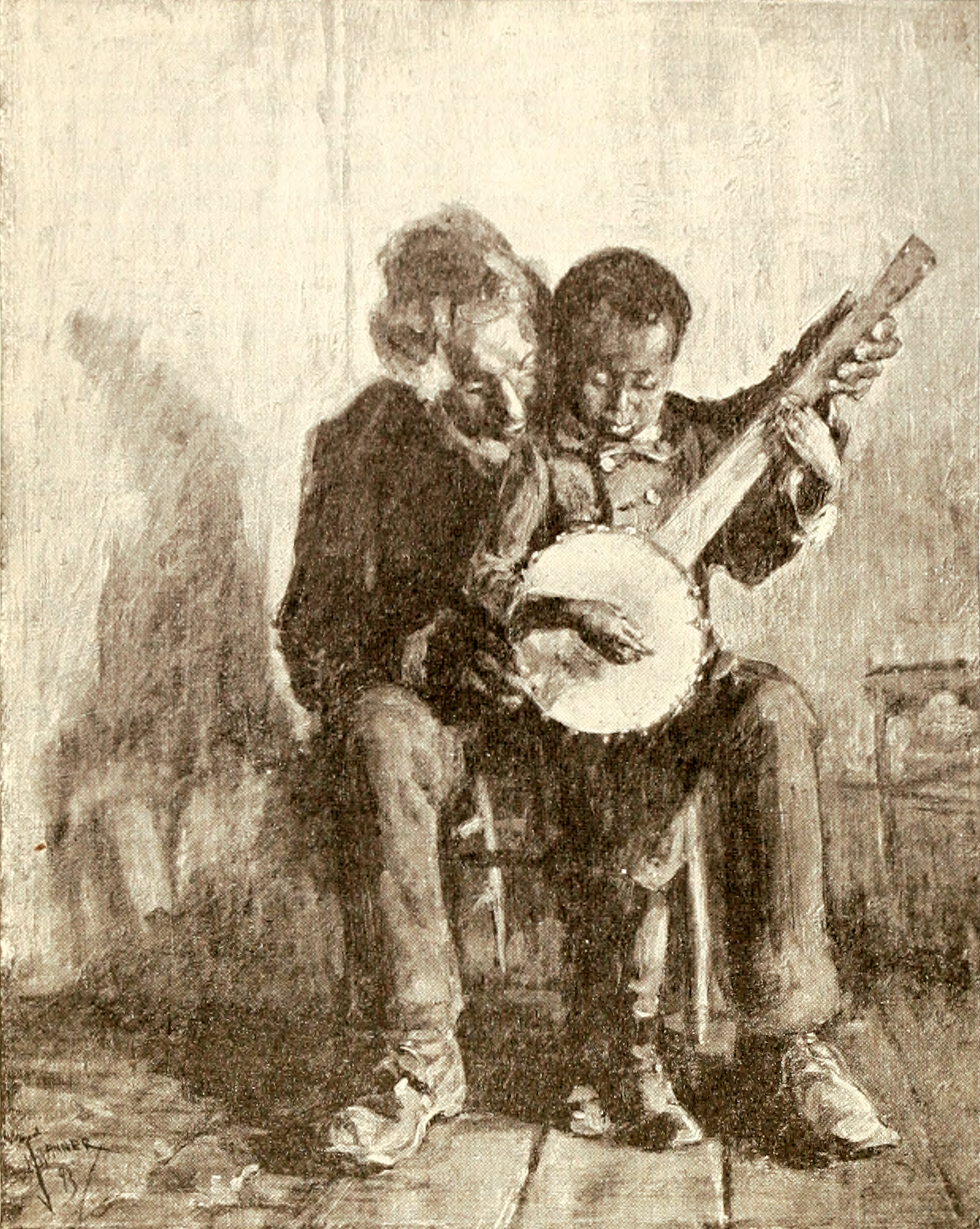
Henry Ossawa Tanner's image for Harper's Young People, Dec 5, 1893 page 84

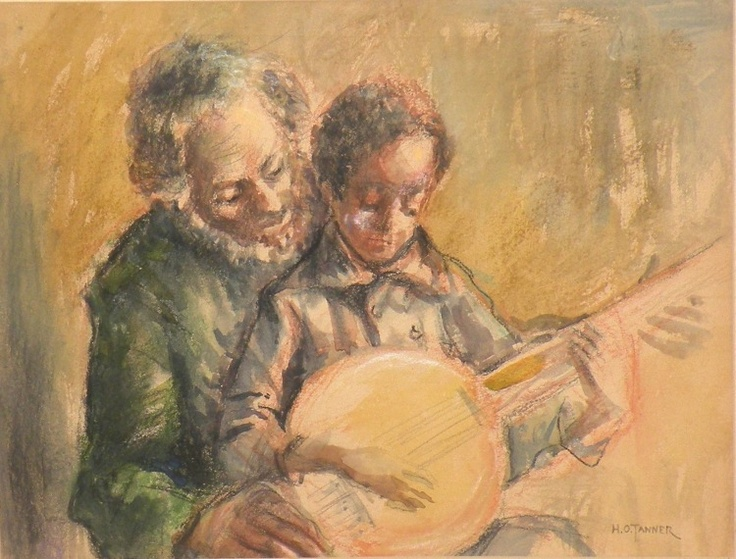
Another version of The Banjo Lesson by Henry Ossawa Tanner. Undated.

Tanner painted multiple versions of the painting's theme, one which was printed in a magazine in December 1893. This version closely resembles the photo found in Paris.

Tanner wrote the date 1893 with his signature on The Banjo Lesson, probably in Philadelphia. (Note: A review of the painting appeared on November 12, 1893 in the Philadelphia Inquirer.) Details for the paintings completion aren't fully known and the painting fits into a group of paintings that Tanner worked on from 1893-1895. (Note: Tanner competed four major works, The Bagpipe Lesson (1892), The Banjo Lesson (1893), The Thankful Poor (1894) and The Young Sabot Maker (1895). The Bagpipe Lesson is of a subject from Brittany and was possibly rejected by the Paris Salon before being displayed in the United States. The Young Sabot Maker has one study that was painted in Paris in 1893 and one which was found on the back of the 1894 The Thankful Poor, which was painted in the United States. The final painting was then exhibited in the 1895 Paris Salon. The Thankful Poor which was painted in the United States, continues a theme from the earlier paintings, in which an older generation influenced the youngest generation.)

He may have begun work on the painting in France, but this is not certain. (Note: A photo study (likely used in creating a version of the painting) was found in Paris. However, he resided for most of his life in France and the photo's time and place are not indicated.) Rae Alexander-Mintner said that The Banjo Lesson was probably painted in Philadelphia, since it was exhibited there from April 28 to May 5, 1894. If painted in the United States, it would have been in the period Tanner was in the United States to recuperate after suffering from typhoid fever, from about the summer of 1893 to the spring of 1894. (Note: Tanner returned to the United States in the summer of 1893. It has been suggested the return was in the fall of 1892. However, he in Paris, shared an apartment with "sculptor Hermon A. MacNeil at 15 rue de Seine" in 1893. Supporting his stay through 1892 is his Study for the Young Sabot Maker, signed "Paris 1893.")

There are good reasons to think the painting was made in the United States. The first version of the painting was published in an American magazine, for which Tanner created the image around a story in the magazine. There is also his focus on African American subjects; he did civil rights work during the visit to the United States and indicated that his paintings were part of that work. (Note: Tanner wrote of himself (using the third person): "Since his return from Europe he has painted mostly Negro subjects, he feels drawn to such subjects on account of the newness of the field and because of a desire to represent the serious, and pathetic side of life among them, and it is his thought that other things being equal, he who has most sympathy with his subject will obtain the best results. To his mind many of the artists who have represented Negro life have only seen the comic, the ludicrous side of it, and have lacked sympathy with and appreciation for the warm big heart that dwells within such a rough exterior.") That work included a public appearance at the Chicago Columbian Exposition and work funding the Philadelphia chapter of the National Citizens Rights Association (NCRA). Tanner made other paintings featuring African Americans in a positive light during this U.S. visit, including The Thankful Poor and Portrait of the Artist's Mother.

=== Original subjects ===
In 1888, Tanner visited the Blue Ridge Mountains at Highlands, North Carolina, spending a summer sketching and photographing residents. Researchers have pointed out this trip as a potential source for his The Banjo Lesson. In writing of that trip, Tanner didn't mention sketching, but focused on photography.

=== Exposition ===
The Chicago Columbian Exposition is another prominent variable in the painting's creation; in August 1893, Tanner addressed the "Congress on Africa which took place in conjunction with the World's Columbian Exposition." At that exposition, his earlier painting, The Bagpipe Lesson was displayed. There has been confusion on this, as prominent web sources such as the White House Historical Association have said that it was The Banjo Lesson that was on display at the exposition.

During his 1893-1894 visit back to the United States, he spoke at the Congress on Africa at the 1893 World's Columbian Exposition in Chicago. One possible influence on The Banjo Lesson was Paul Laurence Dunbar's poem "A Banjo Song", included in his first book Oak and Ivy printed in small edition privately in 1892 when the poet was aged 20, and which Dunbar may have recited at the World's Columbian Exposition.

=== Christmas story ===
About the same time that he was working on The Banjo Lesson, Tanner completed a very similar image based on a photograph, used to illustrate a story in Harper's Young People. His genre painting The Banjo Lesson resembles the illustration in "Uncle Tim's Compromise on Christmas" by Ruth McEnery Stuart, published in December 1893 in Harper's Young People (volume 15, page 84).

In the story, an old man (old Tim) gave his banjo, his only valuable possession, to the boy (little Tim) as a Christmas present, and the compromise was that they would share it.

"The only thing in the world that the old man held as a personal possession was his old banjo. It was the one thing the little boy counted on as a precious future property, and often, at all hours of the day or evening, old Tim could be seen sitting before the cabin, his arms around the boy, who stood between his knees, while, with eyes closed, he ran his withered fingers over the strings, picking out the tunes that best recalled the stories of olden days that he loved to tell into the little fellow's ear. And sometimes, holding the banjo steady, he would invite little Tim to try his tiny hands at picking the strings."

The discovery of the illustration for this story and of the original photo has created arguments, including that The Banjo Lesson wasn't part of civil-rights work, but was simply work for pay (and that Tanner was happy to let others think he was white, with no qualms about illustrating a story steeped in racist plantation language and ideas). Further, it is claimed that the painting's "genesis fundamentally alters the painting's intent and cultural significance."

Those arguments were disputed by Naurice Frank Woods Jr. He points out that whatever reasons Tanner had for making other versions of the painting, he made the final version of The Banjo Lesson during the period in which he was steeped in civil-rights work, including starting a chapter of the National Citizens Rights Association (NCRA) and lecturing on "The American Negro in Art" at the World's Congress on Africa. Further he himself saw his painting as directly contradicting the racist stereotypes used widely when depicting African Americans in art.

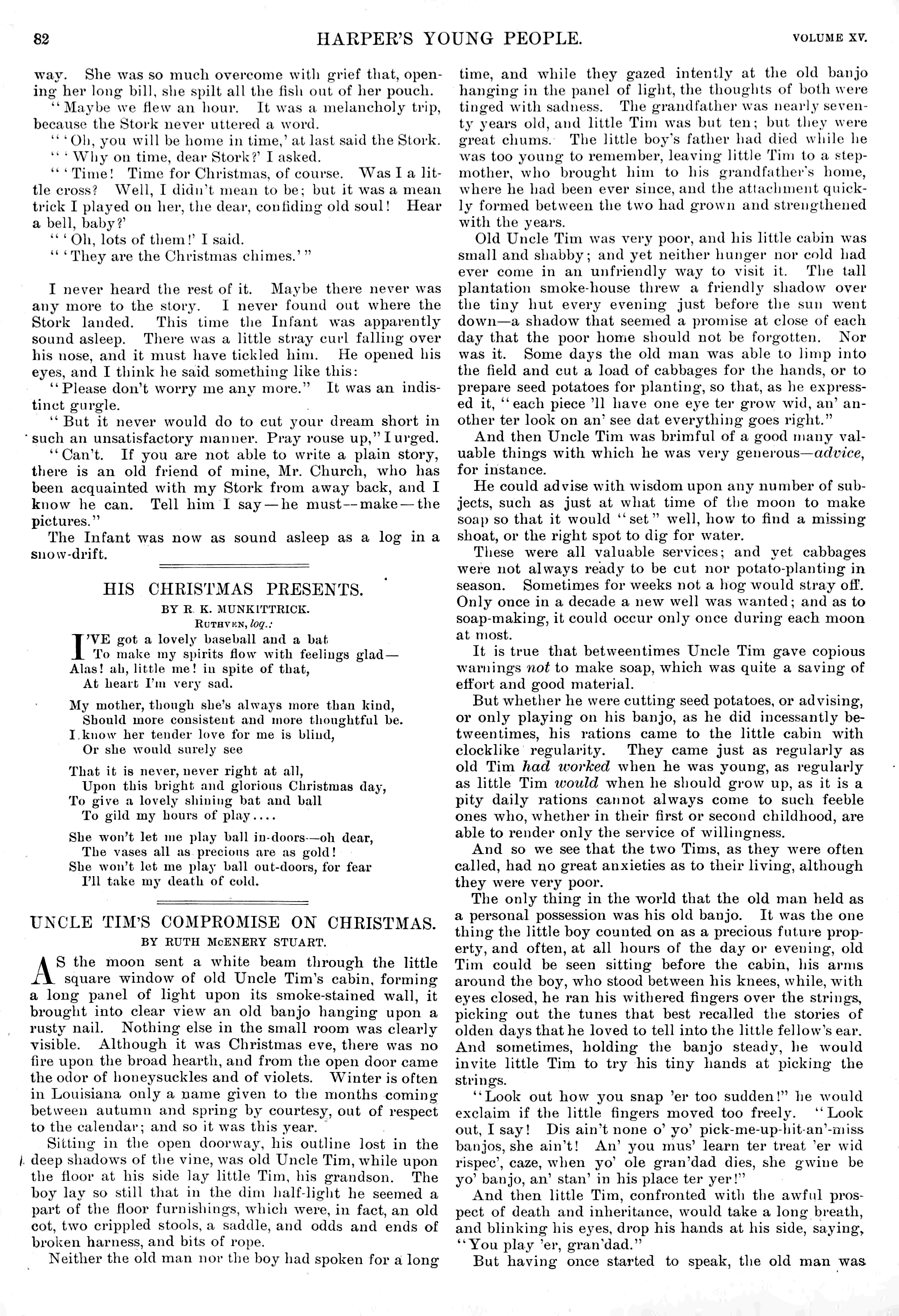
Uncle Tim's Compromise on Christmas, by Ruth McEnery Stuart, page 1.

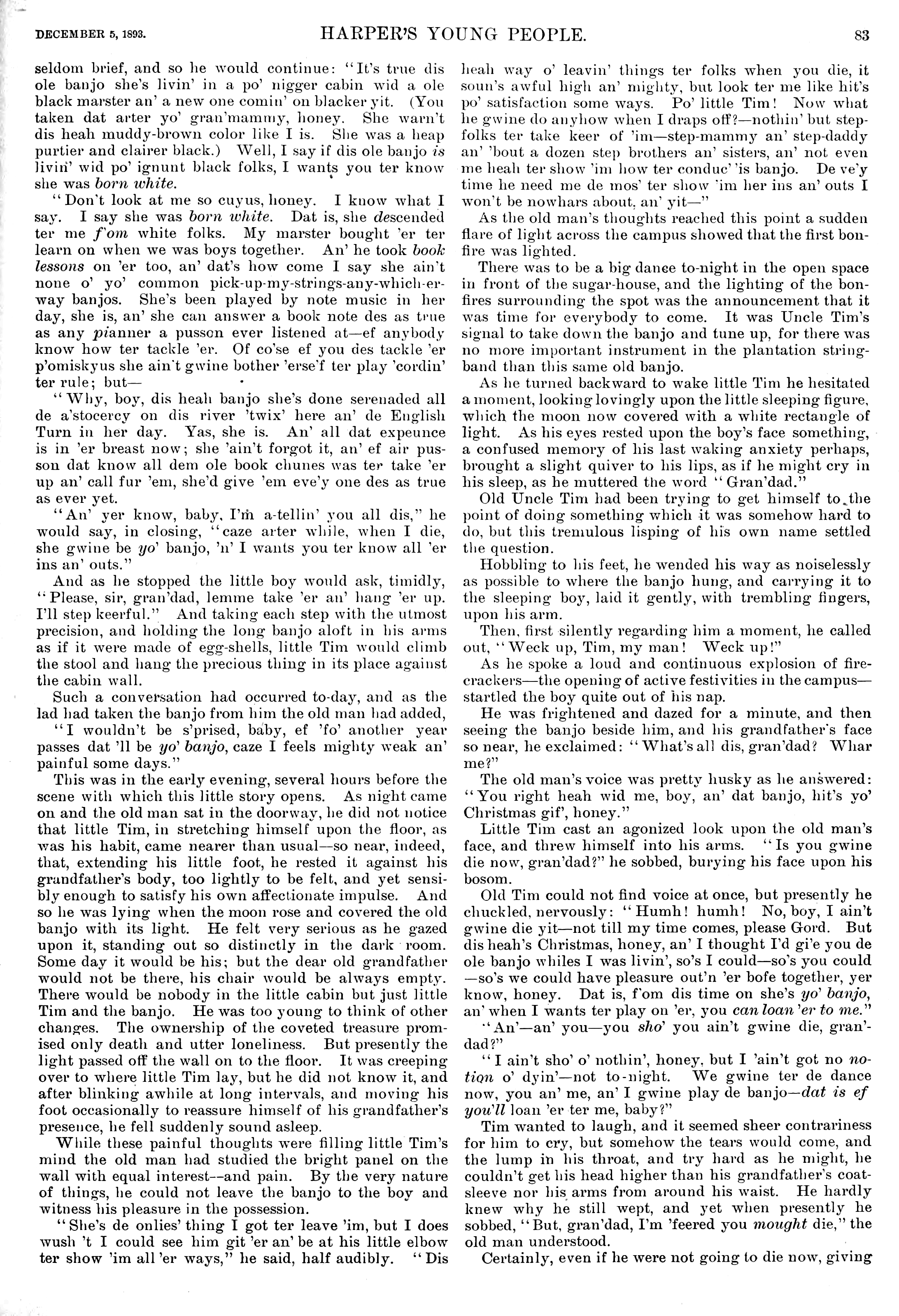
Uncle Tim's Compromise on Christmas, by Ruth McEnery Stuart, page 2.

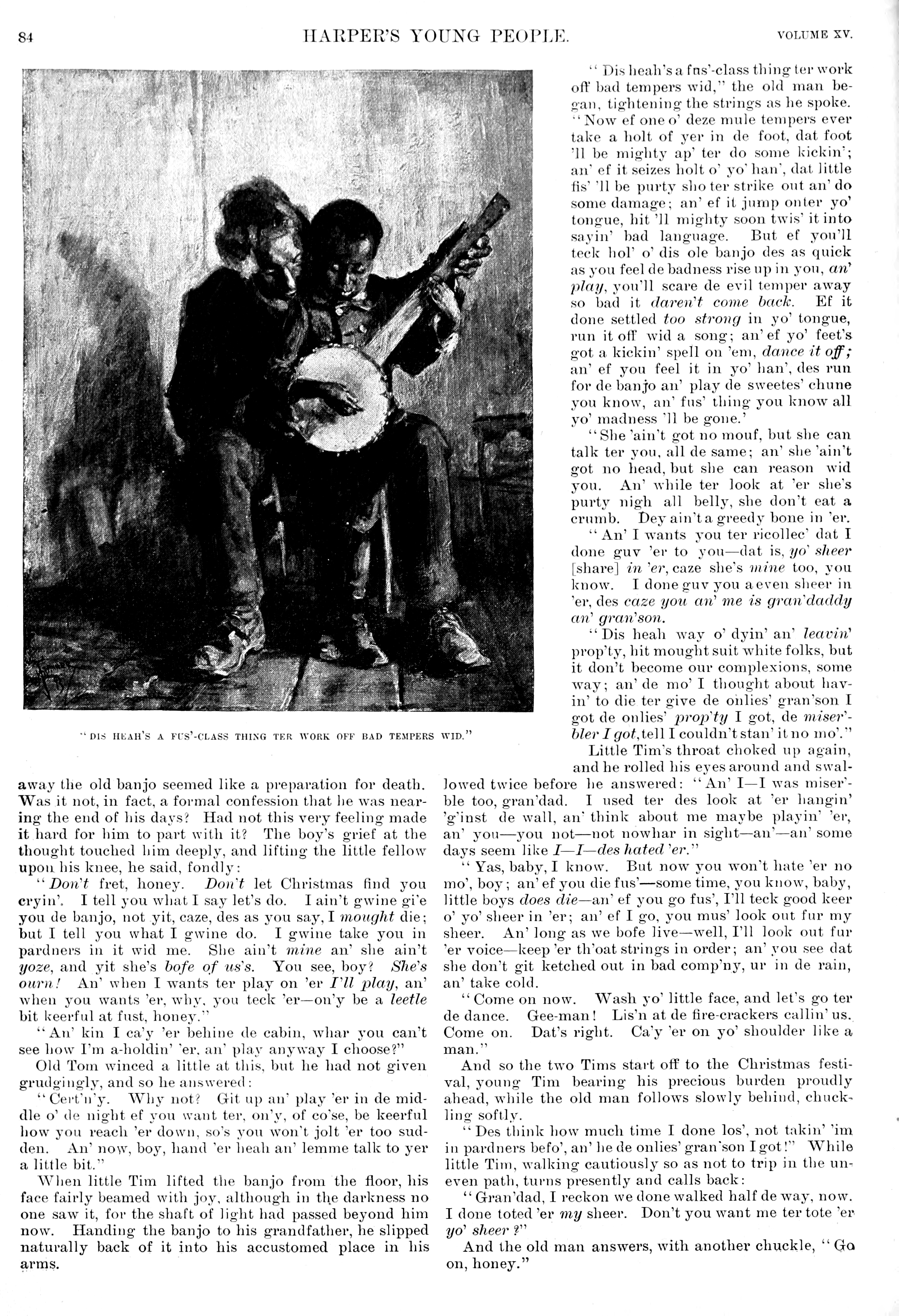
Uncle Tim's Compromise on Christmas, by Ruth McEnery Stuart, page 3.

== Description of The Banjo Lesson ==
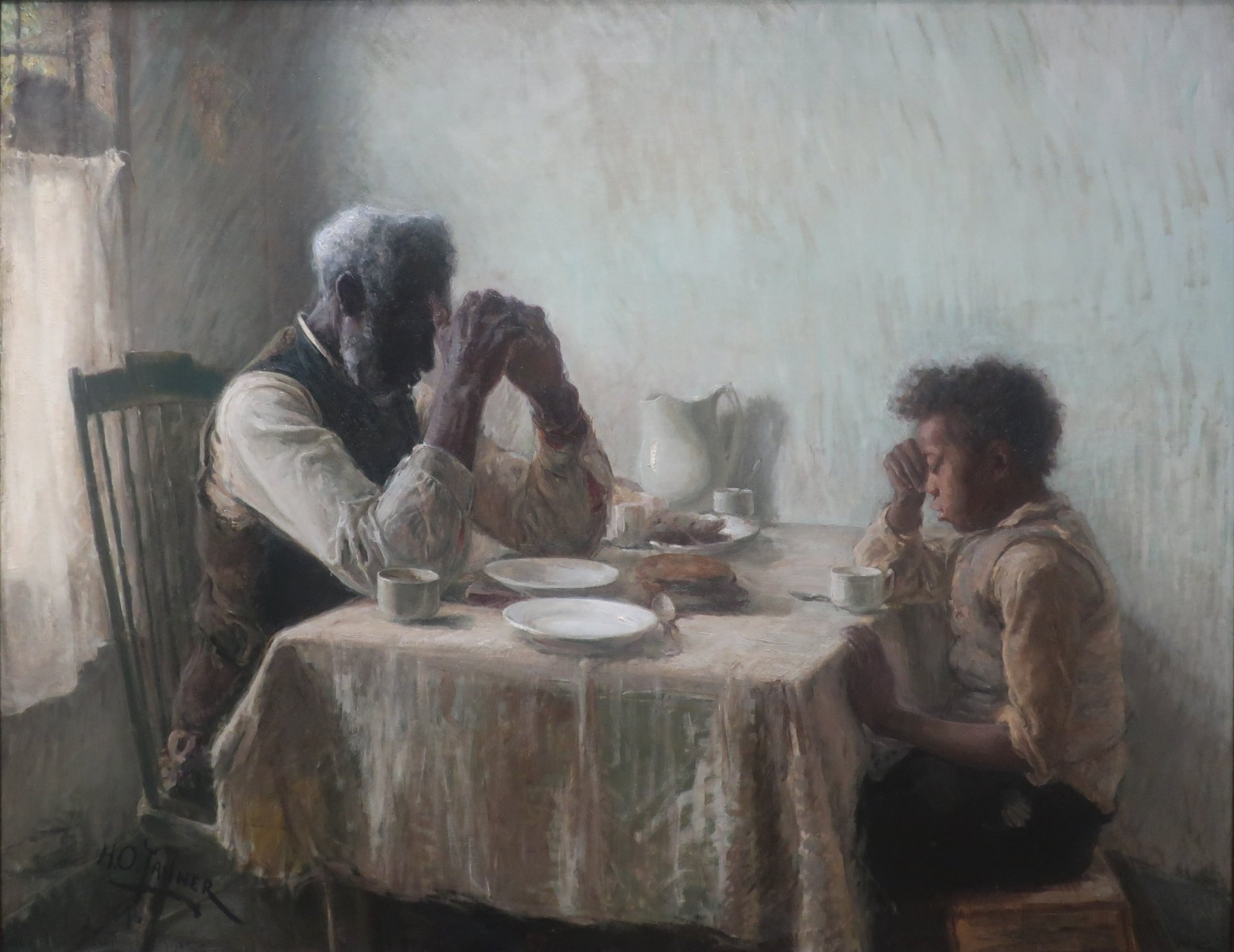
The Thankful Poor, 1894.

The painting measures 124.46 cm × 90.17 cm (49.00 in × 35.50 in).

The painting depicts a grey-haired old man sitting on a chair in his sparsely furnished home, with a boy standing close before him between his spread legs holding the musical instrument. Both are observing as the child carefully plucks the strings with one hand, while holding a chord with the other hand; the weight of the instrument is supported by the man. In the background, some crockery and a loaf of bread are placed on a table or sideboard, with a few small pictures on the bare wall, a second chair, and a coat hanging beside a shelf. In the foreground are some kindling and cooking vessels on the bare floorboards.

The scene is lit from two directions: a cold bluish light from a window to the left and a warmer yellow light from a fireplace to the right, both unseen. The colour palette is dominated by humble, earthy tones, blacks, greys and browns, whites and yellows. The setting is humble but not impoverished: there is a wooden floor not bare dirt, and the walls are plastered and decorated with two pictures not bare wood; the table has a clean tablecloth. The two subjects are similar to those in Tanner's 1894 painting The Thankful Poor, which depicts the old man and young boy sitting at a table, praying before a meal.

=== Stylistic roots of Tanner's paintings ===
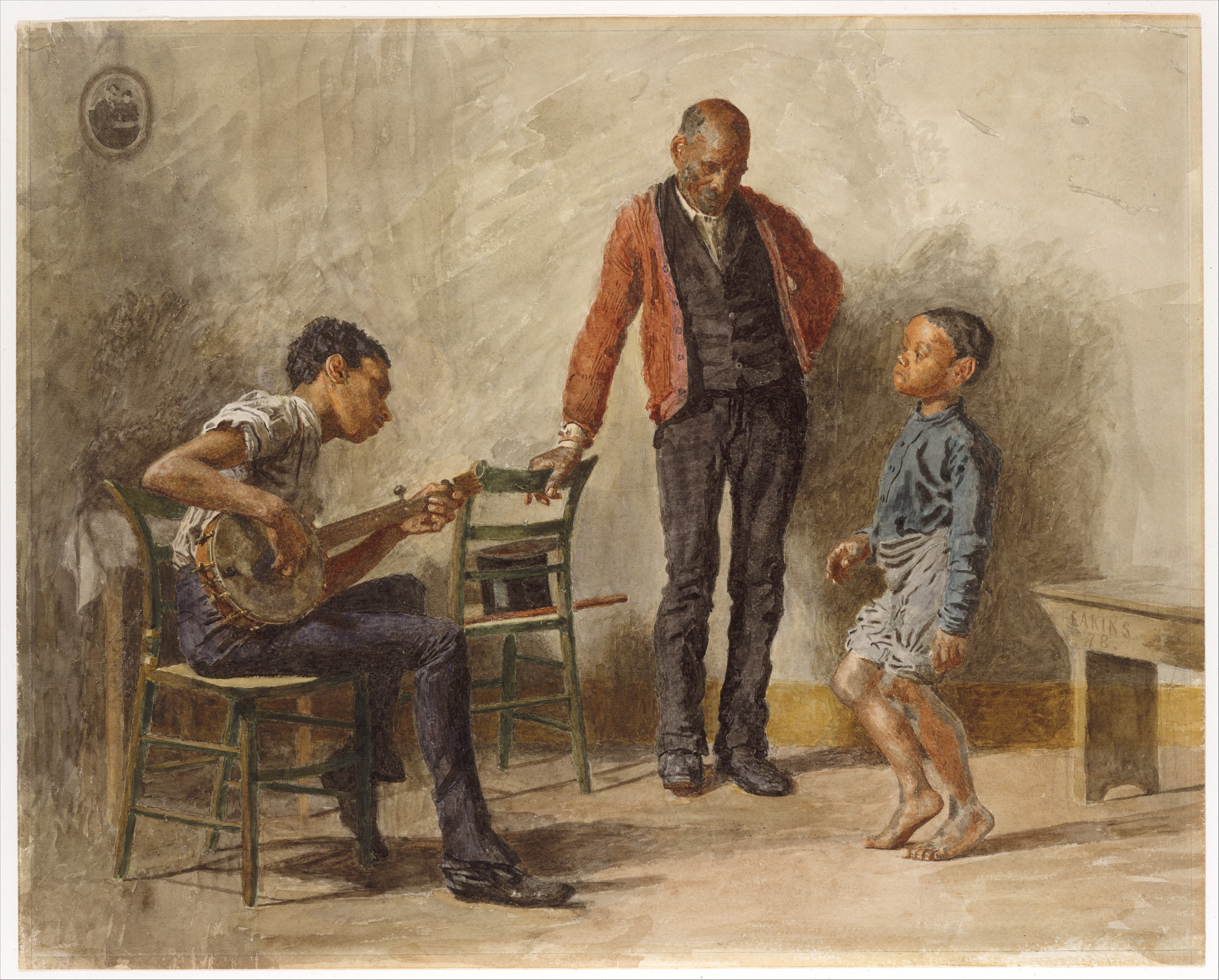
The Dancing Lesson by Thomas Eakins, 1878. Eakins taught Tanner while at the Pennsylvania Academy of the Fine Arts

Tanner's art training exposed him to "American Realism and French academic painting" at the Pennsylvania Academy of Fine Arts and at the Académie Julian in Paris.

In looking for a source of the subjects of the two paintings, there are two possibilities. One is the Blue Ridge Mountains of North Carolina. After failing to prosper in Atlanta drawing, taking photos and teaching, he spent the summer of 1888 in Highlands, North Carolina, in the Blue Ridge Mountains. In that time period, he sketched and likely made photographs the region's African-American residents. Alternatively, he could have found inspiration in Atlanta, where he lived for more than two years. After his summer in South Carolina, he returned to Atlanta for two years, during which he taught drawing. His patrons then bought his collection of artworks, providing enough money for him to move to Paris in 1891.

He enrolled in the Académie in Paris about 1891, and while there painted African American subjects in The Banjo Lesson (1893) and The Thankful Poor (1894). Judith Wilson contends that Tanner "lifted what Du Bois would call 'the Veil of Race' to give art audiences an unprecedented 'inside look' at Afro-American culture".

Researchers looking for his artistic inspirations have also looked to European artists. Farisa Khalid draws explicit parallels with several Old Master paintings, including Domenico Ghirlandaio's c.1490 An Old Man and his Grandson, and Johannes Vermeer's c.1662-1663 Woman with a Lute, as well as the more contemporary peasant works of Jean-François Millet, such as his 1857-59 painting The Angelus.

=== Stereotypes refuted using art ===
The extent to which Tanner continued to see himself as a black man, and the extent to which he "passed" in France, is debated.

As W.S Scarborough of Wilberforce University wrote in 1902, "When "The Banjo Lesson" appears, many of the friends of the race sincerely hoped that a portrayer of Negro life by a Negro artist had arisen indeed. They hoped, too, that the treatment of race subjects by him would serve to counterbalance so much that has made the race only a laughingstock subject for those artists who see nothing in it but the most extravagantly absurd and grotesque. But this was not to be."

Tanner rejected the notion that he had to choose, that he was either black or white:

Now am I a Negro? Does not the 3/4 of English blood in my veins...does this not count for anything? Does the 1/4 or 1/8 of "pure" Negro blood in my veins count for all? I believe it, the Negro blood counts and counts to my advantage ... but that it is the source of all my talents...I do not believe, any more than I believe it all comes from my English ancestors.

— Henry Ossawa Tanner, "Henry Ossawa Tanner's Subversion of Genre", . Albert Boime, The Art Bulletin, volume 75, page 418 (September 1993)

When Tanner returned to the United States after spending two years in France, he stepped into a country in which "race hatred" was flourishing and the "negative depictions of African Americans through minstrel shows and other media were at a high point." His answer came in the form of his only two well-known paintings in which African Americans were the subject. The Banjo Lesson took on the stereotype directly. In it, Tanner subverts the stereotypical images of caricatured cheerful minstrels playing the banjo and dancing, and tropes of innate black musicality, portraying instead a calm and sentimental domestic scene with one generation passing on their knowledge and instructing another.

The painting contradicts the minstrel show presentation of the banjo, by using the musical instrument for "thoughtful art" and not as a "comical prop." The painting contradicts stereotypes of African Americans as well; instead of showing natural musicality, the painting instead shows a process of learning, and "emphasizes the deliberate care and concentration required" to learn a musical instrument. Further, both the teacher and students are "equally engaged in a transmission", as cultural knowledge is passed from generation to generation.

The Banjo Lesson is further subversive in that, for a white audience to understand it, they would have had to put aside racial beliefs.

== Reception ==
Tanner returned to Paris, where The Banjo Lesson was his first work to be accepted at the Paris Salon in 1894 (an earlier work that he submitted in 1892, perhaps a version of The Bagpipe Lesson, had been rejected). Despite his success, Tanner turned away from depictions of African-Americans, finding more critical and commercial success with landscape paintings and biblical scenes. A retrospective exhibition in New York in 1908 did not include The Banjo Lesson.

The painting was bought by Robert Curtis Ogden, who donated it to the Hampton Institute (now Hampton University) in November 1894, and it remains in the collection of the Hampton University Museum, in Hampton, Virginia. A similar painting The Bagpipe Lesson, 1892, depicting a youth practising to play the bagpipes beside a flowering apple tree in northern France, was also presented to the Hampton Institute in 1894; there is a study in the Smithsonian American Art Museum.

Tanner enlisted with the American Red Cross in France in 1917, and served as a lieutenant in ambulances in the First World War. He was later awarded the French Legion d'Honneur for his war work. Three of his paintings were bought by the French government for the Musée du Luxembourg, and these works - The Resurrection of Lazarus, The Disciples at Emmaus, and Christ and His Disciples on the Bethany Road - are now in the Musée d'Orsay.

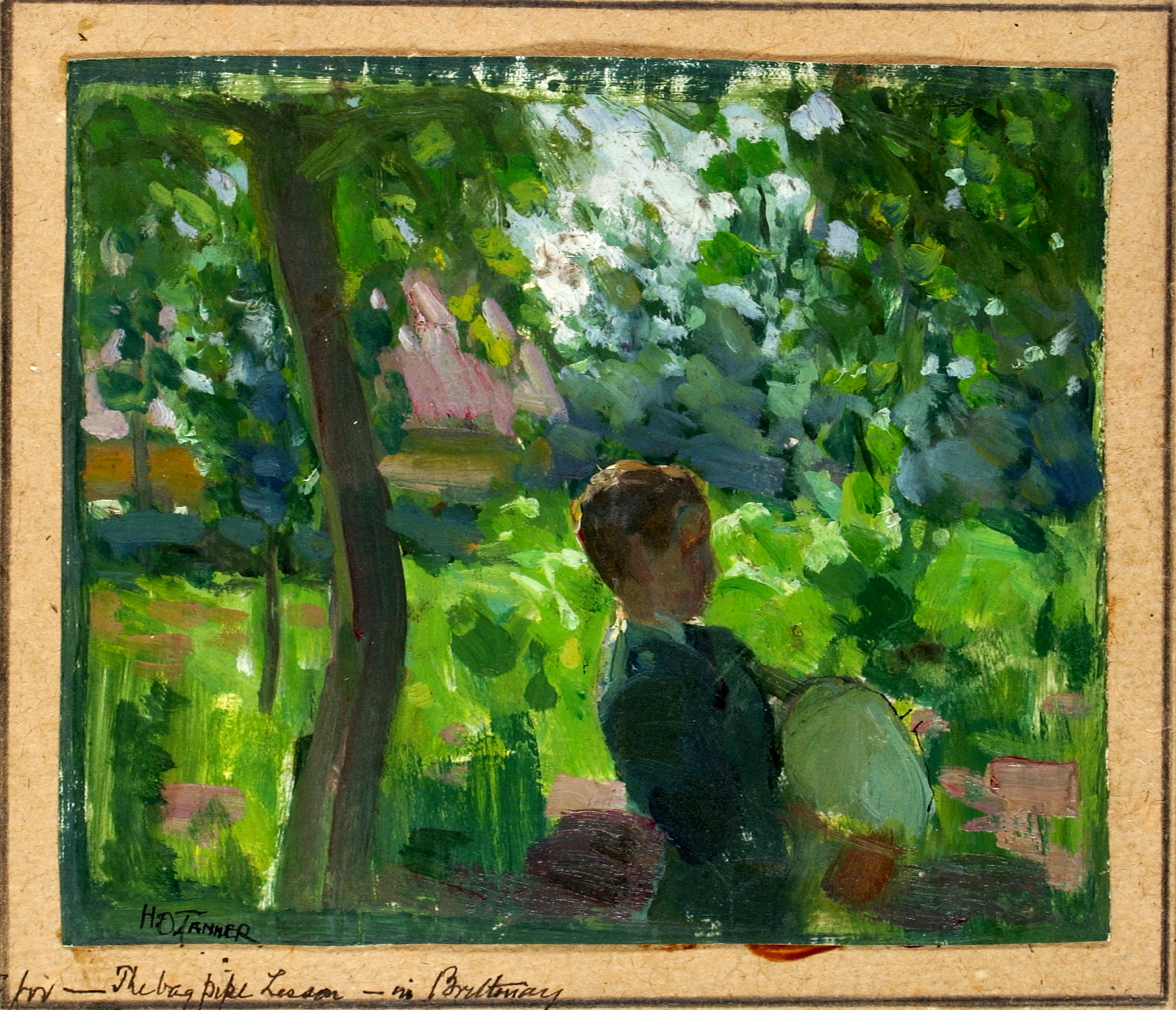
Study for The Bagpipe Lesson, 1892, Smithsonian American Art Museum

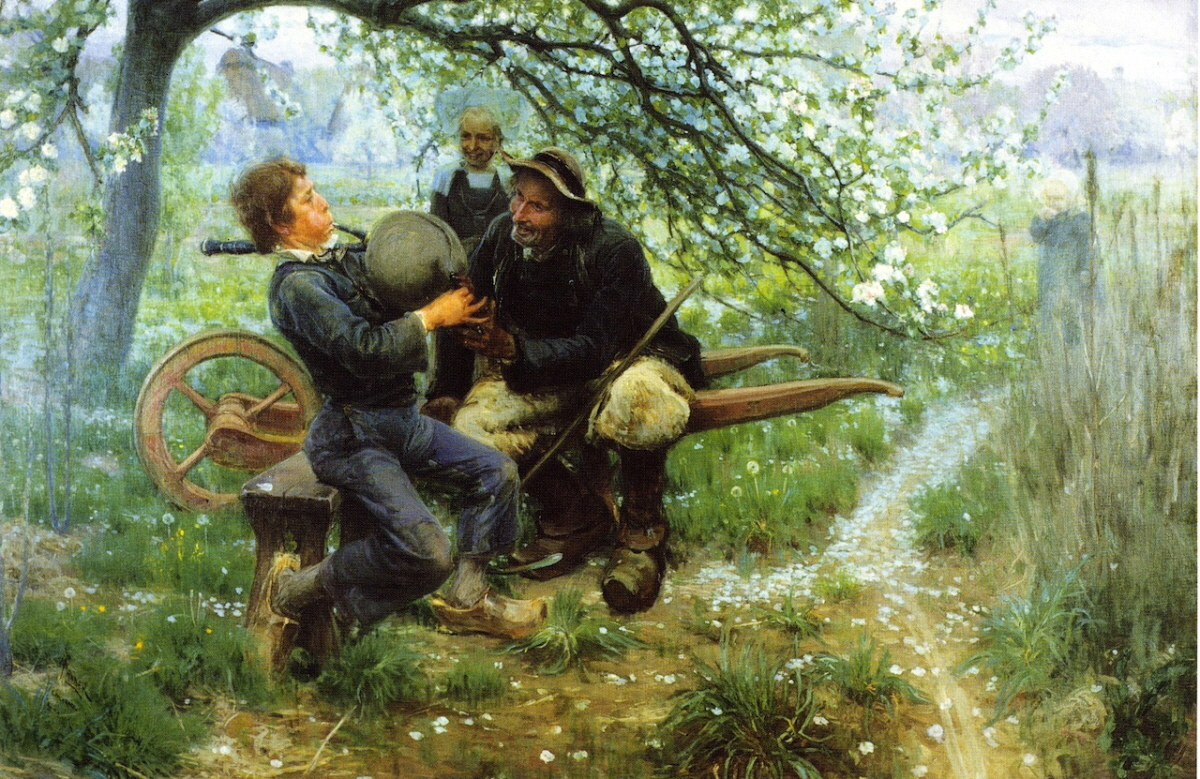
The Bagpipe Lesson, a painting by Henry Ossawa Tanner, 1892. The image was begun in Brittany and finished in the United States.

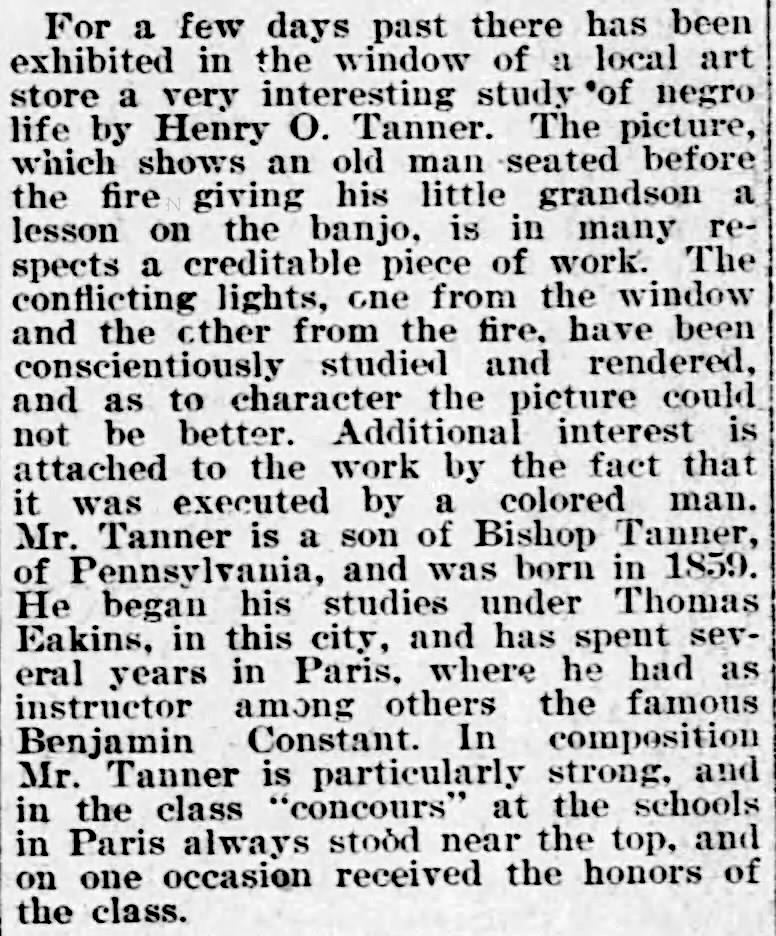
The Banjo Lesson reviewed November 12, 1893 in The Philadelphia Inquirer

== See also ==
- List of paintings by Henry Ossawa Tanner
