= The Bagpipe Lesson =

Painting by Henry Ossawa Tanner

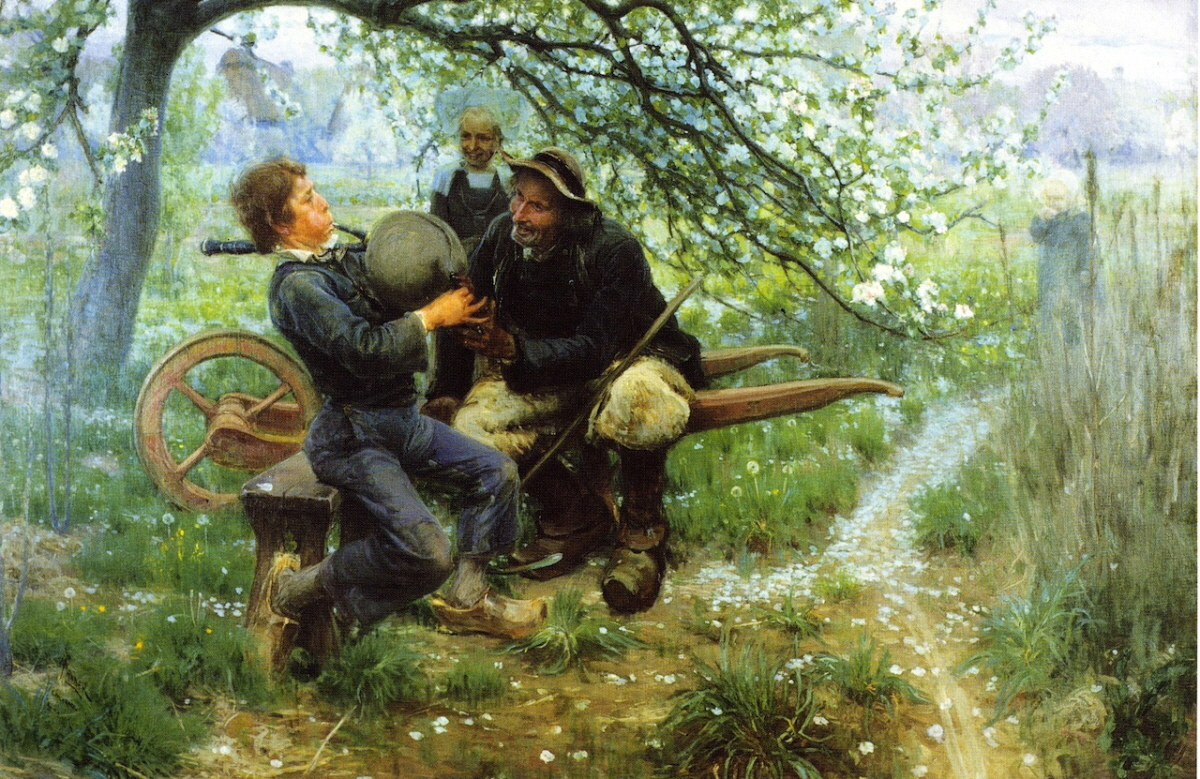
- The Bagpipe Lesson, a painting by Henry Ossawa Tanner. The image was begun in Brittany in 1892 and finished in the United States.
- Artist: Henry Ossawa Tanner
- Completion date: 1893
- Medium: oil
- Movement: French Academic art
- Subject: boy learning bagpipe with father
- Location: Hampton University Museum, Hampton, Virginia, USA

The Bagpipe Lesson is a painting by Henry Ossawa Tanner, completed in late 1893 and displayed at the World's Columbian Exposition (May — October 1893) and at the Pennsylvania Academy of the Fine Arts 63rd annual exhibition, held from December 18, 1893 to February 24, 1894. The painting was begun by Tanner during his first summer in France, during a trip to Brittany. He finished the work in Philadelphia.

The picture shows a father teaching his son to play the bagpipe, and the intensity of the man with the "spasmodic efforts" of his son brings humor to the work. In parts of America, this was more widely popular in the 1890s than was The Banjo Lesson, due to sensitivity over racial relations.

== Reaction ==
=== Academy ===
The painting made an impression at the exhibition, enough that it was one of three images from the 63rd Academy printed in the Philadelphia Inquirer. It was also one of the 40 images chosen to be engraved for the event's catalog. It was one of three paintings of Tanner's to be talked about in the Philadelphia newspapers in 1894, the other two being The Thankful Poor and The Banjo Lesson.

=== Paris Salon versus Cotton States International Exposition ===
It was also displayed at the 1895 Cotton States and International Exposition (September-December 1895) in Atlanta, where it won a medal.

In the United States, The Bagpipe Lesson was the painting that "brought H. O. Tanner to the front as an artist." The painting is an example of Tanner's skill painting in "French Academic Style." It has been described as a work "typical" of that produced by American artists learning the French style. However, it was important in that it was painted about the same time as The Banjo Lesson and The Thankful Poor, works in which Tanner made a "conceptual transformation" by applying it to African Americans. Judges at the Paris Salon saw that transformation, allowing the Banjo Lesson to be his first Salon entry in the spring of 1894.

Reaction to Tanner's works may be based on place. At Paris, although not a popular painting, Tanner's The Banjo Lesson won admission into the Paris Salon and was displayed with all the other Salon-accepted paintings. In the Atlanta Exposition, The Bagpipe Lesson which was "devoid of race" was the medal-winning artwork, while The Banjo Lesson was placed in a special "Negro building" where it would only be seen by those interested in African American art.

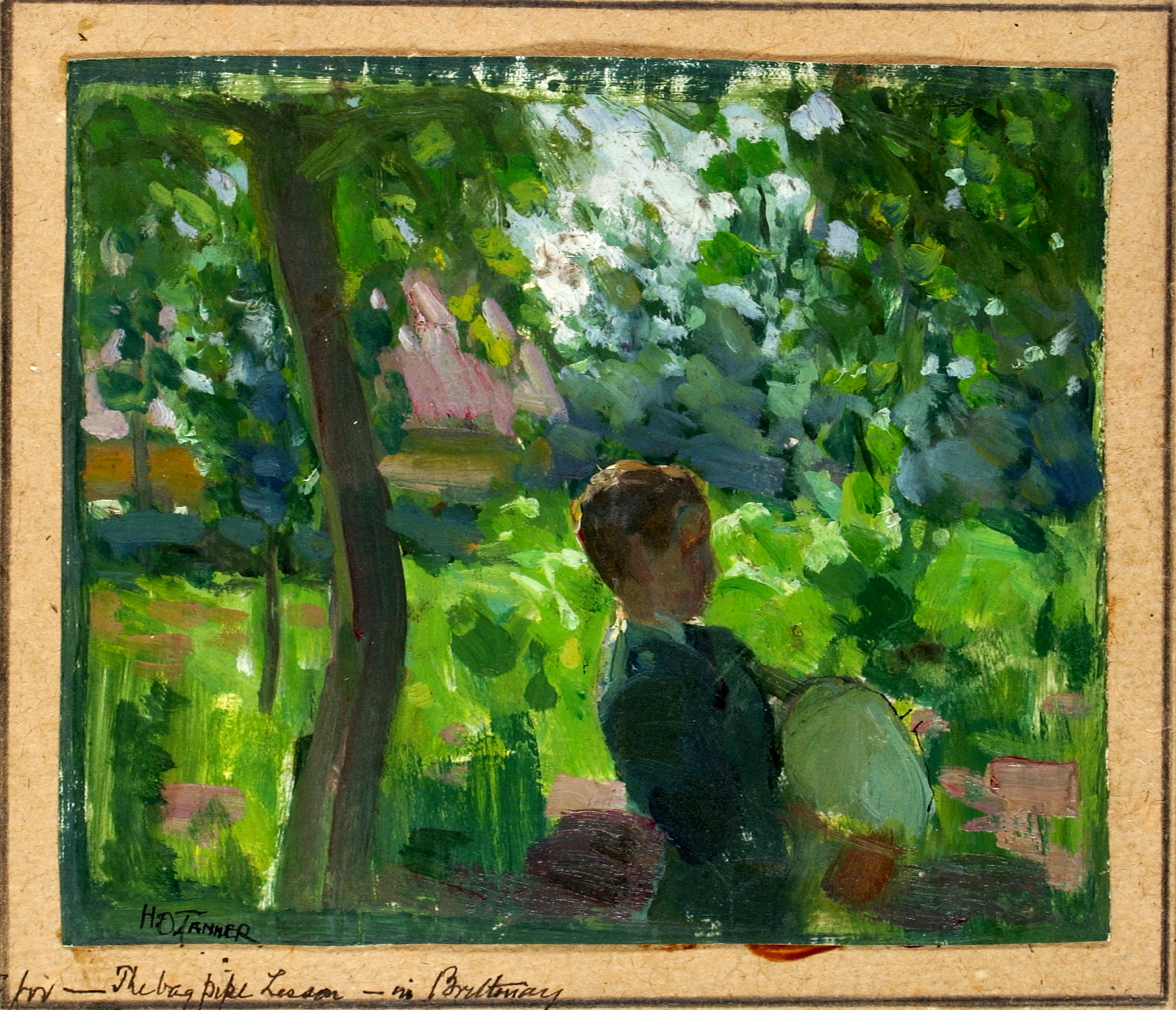
Study for The Bagpipe Lesson, 1892, Smithsonian American Art Museum

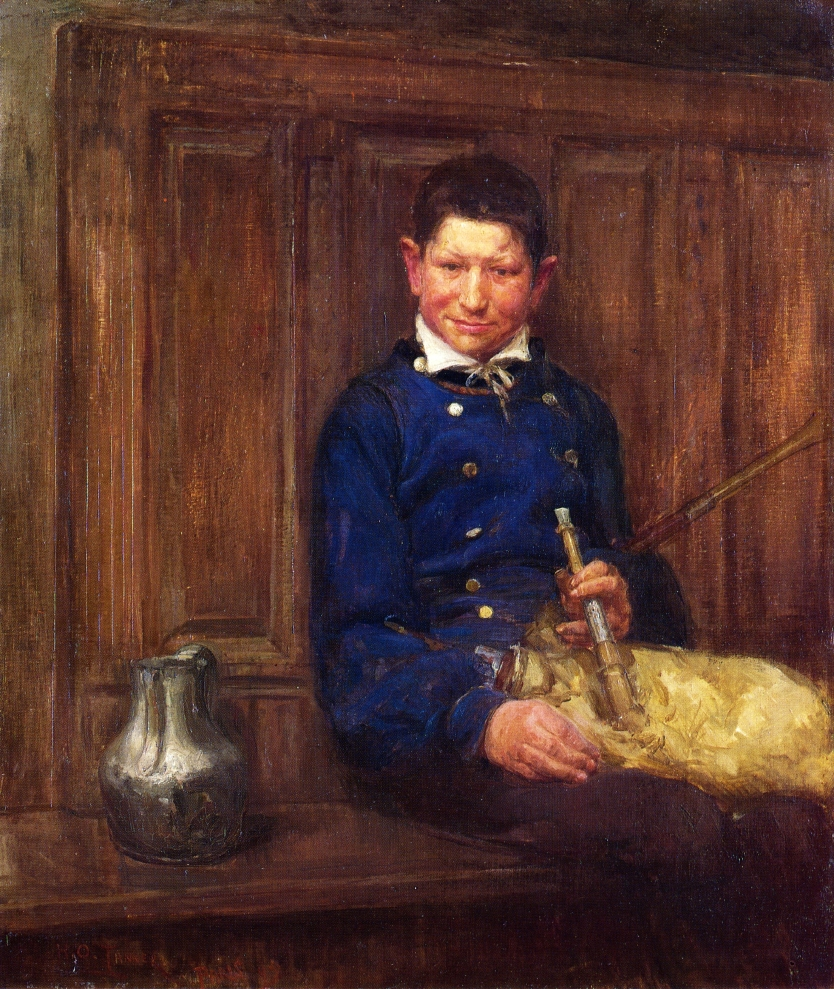
The Bagpipe Player, c. 1895.

== See also ==
- List of paintings by Henry Ossawa Tanner
