= The Thankful Poor =

Painting by Henry Ossawa Tanner

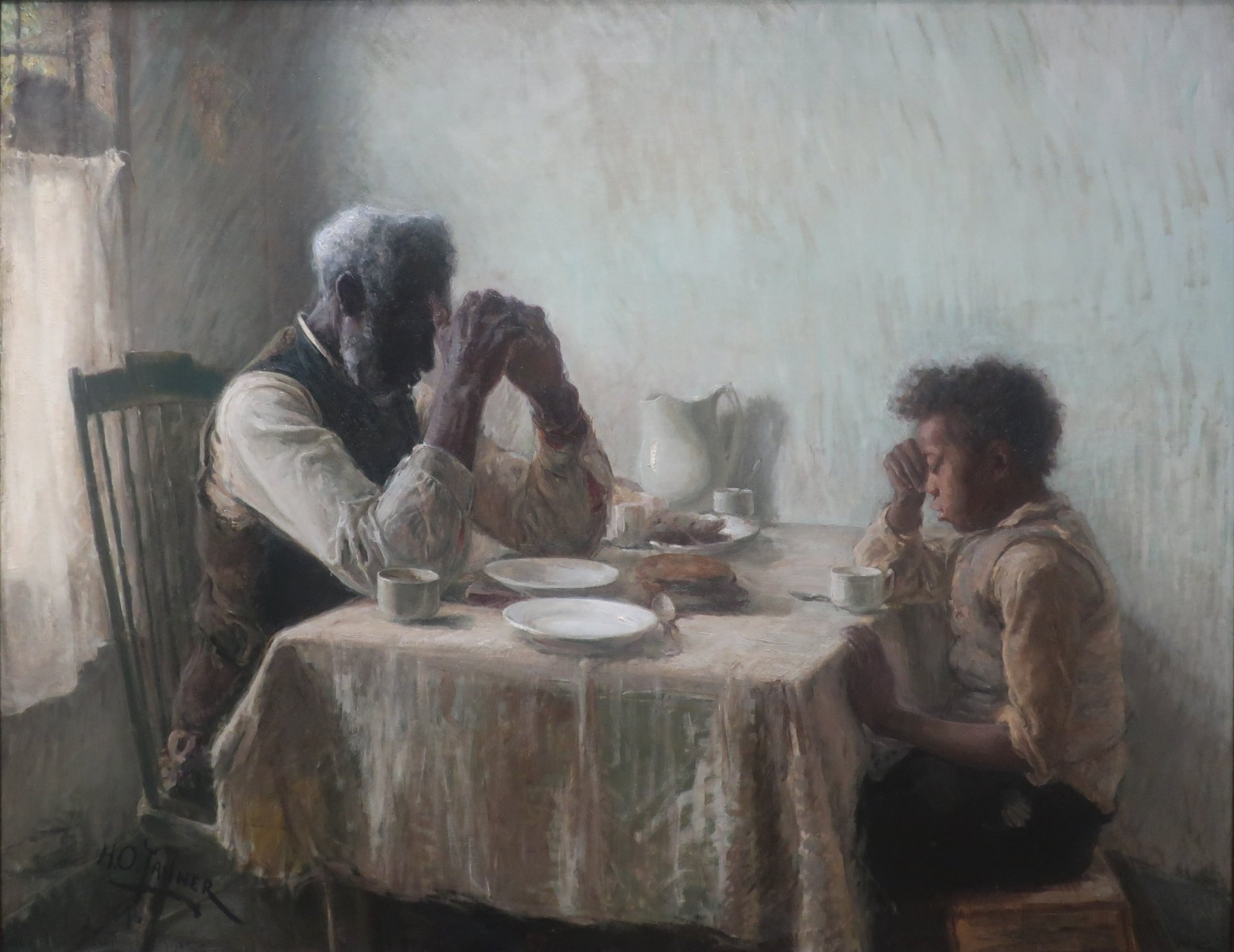
- Artist: Henry Ossawa Tanner
- Year: 1894
- Medium: Oil on canvas
- Dimensions: 90 cm × 112.4 cm (35.5 in × 44.25 in)
- Owner: Art Bridges

The Thankful Poor is an 1894 genre painting by the African-American painter Henry Ossawa Tanner. It depicts two African Americans praying at a table, and shares common themes with Tanner's other paintings from the 1890s including The Banjo Lesson (1893) and The Young Sabot Maker (1895). The work is based on photographs Tanner had taken, and is influenced by his views on education and race, which were in turn derived from those of his father, Benjamin Tucker Tanner, and the African Methodist Episcopal Church. The painting is considered a milestone in African-American art, notably for its countering of racial stereotypes.

Following his return to the United States in 1893, Tanner became more racially aware and chose to use artwork including The Thankful Poor as a means of portraying African-American culture in a dignified manner. The painting received praise from critics upon its exhibition in Philadelphia during the spring of 1894, but it is also Tanner's last African-American genre work as the artist began to focus on biblical scenes.

After remaining hidden for years, the painting was discovered in a storage closet of the Pennsylvania School for the Deaf in 1970, before being purchased by Camille and Bill Cosby in 1981 for their private collection. In 2020, the painting was sold by the Cosbys to Art Bridges, a foundation created by Alice Walton for loaning artwork. The Thankful Poor has been exhibited at the National Museum of African Art, and a preparatory study is held by the DuSable Museum of African American History.

== Description ==
The Thankful Poor depicts an old man and a young boy—perhaps a grandfather and his grandson—at a table, praying before their meal. To the left, the scene's only source of light comes from the window with sheer curtains behind the old man. The old man sits on a high-backed chair with his elbows on the table and his hands clasped before his face in prayer. Across from the old man, the boy sits on a low bench or crate, one hand held to his head in an effort to emulate the man's prayerful pose. The table is set with a tablecloth, two white plates and cups, a large white pitcher, cutlery, and small portions of food. The painting is signed, dated, and titled to the lower left: "H.O. TANNER / 1894 / The Thankful Poor". The reverse contains an early study for Tanner's 1895 painting The Young Sabot Maker.

The composition possibly draws inspiration from American artist Elizabeth Nourse's 1891 painting Le Repas en Famille (The Family Meal), which shares a similar setting. Nourse's painting depicts a French peasant family gathered around a table, a scene that would be familiar to Tanner because he spent his time in France painting in the Brittany countryside where rural peasants were among his favorite subjects. Since Le Repas en Famille was exhibited at the 1893 World's Columbian Exposition where it won a gold medal, Tanner could have seen the painting when he visited Chicago that year to present a lecture at the World's Congress on Africa. There are also parallels in European art, such as Jan Steen's 1660 painting The Prayer Before the Meal.

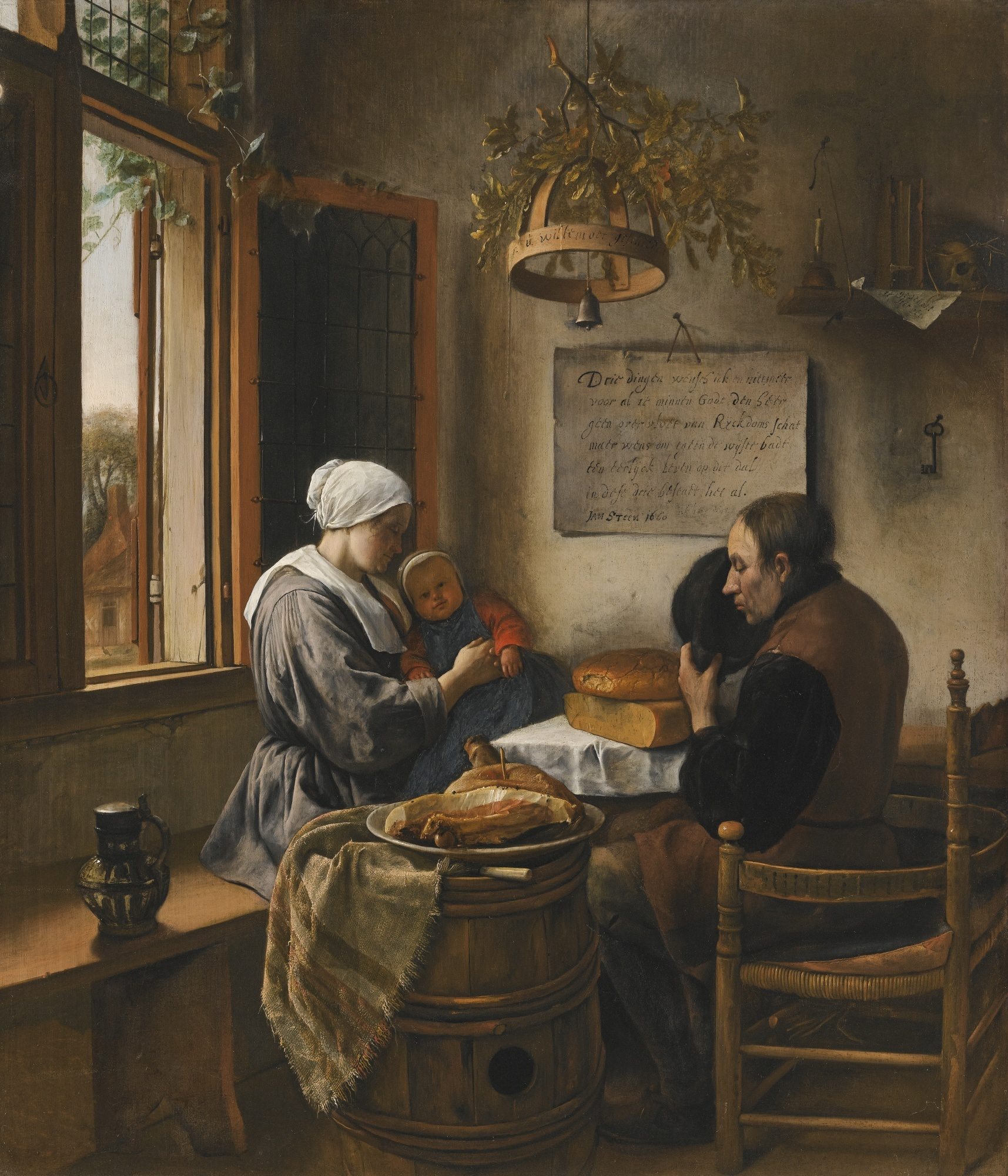
The Prayer Before the Meal (1660), Jan Steen

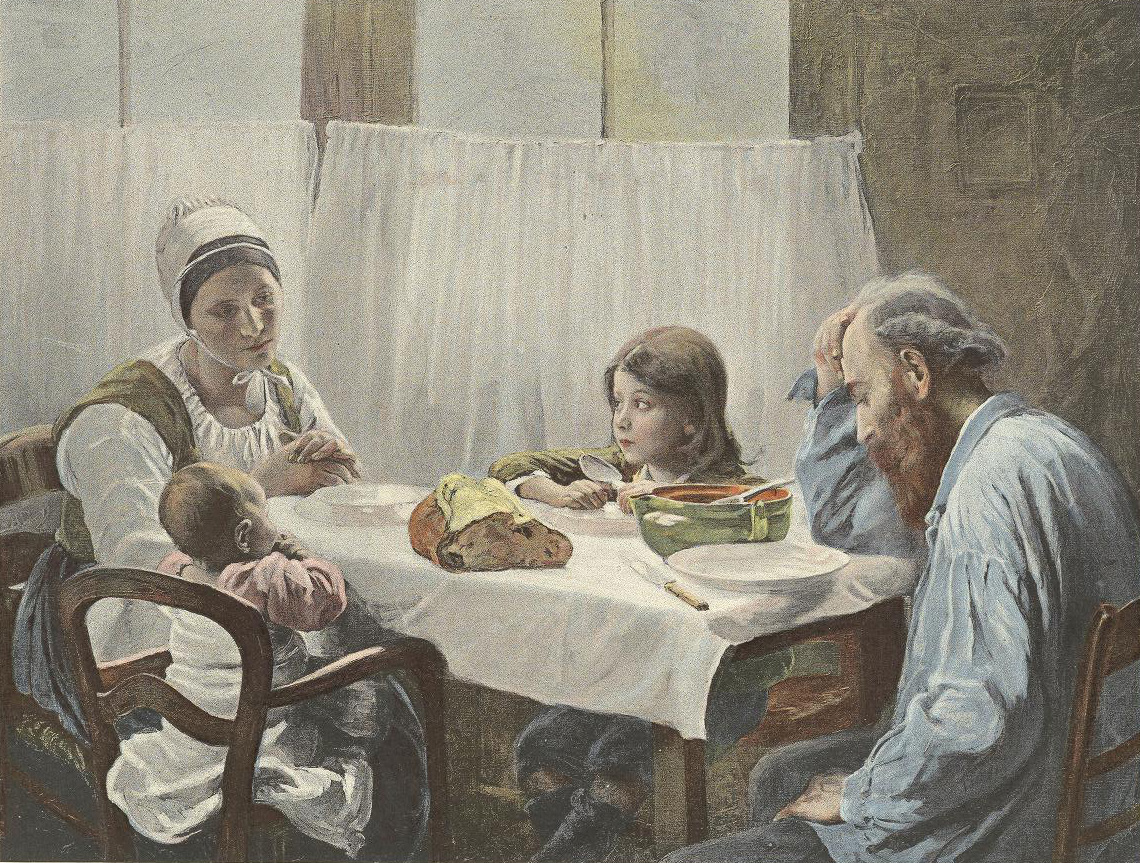
Le Repas en Famille (The Family Meal) (1891), Elizabeth Nourse

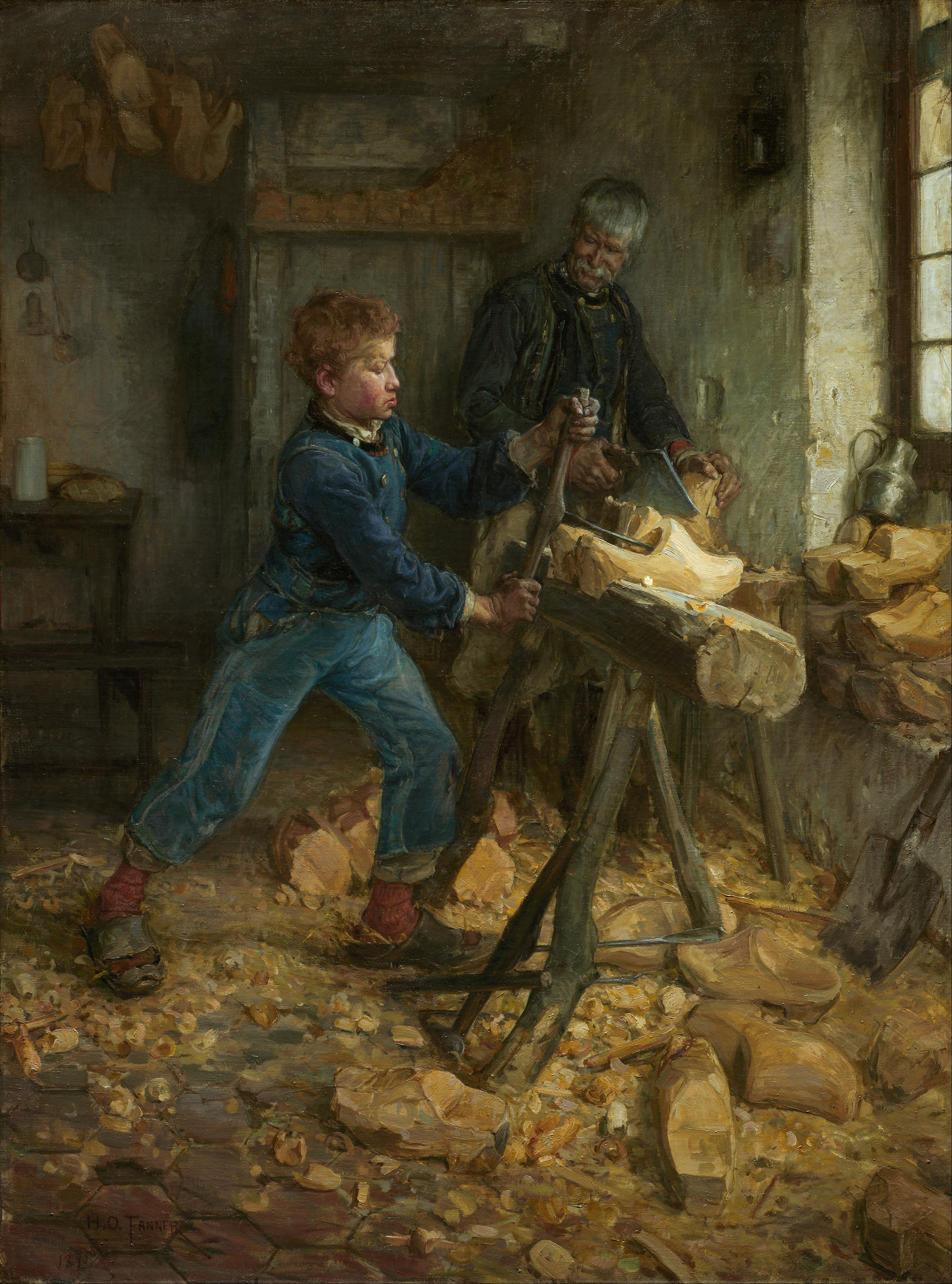
The Young Sabot Maker (1895), Henry Ossawa Tanner

== Background ==
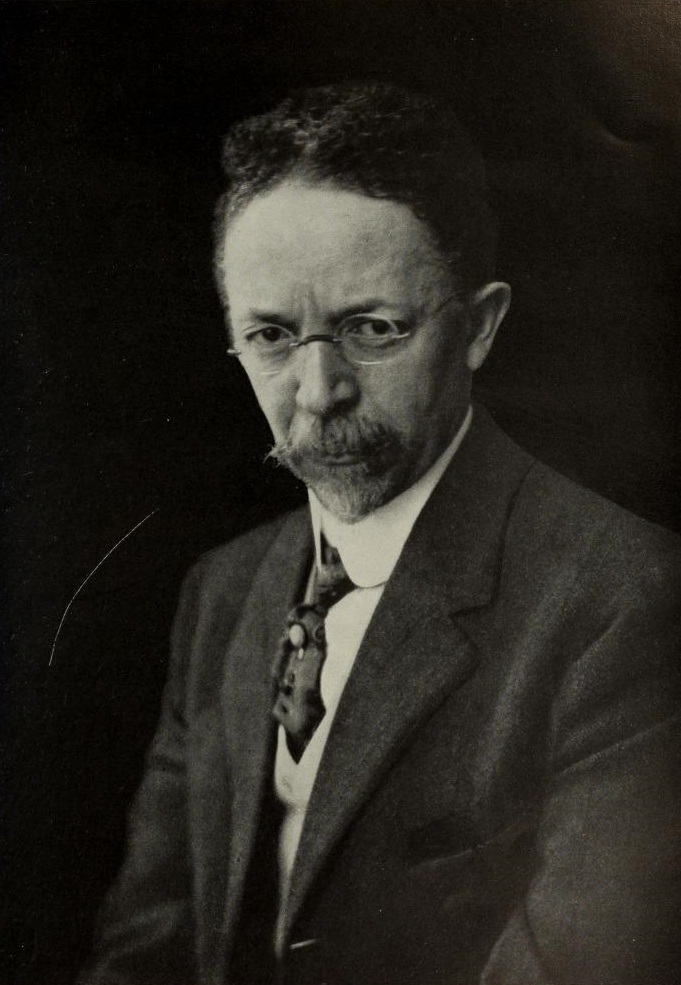
Henry Ossawa Tanner in 1909

Tanner's parents valued education, and these views informed his work. Both graduated from Avery College, managed schools, and ensured Tanner himself received a rigorous education. Tanner's father, Benjamin Tucker Tanner, was a bishop in the African Methodist Episcopal Church (AME); the denomination encouraged education among African Americans, and founded colleges. Tanner was further influenced by family friend and educator Booker T. Washington, with whom he shared the belief that skills that could support a living should be passed from one generation to another. Race was another factor that affected Tanner: he was influenced by his father's work, which included lectures on racial identity and church sermons that underscored a sense of racial injustice.

Beginning in the summer of 1888, Tanner spent time in Highlands, North Carolina, in the Blue Ridge Mountains where he hoped to earn a living through photography and improve his health. In 1889, he started a photography shop in Atlanta, Georgia, but returned in the summer to Highlands where he took photographs of local African Americans. The Thankful Poor and an earlier painting, The Banjo Lesson, both seem to be based on the same people Tanner had photographed in that period before he moved to Paris in 1891. Both paintings were made after Tanner returned to the United States in the summer of 1893 to recuperate from typhoid fever but prior to his return to Paris in 1894.

For The Thankful Poor, he made an oil on canvas study (c. 1894), which is in the DuSable Museum of African American History in Chicago as of 2021.

=== Tanner's depictions of African Americans ===
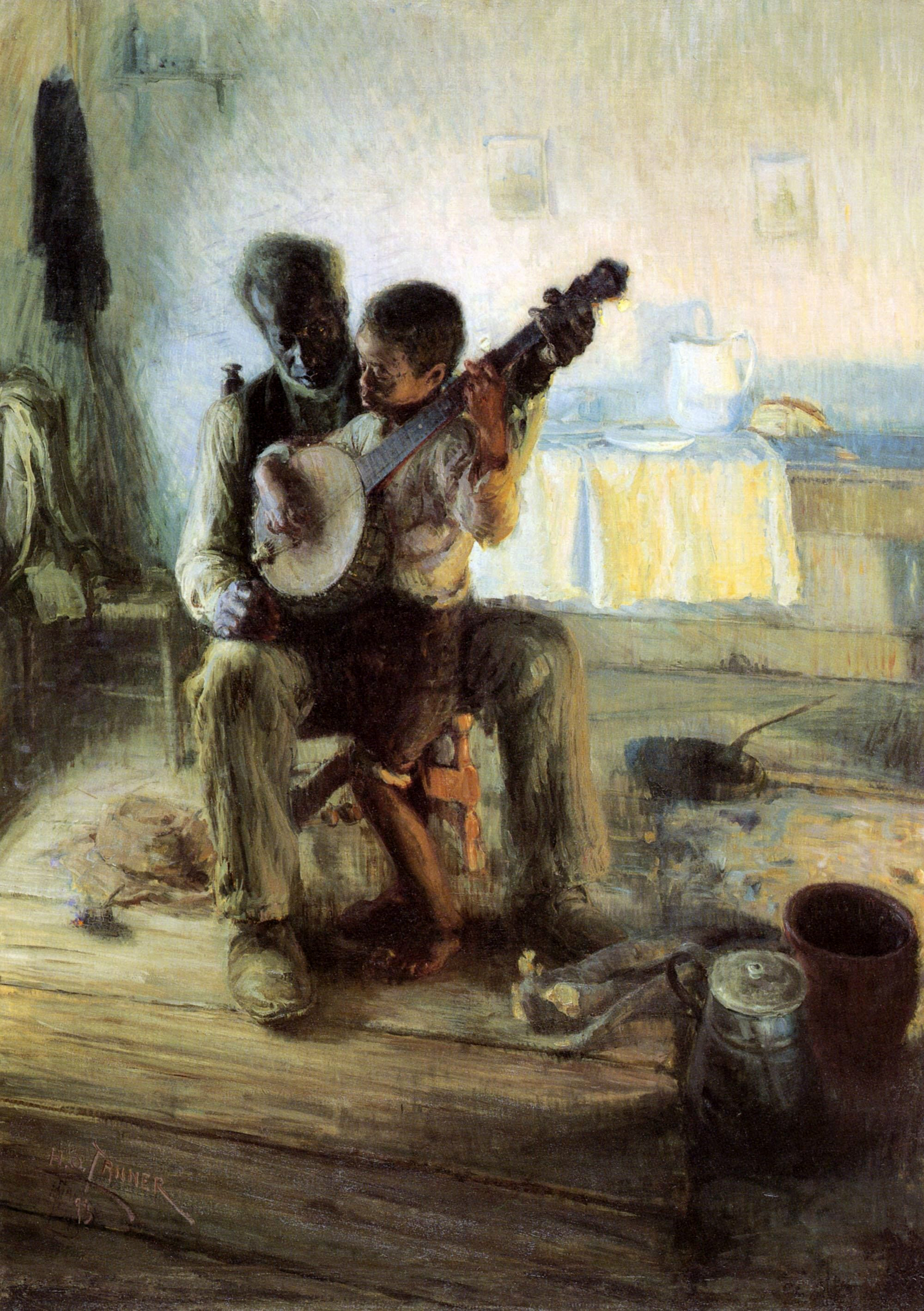
The Banjo Lesson (1893)

When Tanner returned to the United States in July 1893, he found that race relations had not improved during the previous two years. Particularly moved by the increasing number of lynchings of African Americans, Tanner became involved in the civil rights movement, and scholars believe he grew more racially aware. He turned towards African-American subject matters for his genre paintings, becoming the first African American to do so. Previous artistic depictions of African Americans mainly came from white painters, but Tanner considered many of these interpretations to be lacking. Thus, he decided to use his intimate knowledge of the subject to paint his own scenes of African-American life. Tanner himself wrote in the third person that:

Since his return from Europe he [Tanner] has painted mostly Negro subjects, he feels drawn to such subjects on account of the newness of the field and because of the desire to represent the serious, and pathetic side of life among them, and it is his thought that other things being equal, he who has the most sympathy with his subjects will obtain the best results. To his mind many of the artists who have represented Negro life have only seen the comic, the ludicrous side of it, and have lacked the sympathy with and appreciation for the warm big heart that dwells within such a rough exterior. (Note: This handwritten statement was written by Tanner likely between 1893 and 1894. The note is in the files of the Pennsylvania School for the Deaf.)

Tanner's first major genre work featuring African Americans was The Banjo Lesson, (Note: Tanner may have made sketches and paintings during the summer of 1889, including a genre scene of "an old colored man taking his little cotton to market on a rattletrap ox-cart" that predates The Banjo Lesson, but these paintings have yet to be found.) which he completed by October 1893. The painting's depiction of a young boy being taught to play the banjo by an old man undermines the banjo's popular association with simplistic black minstrels by instead portraying a "genuine sharing of black cultural tradition." Some critics seemed unaware of Tanner's intention to subvert conventional stereotypes of African Americans. For example, an art writer for the Philadelphia Daily Evening Telegraph, though praising Tanner's artistic technique, referred to the painting's elderly subject as "an old Uncle Ned". (Note: The term "Uncle Ned" carries a negative connotation towards African Americans. For example, American sculptor John Rogers's 1866 sculptural group Uncle Ned's School caricatures a futile attempt at teaching an African American to read and has been read as a criticism of Reconstruction era efforts to educate African Americans.) The art historian Naurice Frank Woods believes that such derogatory responses to The Banjo Lesson led Tanner to question whether his paintings could effect any change on the public's perception of African Americans. Nevertheless, The Thankful Poor would see Tanner incorporate his beliefs on education and race in another attempt at placing African-American culture in a positive light.

== History ==
=== Initial reception and role in Tanner's career ===
Sometime from January to April 1894, Tanner completed the painting, which was exhibited with The Banjo Lesson from April 28 to May 5, 1894 at the James S. Earle and Sons Gallery in Philadelphia. Tanner received favorable reviews from critics, one of whom called The Thankful Poor "an important work" and praised its execution. Still, an otherwise commendatory review of Tanner's painting in The Philadelphia Inquirer was racially slanted and used a pejorative term to describe the elderly man. The art correspondent who wrote that review possibly wrote the similarly praiseful but stereotyped review of The Banjo Lesson a year earlier. On Tanner's return to Paris in 1894, The Banjo Lesson became his first accepted work at the Paris Salon where it received an honorable place. The Thankful Poor did not enjoy a similar reception. Woods writes that "while [The Banjo Lesson] has remained the subject of intense scholarly scrutiny and public adoration, [The Thankful Poor] has lingered, undeservedly, in its iconic shadow."

Following the showing of The Banjo Lesson, many—including family friend and leading African-American scholar William Sanders Scarborough—expected Tanner to continue counteracting black stereotypes through his art. Scarborough himself commented, "... many of the friends of the race sincerely hoped that a portrayer of Negro Life by a Negro artist had arisen indeed ... to counterbalance ... the most extravagantly absurd and grotesque." Despite his support and critical success, Tanner moved away from painting African Americans after completing The Thankful Poor, thus making the work Tanner's last known genre scene of this type. Woods hypothesizes that a lack of sales coupled with derogatory racial references from reviews such as the one in The Philadelphia Inquirer led Tanner to consider his two genre paintings as "a failed experiment." Woods notes that the acceptance of The Banjo Lesson into the Salon did little to promote sales of Tanner's genre works in the United States. As such, Tanner "simply moved on" to other subjects. Scarborough also suggests that Tanner's rejection of black subjects stemmed from both his religious convictions and his father's desire for him to become a religious painter. In the years following The Thankful Poor, Tanner did become a religious painter, finding more critical and commercial success with biblical scenes. Tanner said of this shift:

It is not by accident that I have chosen to be a religious painter. I have no doubt of an inheritance of religious feeling, and for this I am glad, but I have also decided and I hope an intelligent religious faith not due to inheritance but my own conviction. I believe my religion. I have chosen the character of my art because it conveys my message and tells what I want to tell my own generation and leave to the future.

Though Tanner did not mention The Thankful Poor in his autobiography and interviews, the painting is considered one of his most significant. In his 2017 biography of Tanner, Woods assesses the painting to be "the first to explore fully African American religiosity" and the "harbinger" of Tanner's later religious works. He concludes that the painting is the "key transitional work to the 'deeper things' that would guide [Tanner] to a successful career."

=== Provenance and exhibition history ===
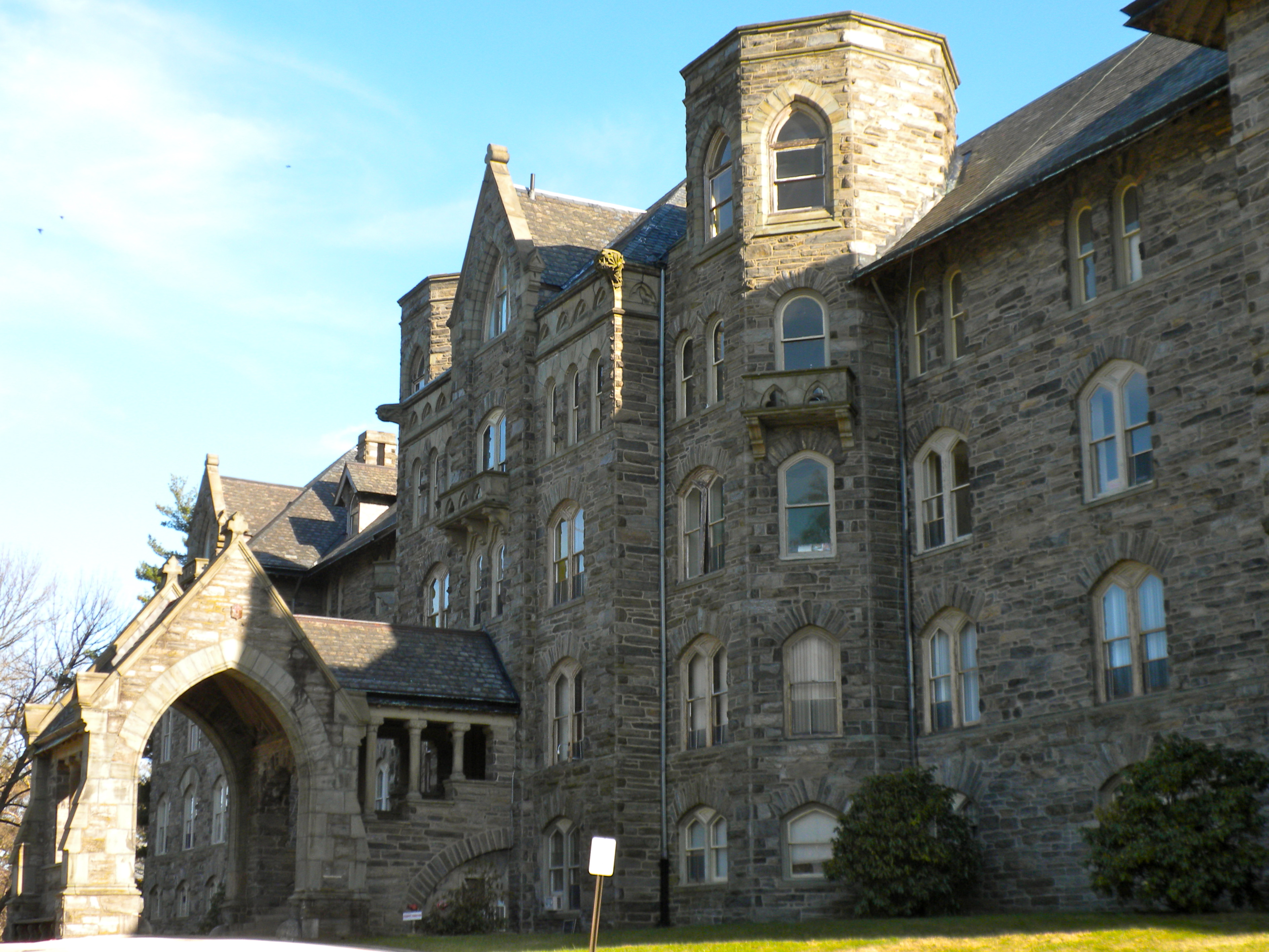
Pennsylvania School for the Deaf

In December 1893, while his painting The Bagpipe Lesson was on display at the Pennsylvania Academy of the Fine Arts in Philadelphia, Tanner met John T. Morris, head of the academy's exhibitions committee. Morris then bought The Thankful Poor in October 1894 when Tanner auctioned off all of his work to pay for his return to France. Morris loaned the painting to the Pennsylvania School for the Deaf, where he was a board member, and then bequeathed it to the school on his death in 1915. The work sat unnoticed in the school's basement for half a century until 1970, when it was discovered in a storage closet by the headmaster Philip Bellefleur. It was given on loan to the Philadelphia Museum of Art before being sold in a December 1981 Sotheby's auction to Camille Cosby, as a Christmas present for her husband, the comedian Bill Cosby. The art curator David Driskell bid for the Cosbys at the auction and reached a top bid of US$250,000 (Note: Sources disagree on what the painting's final price, including buyer's premium, was; one says it was US$280,500 while another claims it was as high as US$287,000. The previous auction record for The Thankful Poor was US$40,000.)—a record sum at the time for a painting by an African American. (Note: This record amount was surpassed in 1998 when Jean-Michel Basquiat's Self-Portrait was sold for US$3.3 million at a Christie's auction.)

The study for The Thankful Poor was part of the June 25 to August 20, 1995 exhibition "Across Continents and Cultures" at the Nelson-Atkins Museum of Art in Kansas City, Missouri. The exhibition was devoted to Tanner's works and was subsequently on view at the Dallas Museum of Art in Texas and the Terra Museum of American Art in Chicago. In 2014, the Cosbys loaned The Thankful Poor itself from their private collection to the National Museum of African Art in Washington, D.C. as part of the museum's "Conversations: African and African American Artworks in Dialogue" exhibition, which ran from November 9, 2014 to January 24, 2016. In 2016, the study was featured at the DuSable Museum of African American History in an exhibition called the "DuSable Masterworks Collection". The exhibit celebrated the works of African-American artists like Tanner from the late 19th to the mid-20th centuries. In 2020, the Cosbys sold the painting privately via the M. Hanks Gallery to Alice Walton's nonprofit foundation Art Bridges, which loans artworks to American art exhibitions. Art Bridges lent the painting to the Dallas Museum of Art for a Tanner exhibition lasting from August 17, 2021 to January 2, 2022. The foundation also supported a conservation treatment and technical study of the painting conducted by the museum's paintings conservator in 2021. Since then, the painting has also been exhibited on loan at the Memphis Brooks Museum of Art and the Metropolitan Museum of Art.

== Interpretation ==
=== Depiction of African Americans ===
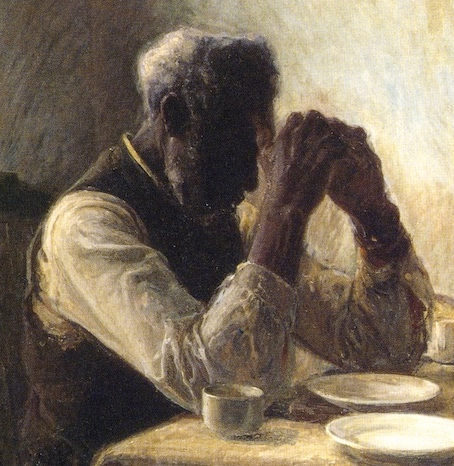
Detail of the old man

Though underpinned with religious undertones, The Thankful Poor does not portray a biblical subject like Tanner's later religious paintings. Rather, the genre painting depicts a daily ritual for impoverished African Americans through a realistic scene. This "inside look" into African-American religious custom depicts its subjects with a level of dignity and self-possession that has been described as "extraordinary" for Tanner's time.

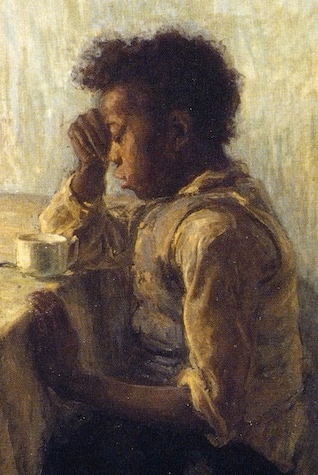
Detail of the boy

Tanner's stylistic choice for his genre paintings breaks from the typical late 19th century derogatory caricatures of African American. Contemporary representations usually mocked African-American religious practice as tribal and superstitious, in contrast to a supposedly more advanced, introspective, and contemplative white religiosity. Therefore, The Thankful Poor's calm portrayal of everyday Christian devotions in a modest setting challenges contemporary perceptions of black religiosity as overly emotional and inferior. The subject may also reflect the particular reverence for Thanksgiving Day in the AME. According to Woods, the tenets of the AME and the intrinsic messages in Bishop Tanner's writings and sermons coincide with the painting's intended purpose of dispelling negative visual stereotypes and racial divisions.

In the catalog of the 1991 exhibition of Tanner's work at the Philadelphia Museum of Art, (Note: The Thankful Poor was covered in the catalog but was not part of the exhibition.) The Thankful Poor is designated as a "dignified portrayal of the old man and boy at prayer [that] transcends any other image of black Americans in American art." The National Museum of African Art's "Conversations" exhibition describes Tanner's depiction of his subjects as "intimate" and "human"—and deems the painting to be a "milestone" in the history of African-American art.

=== Connections to other works by Tanner ===
The Banjo Lesson exhibits a realism and respect for its subjects similar to that of The Thankful Poor. The two works share a domestic setting and an emphasis on intergenerational relationships. Moreover, there is a common theme of education: the education in The Banjo Lesson is a musical lesson while the education in The Thankful Poor is a young boy imitating his elder's praying. These similarities suggest that Tanner intended for the two paintings to be a pair that "should be read together." Likewise, Woods writes that both paintings "remain inextricably linked in creative motivation, technical execution, and attention to race matters ...", and the art historian Judith Wilson refers to the pair as "an interlocking set of arguments."

The art historian Albert Boime believes that the study of The Young Sabot Maker on the reverse is no coincidence. He suggests that there is thematic continuity between the two paintings, evidenced by the presence of an elder and a youth in both works. Though the final version of The Young Sabot Maker does not feature African Americans like The Thankful Poor, Boime notes that in the final study for the former, both the apprentice and the master "appear to be of African-American descent." Similarities continue in the underlying theme of education, which The Young Sabot Maker shares with both The Thankful Poor and The Banjo Lesson.

== See also ==
- List of paintings by Henry Ossawa Tanner
