= Sabot (shoe) =

Wooden shoe

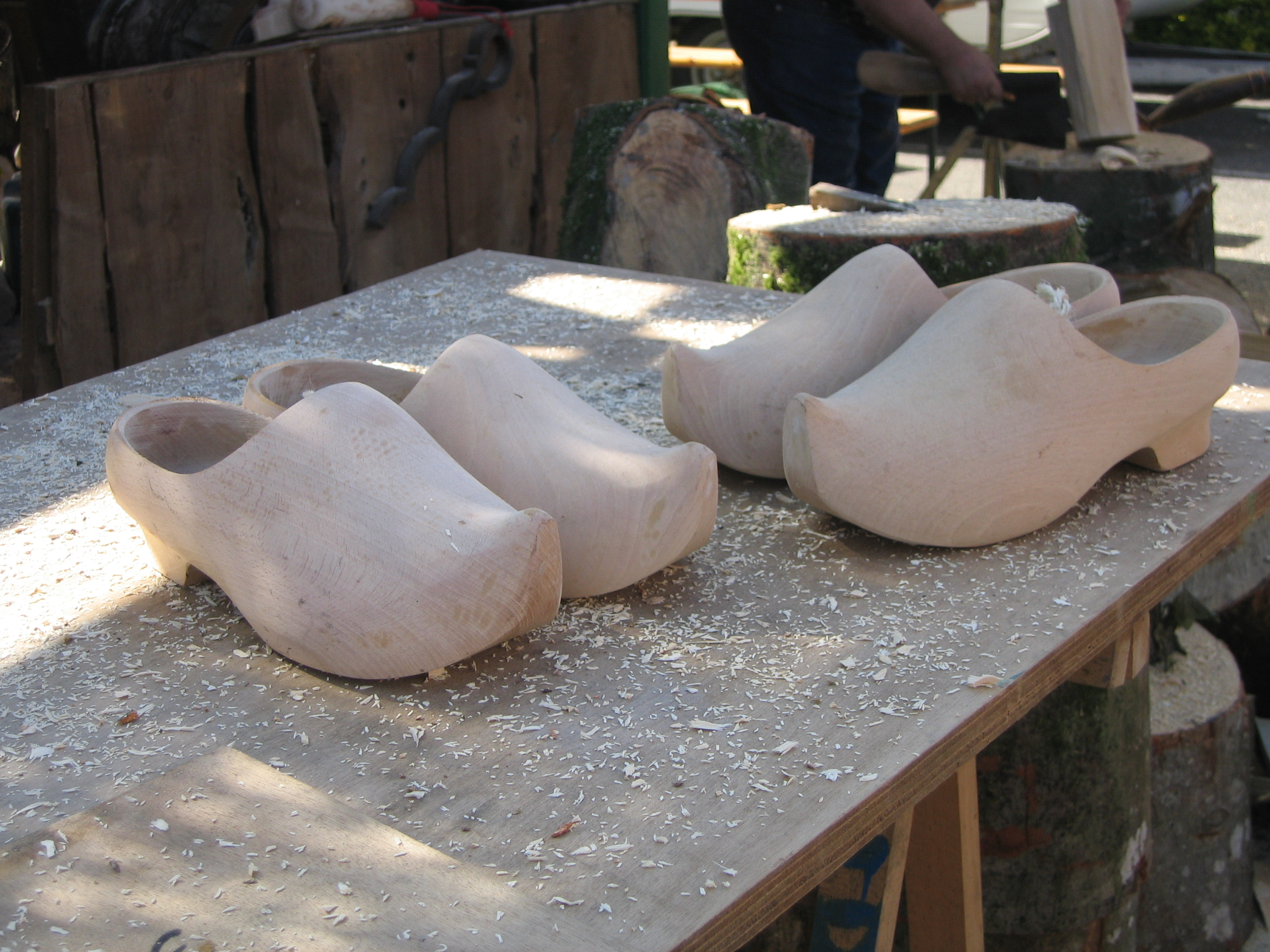
Sabots from Brittany

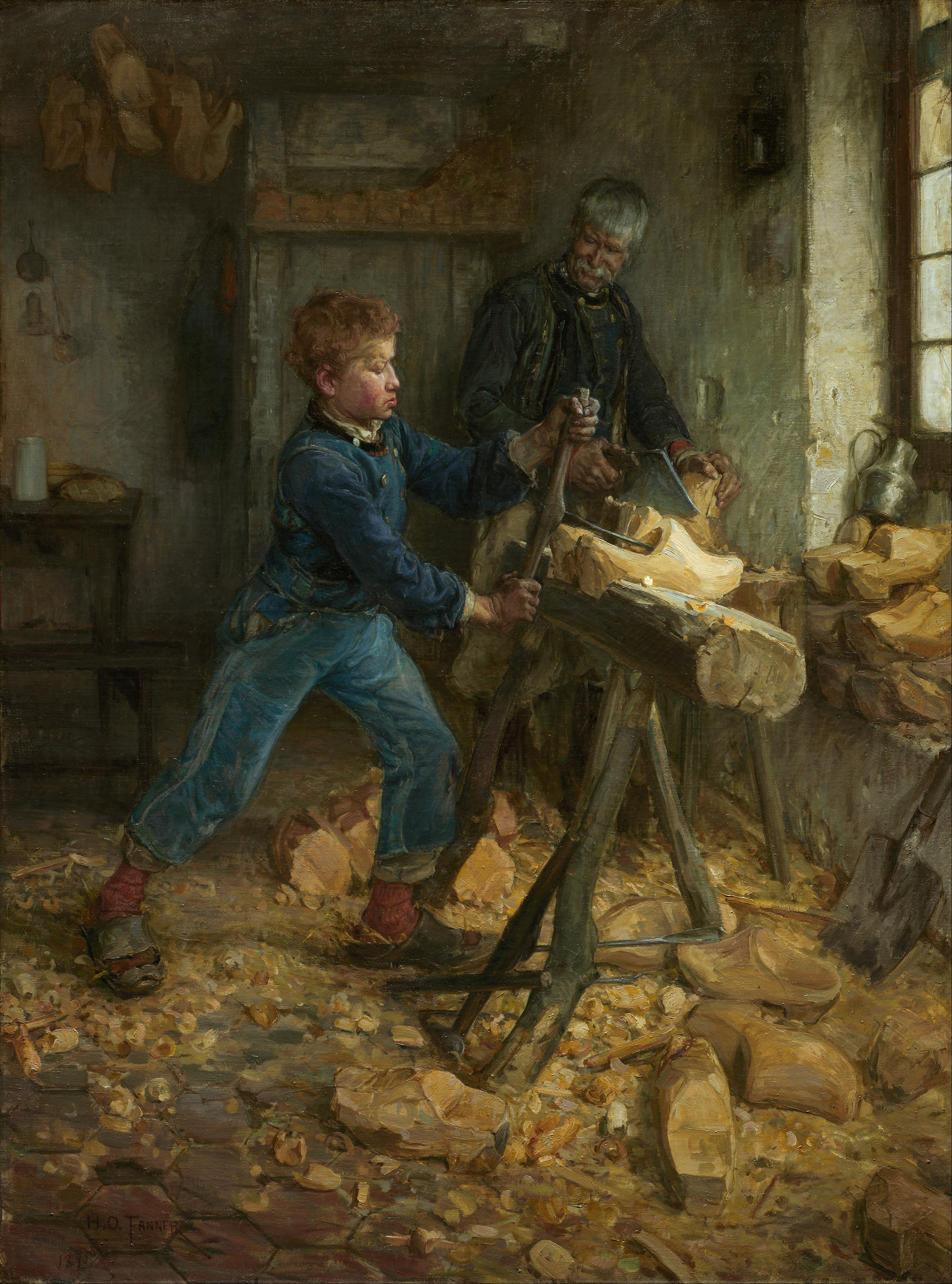
Henry Ossawa Tanner - The Young Sabot Maker

A sabot (/ˈsæboʊ/, US also /sæˈboʊ, sə-/) is a clog from France or surrounding countries such as The Netherlands, Belgium or Italy. Sabots are either whole-foot clogs or a heavy leather shoe with a wooden sole.

Sabots were considered a work shoe associated with the lower classes in the 16th to 19th centuries. During this period, the years of the Industrial Revolution, the word sabotage gained currency. An alleged etymology describes the actions of disgruntled workers who willfully damaged workplace machinery by throwing their sabots into the works. However it is more likely that sabotage is derived from the noise and clumsiness associated with the wooden sabot shoe.

The American artist Henry Ossawa Tanner settled in France and one of his paintings depicts sabot manufacture. The picture, The Young Sabot Maker, is now on display in the Nelson-Atkins Museum of Art, Kansas City, Missouri.

During World War II, 45,000 pairs of sabot were made in Jersey during the occupation of the island from 1940–45.

== See also ==
- List of shoe styles
- Geta (footwear)
- Luddite
