= Camille O. and William H. Cosby Collection of African American Art =

Art collection

The Camille O. and William H. Cosby Collection of African American Art is a private collection of over sixty pieces of African-American art owned by entertainer Bill Cosby and his wife Camille.

The first substantial loan of the collection was to the Smithsonian Institution's National Museum of African Art for its 50th anniversary. The exhibition Conversations: African and African American Artworks in Dialogue, took place from 2014 to 2016.

== List of artists collected ==
- Romare Bearden
- Elizabeth Catlett
- Beauford Delaney
- Loïs Mailou Jones
- Jacob Lawrence
- Keith Morrison
- Faith Ringgold
- Augusta Savage
- Henry Ossawa Tanner - The Thankful Poor
- Alma Thomas
