= Hampton University Museum =

Museum in Hampton, Virginia

- Established: 1868
- Location: Hampton University, Virginia
- Coordinates: 37°01′22″N 76°20′07″W
- Directors: Vanessa Thaxton-Ward, Ph.D
- Website: https://home.hamptonu.edu/msm/

Founded in 1868 on the campus of Hampton University, the Hampton University Museum is the oldest African-American museum in the United States and the oldest museum in Virginia. It is the first institutional collection of work by African-American artists, and also has the South's largest collection of ethnic art, including African and American Indian art and artifacts. With galleries dedicated to African American, African, American Indian, Asian and Pacific art and artifacts, the museum contains more than 9,000 objects representing cultures and people from around the world.

== History ==
Hampton University founder Gen. Samuel C. Armstrong founded the university’s museum as the "Curiosity Room" the same year he founded the university.
