= Judge Frost =

Judge Frost may refer to:

- E. Scott Frost (born 1962), judge of the United States District Court for the Northern District of Texas
- Edward Frost (1801–1868), judge of the South Carolina Court of Common Pleas
- Gregory L. Frost (born 1949), judge of the United States District Court for the Southern District of Ohio
- Hildreth Frost (1880–1955), United States Army Judge Advocate
- Joel Frost (1765–1827), New York state court judge
