= Judge Simons =

Judge Simons may refer to:

- Charles Earl Simons Jr. (1916–1999), judge of the United States District Court for the District of South Carolina
- Charles C. Simons (1876–1964), judge of the United States Court of Appeals for the Sixth Circuit
