= Judge Cochran =

Judge Cochran may refer to:

- Andrew McConnell January Cochran (1854–1934), judge of the United States District Court for the Eastern District of Kentucky
- Ernest Ford Cochran (1865–1934), judge of the United States District Court for the Eastern District of South Carolina
