= Robert W. Hemphill =

American judge (1915–1983)

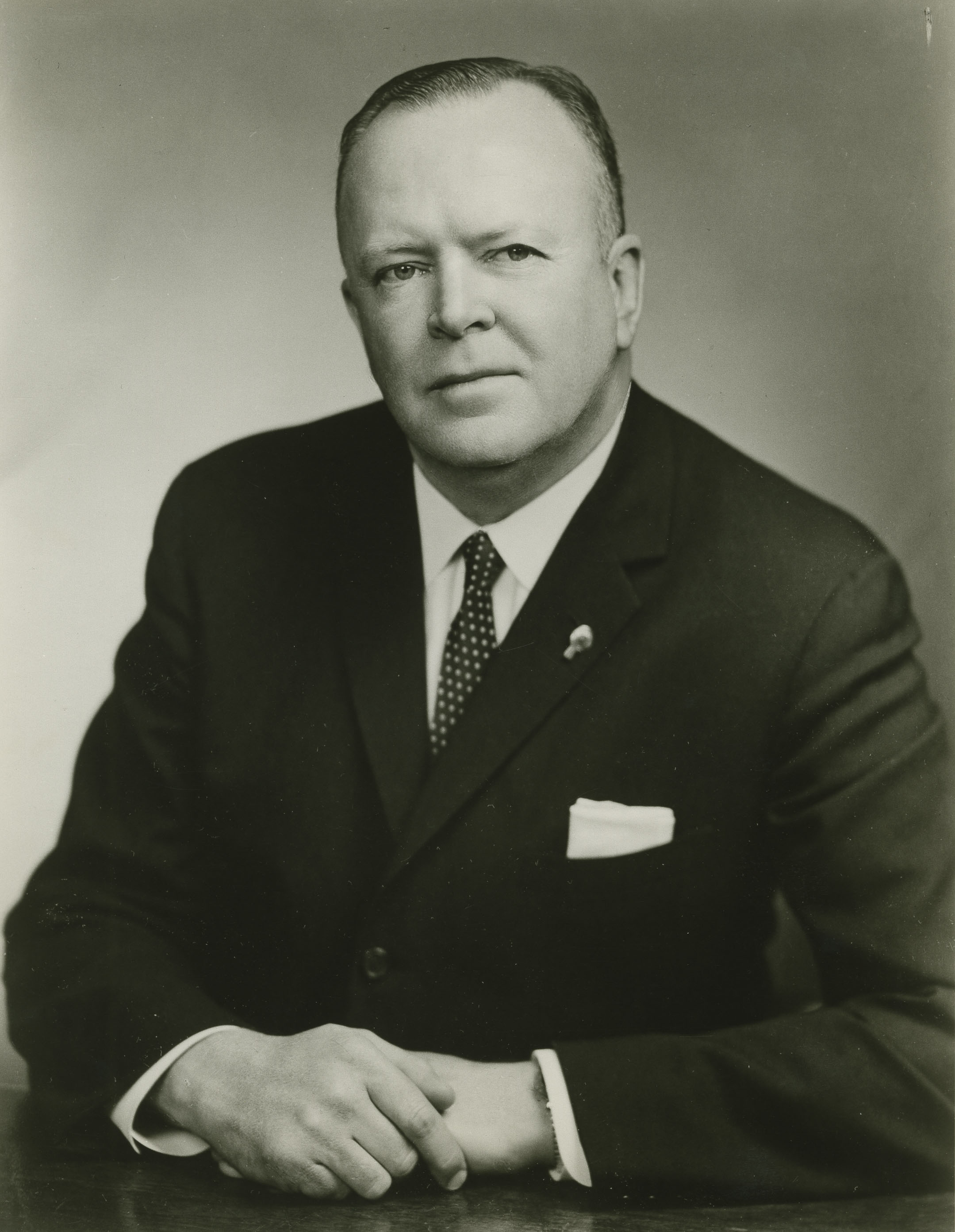

Senior Judge of the United States District Court for the District of South Carolina
- In office May 10, 1980 – December 25, 1983

Chief Judge of the United States District Court for the District of South Carolina
- In office 1979–1980
- Preceded by: James Robert Martin Jr.
- Succeeded by: Charles Earl Simons Jr.

Judge of the United States District Court for the District of South Carolina
- In office November 1, 1965 – May 10, 1980
- Appointed by: operation of law
- Preceded by: Seat established by 79 Stat. 951
- Succeeded by: William Walter Wilkins

Chief Judge of the United States District Court for the Eastern District of South Carolina
- In office 1964–1965
- Preceded by: George Bell Timmerman Sr.
- Succeeded by: Office abolished

Judge of the United States District Court for the Eastern District of South Carolina and United States District Court for the Western District of South Carolina
- In office April 30, 1964 – November 1, 1965
- Appointed by: Lyndon B. Johnson
- Preceded by: George Bell Timmerman Sr.
- Succeeded by: Seat abolished

Member of the U.S. House of Representatives from South Carolina's 5th district
- In office January 3, 1957 – May 1, 1964
- Preceded by: James P. Richards
- Succeeded by: Thomas S. Gettys

Personal details
- Born: Robert Witherspoon Hemphill; May 10, 1915 Chester, South Carolina, US
- Died: December 25, 1983 (aged 68) Chester, South Carolina, US
- Resting place: Blackstock, South Carolina
- Party: Democratic
- Spouse: Forrest Isabelle (m. 1942; died 1982)
- Children: 3
- Education: University of South Carolina (AB, LLB)

Robert Witherspoon Hemphill (May 10, 1915 – December 25, 1983) was a United States representative from South Carolina and later was a United States district judge of the United States District Court for the District of South Carolina.

== Education and career ==
Born on May 10, 1915, in Chester, South Carolina, Hemphill attended the public schools. He graduated with an Artium Baccalaureus degree from the University of South Carolina in 1936 and with a Bachelor of Laws from the University of South Carolina School of Law in 1938. At the university, Hemphill was a member of the Euphradian Society. He was admitted to the bar in 1938 and commenced the practice of law in Chester until 1964. Hemphill volunteered in 1941 as a flying cadet in the United States Army Air Corps and served as a bomber pilot until December 1945. After returning from the war, he served as chairman of Chester County Democratic conventions in 1946 and 1947. He was elected to the South Carolina House of Representatives in 1946, serving from 1947 to 1948. He served as solicitor of the Sixth South Carolina Judicial Circuit from 1950 to 1956.

== Congressional service ==
Hemphill was elected as a Democrat to the Eighty-fifth and to the three succeeding Congresses, serving from January 3, 1957, until his resignation May 1, 1964, to take a federal judicial post. During his Congressional service, he was a delegate to the North Atlantic Treaty Organization Congress in London in 1959. According to one observer, Hemphill was one of the most liberal members of South Carolina’s delegation.

== Federal judicial service ==
Hemphill was nominated by President Lyndon B. Johnson on April 15, 1964, to a joint seat on the United States District Court for the Eastern District of South Carolina and the United States District Court for the Western District of South Carolina vacated by Judge George Bell Timmerman Sr. He was confirmed by the United States Senate on April 30, 1964, and received his commission on April 30, 1964. He served as Chief Judge of the Eastern District from 1964 to 1965. On November 1, 1965, the Eastern and Western Districts were recombined into a single United States District Court for the District of South Carolina. On that day, Hemphill was reassigned by operation of law to a new seat authorized by 79 Stat. 951. He served as Chief Judge from 1979 to 1980. He assumed senior status on May 10, 1980. His service terminated on December 25, 1983, due to his death in Chester. He was interred in Hopewell Associate Reformed Presbyterian Church Cemetery, in Chester.

== Personal ==
Hemphill was married to his wife, Forrest Isabelle, in 1942. Together, they had 3 children: Forrest, Harriet, and Robert Jr. Hemphill was the great-great-nephew of Senator John Hemphill, great-nephew of John J. Hemphill, great-nephew of William Huggins Brawley, and great-great-grandson of Robert Witherspoon.

== Sources ==
- United States Congress. "Robert W. Hemphill (id: H000471)". Biographical Directory of the United States Congress.
- Robert Witherspoon Hemphill Papers at South Carolina Political Collections at the University of South Carolina

U.S. House of Representatives
Preceded by James P. Richards	Member of the U.S. House of Representatives from South Carolina's 5th congressional district 1957–1964	Succeeded by Thomas S. Gettys
Legal offices
Preceded by George Bell Timmerman Sr.	Judge of the United States District Court for the Eastern District of South Carolina; Judge of the United States District Court for the Western District of South Carolina; 1964–1965	Succeeded by Seat abolished
Preceded by George Bell Timmerman Sr.	Chief Judge of the United States District Court for the Eastern District of South Carolina; 1964–1965	Succeeded by Office abolished
Preceded by Seat established by 79 Stat. 951	Judge of the United States District Court for the District of South Carolina; 1965–1980	Succeeded by William Walter Wilkins
Preceded by James Robert Martin Jr.	Chief Judge of the United States District Court for the District of South Carolina; 1979–1980	Succeeded by Charles Earl Simons Jr.
