= Charles Cecil Wyche =

American judge

Charles Wyche
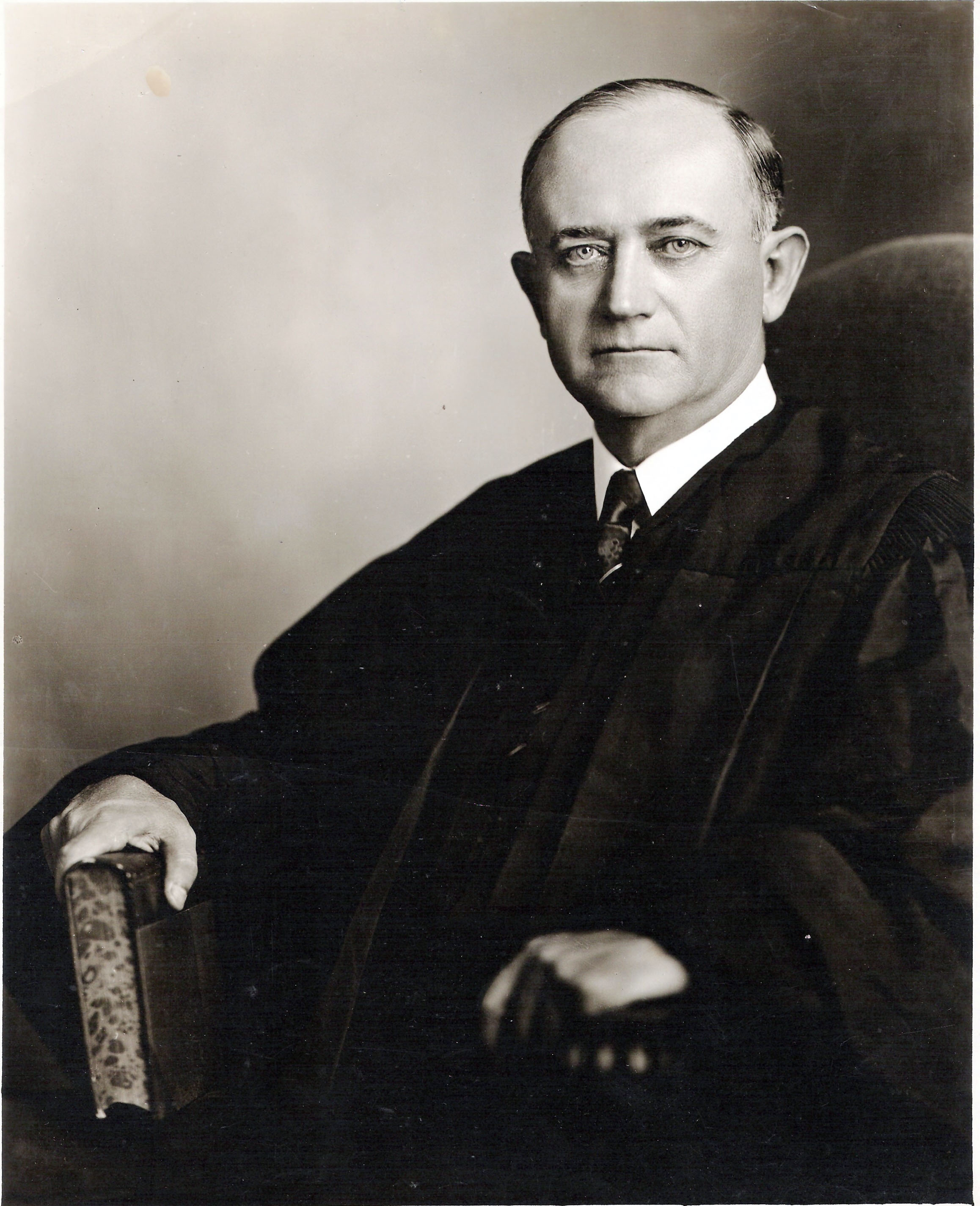

Judge of the United States District Court for the District of South Carolina
- In office November 1, 1965 – September 17, 1966
- Appointed by: operation of law
- Preceded by: Seat established by 79 Stat. 951
- Succeeded by: Donald S. Russell

Chief Judge of the United States District Court for the Western District of South Carolina
- In office 1948–1962
- Preceded by: Office established
- Succeeded by: James Robert Martin Jr.

Judge of the United States District Court for the Western District of South Carolina
- In office January 30, 1937 – November 1, 1965
- Appointed by: Franklin D. Roosevelt
- Preceded by: Henry Hitt Watkins
- Succeeded by: Seat abolished

Personal details
- Born: Charles Cecil Wyche; July 7, 1885 Prosperity, South Carolina, U.S.
- Died: September 17, 1966 (aged 81) Spartanburg, South Carolina, U.S.
- Education: The Citadel (B.S.); Georgetown Law read law

Charles Cecil Wyche (July 7, 1885 – September 17, 1966) was a United States district judge of the United States District Court for the Western District of South Carolina and the United States District Court for the District of South Carolina.

== Education and career ==
Born in Prosperity, South Carolina, Wyche received a Bachelor of Science degree from The Citadel in 1906 and attended Georgetown Law, but read law to enter the Bar in 1909. He was in private practice in Spartanburg, South Carolina from 1909 to 1937. He served in the South Carolina House of Representatives from 1913 to 1914. He was a Major in the United States Army during World War I from 1917 to 1919. He was a city attorney for Spartanburg from 1919 to 1922, and a county attorney for Spartanburg County from 1919 to 1933. He was a special judge of the Circuit Court of Cherokee County, South Carolina in 1924. He was a special associate justice of the Supreme Court of South Carolina in 1929. From 1933 to 1937 he was the United States Attorney for the Western District of South Carolina.

== Federal judicial service ==
Wyche was nominated by President Franklin D. Roosevelt on January 11, 1937, to a seat on the United States District Court for the Western District of South Carolina vacated by Judge Henry H. Watkins. He was confirmed by the United States Senate on January 22, 1937, and received his commission on January 30, 1937. He served as Chief Judge from 1948 to 1962. Wyche was reassigned by operation of law to the United States District Court for the District of South Carolina on November 1, 1965, to a new seat authorized by 79 Stat. 951. His service terminated on September 17, 1966, due to his death.

== Sources ==
- Charles Cecil Wyche Papers, 1902-1963 at the David M. Rubenstein Rare Book & Manuscript Library at Duke University
- Charles Cecil Wyche Papers at South Carolina Political Collections at the University of South Carolina

Legal offices
Preceded by Henry Hitt Watkins	Judge of the United States District Court for the Western District of South Carolina; 1937–1965	Succeeded by Seat abolished
Preceded by Office established	Chief Judge of the United States District Court for the Western District of South Carolina; 1948–1962	Succeeded by James Robert Martin Jr.
Preceded by Seat established by 79 Stat. 951	Judge of the United States District Court for the District of South Carolina; 1965–1966	Succeeded by Donald S. Russell
