= Magnolia Cemetery (Charleston, South Carolina) =

Historic cemetery

- U.S. National Register of Historic Places
- U.S. Historic district
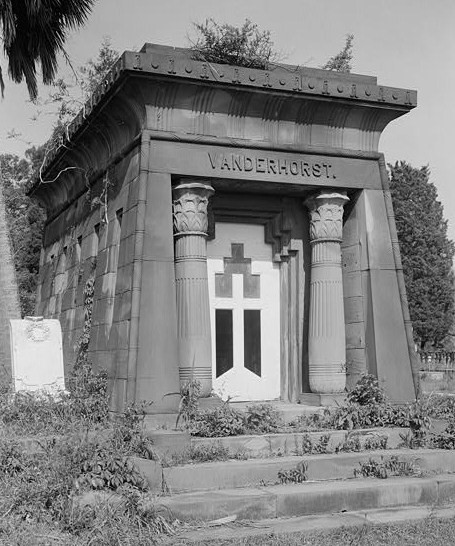
- Vanderhorst Mausoleum

- Location within South Carolina Location within the United States
- Nearest city: Charleston, South Carolina
- Coordinates: 32°49′6″N 79°56′32″W
- Area: 92 acres (37 ha)
- Built: 1850
- Architect: Edward C. Jones
- NRHP reference No.: 78002502
- Added to NRHP: March 24, 1978

Magnolia Cemetery is a historic rural cemetery in Charleston, South Carolina. The first board for the cemetery was assembled in 1849. Edward C. Jones served as the architect. It was dedicated in 1850; Charles Fraser delivered the dedication address. It was listed on the National Register of Historic Places as a Historic District in 1978.

The location of the cemetery had previously been a plantation known as Magnolia Umbra, the house of which was described as a newly built house with five rooms in 1820. The cemetery was constructed during 1850, on plans laid out by Edward C. Jones, and included a Gothic chapel also designed by Jones which no longer exists. The chapel, which was located near the central lake, remained under construction until early 1851. Both the chapel and the porter's lodge sustained very heavy damage during the cemetery's occupation by federal forces during the Civil War. The porter's lodge at the entrance was demolished in 1868, but the chapel continued to be used until at least 1876.

According to a 1909 newspaper account, "There is a rule in Charleston that colored people shall not be allowed to parade through Magnolia cemetery, the principal burying place of the white citizens," and this exclusion policy was enforced regardless of social status, such as in the case of Dr. Crum being prohibited from driving through the cemetery.

== Notable interments ==
- William Aiken, Jr. (1806–1887), US Congressman, South Carolina Governor
- John Bennett (1865–1956), author and illustrator
- Thomas Bennett, Jr. (1781–1865), Governor of South Carolina
- William H. Brawley (1841–1916), U.S. Representative from South Carolina and United States federal judge
- Sallie F. Chapin (1830–1896), organized the Charleston Woman's Christian Temperance Union in 1881, the first in the state and served as first State president in 1883
- Langdon Cheves (1776–1857), American politician and a president of the Second Bank of the United States
- James Conner (1829–1883), Confederate general in the American Civil War
- George E. Dixon (1837–1864), Commander of the Confederate submarine H.L. Hunley
- Edward Frost (1801–1868), state politician and judge
- Frank Bunker Gilbreth, Jr. (1911–2001), author
- William J. Grayson (1788–1863), U.S. Representative from South Carolina
- Wilson Godfrey Harvey (1866–1932), Governor of South Carolina
- J. C. Hemphill (died 1927), journalist and editor
- John Edwards Holbrook (1796-1871), Ichthyologist, Herpetologist, and Physician
- Daniel Elliott Huger (1779–1854), US Senator from South Carolina
- Horace Lawson Hunley (1823–1863), Confederate marine engineer, developer of early submarines
- Micah Jenkins (1835–1864), Confederate general
- Mitchell Campbell King (1815–1901), physician
- George Swinton Legaré (1869–1913), U.S. Representative from South Carolina
- Hugh S. Legaré (1797–1843), 16th U.S. Attorney General
- William Turner Logan (1874–1941), U.S. Representative from South Carolina
- Andrew Gordon Magrath (1813–1893), South Carolina Governor
- Burnet Rhett Maybank (1899–1954), US Senator, South Carolina Governor
- John Darlington Newcomer (1867–1931), American architect
- Ziba B. Oakes (1807–1871), slave trader
- Josephine Pinckney (1895–1957), novelist and poet
- St. Julien Ravenel (1819–1882), physician and chemist
- Robert Rhett (1869–1913), U.S. Representative and Senator from South Carolina
- Roswell S. Ripley (1823–1887), Confederate general
- William Gilmore Simms (1806–1870), poet, novelist and historian
- James Simons Jr. (1839–1919), South Carolina politician and newspaper executive
- Charles Henry Simonton (1829–1904), Confederate Colonel and federal judge on 4th Circuit Court of Appeals
- Julius Waties Waring (1880–1968), United States federal judge linked to the American Civil Rights Movement.
- Richard Smith Whaley (1874–1951), U.S. Representative from South Carolina
- British war graves of five Royal Navy and Merchant Navy personnel of World War II.

== Gallery ==
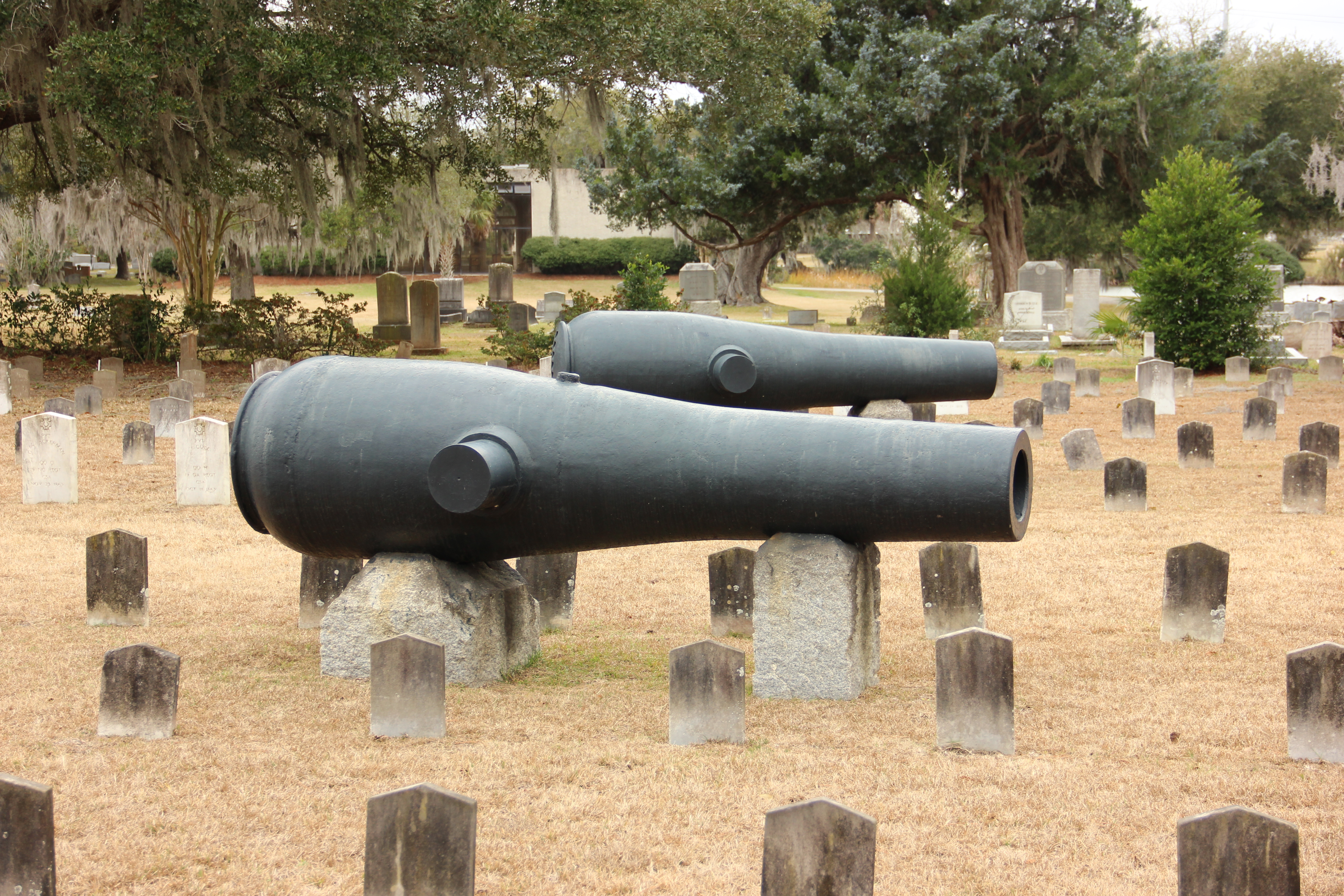
Cannons in Confederate section

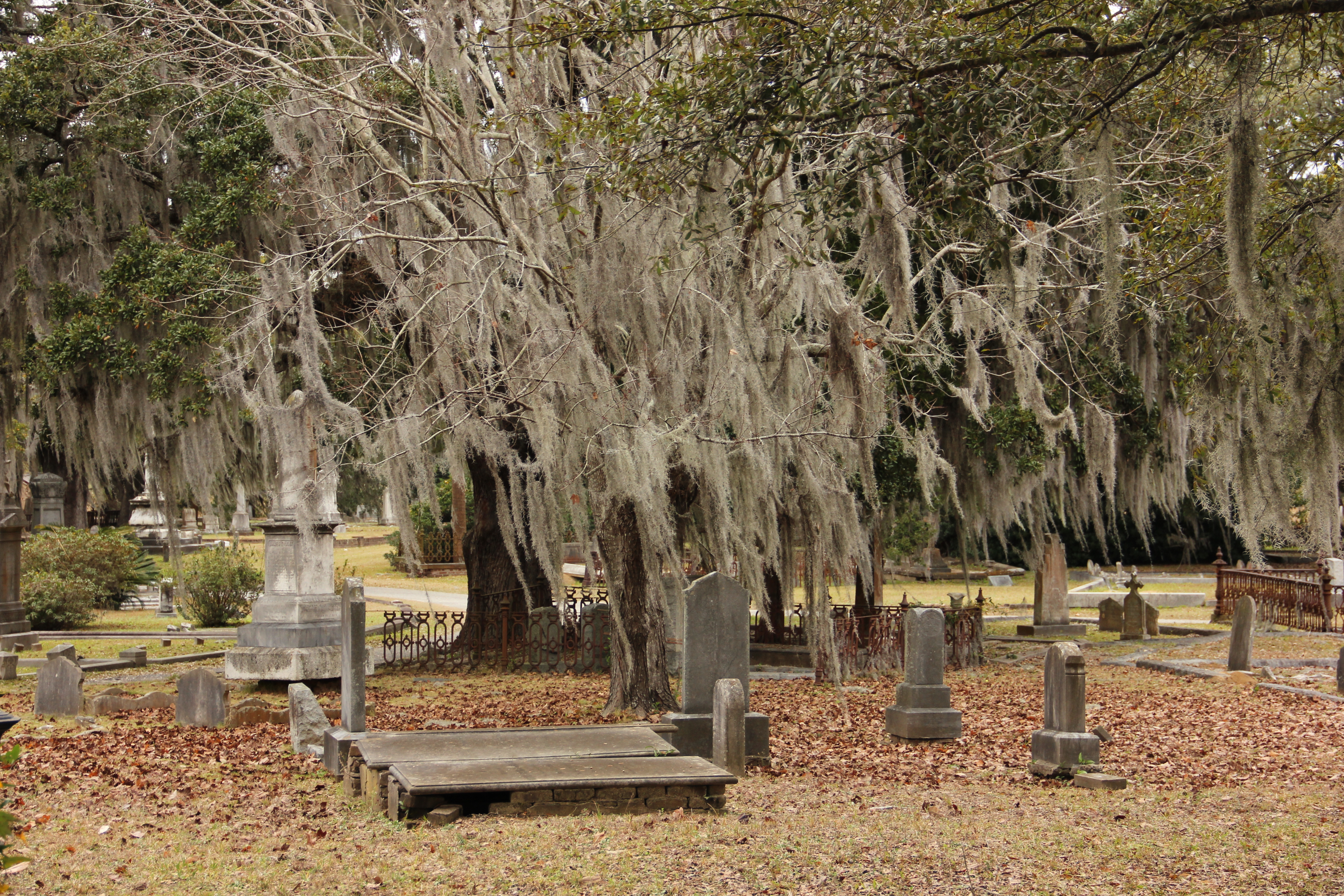
Graves surrounded by southern live oak and Spanish moss

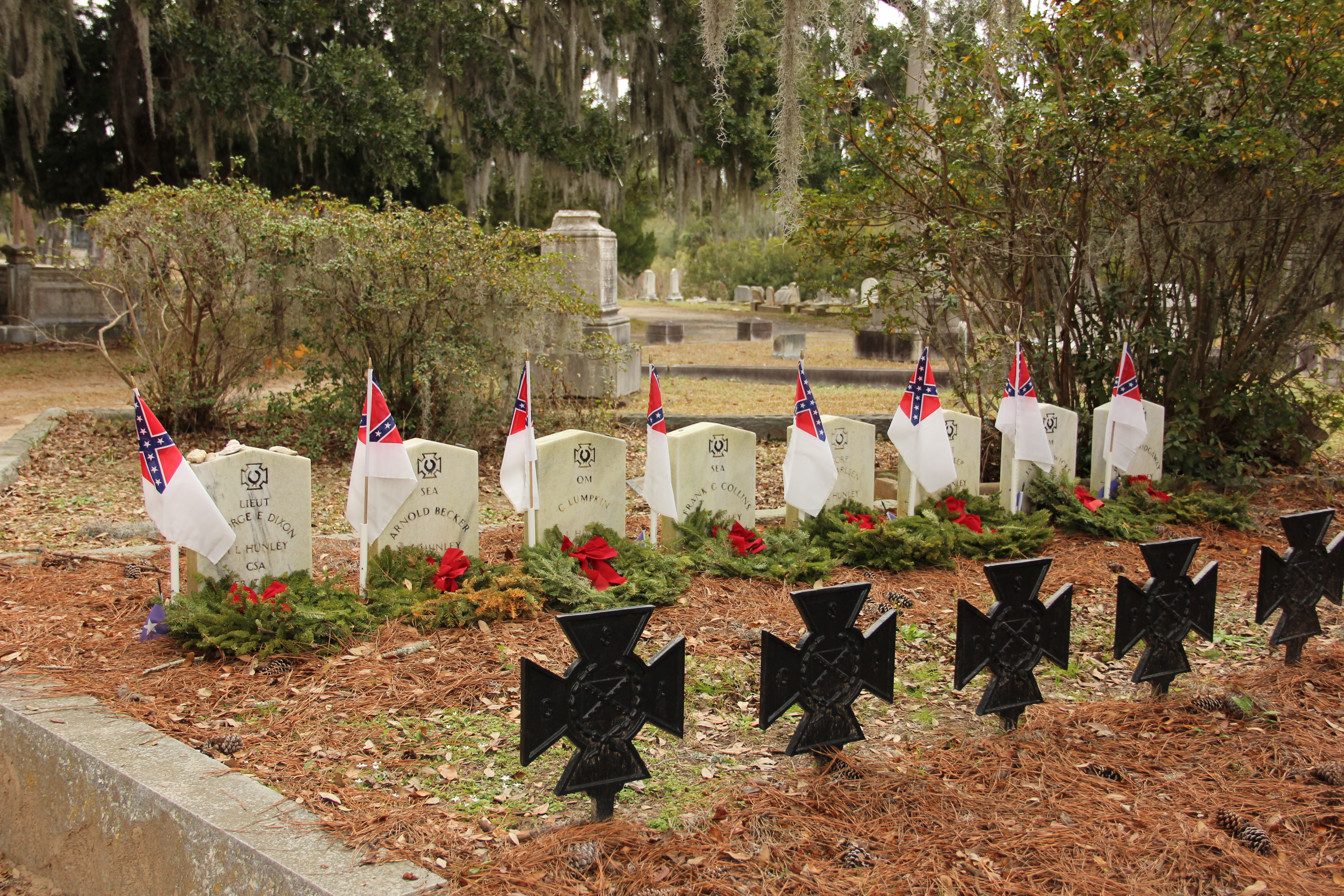
Gravestones of third and final crew of the H.L. Hunley

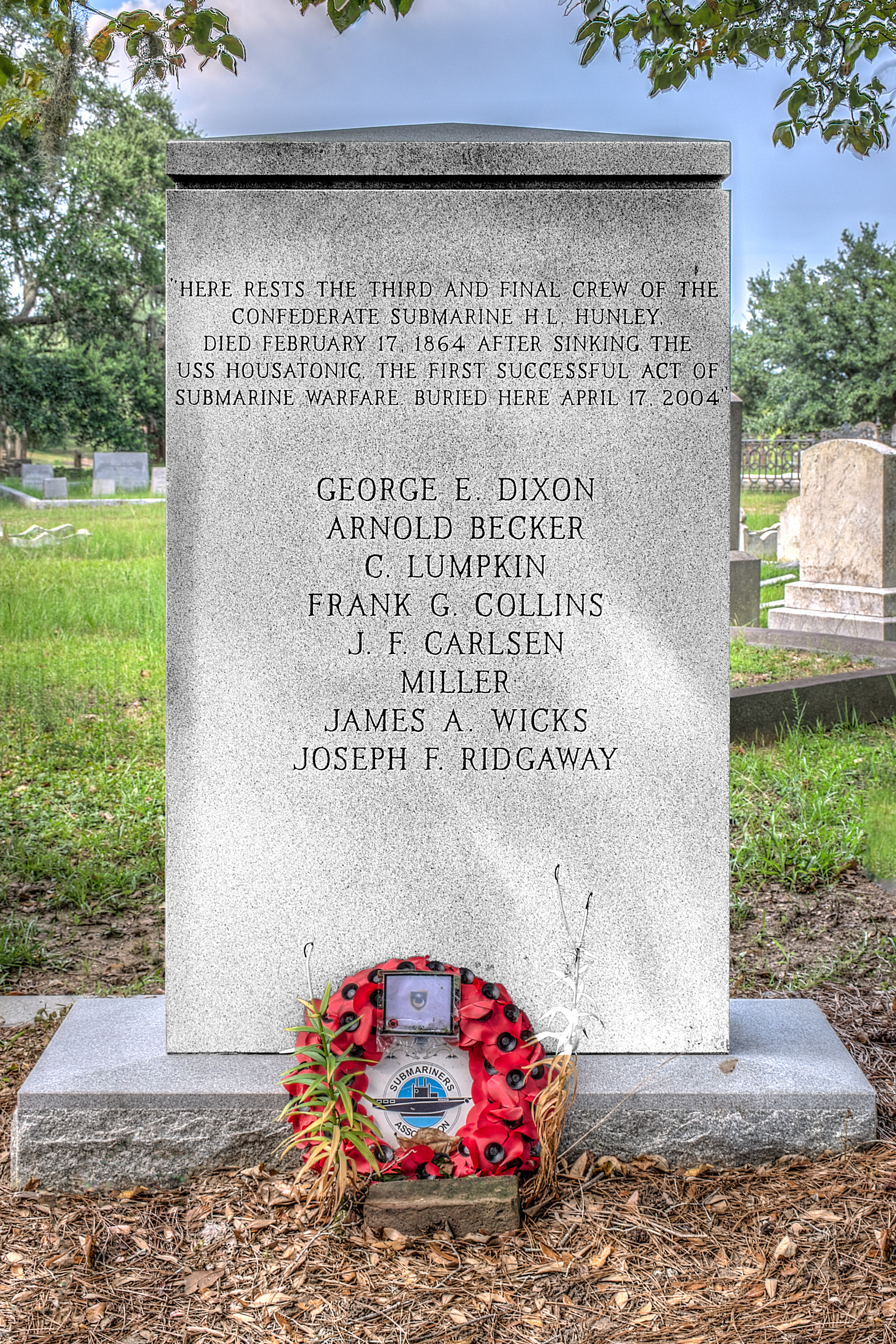
H.L. Hunley Memorial Marker

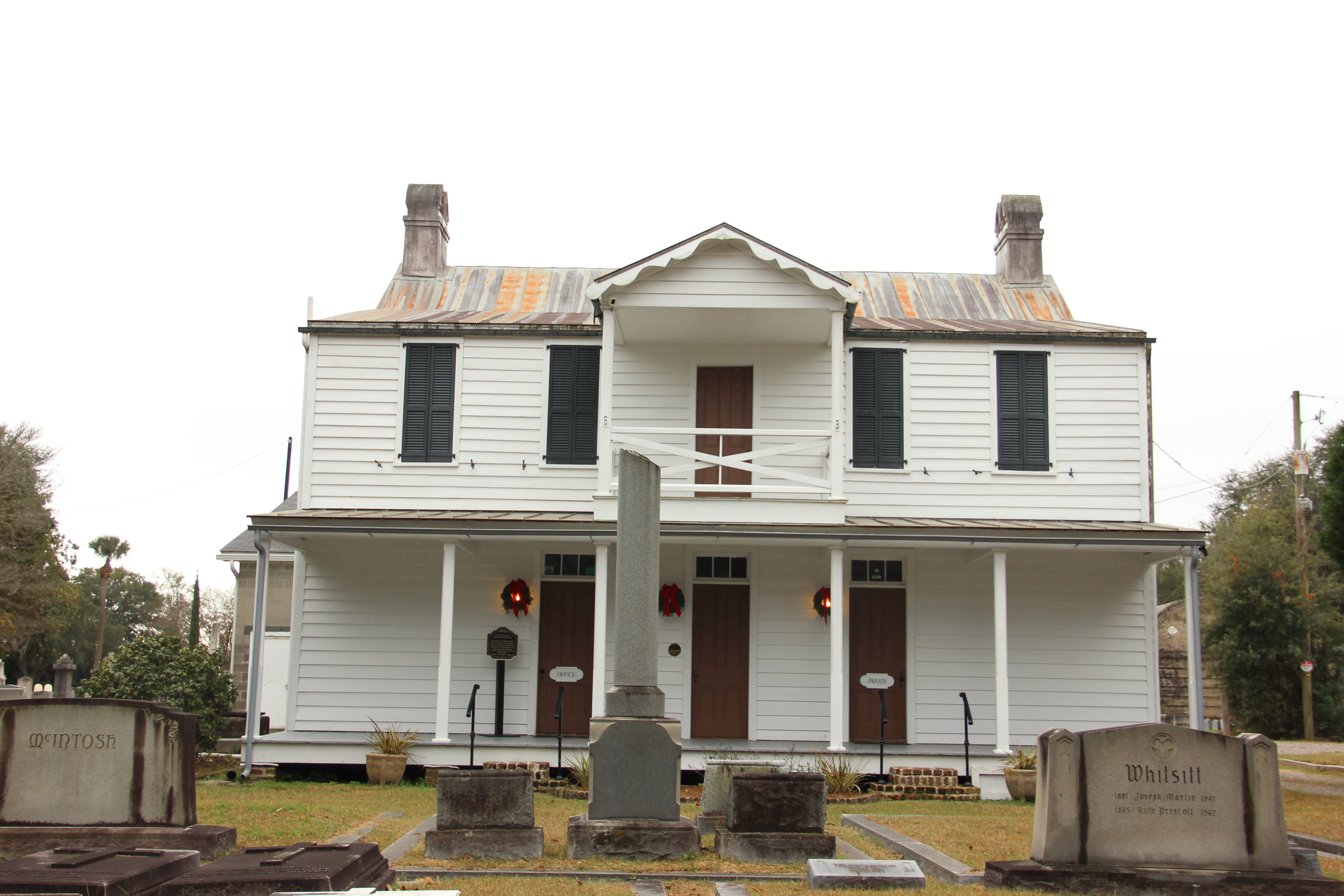
Main office and research aid

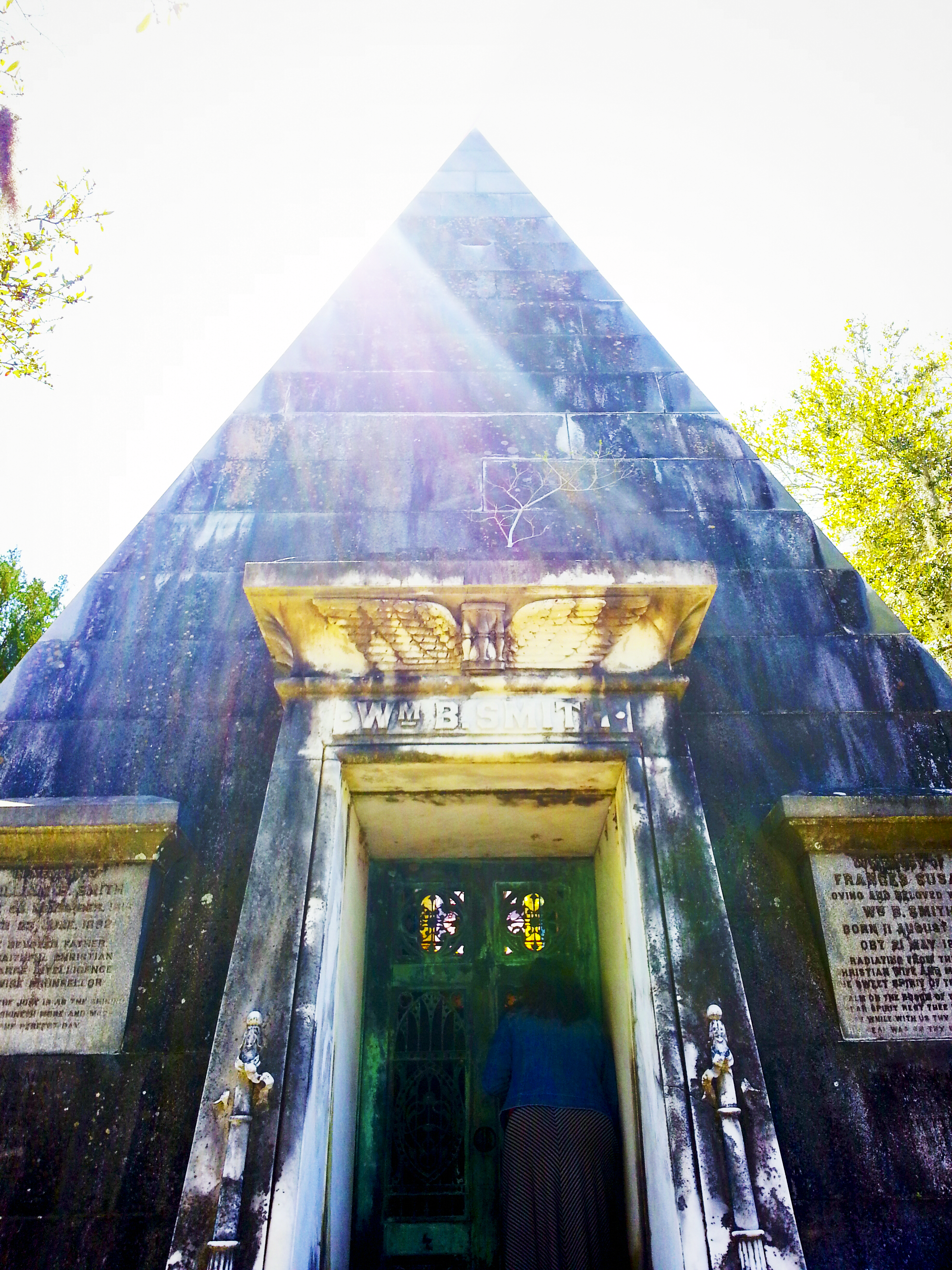
Wm B Smith Monument, one of the most unusual and striking crypts at Magnolia Cemetery in Charleston, South Carolina

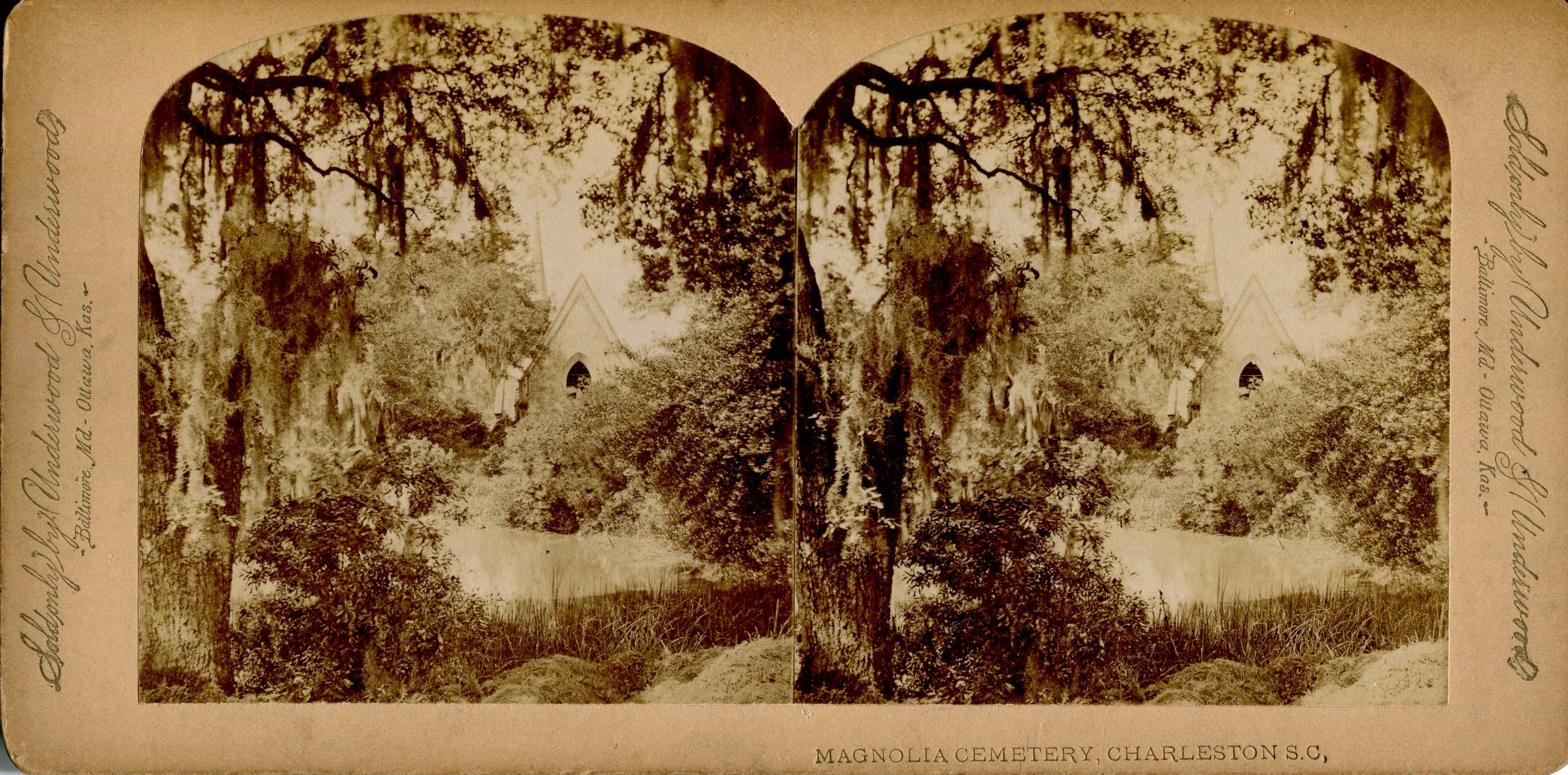
The chapel at Magnolia Cemetery

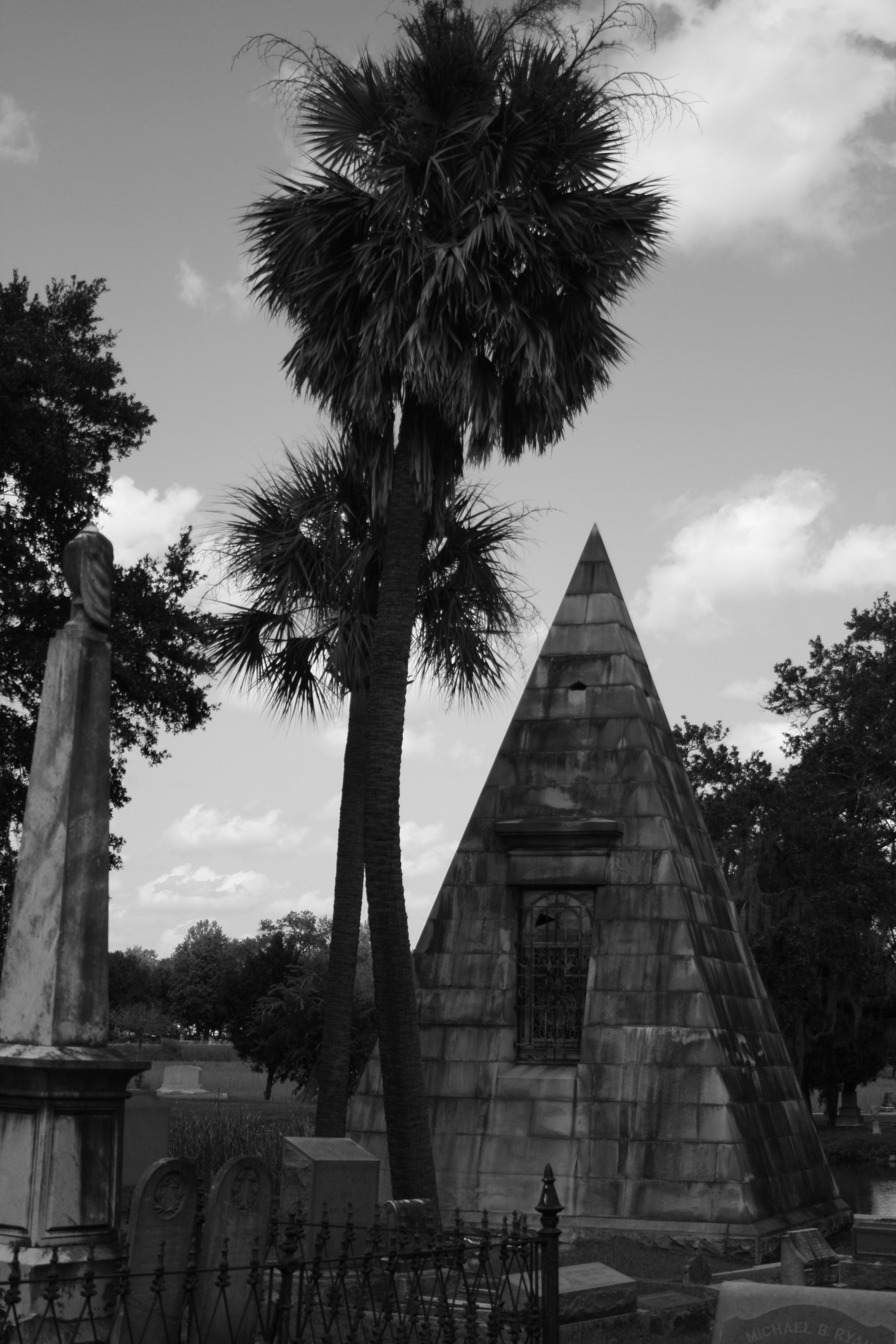
Magnolia Cemetery in Charleston, South Carolina

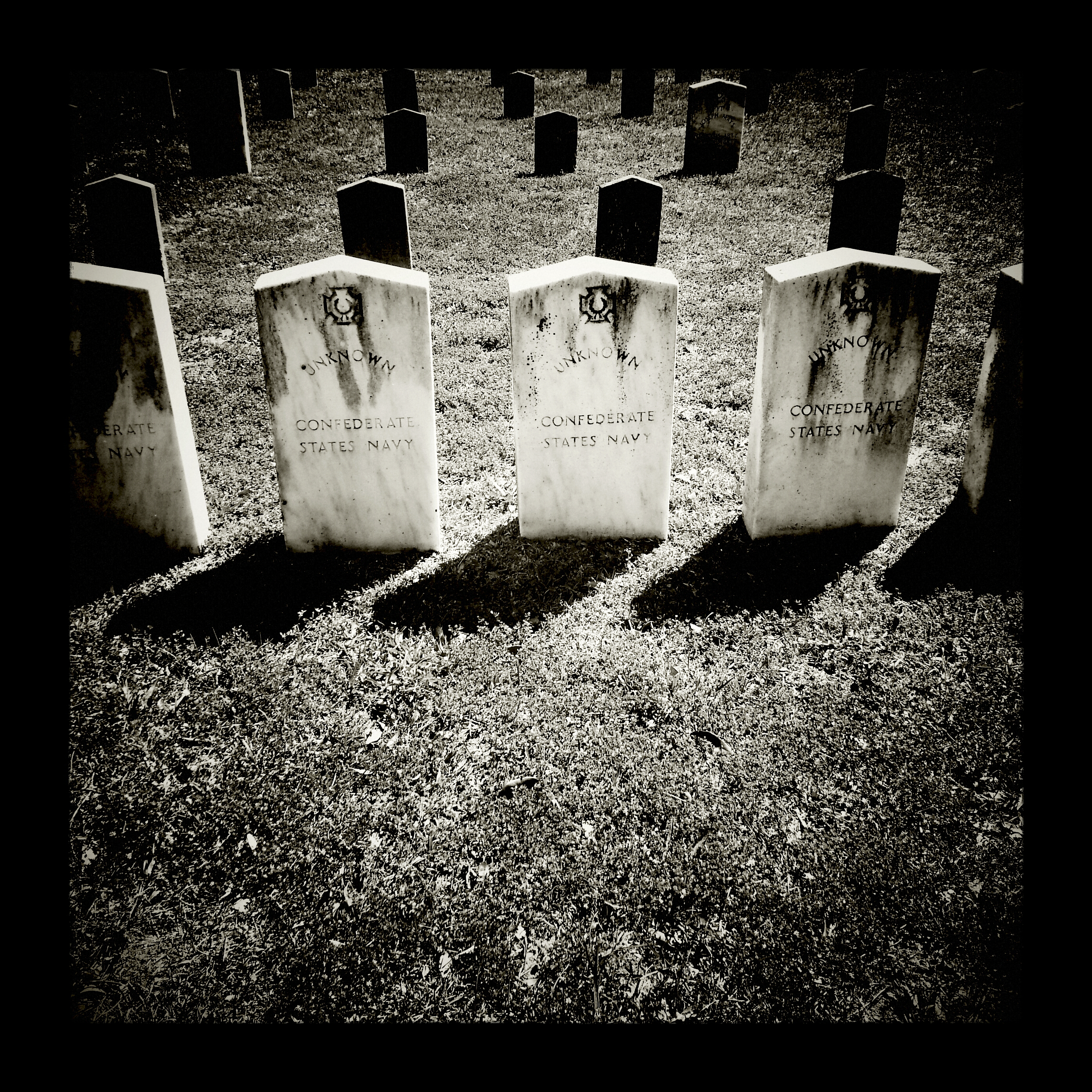
Unknown Confederate States Navy Markers
