= James Robert Martin Jr. =

American judge

Senior Judge of the United States District Court for the District of South Carolina
- In office November 30, 1979 – November 14, 1984

Chief Judge of the United States District Court for the District of South Carolina
- In office 1965–1979
- Preceded by: Office established
- Succeeded by: Robert W. Hemphill

Judge of the United States District Court for the District of South Carolina
- In office November 1, 1965 – November 30, 1979
- Appointed by: operation of law
- Preceded by: Seat established by 79 Stat. 591
- Succeeded by: G. Ross Anderson

Chief Judge of the United States District Court for the Western District of South Carolina
- In office 1962–1965
- Preceded by: Charles Cecil Wyche
- Succeeded by: Office abolished

Judge of the United States District Court for the Eastern District of South Carolina and United States District Court for the Western District of South Carolina
- In office September 18, 1961 – November 1, 1965
- Appointed by: John F. Kennedy
- Preceded by: Seat established by 75 Stat. 80
- Succeeded by: Seat abolished

Personal details
- Born: James Robert Martin Jr. November 30, 1909 Greenville, South Carolina, U.S.
- Died: November 14, 1984 (aged 74)
- Education: Washington and Lee University; School of Law (LL.B.)

James Robert Martin Jr. (November 30, 1909 – November 14, 1984) was a United States district judge of the United States District Court for the Eastern District of South Carolina, the United States District Court for the Western District of South Carolina and later the United States District Court for the District of South Carolina.

== Education and career ==
Born in Greenville, South Carolina, Martin received a Bachelor of Laws from Washington and Lee University School of Law in 1931. From 1931 to 1944 he was in private practice in Greenville. He was a member of the South Carolina House of Representatives from Greenville County from 1943 to 1944. He was a judge of the Thirteenth Judicial Circuit of South Carolina from 1944 to 1961.

== Federal judicial service ==
Martin was nominated by President John F. Kennedy on August 30, 1961, to the United States District Court for the Eastern District of South Carolina and to the United States District Court for the Western District of South Carolina, to a new joint seat created by 75 Stat. 80. He was confirmed by the United States Senate on September 8, 1961, and received his commission on September 18, 1961. He served as Chief Judge of the Western District from 1962 to 1965. He was reassigned by operation of law to the United States District Court for the District of South Carolina on November 1, 1965, to a new seat authorized by 79 Stat. 951. He served as Chief Judge from 1965 to 1979. He assumed senior status on November 30, 1979. Martin served in that capacity until his death on November 14, 1984.

== Sources ==
Legal offices
Preceded by Seat established by 75 Stat. 80	Judge of the United States District Court for the Eastern District of South Carolina; Judge of the United States District Court for the Western District of South Carolina; 1961–1965	Succeeded by Seat abolished
Preceded by Charles Cecil Wyche	Chief Judge of the United States District Court for the Western District of South Carolina; 1962–1965	Succeeded by Office abolished
Preceded by Seat established by 79 Stat. 591	Judge of the United States District Court for the District of South Carolina; 1965–1979	Succeeded by G. Ross Anderson
Preceded by Office established	Chief Judge of the United States District Court for the District of South Carolina; 1965–1979	Succeeded by Robert W. Hemphill
