= William H. Brawley =

American politician and judge (1841–1916)

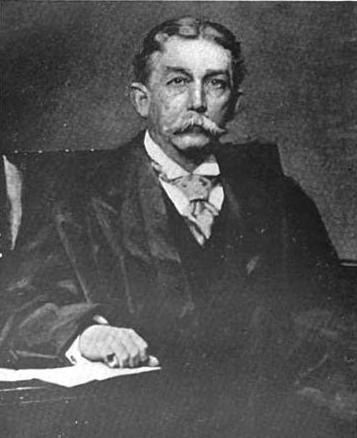

Judge of the United States District Court for the District of South Carolina
- In office January 18, 1894 – June 14, 1911
- Appointed by: Grover Cleveland
- Preceded by: Charles Henry Simonton
- Succeeded by: Henry Augustus Middleton Smith

Member of the U.S. House of Representatives from South Carolina's 1st district
- In office March 4, 1891 – February 12, 1894
- Preceded by: Samuel Dibble
- Succeeded by: James F. Izlar

Member of the South Carolina House of Representatives
- In office 1882-1890

Personal details
- Born: William Hiram Brawley; May 13, 1841 Chester, South Carolina, US
- Died: November 15, 1916 (aged 75) Charleston, South Carolina, US
- Resting place: Magnolia Cemetery
- Party: Democratic
- Relatives: John J. Hemphill; Robert W. Hemphill
- Education: University of South Carolina

William Hiram Brawley (incorrectly reported in some works as William Huggins Brawley; May 13, 1841 – November 15, 1916) was a United States representative from South Carolina and later a United States district judge of the United States District Court for the District of South Carolina.

== Education and career ==
Born on May 13, 1841, in Chester, South Carolina, Brawley attended the common schools and graduated from South Carolina College (now the University of South Carolina) in 1860. He enlisted as a private in Company F, Sixth Regiment, South Carolina Infantry, Confederate States Army on April 11, 1861. He lost an arm in the Battle of Seven Pines and was retired from service. He was manager of his family's plantation from 1862 to 1864. He traveled and studied in Europe in 1864 and 1865. He was admitted to the bar and entered private practice in Chester from 1866 to 1868. He was solicitor for the Sixth Judicial Circuit of South Carolina from 1868 to 1874. He resumed private practice in Charleston, South Carolina from 1874 to 1893. He was a member of the South Carolina House of Representatives from 1882 to 1890.

== Congressional service ==
Brawley was elected as a Democrat from South Carolina's 1st congressional district to the United States House of Representatives of the 52nd and 53rd United States Congresses and served from March 4, 1891, until February 12, 1894, when he resigned to accept a federal judicial post.

== Federal judicial service ==
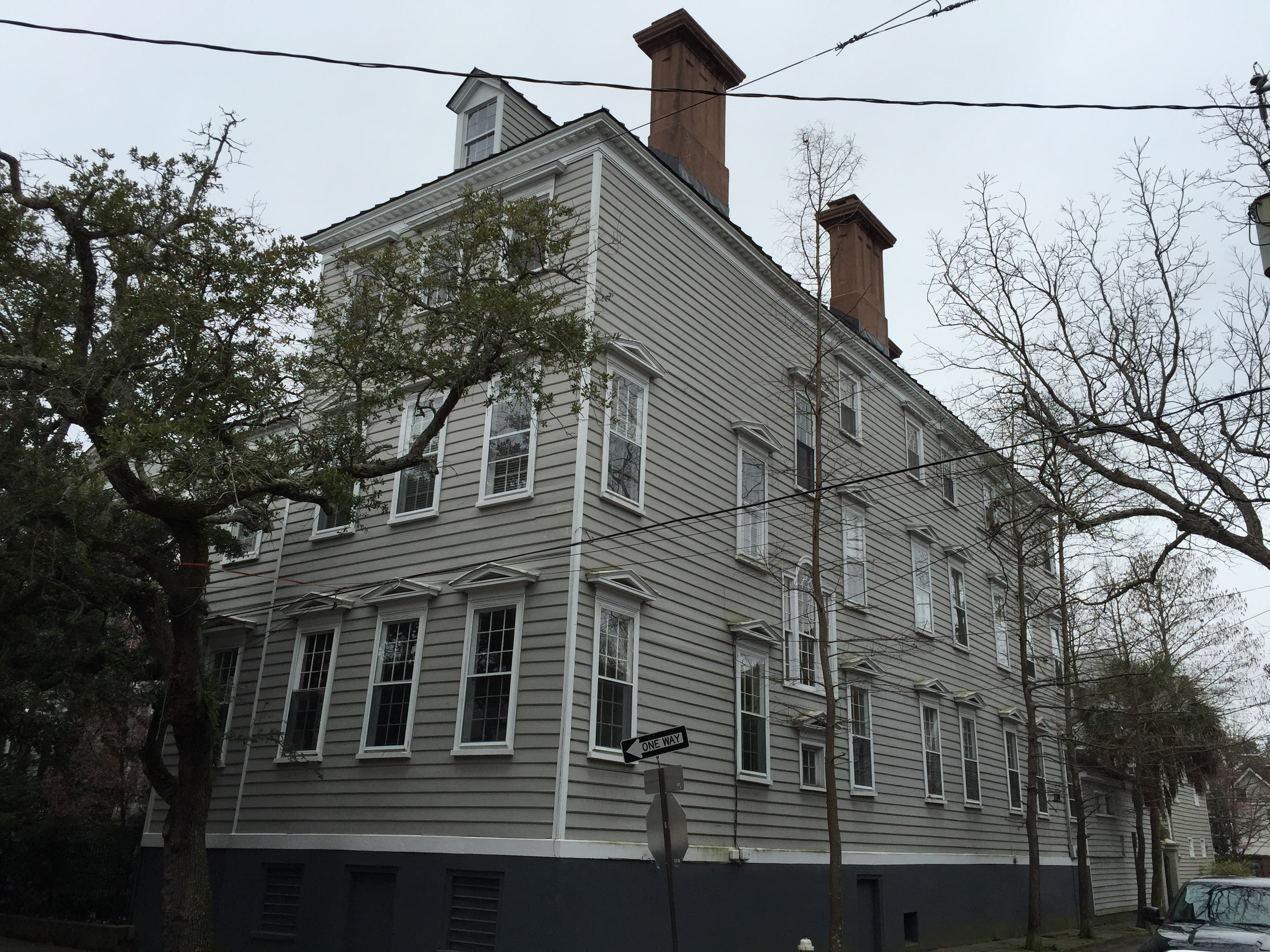
Throughout his time as a federal judge, Brawley lived at 9 Legare Street, Charleston, South Carolina.

Brawley was nominated by President Grover Cleveland on December 20, 1893, to a seat on the United States District Court for the District of South Carolina vacated by Judge Charles Henry Simonton. He was confirmed by the United States Senate on January 18, 1894, and received his commission the same day. His service terminated on June 14, 1911, due to his retirement.

== Death ==
Following his retirement from the federal bench, Brawley lived in retirement in Charleston. He died on November 15, 1916, in Charleston. He was interred in Magnolia Cemetery in Charleston.

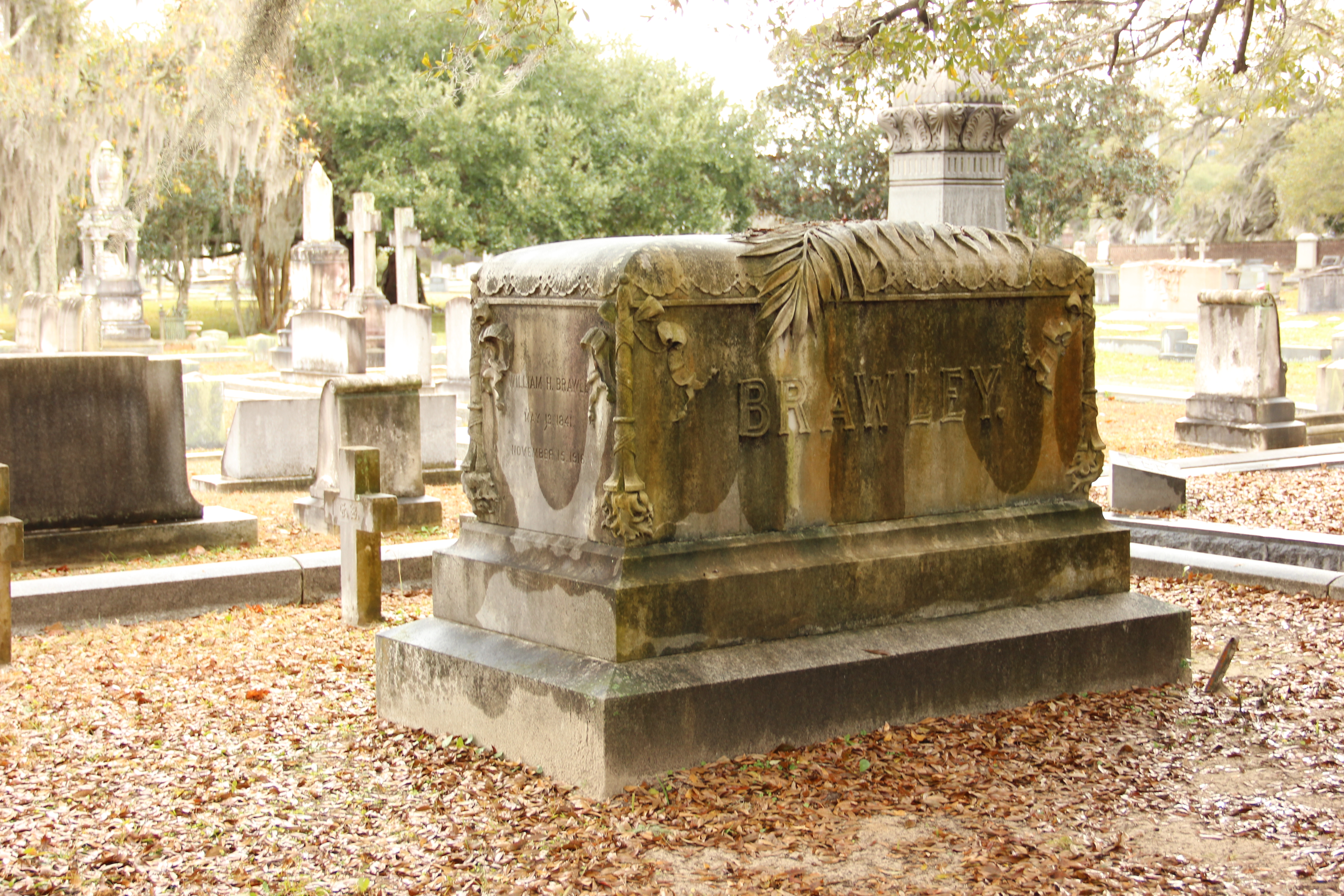
Brawley's grave

== Family ==
Brawley was the cousin of John J. Hemphill and great-uncle of Robert W. Hemphill.

== Sources ==
- United States Congress. "William H. Brawley (id: B000775)". Biographical Directory of the United States Congress.
- William Hiram Brawley at the Biographical Directory of Federal Judges, a publication of the Federal Judicial Center.

U.S. House of Representatives
Preceded by Samuel Dibble	Member of the U.S. House of Representatives from South Carolina's 1st congressional district 1891–1894	Succeeded by James F. Izlar
Legal offices
Preceded by Charles Henry Simonton	Judge of the United States District Court for the District of South Carolina; 1894–1911	Succeeded by Henry Augustus Middleton Smith
