= Francis Kerschner Myers =

American judge

Judge of the United States District Court for the Eastern District of South Carolina
- In office June 14, 1934 – August 2, 1940
- Appointed by: Franklin D. Roosevelt
- Preceded by: Ernest Ford Cochran
- Succeeded by: Julius Waties Waring

Personal details
- Born: Francis Kerschner Myers; March 7, 1874 Wilmington, North Carolina, U.S.
- Died: August 2, 1940 (aged 66)
- Education: read law

Francis Kerschner Myers (March 7, 1874 – August 2, 1940) was a United States district judge of the United States District Court for the Eastern District of South Carolina.

== Education and career ==
Born in Wilmington, North Carolina, Myers read law to enter the bar in 1896. He was in private practice in Charleston, South Carolina from 1896 to 1908. He was a law clerk and court reporter for the Charleston Circuit Court from 1898 to 1908. He was a master in equity for the Charleston County Court of Equity from 1908 to 1934.

== Federal judicial service ==
On June 6, 1934, Myers was nominated by President Franklin D. Roosevelt to a seat on the United States District Court for the Eastern District of South Carolina vacated by Judge Ernest Ford Cochran. Myers was confirmed by the United States Senate on June 9, 1934, and received his commission on June 14, 1934. Myers served in that capacity until his death on August 2, 1940.

== Sources ==
Legal offices
Preceded by Ernest Ford Cochran	Judge of the United States District Court for the Eastern District of South Carolina; 1934–1940	Succeeded by Julius Waties Waring
