= Henry Augustus Middleton Smith =

American judge

Senior Judge of the United States District Court for the Eastern District of South Carolina
- In office November 23, 1923 – November 23, 1924

Judge of the United States District Court for the Eastern District of South Carolina
- In office January 1, 1912 – November 23, 1923
- Appointed by: operation of law
- Preceded by: Seat established by 36 Stat. 1087
- Succeeded by: Ernest Ford Cochran

Judge of the United States District Court for the Western District of South Carolina
- In office January 1, 1912 – March 3, 1915
- Appointed by: operation of law
- Preceded by: Seat established by 36 Stat. 1087
- Succeeded by: Seat abolished

Judge of the United States District Court for the District of South Carolina
- In office June 7, 1911 – January 1, 1912
- Appointed by: William Howard Taft
- Preceded by: William H. Brawley
- Succeeded by: Seat abolished

Personal details
- Born: Henry Augustus Middleton Smith; April 30, 1853 Charleston, South Carolina
- Died: November 23, 1924 (aged 71)
- Education: College of Charleston (B.A.) read law

Henry Augustus Middleton Smith (April 30, 1853 – November 23, 1924) was a United States district judge of the United States District Court for the District of South Carolina, the United States District Court for the Eastern District of South Carolina and the United States District Court for the Western District of South Carolina.

== Education and career ==
Born in Charleston, South Carolina, Smith received a Bachelor of Arts degree from the College of Charleston in 1872 and read law to enter the bar in 1874. He was in private practice in Charleston from 1877 to 1911.

== Federal judicial service ==
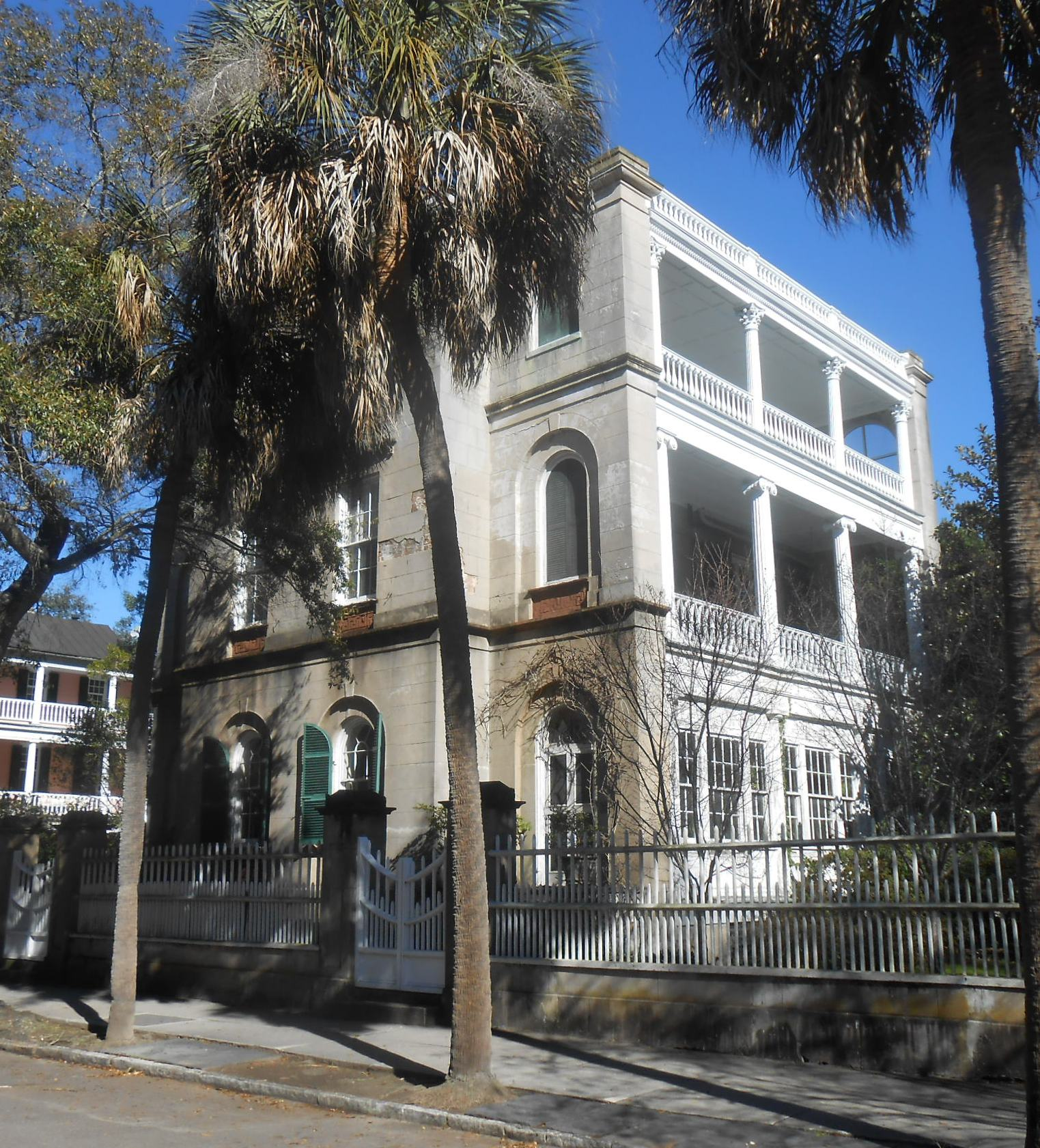
Throughout his time as a federal judge, Smith lived at 26 Meeting Street, Charleston, South Carolina.

Smith was nominated by President William Howard Taft on May 25, 1911, to a seat on the United States District Court for the District of South Carolina vacated by Judge William H. Brawley. He was confirmed by the United States Senate on June 7, 1911, and received his commission the same day. Smith was reassigned by operation of law to the United States District Court for the Eastern District of South Carolina and the United States District Court for the Western District of South Carolina on January 1, 1912, to a new joint seat authorized by 36 Stat. 1087. He was reassigned by operation of law to serve only in the Eastern District on March 3, 1915. He assumed senior status on November 23, 1923. His service terminated on November 23, 1924, due to his death.

== See also ==
- Edmondston-Alston House

== Sources ==
Legal offices
Preceded by William H. Brawley	Judge of the United States District Court for the District of South Carolina; 1911–1912	Succeeded by Seat abolished
Preceded by Seat established by 36 Stat. 1087	Judge of the United States District Court for the Western District of South Carolina; 1912–1915	Succeeded by Seat abolished
Preceded by Seat established by 36 Stat. 1087	Judge of the United States District Court for the Eastern District of South Carolina; 1912–1923	Succeeded by Ernest Ford Cochran
