= List of former United States district courts =

The following are former United States district courts which ceased to exist because they were subdivided into smaller units. With the exception of California, each of these courts initially covered an entire U.S. state, and was subdivided as the jurisdictions which they covered increased in population. Two of the district courts—those of South Carolina and New Jersey—were subdivided but later recreated. Every change to the divisions and boundaries of these courts is effected by an act of the United States Congress, and for each such action, the statutory reference is identified.

== Alabama ==
The United States District Court for the District of Alabama was created on April 21, 1820, by 3 Stat. 564. It was subdivided into Northern and Southern Districts on March 10, 1824, by 4 Stat. 9. The Middle District was subsequently formed from parts of these two districts on February 6, 1839, by 5 Stat. 315, with legislation specifying that the Middle District Court was to be held at Tuscaloosa, the Northern District Court at Huntsville, and the Southern District Court at Mobile. The Districts were reorganized on August 7, 1848. Only one judge was ever appointed to the District of Alabama.

#	Judge	Born–died	Active service	Chief Judge	Senior status	Appointed by	Reason for termination
1	Charles Tait	1768–1835	1820–1824	—	—	Monroe	reassignment

Seat 1
Seat established on April 21, 1820 by 3 Stat. 564
Tait	1820–1824
Seat reassigned to Northern and Southern Districts on March 10, 1824 by 4 Stat. 9

== Arkansas ==
Arkansas, originally part of the Louisiana Purchase, became part of the Missouri Territory in 1812, when Louisiana became a state. When Missouri became a state in 1819, a territorial government, including a territorial court, was organized for Arkansas, taking effect on July 4, 1819. The United States District Court for the District of Arkansas was established with a single judge when Arkansas became a state, on June 15, 1836, by 5 Stat. 50, 51. The court was subdivided into Eastern and the Western Districts on March 3, 1851, by 9 Stat. 594.

#	Judge	Born–died	Active service	Chief Judge	Senior status	Appointed by	Reason for termination
1	Benjamin Johnson	1784–1849	1836–1849	—	—	Jackson	death
2	Daniel Ringo	1803–1873	1849–1851	—	—	Taylor	reassignment

Seat 1
Seat established on June 15, 1836 by 5 Stat. 50
Johnson	1836–1849
Ringo	1849–1851
Seat reassigned to Eastern and Western Districts on March 3, 1851 by 9 Stat. 594

== California ==
The United States District Court for the District of California existed from 1866 to 1886. California was admitted as a state on September 9, 1850, and was initially divided into two districts, the Northern and the Southern, by Act of Congress approved September 28 9 Stat. 521. The boundary line was at the 37th parallel north. The creating act provided that:

In addition to the ordinary jurisdiction and powers of a District Court of the United States, with which the Southern District Court of New York has been invested, the said Courts be and hereby are invested respectively within the limits of its district with the exercise of concurrent jurisdiction and power in all civil cases now exercised by the Circuit Courts of the United States; and that in all cases where said Courts shall exercise such jurisdiction, appeals may be taken from the judgments, orders or decrees of said Courts to the Supreme Court of the United States.

On February 27, 1851, President Millard Fillmore appointed Ogden Hoffman Jr., as the judge presiding over the Northern District. The Act of August 31, 1852, made the Judge of the Northern District be Judge of the Southern District as well until otherwise provided, by 10 Stat. 76, 84, effectively creating a single District in all but name until an Act of January 18, 1854 provided for the appointment of a Judge for the Southern District. The Southern District of California was abolished and the State made to constitute one district by Act of Congress approved July 27, 1866, 14 Stat. 300.

Twenty years later, on August 5, 1886, Congress re-created the Southern District of California (and, by extension, the Northern District) by 24 Stat. 308. Hoffman, who had continued serving as the sole district judge, again became judge of the Northern district only, there continuing in service for five more years. Erskine Mayo Ross was appointed Judge of the new Southern District and served until his promotion to the Circuit Judgeship, when he was succeeded by Olin Wellborn.

On March 18, 1966, the Eastern and Central Districts were created from portions of the Northern and Southern Districts by 80 Stat. 75.

#	Judge	Born–died	Active service	Chief Judge	Senior status	Appointed by	Reason for termination
1	Ogden Hoffman Jr.	1822–1891	1866–1886	—	—	Fillmore / Operation of law	reassignment

Seat 1
Seat established on July 27, 1866 by 14 Stat. 300
Hoffman, Jr.	1866–1886
Seat reassigned to Northern District on August 5, 1886 by 24 Stat. 308

== Florida ==
On the same day that Florida was admitted as a state, March 3, 1845, Congress enacted legislation creating the United States District Court for the District of Florida, 5 Stat. 788. On February 23, 1847, 9 Stat. 131 divided the jurisdiction of this court between the Northern District and a Southern District Courts with the boundary between as:

[T]hat part of the State of Florida lying south of a line drawn due east and west from the northern point of Charlotte Harbor, including the islands, keys, reefs, shoals, harbors, bays and inlets, south of said line, shall be erected into a new judicial district, to be called the Southern District of Florida; a District Court shall be held in said Southern District, to consist of one judge, who shall reside at Key West, in said district...

The same statute directed the Northern District to hold court at Apalachicola, Florida, and Pensacola, Florida.

On July 30, 1962, the Middle District was created from portions of the other districts by 76 Stat. 247.

#	Judge	Born–died	Active service	Chief Judge	Senior status	Appointed by	Reason for termination
1	Isaac H. Bronson	1802–1855	1846–1847	—	—	Polk	reassignment

Seat 1
Seat established on March 3, 1845 by 5 Stat. 788
Bronson	1846–1847
Seat reassigned to Northern District on February 23, 1847 by 9 Stat. 131

== Georgia ==
The United States District Court for the District of Georgia was one of the original 13 courts established by the Judiciary Act of 1789, 1 Stat. 73, on September 24, 1789. The District was subdivided into Northern and Southern Districts on August 11, 1848, by 9 Stat. 280. The Middle District was formed from portions of those two Districts on May 28, 1926, by 44 Stat. 670.

#	Judge	Born–died	Active service	Chief Judge	Senior status	Appointed by	Reason for termination
1	Nathaniel Pendleton	1756–1821	1789–1796	—	—	Washington	resignation
2	Joseph Clay Jr.	1764–1811	1796–1801	—	—	Washington	resignation
3	William Stephens	1752–1819	1801–1818	—	—	Jefferson	resignation
4	William Davies	1775–1829	1819–1821	—	—	Monroe	resignation
5	Jeremiah La Touche Cuyler	1768–1839	1821–1839	—	—	Monroe	death
6	John Cochran Nicoll	1793–1863	1839–1848	—	—	Van Buren	reassignment

Seat 1
Seat established on September 24, 1789 by 1 Stat. 73
Pendleton	1789–1796
Clay	1796–1801
Stephens	1801–1818
Davies	1819–1821
Cuyler	1821–1839
Nicoll	1839–1848
Seat reassigned to Northern and Southern Districts on August 11, 1848 by 9 Stat. 280

== Illinois ==
Map of the changing Districts of Illinois.

The United States District Court for the District of Illinois was established by a statute passed by the United States Congress on March 3, 1819, 3 Stat. 502. The act established a single office for a judge to preside over the court. Initially, the court was not within any existing judicial circuit, and appeals from the court were taken directly to the United States Supreme Court. In 1837, Congress created the United States Court of Appeals for the Seventh Circuit, placing it in Chicago, Illinois and giving it jurisdiction over the District of Illinois, 5 Stat. 176. The District itself was eliminated by a statute passed on February 13, 1855, 10 Stat. 606, under which it was subdivided into the Northern and the Southern Districts. The boundaries of the District and the seats of the courts were set forth in the statute:

The counties of Hancock, McDonough, Peoria, Woodford, Livingston, and Iroquois, and all the counties in the said State north of them, shall compose one district, to be called the northern district of Illinois, and courts shall be held for the said district at the city of Chicago; and the residue of the counties of the said State shall compose another district, to be called the southern district of Illinois, and courts shall be held for the same at the city of Springfield.

The district has since been re-organized several times. The United States District Court for the Eastern District of Illinois was created on March 3, 1905, by 33 Stat. 992, by splitting counties out of the Northern and Southern Districts. It was later eliminated in a reorganization on October 2, 1978, which replaced it with a Central District, 92 Stat. 883, also formed from parts of the Northern and Southern Districts.

#	Judge	Born–died	Active service	Chief Judge	Senior status	Appointed by	Reason for termination
1	Nathaniel Pope	1784–1850	1819–1850	—	—	Monroe	death
2	Thomas Drummond	1809–1890	1850–1855	—	—	Taylor	reassignment

Seat 1
Seat established on March 3, 1819 by 3 Stat. 502
Pope	1819–1850
Drummond	1850–1855
Seat reassigned to Northern District on February 13, 1855 by 10 Stat. 606

== Indiana ==
The United States District Court for the District of Indiana was established on March 3, 1817, by 3 Stat. 390. The District was subdivided into Northern and Southern Districts on April 21, 1928, by 45 Stat. 437. Of all district courts that have been subdivided, Indiana existed for the longest time as a single court, 111 years.

#	Judge	Born–died	Active service	Chief Judge	Senior status	Appointed by	Reason for termination
1	Benjamin Parke	1777–1835	1817–1835	—	—	Monroe	death
2	Jesse Lynch Holman	1784–1842	1835–1842	—	—	Jackson	death
3	Elisha Mills Huntington	1806–1862	1842–1862	—	—	Tyler	death
4	Caleb Blood Smith	1808–1864	1862–1864	—	—	Lincoln	death
5	Albert Smith White	1803–1864	1864	—	—	Lincoln	death
6	David McDonald	1803–1869	1864–1869	—	—	Lincoln	death
7	Walter Q. Gresham	1832–1895	1869–1883	—	—	Grant	resignation
8	William Allen Woods	1837–1901	1883–1892	—	—	Arthur	elevation
9	John Baker	1832–1915	1892–1902	—	—	B. Harrison	retirement
10	Albert B. Anderson	1857–1938	1902–1925	—	—	T. Roosevelt	elevation
11	Robert C. Baltzell	1879–1950	1925–1928	—	—	Coolidge	reassignment
12	Thomas Whitten Slick	1869–1959	1925–1928	—	—	Coolidge	reassignment

Seat 1
Seat established on March 3, 1817 by 3 Stat. 390
Parke	1817–1835
Holman	1835–1842
Huntington	1842–1862
Smith	1862–1864
White	1864
McDonald	1864–1869
Gresham	1869–1883
Woods	1883–1892
Baker	1892–1902
Anderson	1902–1925
Baltzell	1925–1928
Seat reassigned to Southern District on April 21, 1928 by 45 Stat. 437

Seat 2
Seat established on January 16, 1925 by 43 Stat. 751
Slick	1925–1928
Seat reassigned to Northern District on April 21, 1928 by 45 Stat. 437

== Iowa ==
The United States District Court for the District of Iowa was established on March 3, 1845, by 5 Stat. 789. The District was subdivided into Northern and Southern Districts on July 20, 1882, by 22 Stat. 172.

#	Judge	Born–died	Active service	Chief Judge	Senior status	Appointed by	Reason for termination
1	John James Dyer	1809–1855	1847–1855	—	—	Polk	death
2	James M. Love	1820–1891	1855–1882	—	—	Pierce	reassignment

Seat 1
Seat established on March 3, 1845 by 5 Stat. 789
Dyer	1847–1855
Love	1855–1882
Seat reassigned to Southern District on July 20, 1882 by 22 Stat. 172

== Kentucky ==
The United States District Court for the District of Kentucky was part of one of the original 13 courts established by the Judiciary Act of 1789, 1 Stat. 73, on September 24, 1789. At the time, Kentucky was not yet a state, but was within the territory of the state of Virginia. The District was unchanged when Kentucky became a state on June 1, 1792. On February 13, 1801, the Judiciary Act of 1801, 2 Stat. 89, abolished the U.S. district court in Kentucky, but the repeal of this Act restored the District on March 8, 1802, 2 Stat. 132. The District was subdivided into Eastern and Western Districts on February 12, 1901, by 31 Stat. 781.

#	Judge	Born–died	Active service	Chief Judge	Senior status	Appointed by	Reason for termination
1	Harry Innes	1752–1816	1789–1816	—	—	Washington	death
2	Robert Trimble	1776–1828	1817–1826	—	—	Madison	elevation
3	John Boyle	1774–1834	1826–1834	—	—	J.Q. Adams	death
4	Thomas Bell Monroe	1791–1865	1834–1861	—	—	Jackson	resignation
5	Bland Ballard	1819–1879	1861–1879	—	—	Lincoln	death
6	William Hercules Hays	1820–1880	1879–1880	—	—	Hayes	death
7	John W. Barr	1826–1907	1880–1899	—	—	Hayes	retirement
8	Walter Evans	1842–1923	1899–1901	—	—	McKinley	reassignment

Seat 1
Seat established on September 24, 1789 by 1 Stat. 73
Innes	1789–1816
Trimble	1817–1826
Boyle	1826–1834
Monroe	1834–1861
Ballard	1861–1879
Hays	1879–1880
Barr	1880–1899
Evans	1899–1901
Seat reassigned to Western District on July 1, 1901 by 31 Stat. 781

== Louisiana ==
On March 26, 1804, Congress organized the Territory of Orleans and created the United States District Court for the District of Orleans – the first time Congress provided a territory with a district court equal in its authority and jurisdiction to those of the states. The United States District Court for the District of Louisiana was established on April 8, 1812, by 2 Stat. 701, several weeks before Louisiana was formally admitted as a state of the union. The District was thereafter subdivided and reformed several times. It was first subdivided into Eastern and Western Districts on March 3, 1823, by 3 Stat. 774.

On February 13, 1845, Louisiana was reorganized into a single District with one judgeship, by 5 Stat. 722, but was again divided into Eastern and the Western Districts on March 3, 1849, by 9 Stat. 401. Congress again abolished the Western District of Louisiana and reorganized Louisiana as a single judicial district on July 27, 1866, by 14 Stat. 300. On March 3, 1881, by 21 Stat. 507, Louisiana was for a third time divided into Eastern and the Western Districts, with one judgeship authorized for each. The Middle District was formed from portions of those two Districts on December 18, 1971, by 85 Stat. 741.

During the course of its frequent subdivisions and reunifications, four judges served as judge of the District of Louisiana: Dominic Augustin Hall, (1812–1820), John Dick, (1821–1823), Theodore Howard McCaleb (1845–1849), and Edward Henry Durell (1866–1874). Hall was appointed to the District of Louisiana twice. He briefly resigned from the District Court to serve as a Justice of the Louisiana Supreme Court. He was shortly thereafter reappointed to the same seat on the District Court, which had remained vacant in his absence.

#	Judge	Born–died	Active service	Chief Judge	Senior status	Appointed by	Reason for termination
1	Dominic Augustin Hall	1765–1820	1812–1813; 1813–1820	—	—	Madison; Madison	resignation death
2	John Dick	1788–1824	1820–1823	—	—	Monroe	reassignment
3	Theodore Howard McCaleb	1810–1864	1845–1849	—	—	Tyler/Operation of law	reassignment
4	Edward Henry Durell	1810–1887	1866–1874	—	—	Lincoln/Operation of law	resignation
5	Edward Coke Billings	1829–1893	1876–1881	—	—	Grant	reassignment

Seat 1
Seat established on April 8, 1812 by 2 Stat. 701
Hall	1812–1813
Hall	1813–1820
Dick	1821–1823
Seat reassigned to Eastern and Western Districts on March 3, 1823 by 3 Stat. 774
Seat reassigned from Eastern and Western Districts on February 13, 1845 by 5 Stat. 772
McCaleb	1845–1849
Seat reassigned to Eastern District on March 3, 1849 by 9 Stat. 401
Seat reassigned from Eastern District on July 27, 1866 by 14 Stat. 300
Durell	1866–1874
Billings	1876–1881
Seat reassigned to Eastern District on March 3, 1881 by 21 Stat. 507

== Michigan ==
The United States District Court for the District of Michigan was established on July 1, 1836, by 5 Stat. 61, with a single judgeship. The district court was not assigned to a judicial circuit, but was granted the same jurisdiction as United States circuit courts, except in appeals and writs of error, which were the jurisdiction of the Supreme Court. Due to the so-called "Toledo War", a boundary dispute with Ohio, Michigan did not become a state of the Union until January 26, 1837. On March 3, 1837, Congress passed an act that repealed the circuit court jurisdiction of the U.S. District Court for the District of Michigan, assigned the District of Michigan to the Seventh Circuit, and established a U.S. circuit court for the district, 5 Stat. 176.

On July 15, 1862, Congress reorganized the circuits and assigned Michigan to the Eighth Circuit by 12 Stat. 576, and on January 28, 1863, the Congress again reorganized the Seventh and Eight Circuits and assigned Michigan to the Seventh Circuit, by 12 Stat. 637. On February 24, 1863, Congress divided the District of Michigan into the Eastern and the Western Districts, with one judgeship authorized for each district, by 12 Stat. 660.

Ross Wilkins was the only district judge to serve the District of Michigan. He was nominated by President Andrew Jackson on July 2, 1836, to the newly created seat, and was confirmed by the United States Senate on July 2, 1836. He received his commission on January 26, 1837. Upon termination of the District of Michigan, Wilkins was reassigned to the Eastern District of Michigan.

#	Judge	Born–died	Active service	Chief Judge	Senior status	Appointed by	Reason for termination
1	Ross Wilkins	1799–1872	1837–1863	—	—	Jackson	reassignment

Seat 1
Seat established on July 1, 1836 by 5 Stat. 61
Wilkins	1837–1863
Seat reassigned to Eastern District on February 24, 1863 by 12 Stat. 660

== Mississippi ==
The United States District Court for the District of Mississippi was established on April 3, 1818, by 3 Stat. 413. It existed for over twenty years, and was subdivided into Northern and Southern Districts on June 18, 1838, by 5 Stat. 247:

The State of Mississippi, at the date of the act of March 3, 1837... constituted one district, in which the District Court was invested with the powers of a Circuit Court. By that act the extraordinary jurisdiction of the District Court was abrogated. But by the acts of June 18, 1838, and of February 16, 1839, the district of Mississippi was divided into two districts, the Northern and Southern; and by the latter act the powers of a Circuit Court were conferred on the District Court for the Northern District.

#	Judge	Born–died	Active service	Chief Judge	Senior status	Appointed by	Reason for termination
1	William Bayard Shields	1780–1823	1818–1823	—	—	Monroe	death
2	Peter Randolph	1779–1832	1823–1832	—	—	Monroe	death
3	Powhatan Ellis	1790–1863	1832–1836	—	—	Jackson	resignation
4	George Adams	1784–1844	1836–1838	—	—	Jackson	reassignment

Seat 1
Seat established on April 3, 1818 by 3 Stat. 413
Shields	1818–1823
Randolph	1823–1832
Ellis	1832–1836
Adams	1836–1838
Seat reassigned to Northern and Southern Districts on June 18, 1838 by 5 Stat. 247

== Missouri ==
The United States District Court for the District of Missouri was established on March 16, 1822, by 3 Stat. 653. However, an act of Congress passed in 1845 and upheld by the United States Supreme Court in 1851, extending federal admiralty jurisdiction to inland waterways, resulted in a substantial increase in the number of admiralty cases arising from traffic on the Mississippi River. These disputes involved "contracts of affreightment, collisions, mariners' wages, and other causes of admiralty jurisdiction", and litigants of matters arising in the port city of St. Louis found it inconvenient to travel far inland to Jefferson City for their cases to be tried. The District was therefore subdivided into Eastern and Western Districts on March 3, 1857, by 11 Stat. 197.

#	Judge	Born–died	Active service	Chief Judge	Senior status	Appointed by	Reason for termination
1	James H. Peck	1790–1836	1822–1836	—	—	Monroe	death
2	Robert William Wells	1795–1864	1836–1857	—	—	Jackson	reassignment

Seat 1
Seat established on March 16, 1822 by 3 Stat. 653
Peck	1822–1836
Wells	1836–1857
Seat reassigned to Western District on March 3, 1857 by 11 Stat. 197

== New Jersey ==
The United States District Court for the District of New Jersey was one of the original 13 courts established by the Judiciary Act of 1789, 1 Stat. 73, on September 24, 1789. The District was subdivided into the United States District Court for the Eastern District of New Jersey and the United States District Court for the Western District of New Jersey on February 13, 1801, by the Judiciary Act of 1801, 2 Stat. 89, with the judicial districts being headquartered in New Brunswick and Burlington, respectively. The repeal of the 1801 Act on March 8, 1802, by 2 Stat. 132, restored New Jersey as a single judicial district. The only judge to serve on the briefly subdivided courts was Robert Morris, who had begun serving as a recess appointment to the District of New Jersey on August 28, 1790, and continued serving after the restoration of the single court, until June 2, 1815.

#	Judge	Born–died	Active service	Chief Judge	Senior status	Appointed by	Reason for termination
1	Robert Morris	1745–1815	1801–1802	—	—	Washington/Operation of law	reassignment

Seat 1
Seat reassigned from the District of New Jersey on February 13, 1801 by 2 Stat. 89
Morris	1801–1802
Seat reassigned to the District of New Jersey on June 1, 1802 by 2 Stat. 132

== New York ==
The United States District Court for the District of New York was one of the original 13 courts established by the Judiciary Act of 1789, 1 Stat. 73, on September 24, 1789. It existed for nearly twenty-five years before, on April 9, 1814, New York was divided into Northern and Southern Districts by 3 Stat. 120. These Districts were later further subdivided with the creation of Eastern District on February 25, 1865, by 13 Stat. 438, and the Western District on May 12, 1900, by 31 Stat. 175.

#	Judge	Born–died	Active service	Chief Judge	Senior status	Appointed by	Reason for termination
1	James Duane	1733–1797	1789–1794	—	—	Washington	resignation
2	John Laurance	1750–1810	1794–1796	—	—	Washington	resignation
3	Robert Troup	1757–1832	1796–1798	—	—	Washington	resignation
4	John Sloss Hobart	1738–1805	1798–1805	—	—	J. Adams	death
5	Matthias B. Tallmadge	1774–1819	1805–1812	—	—	Jefferson	reassignment
6	William P. Van Ness	1778–1826	1812–1814	—	—	Madison	reassignment

Seat 1
Seat established on September 24, 1789 by 1 Stat. 73
Duane	1789–1794
Laurance	1794–1796
Troup	1796–1798
Hobart	1798–1805
Tallmadge	1805–1814
Seat reassigned to Northern District on April 9, 1814 by 3 Stat. 120

Seat 2
Seat established on April 29, 1812 by 2 Stat. 719
Van Ness	1812–1814
Seat reassigned to Southern District on April 9, 1814 by 3 Stat. 120

== North Carolina ==
The United States District Court for the District of North Carolina has a unique history among defunct district courts. It was established on June 4, 1790, by 1 Stat. 126. On June 9, 1794, it was subdivided into three districts by 1 Stat. 395, but on March 3, 1797, the three districts were abolished and the single District restored by 1 Stat. 517, until April 29, 1802, when the state was again subdivided into three different districts by 2 Stat. 156.

In both instances, these districts, unlike those with geographic designations that existed in other states, were titled by the names of the cities in which the courts sat. After the first division, they were styled the District of Edenton, the District of New Bern, and the District of Wilmington; after the second division, they were styled the District of Albemarle, the District of Cape Fear, and the District of Pamptico. However, in both instances, only one judge was authorized to serve all three districts, causing them to effectively operate as a single district. The latter combination was occasionally referred to by the cumbersome title of the United States District Court for the Albemarle, Cape Fear & Pamptico Districts of North Carolina. Judge Henry Potter's 55 years of service on this court during the period in which the state contained a single district, from April 1802 to December 1857, represents one of the longest terms ever held by a United States federal judge.

On June 4, 1872, North Carolina was re-divided into two Districts, Eastern and Western, by 17 Stat. 215. The Middle District was created from portions of the Eastern and Western Districts on March 2, 1927, by 44 Stat. 1339.

#	Judge	Born–died	Active service	Chief Judge	Senior status	Appointed by	Reason for termination
1	John Stokes	1756–1790	1790	—	—	Washington	death
2	John Sitgreaves	1757–1802	1790–1802	—	—	Washington	death
3	Henry Potter	1766–1857	1802–1857	—	—	Jefferson	death
4	Asa Biggs	1811–1878	1858–1861	—	—	Buchanan	resignation
5	George Washington Brooks	1821–1882	1865–1872	—	—	A. Johnson	reassignment

Seat 1
Seat established on June 4, 1790 by 1 Stat. 126
Stokes	1790
Sitgreaves	1790–1802
Potter	1802–1857
Biggs	1858–1861
Brooks	1865–1872
Seat reassigned to Eastern District on June 4, 1872 by 17 Stat. 215

== Ohio ==
The United States District Court for the District of Ohio was established on February 19, 1803, by 2 Stat. 201. The District was subdivided into Northern and Southern Districts on February 10, 1855, by 10 Stat. 604.

#	Judge	Born–died	Active service	Chief Judge	Senior status	Appointed by	Reason for termination
1	Charles Willing Byrd	1756–1790	1803–1828	—	—	Jefferson	death
2	William Creighton Jr.	1778–1851	1828–1829	—	—	J.Q. Adams	not confirmed
3	John Wilson Campbell	1782–1833	1829–1833	—	—	Jackson	death
4	Benjamin Tappan	1773–1857	1833–1834	—	—	Jackson	not confirmed
5	Humphrey H. Leavitt	1796–1873	1834–1855	—	—	Jackson	reassignment

Seat 1
Seat established on February 19, 1803 by 2 Stat. 201
Byrd	1803–1828
Creighton	1828–1829
Campbell	1829–1833
Tappan	1833–1834
Leavitt	1834–1855
Seat reassigned to Southern District on February 10, 1855 by 10 Stat. 604

Term start	Term end	United States Attorney
1802	1803	William McMillan
1803	1804	Michael Baldwin
1804	1810	William Creighton Jr.
1810	1818	Samuel Herrick
1818	1823	John Crafts Wright
1823	1830	Joseph Benham
1830	1839	Noah Haynes Swayne
1839	1841	Israel Hamilton
1841	1846	Charles Anthony
1846	1850	Thomas W. Bartley
1850	1854	Samson Mason
1854	1855	Daniel O. Morton

== Pennsylvania ==
The United States District Court for the District of Pennsylvania was one of the original 13 courts established by the Judiciary Act of 1789, 1 Stat. 73, on September 24, 1789. It was subdivided on April 20, 1818, by 3 Stat. 462, into the Eastern and Western Districts, to be headquartered in Philadelphia and Pittsburgh, respectively. Portions of these districts were subsequently subdivided into the Middle District on March 2, 1901, by 31 Stat. 880.

#	Judge	Born–died	Active service	Chief Judge	Senior status	Appointed by	Reason for termination
1	Francis Hopkinson	1737–1791	1789–1791	—	—	Washington	death
2	William Lewis	1752–1819	1791–1792	—	—	Washington	resignation
3	Richard Peters	1744–1828	1792–1818	—	—	Washington	reassignment

Seat 1
Seat established on September 24, 1789 by 1 Stat. 73
Hopkinson	1789–1791
Lewis	1791–1792
Peters	1792–1818
Seat reassigned to Eastern District on April 20, 1818 by 3 Stat. 462

== South Carolina ==
The United States District Court for the District of South Carolina was one of the original 13 courts established by the Judiciary Act of 1789, 1 Stat. 73, on September 24, 1789. It was subdivided into the United States District Court for the Eastern District of South Carolina and the United States District Court for the Western District of South Carolina Districts on February 21, 1823, by 3 Stat. 726. The Eastern District was headquartered at Florence, and the Western District was headquartered in Greenville. The division was solely for the purposes of holding court – a single judge presided over both districts, and the act authorized no additional court staff.

In 1898 the United States Supreme Court held in Barrett v. United States that South Carolina legally constituted a single judicial district. Congress made a more explicit effort to subdivide the District on March 3, 1911, by 36 Stat. 1087, 36 Stat. 1123. South Carolina was again Eastern and the Western Districts, with one judgeship authorized to serve both districts, effective January 1, 1912. Congress finally authorized an additional judgeship for the Western District, and assigned the sitting judge exclusively to the Eastern District, on March 3, 1915, by 38 Stat. 961. However, on October 7, 1965, by 79 Stat. 951, South Carolina was reorganized as a single judicial district with four judgeships authorized for the district court, and it has since remained a single District.

Judges of the Eastern District of South Carolina:

#	Judge	Born–died	Active service	Chief Judge	Senior status	Appointed by	Reason for termination
1	Henry Smith	1853–1923	1912–1923	—	—	Taft/Operation of law	death
2	Ernest Ford Cochran	1865–1934	1923–1934	—	—	Coolidge	death
3	John Lyles Glenn Jr.	1892–1938	1929–1938	—	—	Hoover	death
4	Francis Kerschner Myers	1874–1940	1934–1940	—	—	F. Roosevelt	death
5	Alva M. Lumpkin	1886–1941	1939–1941	—	—	F. Roosevelt	death
6	George Timmerman Sr.	1881–1966	1942–1962	1952–1962	1962–1965	F. Roosevelt	reassignment
7	Julius Waties Waring	1880–1968	1942–1952	1948–1952	1952–1965	F. Roosevelt	reassignment
8	Ashton Hilliard Williams	1891–1962	1952–1962	—	—	Truman	death
9	James Robert Martin Jr.	1909–1984	1961–1965	—	—	Kennedy	reassignment
10	Robert W. Hemphill	1915–1984	1964–1965	1964–1965	—	L. Johnson	reassignment
11	Charles Earl Simons Jr.	1916–1999	1964–1965	—	—	L. Johnson	reassignment

Chief Judge
Waring	1948–1952
Timmerman	1952–1962
Hemphill	1964–1965
Abolished on November 1, 1965 by 79 Stat. 951

Seat 1
Seat reassigned from the District of South Carolina on January 1, 1912 by 36 Stat. 1087 (concurrent with Western District)
Seat reassigned solely to the Eastern District on March 3, 1915 by 38 Stat. 961
Smith	1912–1923
Cochran	1923–1934
Myers	1934–1940
Waring	1942–1952
Williams	1952–1962
Simons	1962–1965
Seat reassigned to the District of South Carolina on November 1, 1965 by 79 Stat. 951

Seat 2
Seat established on February 26, 1929 by 45 Stat. 1319 (concurrent with Western District)
Glenn	1929–1938
Lumpkin	1939–1941
Timmerman	1942–1962
Hemphill	1964–1965
Seat reassigned to the District of South Carolina on November 1, 1965 by 79 Stat. 951

Seat 3
Seat established on May 19, 1961 by 75 Stat. 80 (concurrent with Western District)
Martin	1961–1965
Seat reassigned to the District of South Carolina on November 1, 1965 by 79 Stat. 951

Judges of the Western District of South Carolina:

#	Judge	Born–died	Active service	Chief Judge	Senior status	Appointed by	Reason for termination
1	Henry Smith	1853–1923	1912–1915	—	—	Taft/Operation of law	reassignment
2	Joseph T. Johnson	1858–1919	1915–1919	—	—	Wilson	death
3	Henry Hitt Watkins	1866–1947	1919–1936	—	1936–1947	Wilson	death
4	John Lyles Glenn Jr.	1892–1938	1929–1938	—	—	Hoover	death
4	Charles Cecil Wyche	1885–1966	1937–1965	1948–1962	—	F. Roosevelt	reassignment
5	Alva M. Lumpkin	1886–1941	1939–1941	—	—	F. Roosevelt	death
6	George Timmerman Sr.	1881–1966	1942–1962	—	1962–1965	F. Roosevelt	reassignment
7	James Robert Martin Jr.	1909–1984	1961–1965	1962–1965	—	Kennedy	reassignment
8	Robert W. Hemphill	1915–1984	1964–1965	—	—	L. Johnson	reassignment

Chief Judge
Wyche	1948–1962
Martin	1962–1965
Abolished on November 1, 1965 by 79 Stat. 951

Seat 1
Seat reassigned from the District of South Carolina on January 1, 1912 by 36 Stat. 1087 (concurrent with Eastern District)
Smith	1912–1915
Seat reassigned solely to the Eastern District on March 3, 1915 by 38 Stat. 961

Seat 2
Seat established on March 3, 1915 by 38 Stat. 961
Johnson	1915–1919
Watkins	1919–1936
Wyche	1937–1965
Seat reassigned to the District of South Carolina on November 1, 1965 by 79 Stat. 951

Seat 3
Seat established on February 26, 1929 by 45 Stat. 1319 (concurrent with Eastern District)
Glenn	1929–1938
Lumpkin	1939–1941
Timmerman	1942–1962
Hemphill	1964–1965
Seat reassigned to the District of South Carolina on November 1, 1965 by 79 Stat. 951

Seat 4
Seat established on May 19, 1961 by 75 Stat. 80 (concurrent with Eastern District)
Martin	1961–1965
Seat reassigned to the District of South Carolina on November 1, 1965 by 79 Stat. 951

== Tennessee ==
The United States District Court for the District of Tennessee was established with one judgeship on January 31, 1797, by 1 Stat. 496. The judgeship was filled by President George Washington's appointment of John McNairy. Since Congress failed to assign the district to a circuit, the court had the jurisdiction of both a district court and a circuit court. Appeals from this one district court went directly to the United States Supreme Court.

On February 13, 1801, in the famous "Midnight Judges" Act of 1801, 2 Stat. 89, Congress abolished the U.S. district court in Tennessee, and expanded the number of circuits to six, provided for independent circuit court judgeships, and abolished the necessity of Supreme Court Justices riding the circuits. It was this legislation which created the grandfather of the present Sixth Circuit. The act provided for a "Sixth Circuit" comprising two districts in the State of Tennessee, one district in the State of Kentucky and one district, called the Ohio District, composed of the Ohio and Indiana territories (the latter including the present State of Michigan). The new Sixth Circuit Court was to be held at "Bairdstown" in the District of Kentucky, at Knoxville in the District of East Tennessee, at Nashville in the District of West Tennessee, and at Cincinnati in the District of Ohio. Unlike the other circuits which were provided with three circuit judges, the Sixth Circuit was to have only one circuit judge with district judges from Kentucky and Tennessee comprising the rest of the court. Any two judges constituted a quorum. New circuit judgeships were to be created as district judgeships in Kentucky and Tennessee became vacant.

The repeal of this Act restored the District on March 8, 1802, 2 Stat. 132. The District was divided into the Eastern and Western Districts on April 29, 1802. On February 24, 1807, Congress again abolished the two districts and created the United States Circuit for the District of Tennessee. On March 3, 1837, Congress assigned the judicial district of Tennessee to the Eighth Circuit. On June 18, 1839, by 5 Stat. 313, Congress divided Tennessee into three districts, Eastern, Middle, and Western. Again, only one judgeship was allotted for all three districts. On July 15, 1862, Congress reassigned appellate jurisdiction to the Sixth Circuit. Finally, on June 14, 1878, Congress authorized a separate judgeship for each district of Tennessee.

#	Judge	Born–died	Active service	Chief Judge	Senior status	Appointed by	Reason for termination
1	John McNairy	1762–1837	1797–1802	—	—	Washington	reassignment

Seat 1
Seat established on January 31, 1797 by 1 Stat. 496
McNairy	1797–1802
Seat reassigned to Eastern and Western Districts on April 29, 1802 by 2 Stat.165

== Texas ==
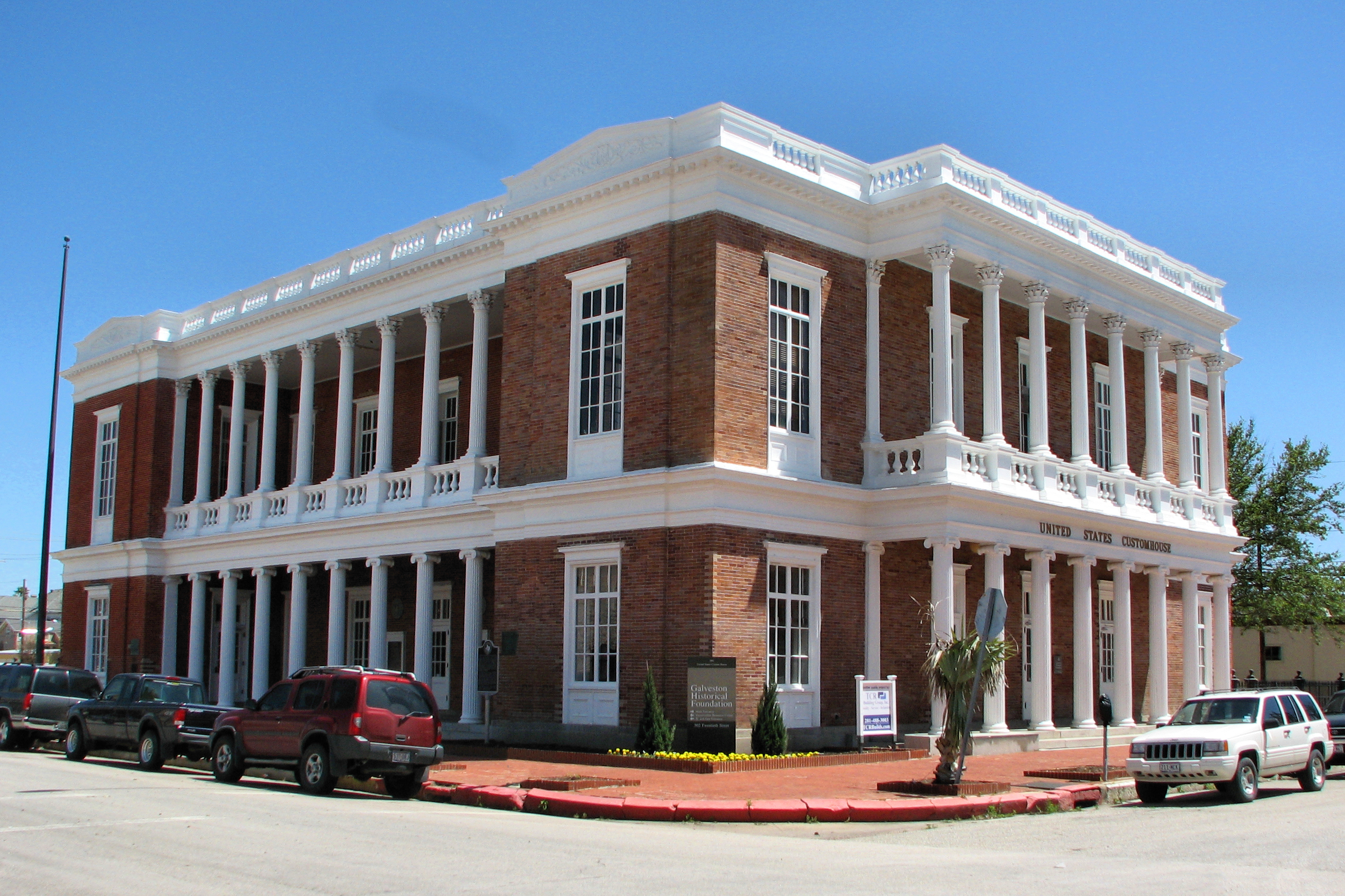
The oldest federal civil building in Texas, the 1861 Customs and Courthouse in Galveston, once housed the Southern District of Texas.

The United States District Court for the District of Texas was established on December 29, 1845, by 9 Stat. 1. and based in Galveston, then the largest city in the state. John Charles Watrous, appointed to the court by President James K. Polk in May 1846, was the only federal judge to sit for the district. The District was subdivided into Eastern and Western Districts on February 21, 1857, by 11 Stat. 164. When the District was subdivided, Watrous continued as judge for the Eastern District only, while Thomas Howard DuVal was appointed to the Western District. Watrous continued serving in the Eastern District until 1870. From these Districts, Texas was further subdivided with the creation of a Northern District on February 24, 1879, by 20 Stat. 318. The new Southern District was created on March 11, 1902, by 32 Stat. 64.

#	Judge	Born–died	Active service	Chief Judge	Senior status	Appointed by	Reason for termination
1	John Charles Watrous	1801–1874	1846–1857	—	—	Polk	reassignment

Seat 1
Seat established on December 29, 1845 by 9 Stat. 1
Watrous	1846–1857
Seat reassigned to Eastern District on February 21, 1857 by 11 Stat. 164

== Virginia ==
The United States District Court for the District of Virginia was one of the original 13 courts established by the Judiciary Act of 1789, 1 Stat. 73, on September 24, 1789.

On February 13, 1801, the Judiciary Act of 1801, 2 Stat. 89, divided Virginia into three judicial districts: the District of Virginia, which included the counties west of the Tidewater and south of the Rappahannock River; the District of Norfolk, which included the Tidewater counties south of the Rappahannock; and the District of Potomac, which included the counties north and east of the Rappahannock as well as Maryland counties along the Potomac. Just over a year later, on March 8, 1802, the Judiciary Act of 1801 was repealed and Virginia became a single District again, 2 Stat. 132, effective July 1, 1802.

The District of Virginia was subdivided into Eastern and Western Districts on February 4, 1819, by 3 Stat. 478. At that time, West Virginia was still part of Virginia, and was encompassed in Virginia's Western District. With the division of West Virginia from Virginia during the American Civil War, the Western District of Virginia became the District of West Virginia, and those parts of the Western District that were not part of West Virginia were combined with the Eastern District to again form a single District of Virginia on June 11, 1864, by 13 Stat. 124. Congress again divided Virginia into Eastern and the Western Districts on February 3, 1871, by 16 Stat. 403.

#	Judge	Born–died	Active service	Chief Judge	Senior status	Appointed by	Reason for termination
1	Cyrus Griffin	1748–1810	1789–1810	—	—	Washington	death
2	John Tyler Sr.	1747–1812	1811–1813	—	—	Madison	death
3	St. George Tucker	1810–1864	1813–1819	—	—	Madison	reassignment
4	John Curtiss Underwood	1809–1873	1864–1871	—	—	Lincoln/Operation of law	reassignment

Seat 1
Seat established on September 24, 1789 by 1 Stat. 73
Griffin	1789–1810
Tyler	1811–1813
Tucker	1813–1819
Seat reassigned to Eastern District on February 4, 1819 by 3 Stat. 478
Seat reassigned from Eastern District on June 11, 1864 by 13 Stat. 124
Underwood	1864–1871
Seat reassigned to Eastern District on February 3, 1871 by 16 Stat. 403

== Washington ==
The United States District Court for the District of Washington was established on April 5, 1890, by 26 Stat. 45. The District was subdivided into Eastern and Western Districts on March 2, 1905, by 33 Stat. 824. Only one judge was ever appointed to the District of Washington.

#	Judge	Born–died	Active service	Chief Judge	Senior status	Appointed by	Reason for termination
1	Cornelius H. Hanford	1849–1926	1890–1905	—	—	B. Harrison	reassignment

Seat 1
Seat established on April 5, 1890 by 25 Stat. 676
Hanford	1890–1905
Seat reassigned to Western District on March 2, 1905 by 33 Stat. 824

== West Virginia ==
West Virginia split from the state of Virginia during the American Civil War. At that time, Virginia was already divided into an Eastern and Western District. Congress reorganized the Western District of Virginia to conform to the boundaries of the new state of West Virginia, renaming it the United States District Court for the District of West Virginia on June 11, 1864, by 13 Stat. 124. This District was subdivided into Northern and Southern Districts on January 22, 1901, by 31 Stat. 736.

John Jay Jackson Jr., who had been appointed by Abraham Lincoln to what was then the Western District of Virginia, became the first judge of the District of West Virginia. He remained the only judge on that court until its subdivision.

#	Judge	Born–died	Active service	Chief Judge	Senior status	Appointed by	Reason for termination
1	John Jay Jackson Jr.	1824–1907	1864–1901	—	—	Lincoln/Operation of law	reassignment

Seat 1
Seat reassigned from Western District of Virginia on June 11, 1864 by 13 Stat. 124
Jackson	1864–1901
Seat reassigned to Northern District on July 1, 1901 by 31 Stat. 736

== Wisconsin ==
The United States District Court for the District of Wisconsin was established on May 29, 1848, by 9 Stat. 233. It was subdivided into Eastern and Western Districts on June 30, 1870, by 16 Stat. 171. Only one judge was ever appointed to the District of Wisconsin.

#	Judge	Born–died	Active service	Chief Judge	Senior status	Appointed by	Reason for termination
1	Andrew G. Miller	1801–1874	1848–1870	—	—	Polk	reassignment

Seat 1
Seat established on May 29, 1848 by 9 Stat. 56
Miller	1848–1870
Seat reassigned to Eastern District on June 30, 1870 by 16 Stat. 171

== See also ==
- List of courts of the United States
- List of United States district and territorial courts
- List of United States federal courthouses
- United States Court for Berlin
- United States Court for China
- United States District Court for the Canal Zone
