= Ashton Hilliard Williams =

American judge

Judge of the United States District Court for the Eastern District of South Carolina
- In office July 3, 1952 – February 25, 1962
- Appointed by: Harry S. Truman
- Preceded by: Julius Waties Waring
- Succeeded by: Charles Earl Simons Jr.

Personal details
- Born: Ashton Hilliard Williams; August 15, 1891 Lake City, South Carolina, U.S.
- Died: February 25, 1962 (aged 70)
- Party: Democratic
- Education: University of South Carolina (A.B.); Georgetown Law (LL.B.)

Ashton Hilliard Williams (August 15, 1891 – February 25, 1962) was a United States district judge of the United States District Court for the Eastern District of South Carolina.

== Education and career ==
Born in Lake City, South Carolina, Williams received an Artium Baccalaureus degree from the University of South Carolina in 1912 and a Bachelor of Laws from Georgetown Law in 1915. He was in private practice in South Carolina from 1914 to 1952. He was a member of the Lake City Council from 1916 in 1917. He was a member of the South Carolina House of Representatives from 1921 to 1922, and then of the South Carolina Senate from 1923 to 1926. He served on the Democratic National Executive Committee from South Carolina from 1948 to 1949.

== Federal judicial service ==
On June 17, 1952, Williams was nominated by President Harry S. Truman to a seat on the United States District Court for the Eastern District of South Carolina vacated by Judge Julius Waties Waring. Williams was confirmed by the United States Senate on July 2, 1952, and received his commission on July 3, 1952. Williams served in that capacity until his death on February 25, 1962.

== Sources ==
Legal offices
Preceded by Julius Waties Waring	Judge of the United States District Court for the Eastern District of South Carolina; 1952–1962	Succeeded by Charles Earl Simons Jr.
