= James F. Izlar =

American politician (1832–1912)

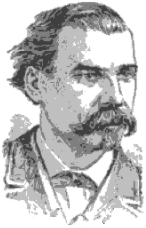

Member of the U.S. House of Representatives from South Carolina's 1st district
- In office April 12, 1894 – March 3, 1895
- Preceded by: William H. Brawley
- Succeeded by: William Elliott

President Pro Tempore of the South Carolina Senate
- In office November 25, 1884 – December 18, 1889
- Preceded by: William Wallace Harllee
- Succeeded by: Henry Adams Meetze

Member of the South Carolina Senate from Orangeburg County
- In office November 23, 1880 – December 18, 1889
- Preceded by: Samuel L. Duncan
- Succeeded by: James William Stokes

Personal details
- Born: James Ferdinand Izlar; November 25, 1832 Orangeburg, South Carolina
- Died: May 26, 1912 (aged 79) Orangeburg, South Carolina
- Resting place: Orangeburg, South Carolina
- Party: Democratic
- Education: Emory College
- Profession: lawyer, politician, judge

James Ferdinand Izlar (November 25, 1832 – May 26, 1912) was an American lawyer, Confederate veteran of the Civil War, and politician who served part of one term as a U.S. Representative from South Carolina in 1894 and early 1895. He was also a slave owner.

== Early life and education ==
Born near Orangeburg, South Carolina, Izlar attended the common schools. He graduated from Emory College in Oxford, Georgia, in 1855. He studied law and was admitted to the bar in 1858.

== Civil War ==
He served as an officer in the Confederate States Army during the Civil War. After the war, he resumed the practice of law in Orangeburg.

== Political career ==
He served as member of the State senate from 1880 to 1890, and was elected by the general assembly to be judge of the first judicial circuit in 1889. He served as delegate to the Democratic National Convention in 1884.

=== Congress ===
Izlar was elected as a Democrat to the Fifty-third Congress to fill the vacancy caused by the resignation of William H. Brawley and served from April 12, 1894, to March 3, 1895. He was not a candidate for renomination in 1894.

== Later career and death ==
After leaving Congress, he again engaged in the practice of law in Orangeburg until 1907, when he retired. He died at his home in Orangeburg on May 26, 1912, and was interred in the Episcopal Cemetery.

U.S. House of Representatives
Preceded by William H. Brawley	Member of the U.S. House of Representatives from South Carolina's 1st congressional district 1894-1895	Succeeded by William Elliott
