= George Bell Timmerman Sr. =

American judge

Senior Judge of the United States District Court for the District of South Carolina
- In office October 7, 1965 – April 22, 1966

Senior Judge of the United States District Court for the Eastern District of South Carolina and United States District Court for the Western District of South Carolina
- In office October 10, 1962 – October 7, 1965

Chief Judge of the United States District Court for the Eastern District of South Carolina
- In office 1952–1962
- Preceded by: Julius Waties Waring
- Succeeded by: Robert W. Hemphill

Judge of the United States District Court for the Eastern District of South Carolina and United States District Court for the Western District of South Carolina
- In office January 23, 1942 – October 10, 1962
- Appointed by: Franklin D. Roosevelt
- Preceded by: Alva M. Lumpkin
- Succeeded by: Robert W. Hemphill

Personal details
- Born: George Bell Timmerman; March 28, 1881 Edgefield County, South Carolina, United States
- Died: April 22, 1966 (aged 85) Columbia, South Carolina, United States
- Education: University of South Carolina School of Law (LLB)

George Bell Timmerman Sr. (March 28, 1881 – April 22, 1966) was a United States district judge of the United States District Court for the Eastern District of South Carolina and the United States District Court for the Western District of South Carolina.

== Education and career ==
Born in Edgefield County, South Carolina, Timmerman received a Bachelor of Laws from the University of South Carolina School of Law in 1902, where he was also head coach of the South Carolina Gamecocks baseball team. He was in private practice in Lexington, South Carolina from 1902 to 1942, serving as a solicitor for the 5th Judicial Circuit of South Carolina from 1905 to 1908 and the 11th Judicial Circuit of South Carolina from 1908 to 1920. He was also a member of the South Carolina House of Representatives from 1923 to 1924.

== Federal judicial service ==
Timmerman was nominated by President Franklin D. Roosevelt on December 18, 1941, to a joint seat on the United States District Court for the Eastern District of South Carolina and the United States District Court for the Western District of South Carolina vacated by Judge Alva M. Lumpkin. He was confirmed by the United States Senate on January 20, 1942, and received his commission on January 23, 1942. He served as Chief Judge of the Eastern District from 1952 to 1962. He assumed senior status on October 10, 1962. He was reassigned by operation of law to the United States District Court for the District of South Carolina on October 7, 1965, pursuant to 79 Stat. 951. His service terminated on April 22, 1966, due to his death in Columbia, South Carolina.

== Family ==
Timmerman's son, George Bell Timmerman Jr., became Governor of South Carolina and a state circuit judge in South Carolina.

== Sources ==
Legal offices
Preceded by Alva M. Lumpkin	Judge of the United States District Court for the Eastern District of South Carolina; Judge of the United States District Court for the Western District of South Carolina; 1942–1962	Succeeded by Robert W. Hemphill
Preceded by Julius Waties Waring	Chief Judge of the United States District Court for the Eastern District of South Carolina; 1952–1962	Succeeded by Robert W. Hemphill
