= Julius Waties Waring =

United States federal judge (1880–1968)

Senior Judge of the United States District Court for the District of South Carolina
- In office October 7, 1965 – January 11, 1968

Senior Judge of the United States District Court for the Eastern District of South Carolina
- In office February 15, 1952 – October 7, 1965

Chief Judge of the United States District Court for the Eastern District of South Carolina
- In office 1948–1952
- Preceded by: Office established
- Succeeded by: George Timmerman

Judge of the United States District Court for the Eastern District of South Carolina
- In office January 23, 1942 – February 15, 1952
- Appointed by: Franklin D. Roosevelt
- Preceded by: Francis Kerschner Myers
- Succeeded by: Ashton Hilliard Williams

Personal details
- Born: July 27, 1880 Charleston, South Carolina, US
- Died: January 11, 1968 (aged 87) New York City, US
- Resting place: Magnolia Cemetery; Charleston, South Carolina
- Relations: Waring Family
- Education: College of Charleston (A.B.) read law

Julius Waties Waring (July 27, 1880 – January 11, 1968) was a United States district judge of the United States District Court for the Eastern District of South Carolina who played an important role in the early legal battles of the American Civil Rights Movement. His dissent in Briggs v. Elliott was foundational to Brown v. Board of Education.

== Biography ==
=== Early life and education ===
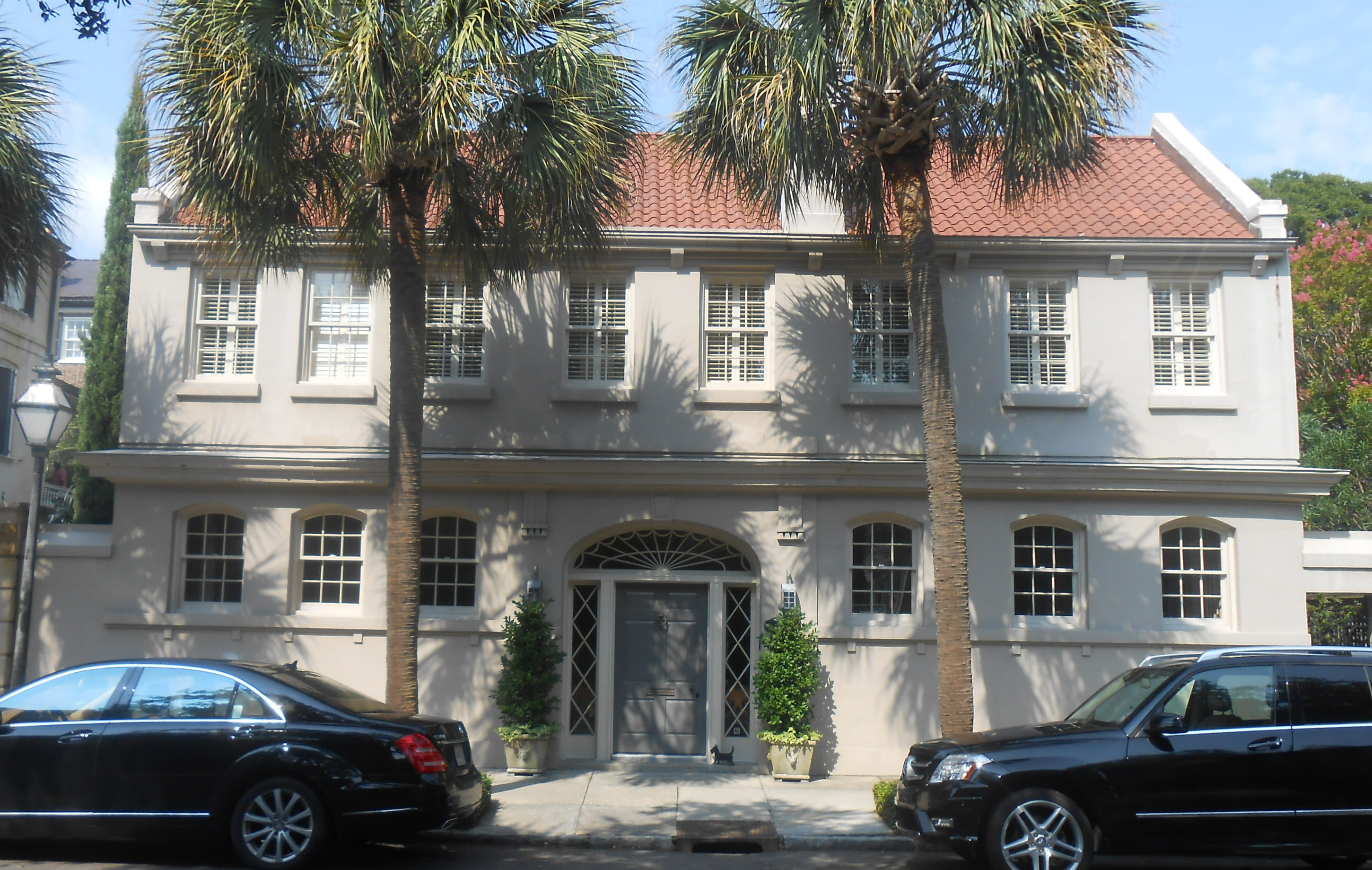
Judge Waring lived at 61 Meeting Street from 1915 until being driven out of Charleston.

Waring was born in Charleston, South Carolina, to Edward Perry Waring and Anna Thomasine Waties. He graduated second in his class with an Artium Baccalaureus degree from the College of Charleston in 1900. Waring read law in 1901 and passed the South Carolina bar exam in 1902. He married his first wife, Annie Gammel, in 1913. Their only daughter was Anne Waring Warren, who died without children. The couple moved into a house at 61 Meeting St. in 1915.

=== Career ===
He was in private practice of law in Charleston from 1902 to 1942 and an Assistant United States Attorney in the Eastern District of South Carolina from 1914 to 1921. He served as the city attorney for Charleston from 1933 to 1942, under Mayor Burnet R. Maybank. In 1938, he served as the campaign manager for Democratic Senator Ellison D. "Cotton Ed" Smith. Waring founded a law firm with D. A. Brockington.

==== Federal judicial service ====
Waring was nominated by President Franklin D. Roosevelt on December 18, 1941, to a seat on the United States District Court for the Eastern District of South Carolina vacated by Judge Francis Kerschner Myers. He was confirmed by the United States Senate on January 20, 1942, and received his commission on January 23, 1942. He served as Chief Judge from 1948 to 1952. As Chief Judge, Waring ended segregated seating in the courtroom and chose a black bailiff, John Fleming, who quickly became known as "John the Bailiff."

==== Judicial philosophy and move to New York ====
Waring had been initially supported by the establishment of Charleston. After divorcing his first wife and marrying the Northern socialite Elizabeth Avery, Judge Waring quickly transitioned from a racial moderate to a proponent of radical change. Speaking at a Harlem church, he proclaimed: "The cancer of segregation will never be cured by the sedative of gradualism." Political, editorial, and social leaders in South Carolina criticized and shunned Judge Waring and his wife to the point where, in 1952, when he assumed senior status, they left Charleston altogether and moved to New York City.

==== Isaac Woodard case ====
In 1946, Chief of Police Linwood Shull of Batesburg, South Carolina, and several other officers beat and blinded Isaac Woodard, a black man on his way home after serving over three years in the army. After it became clear that the state authorities of South Carolina would take no action against Shull, President Harry S. Truman himself initiated a case, brought to the federal level on the grounds that the beating had occurred at a bus stop on federal property, and that at the time of the assault, Woodard was in uniform.

The case was presided over by Waring, but by all accounts the trial was a travesty. The local United States Attorney charged with handling the case failed to interview anyone except the bus driver, a decision that Waring believed was a gross dereliction of duty. The defense attorney's behavior was also contrary, at one point telling the jury that "if you rule against Shull, then let this South Carolina secede again", and he later shouted racial epithets at Woodard. The jury found Shull not guilty on all charges.

The failure to convict Shull was perceived as a political failure on the part of the Truman administration, and Waring would later write of his disgust of the way the case was handled, commenting "I was shocked by the hypocrisy of my government...in submitting that disgraceful case..."

==== Further race-based cases ====
In several other cases he ruled in favor of those who had challenged racist practices of the time:

- In Duvall v. School Board, he ruled that equal pay must be guaranteed for otherwise equally qualified school teachers, regardless of their race. That ruling was made from the bench, so there is no written opinion. However, Judge Waring referred to his earlier decision when he decided a related case in 1947, Thompson v. Gibbes, 60 F. Supp. 872 (E.D.S.C. 1947).
- In his 1946 ruling he held that "a Negro resident of South Carolina was entitled to the same opportunity and facilities afforded to white residents for obtaining a legal education by and in the state" and gave the state of South Carolina three options: that the University of South Carolina admit the plaintiff John H. Wrighten, that the state open a black law school or that the white law school at USC be closed. His ruling was not novel, but merely in accordance with the United States Supreme Court's 1938 decision in Missouri ex rel. Gaines v. Canada. Rather than integrate the University of South Carolina or close it down, the South Carolina General Assembly authorized the establishment of a law school at South Carolina State - South Carolina State University School of Law.
- Judge Waring opened the all-white Democratic Primary in South Carolina to African Americans with his rulings in Elmore v. Rice and Brown v. Baskin.

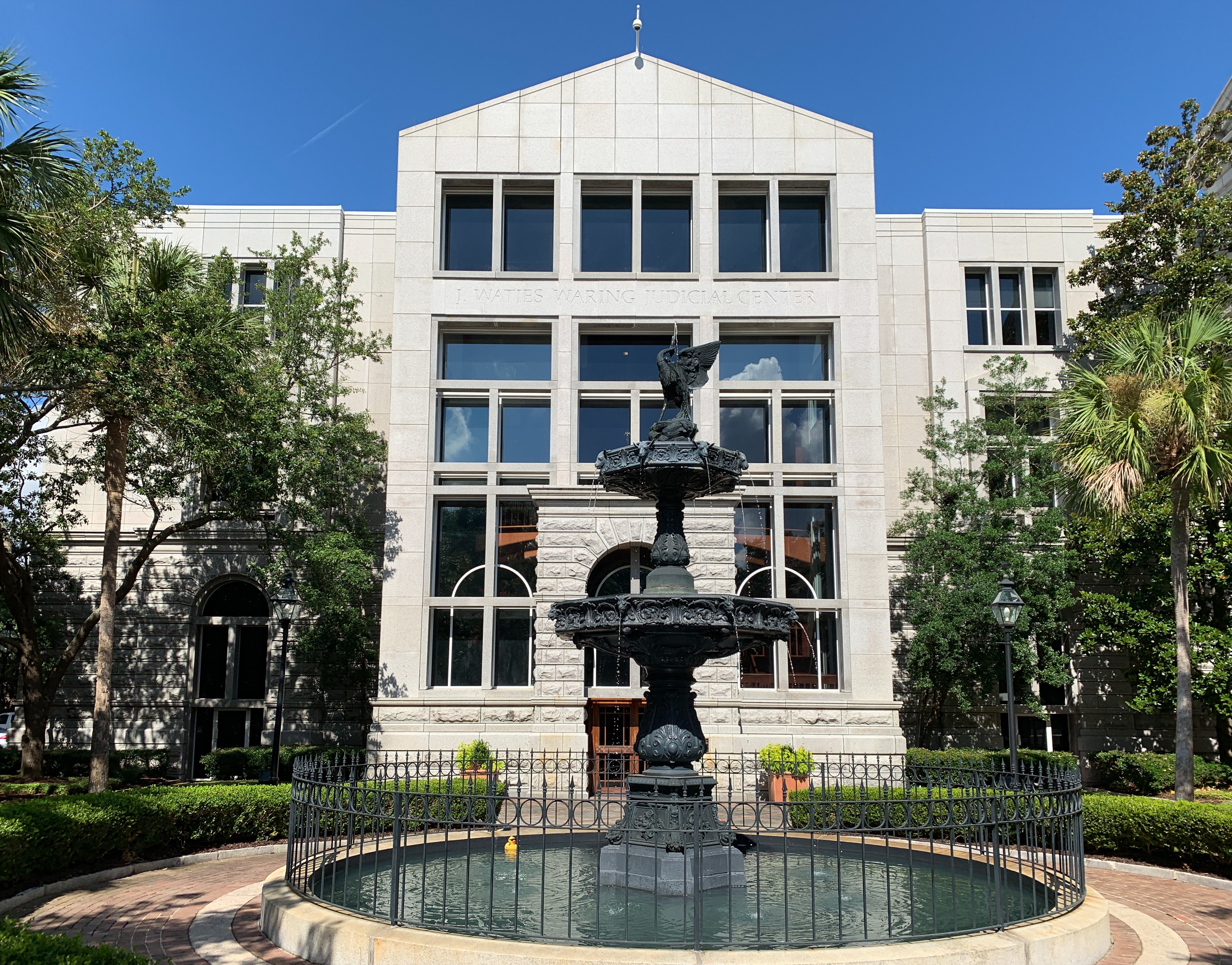
The J. Waties Waring Judicial Center

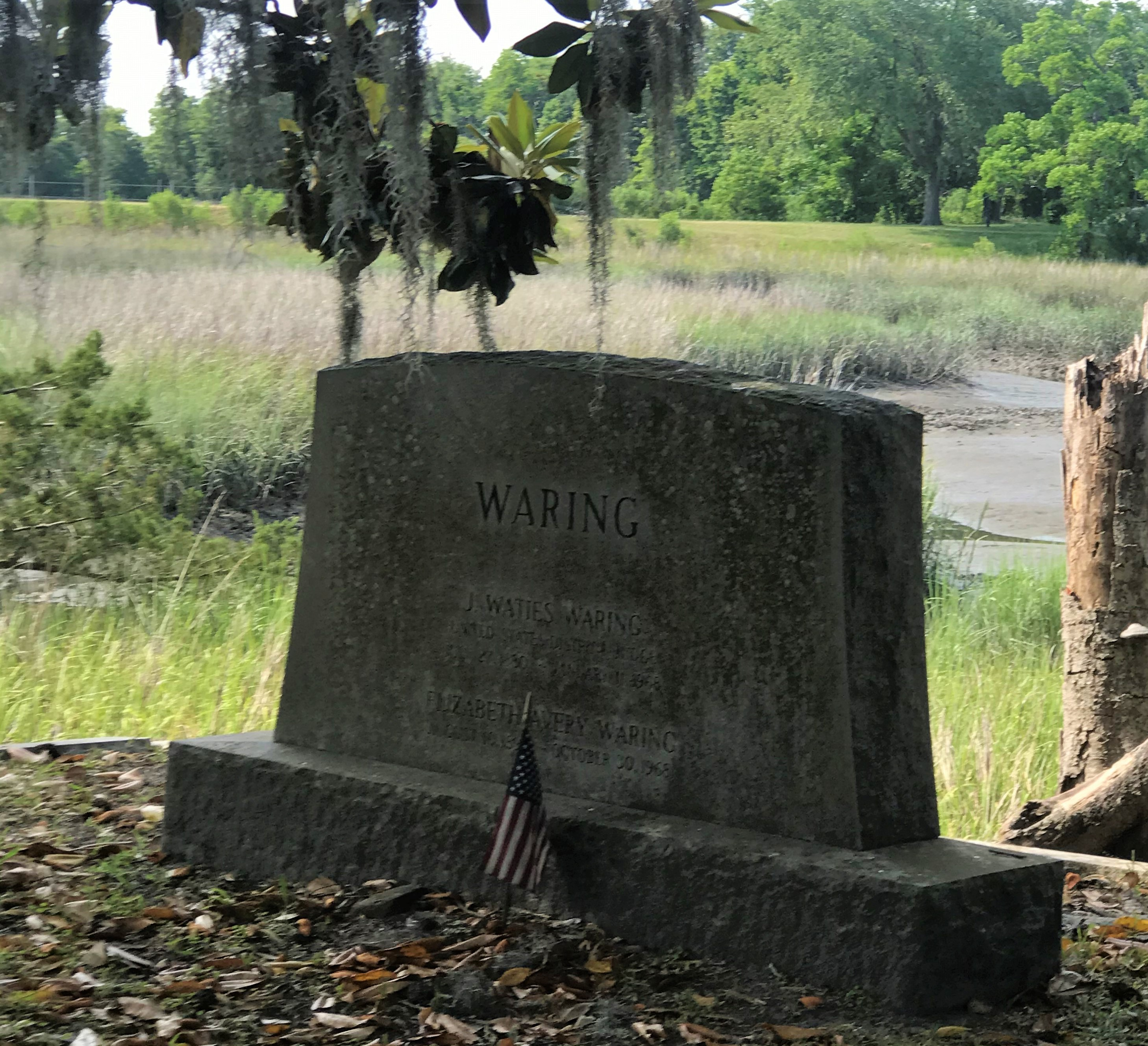
Waring's gravestone at Magnolia Cemetery.

==== Briggs v. Elliott ====
In 1951 Waring was one of three judges to hear Briggs v. Elliott, a test case on school desegregation. Thurgood Marshall represented the plaintiffs against the Clarendon County, South Carolina public schools which were described as separate but not at all equal. Though the plaintiffs lost the case before the three judge panel which voted 2–1 for the defendants, Waring's eloquent dissent, and his phrase, "Segregation is per se inequality" formed the legal foundation for the United States Supreme Court in the 1954 Brown v. Board of Education decision.

=== Later life and death ===
Waring assumed senior status on February 15, 1952. He was reassigned by operation of law to the United States District Court for the District of South Carolina on October 7, 1965, pursuant to 79 Stat. 951.

Waring died on 11 January 1968 in New York City. His memorial service held in Charleston was conducted by the Charleston branch of the NAACP. Approximately two-hundred African Americans and less than a dozen white persons attended his burial in Magnolia Cemetery. He was buried in the Waring family plot at Magnolia Cemetery in Charleston.

== Legacy ==
Charlestonian high society ostracized Waring for his judicial opinions. Rocks were thrown through his windows and the Ku Klux Klan set a cross alight in front of his home. After his retirement, Waring slid into obscurity until his legacy was "reclaimed" in the 2010s.

In October 2015, the Hollings Judicial Center in Charleston was renamed the J. Waties Waring Judicial Center.

In 2019, Judge Richard Gergel wrote a book about the impact of the Isaac Woodard case on Waring and President Harry Truman. Waring was portrayed by Rich Fulcher in the second season of Comedy Central's Drunk History.

In 2021, the PBS series, American Experience, (season 33) first aired "The Blinding of Isaac Woodard" which focused on Judge Waring's role in that case.

== Sources ==
- Great Love Affairs in History.
- Payne, Charles M. 1997. I've Got the Light of Freedom, Berkeley: University of California Press.
- University of South Carolina School of Law.
- Yarbrough, Tinsley, 2001. A passion for justice: J. Waties Waring and civil rights, New York: Oxford University Press US.

Legal offices
Preceded by Francis Kerschner Myers	Judge of the United States District Court for the Eastern District of South Carolina; 1942–1952	Succeeded by Ashton Hilliard Williams
Preceded by Office established	Chief Judge of the United States District Court for the Eastern District of South Carolina; 1948–1952	Succeeded by George Bell Timmerman Sr.
