= Ernest Ford Cochran =

American judge

Judge of the United States District Court for the Eastern District of South Carolina
- In office November 22, 1923 – March 4, 1934
- Appointed by: Calvin Coolidge
- Preceded by: Henry Augustus Middleton Smith
- Succeeded by: Francis Kerschner Myers

Personal details
- Born: Ernest Ford Cochran; September 12, 1865 Anderson, South Carolina
- Died: March 4, 1934 (aged 68) Charleston, South Carolina
- Education: University of Virginia School of Law (LL.B.)

Ernest Ford Cochran (September 12, 1865 – March 4, 1934) was a United States district judge of the United States District Court for the Eastern District of South Carolina.

== Education and career ==
Born in Anderson, South Carolina, Cochran received a Bachelor of Laws from the University of Virginia School of Law in 1888. He was in private practice in Anderson for various periods from 1889 to 1923, and was also a United States Commissioner for the United States District Court for the District of South Carolina from 1889 to 1891. He was an Assistant United States Attorney of the District of South Carolina from 1891 to 1892 and from 1898 to 1905, also serving as Anderson's city attorney from 1898 to 1900, and was the United States Attorney for the District of South Carolina from 1906 to 1914, and for the Western District of South Carolina from 1921 to 1923.

== Federal judicial service ==
Cochran received a recess appointment from President Calvin Coolidge on November 22, 1923, to a seat on the United States District Court for the Eastern District of South Carolina vacated by Judge Henry Augustus Middleton Smith. He was nominated to the same position by President Coolidge on December 15, 1923. He was confirmed by the United States Senate on January 17, 1924, and received his commission on January 21, 1924. His service terminated on March 4, 1934, due to his death in Charleston, South Carolina.

== Sources ==
Legal offices
Preceded by Henry Augustus Middleton Smith	Judge of the United States District Court for the Eastern District of South Carolina; 1923–1934	Succeeded by Francis Kerschner Myers
