= Edward Frost =

American politician and jurist (1801–1868)

Personal details
- Born: April 27, 1801 Charleston, South Carolina, U.S.
- Died: July 21, 1868 (aged 67) Charleston, South Carolina, U.S.
- Resting place: Magnolia Cemetery
- Spouse: Harriet Vander Horst Horry (m. 1826)
- Children: 11
- Education: Yale College
- Occupation: Politician; lawyer; judge

Edward Frost (April 27, 1801 – July 21, 1868) was an American politician and jurist from South Carolina.

== Early life ==
Edward Frost was born on April 27, 1801, in Charleston, South Carolina, to Elizabeth (née Downes) and Thomas Frost. His father was rector of St. Philip's Church in Charleston and a graduate of Cambridge University of England. He graduated from Yale College in 1820. He read law and was admitted to the bar in Charleston in 1823.

== Career ==
Frost began practicing law in Charleston. In 1832, he served as a U.S. district attorney, but resigned due to having to defend the tariff laws of the time.

Frost served several terms in the South Carolina General Assembly. In 1843, he was elected by the legislature as judge of the Court of Common Pleas. He resigned after 10 years.

Following his judgeship, Frost became president of the Blue Ridge Railroad. He supported the secession of South Carolina during the Civil War. He was a member of the convention for the 1865 South Carolina Constitution. He was a member of the board of directors of the College of Charleston. He was a member of the board of school commissioners and served as chairman of the board from 1832 to 1834.

== Personal life ==
Frost married Harriet Vander Horst Horry, daughter of Elias Horry, on October 19, 1826. They had 11 children, including Henry William. During the Civil War, he lived in Pendleton and then moved back to Charleston.

Frost died on July 21, 1868, in Charleston. He was buried in Magnolia Cemetery.

== Legacy ==
Frost donated US$10,000 for the founding of the chair of moral and political philosophy at the College of Charleston.
