= Charles Earl Simons Jr. =

American judge

Senior Judge of the United States District Court for the District of South Carolina
- In office August 17, 1986 – October 26, 1999

Chief Judge of the United States District Court for the District of South Carolina
- In office 1980–1986
- Preceded by: Robert W. Hemphill
- Succeeded by: Solomon Blatt Jr.

Judge of the United States District Court for the District of South Carolina
- In office November 1, 1965 – August 17, 1986
- Appointed by: operation of law
- Preceded by: Seat established by 79 Stat. 951
- Succeeded by: Joseph F. Anderson

Judge of the United States District Court for the Eastern District of South Carolina
- In office May 1, 1964 – November 1, 1965
- Appointed by: Lyndon B. Johnson
- Preceded by: Ashton Hilliard Williams
- Succeeded by: Seat abolished

Personal details
- Born: Charles Earl Simons Jr. August 17, 1916 Johnston, South Carolina, U.S.
- Died: October 26, 1999 (aged 83) Aiken, South Carolina, U.S.
- Education: University of South Carolina (A.B.); University of South Carolina School of Law (LL.B .)

Charles Earl Simons Jr. (August 17, 1916 – October 26, 1999) was a United States district judge of the United States District Court for the District of South Carolina.

== Education and career ==
Born in Johnston, South Carolina, Simons received an Artium Baccalaureus degree from the University of South Carolina in 1937 and a Bachelor of Laws from the University of South Carolina School of Law in 1939. He was in private practice in Aiken, South Carolina from 1939 to 1964. He was a United States Naval Reserve Lieutenant during World War II, from 1942 to 1945. He was a member of the South Carolina House of Representatives in 1942 and from 1947 to 1948 and from 1960 to 1964.

== Federal judicial service ==
On April 15, 1964, Simons was nominated by President Lyndon B. Johnson to a seat on the United States District Court for the Eastern District of South Carolina vacated by Judge Ashton Hilliard Williams. Johnson was confirmed by the United States Senate on April 30, 1964, and received his commission on May 1, 1964. On November 1, 1965, he was reassigned by operation of law to the United States District Court for the District of South Carolina, to a new seat established by 79 Stat. 951. He served as Chief Judge from 1980 to 1986, assuming senior status on August 17, 1986, and serving in that capacity until his death on October 26, 1999, in Aiken.

== Honor ==
The Charles E. Simons Jr. Federal Court House was named for him in 1986.

== Sources ==
Legal offices
Preceded by Ashton Hilliard Williams	Judge of the United States District Court for the Eastern District of South Carolina; 1964–1965	Succeeded by Seat abolished
Preceded by Seat established by 79 Stat. 951	Judge of the United States District Court for the District of South Carolina; 1965–1986	Succeeded by Joseph F. Anderson
Preceded by Robert W. Hemphill	Chief Judge of the United States District Court for the District of South Carolina; 1980–1986	Succeeded by Solomon Blatt Jr.
