= Corey F. Ellis =

FBI official and former U.S. Attorney for South Carolina

- Born: 1968 (age 57–58)
- Education: Brown University (AB), University of Memphis School of Law (JD)
- Title: United States Attorney for the District of South Carolina

Corey Frazier Ellis (born 1968) is an American lawyer, and a former chief of staff of the Federal Bureau of Investigation and Interim United States Attorney for the District of South Carolina.

== Education ==
Ellis graduated from Elizabethton High School in Elizabethton, Tennessee before receiving his Bachelor of Arts degree from Brown University in 1990 and a Juris Doctor from the University of Memphis School of Law in 1994.

== Career ==
Upon graduation from law school, Ellis worked in private practice for three years before becoming an assistant district attorney in Hendersonville, North Carolina. He joined the United States Attorney's Office for the Western District of North Carolina in 2005 and prosecuted white collar fraud including the ZeekRewards scam, and Buncombe County Sheriff, Bobby Medford. In 2017, Attorney General Jeff Sessions created a position within the Department of Justice to police asset forfeiture. In 2018, Ellis was appointed Director of Asset Forfeiture Accountability in the United States Department of Justice's Deputy Attorney General's Office. Deputy Attorney General Rod Rosenstein named him as chief of staff before Attorney General Bill Barr selected him to serve as acting director of the Executive Office for United States Attorneys.

From January 2021 to January 2022, he served as chief of staff to the Director of the Federal Bureau of Investigation, Christopher A. Wray.

In December 2021, Attorney General Merrick Garland appointed Ellis interim United States Attorney for the District of South Carolina. He was later appointed by Chief District Court Judge Bryan Harwell to be Interim United States Attorney. His term as Interim U.S. Attorney ended on July 25, 2022, when the presidentially appointed U.S. Attorney Adair Ford Boroughs was sworn in following Senate confirmation. He then returned to his original office in the Western District of North Carolina as an Assistant U.S. Attorney.
