= Gergel =

Gergel is a surname. Notable people with the surname include:

- Max Gergel, American chemist
- Nahum Gergel (1887–1931), Ukrainian humanitarian and sociologist
- Richard Mark Gergel (born 1954), American lawyer and judge
- Roman Gergel (born 1988), Slovak football midfielder
