= Solomon Blatt =

Solomon Blatt may refer to:

- Solomon Blatt Sr. (1895–1986), Speaker of the South Carolina House of Representatives
- Solomon Blatt Jr. (1921–2016), United States federal judge in South Carolina
