= Cameron McGowan Currie =

American judge (born 1948)

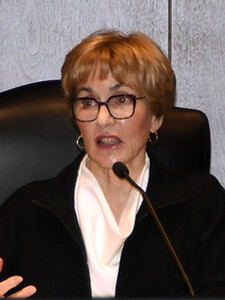
- Undated photo of Currie

Senior Judge of the United States District Court for the District of South Carolina
- Incumbent
- Assumed office October 3, 2013

Judge of the United States District Court for the District of South Carolina
- In office March 11, 1994 – October 3, 2013
- Appointed by: Bill Clinton
- Preceded by: Falcon Black Hawkins Jr.
- Succeeded by: A. Marvin Quattlebaum Jr.

Magistrate Judge of the United States District Court for the District of South Carolina
- In office 1984–1986

Personal details
- Born: October 3, 1948 (age 77) Florence, South Carolina
- Education: University of South Carolina (BA); George Washington University (JD)

Cameron McGowan Currie (born October 3, 1948) is a senior United States district judge of the United States District Court for the District of South Carolina.

== Education and career ==
Born in Florence, South Carolina, Currie received a Bachelor of Arts degree from the University of South Carolina in 1970 and a Juris Doctor from George Washington University Law School in 1975. She was a law clerk to United States Magistrate Arthur L. Burnett of the District of Columbia from 1973 to 1974. She was in private practice in Washington, D.C., from 1975 to 1978. She was an Assistant United States Attorney for the District of Columbia from 1978 to 1980, and for the District of South Carolina from 1980 to 1984.

Currie was a United States Magistrate for the District of South Carolina from 1984 to 1986, returning to private practice in Columbia, South Carolina from 1986 to 1989. She was also an adjunct professor of law, University of South Carolina Law Center from 1986 to 1989. She was a chief deputy state attorney general of Office of the State Attorney General, South Carolina from 1989 to 1994.

== Federal judicial service ==
On January 27, 1994, Currie was nominated by President Bill Clinton to a seat on the United States District Court for the District of South Carolina vacated by Falcon Black Hawkins Jr. Currie was confirmed by the United States Senate on March 10, 1994, and received her commission on March 11, 1994. She took senior status on October 3, 2013.

On November 24, 2025, Currie found that Trump-appointed interim U.S. Attorney Lindsey Halligan had been unlawfully appointed as the interim U.S. Attorney for the Eastern District of Virginia, which led to not only Halligan being disqualified from this position, but also two criminal cases, one against former FBI director James Comey and one against New York Attorney General Letitia James, being dismissed, with Currie finding that Halligan's appointment was tied to prosecuting these two people who undertook legal investigations against Trump.

Legal offices
| Preceded by Falcon Black Hawkins Jr. | Judge of the United States District Court for the District of South Carolina; 1994–2013 | Succeeded by A. Marvin Quattlebaum Jr. |
