= Joseph Dawson III =

American judge (born 1970)

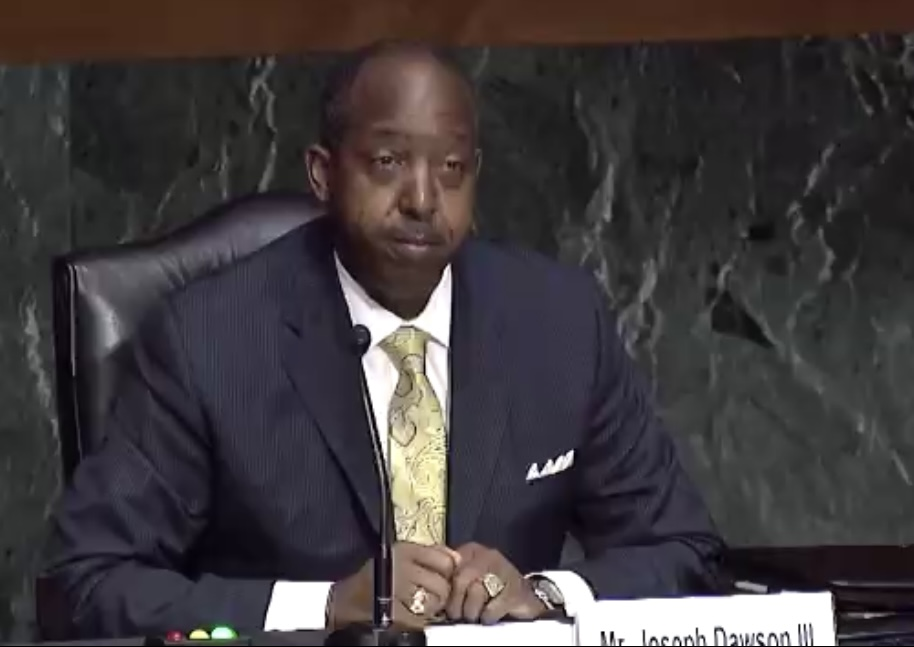

Judge of the United States District Court for the District of South Carolina
- Incumbent
- Assumed office December 22, 2020
- Appointed by: Donald Trump
- Preceded by: Terry L. Wooten

Personal details
- Born: 1970 (age 54–55) Fort Jackson, South Carolina, U.S.
- Education: The Citadel (BA); University of South Carolina (JD)

Military service
- Allegiance: United States
- Branch/service: United States Army; South Carolina Army National Guard (1999–2009); United States Army Reserve (2009)
- Rank: Captain
- Unit: United States Army Judge Advocate General's Corps
- Awards: See list: Army Reserve Components Achievement Medal Army Service Ribbon South Carolina Palmetto Service Ribbon

Joseph Dawson III (born 1970) is a United States district judge of the United States District Court for the District of South Carolina.

== Education ==
Dawson earned his Bachelor of Arts from The Citadel and his Juris Doctor from the University of South Carolina School of Law.

== Military Service and legal career ==
From 1999 to 2009, Dawson was a judge advocate general for the South Carolina Army National Guard, and he was a judge advocate general in the U.S. Army Reserve in 2009. He earned numerous awards and ended his military service as a captain.

== Civilian legal career ==
From 2001 to 2020, Dawson operated his own law practice and focused on general civil litigation and providing strategic advice to small businesses. He also served as County Attorney for Charleston County, South Carolina, where he was responsible for managing and overseeing all legal matters for the county and its officials.

== Federal judicial service ==
On October 1, 2020, President Donald Trump announced his intent to nominate Dawson to the United States District Court for the District of South Carolina seat vacated by Judge Terry L. Wooten, who assumed senior status on February 28, 2019. Dawson was recommended by Senator Tim Scott. On October 23, 2020, his nomination was sent to the Senate. On November 18, 2020, a hearing on his nomination was held before the Senate Judiciary Committee. On December 10, 2020, his nomination was reported out of committee by a 13–9 vote. On December 16, 2020, the United States Senate invoked cloture on his nomination by a 56–39 vote. His nomination was confirmed later that day by a 56–39 vote. He received his judicial commission on December 22, 2020.

In 2022, a judicial reform organization filed a formal complaint against Dawson over his ongoing $216,000 contract with the Charleston County government shortly after his confirmation to the United States District Court for the District of South Carolina. Charleston County amended Dawson’s controversial exit contract, and now the federal judge will not receive any cut of the county’s potential payout from the national opioid pharmaceutical litigation. Dawson also had asked the county to clarify that he won't be providing any legal services to the county in return for the $216,000 the county paid him, Council Chairman Teddie Pryor said.

== See also ==
- List of African-American federal judges
- List of African-American jurists

Legal offices
Preceded by Terry L. Wooten	Judge of the United States District Court for the District of South Carolina; 2020–present	Incumbent
