= Adair Ford Boroughs =

American lawyer (born 1979 or 1980)

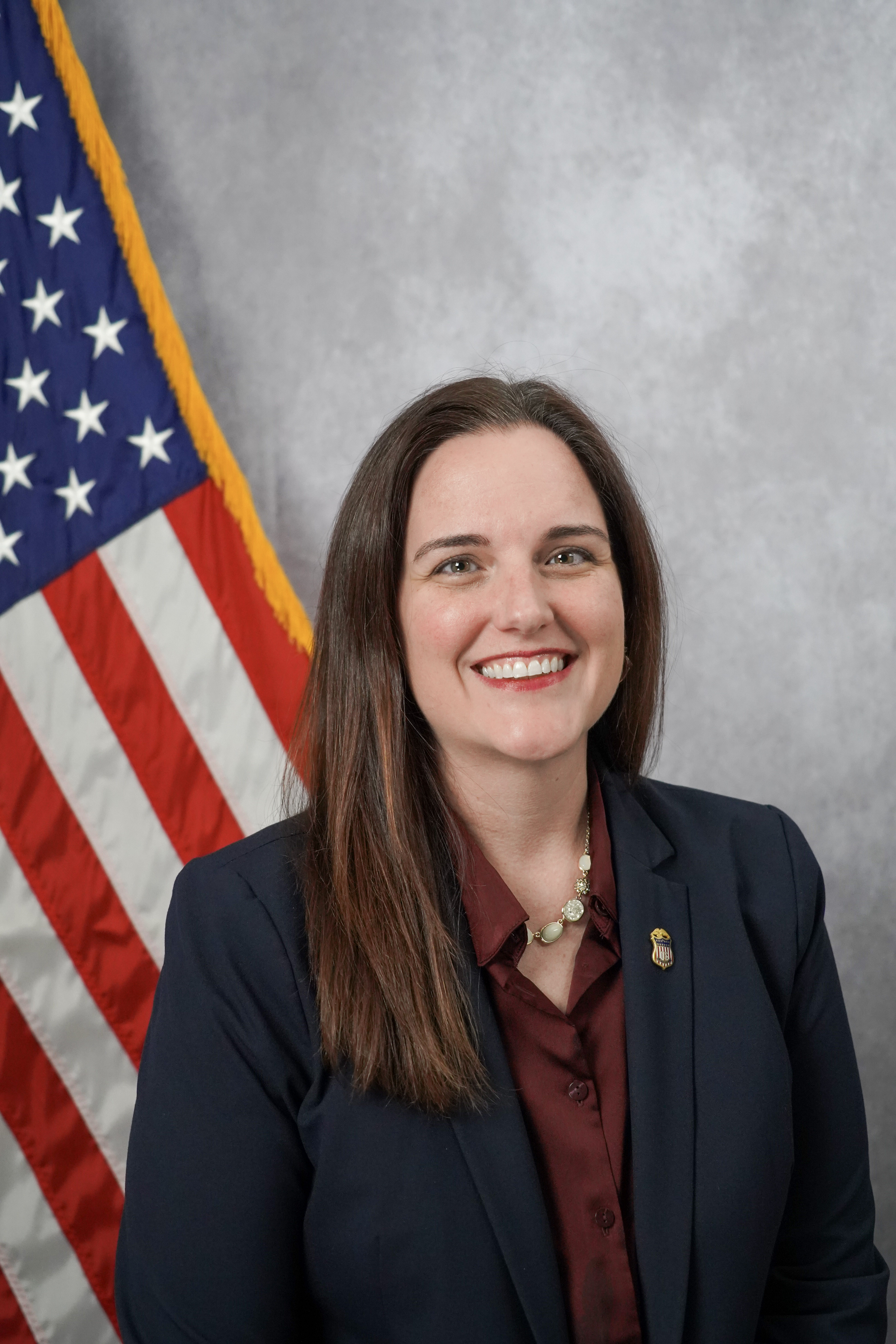
- Official portrait, 2025

United States Attorney for the District of South Carolina
- In office July 26, 2022 – February 18, 2025
- President: Joe Biden; Donald Trump
- Preceded by: Peter M. McCoy Jr.
- Succeeded by: Bryan Stirling

Personal details
- Born: 1979 or 1980 (age 46–47)
- Party: Democratic
- Education: Furman University (BS); Stanford University (JD)

Adair Ford Boroughs (born 1979 or 1980) is an American lawyer who served as the United States attorney for the District of South Carolina from 2022 to 2025.

== Education ==
Boroughs received a Bachelor of Science, summa cum laude, from Furman University in 2002 and a Juris Doctor from Stanford Law School in 2007.

== Career ==
Boroughs served as a trial attorney in the United States Department of Justice Tax Division from 2007 to 2013. She then served as a law clerk for Judge Richard Gergel of the United States District Court for the District of South Carolina from 2013 to 2017. From 2017 to 2019, she was the executive director of Charleston Legal Access. She is the founding partner of Boroughs Bryant, LLC, where she practiced from 2021 until her confirmation as U.S. attorney in 2022.

=== U.S. attorney for the District of South Carolina ===
On June 6, 2022, President Joe Biden nominated Boroughs to be the United States attorney for the District of South Carolina. On July 14, 2022, her nomination was favorably reported out of committee by voice vote; senators Josh Hawley and Marsha Blackburn were recorded as "no" votes. On July 21, 2022, her nomination was confirmed in the United States Senate by voice vote. She was sworn into office on July 26, 2022. After Donald Trump was sworn in as President, Boroughs left the office on February 18, 2025.

=== Post federal government work ===
After vacating her office as US attorney, Boroughs accepted a faculty position at the Joseph F. Rice School of Law at the University of South Carolina.

Legal offices
Preceded by Peter M. McCoy Jr.	United States Attorney for the District of South Carolina; 2022–2025	Succeeded by Bryan Stirling
