= McCrady =

McCrady is a surname. Notable people with the surname include:

- Christine McCrady, Canadian curler
- Edward McCrady (1802–1892), American politician
- John McCrady (1911–1968), American painter and printmaker
- Thurlo McCrady (1907–1999), American football, basketball, and track coach, athletics administrator and sports executive

== See also ==
- McCrady's Tavern and Long Room, tavern complex in Charleston, South Carolina
