= Donald C. Coggins Jr. =

American judge (born 1959)

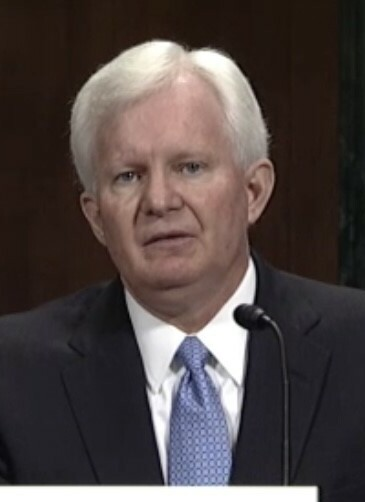

Judge of the United States District Court for the District of South Carolina
- Incumbent
- Assumed office November 20, 2017
- Appointed by: Donald Trump
- Preceded by: Joseph F. Anderson

Personal details
- Born: Donald Cecil Coggins Jr. July 17, 1959 (age 66) Spartanburg, South Carolina, U.S.
- Education: Clemson University (BA); University of South Carolina (JD)

Donald Cecil Coggins Jr. (born July 17, 1959) is a United States district judge of the United States District Court for the District of South Carolina.

== Biography ==
Coggins was born in Spartanburg, South Carolina, on July 17, 1959. He received a Bachelor of Arts degree in 1981 from Clemson University. He received a Juris Doctor in 1984 from the University of South Carolina School of Law. He began his legal career as an associate at the law firm of Cummings and Smith, where he was employed from 1984 to 1986. He became a named partner at the successor firms of Cummings, Smith and Coggins from 1986 to 1993 and Smith and Coggins from 1993 to 2000. From 2000 to 2017, he was a shareholder at the law firm of Harrison, White, Smith & Coggins, P.C. (formerly Harrison, White, Smith, Hayes & Coggins, P.C.), where his practice focused on civil litigation. From 2010 to 2013, he was the firm's managing shareholder. Coggins also served as a member of the South Carolina Commission on Lawyer Conduct, a position he held from 2003 to 2017.

== Federal judicial service ==
=== Expired nomination to district court under Obama ===
On February 25, 2016, President Obama nominated Coggins to serve as a United States District Judge of the United States District Court for the District of South Carolina, to the seat vacated by Judge Joseph F. Anderson, who assumed senior status on November 16, 2014. On June 21, 2016, a hearing before the Senate Judiciary Committee was held on his nomination. On July 14, 2016, his nomination was reported out of committee by a voice vote. His nomination expired on January 3, 2017, with the end of the 114th Congress.

=== Renomination to district court under Trump ===
On August 3, 2017, President Donald Trump renominated Coggins to the same seat. On September 14, 2017, his nomination was reported out of committee by a voice vote. On November 16, 2017, the United States Senate invoked cloture on his nomination by a 96–1 vote. His nomination was confirmed later that day by a 96–0 vote. He received his judicial commission on November 20, 2017.

== See also ==
- Barack Obama judicial appointment controversies

Legal offices
Preceded by Joseph F. Anderson	Judge of the United States District Court for the District of South Carolina; 2017–present	Incumbent
