= Sherri Lydon =

American judge (born 1962)

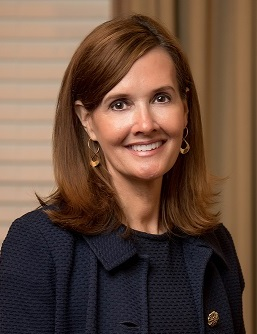

Chief Judge of the United States District Court for the District of South Carolina
- Incumbent
- Assumed office October 1, 2026
- Preceded by: Timothy M. Cain

Judge of the United States District Court for the District of South Carolina
- Incumbent
- Assumed office December 10, 2019
- Appointed by: Donald Trump
- Preceded by: A. Marvin Quattlebaum Jr.

United States Attorney for the District of South Carolina
- In office May 24, 2018 – December 10, 2019
- President: Donald Trump
- Preceded by: Bill Nettles
- Succeeded by: Peter M. McCoy Jr.

Personal details
- Born: Cheryl Allen; 1962 (age 63–64) Myrtle Beach Air Force Base, South Carolina, U.S.
- Education: Clemson University (BA); University of South Carolina (JD)

Cheryl "Sherri" Allen Lydon (née Allen; born 1962) is the chief United States district judge of the United States District Court for the District of South Carolina. She previously served as the United States attorney for the same district. She was the first woman to serve as a presidentially-appointed U.S. Attorney for the District of South Carolina.

== Education ==
Lydon earned her Bachelor of Arts from Clemson University and her Juris Doctor from the University of South Carolina School of Law.

== Career ==
Lydon began her legal career at Nexsen Pruet Jacobs and Pollard. Three years later, she became an assistant United States attorney for the District of South Carolina. As a federal prosecutor, she carried a diverse docket, including public corruption, RICO, drug, and fraud cases.

=== U.S. attorney ===
On April 10, 2018, President Donald Trump announced his intent to nominate Lydon to serve as United States attorney for the District of South Carolina. On April 12, 2018, her nomination was sent to the Senate. On May 10, 2018, her nomination was reported out of committee by a voice vote. On May 22, 2018, the Senate confirmed her nomination by voice vote. She was sworn into office on May 24, 2018. She left office on December 10, 2019, after becoming a federal judge.

Lydon was the first female U.S. attorney for the District of South Carolina to be appointed by a president.

=== Federal judicial service ===
On September 12, 2019, President Donald Trump announced his intent to nominate Lydon to serve as a United States district judge of the United States District Court for the District of South Carolina. On October 15, 2019, her nomination was sent to the Senate. President Trump nominated Lydon to the seat vacated by Judge A. Marvin Quattlebaum Jr., who was elevated to the United States Court of Appeals for the Fourth Circuit on September 4, 2018. On October 16, 2019, a hearing on her nomination was held before the Senate Judiciary Committee. On November 7, 2019, her nomination was reported out of committee by an 18–4 vote. On December 4, 2019, the United States Senate invoked cloture on her nomination by a 79–14 vote. On December 5, 2019, her nomination was confirmed by a 76–13 vote. She received her judicial commission on December 10, 2019.

Legal offices
Preceded by Bill Nettles	United States Attorney for the District of South Carolina; 2018–2019	Succeeded by Peter M. McCoy Jr.
Preceded by A. Marvin Quattlebaum Jr.	Judge of the United States District Court for the District of South Carolina; 2019–present	Incumbent
Preceded by Timothy M. Cain	Chief Judge of the United States District Court for the District of South Carolina; 2026–present	Incumbent
