= Corey Ellis =

Corey Ellis may refer to:

- Corey F. Ellis (born 1968), American lawyer
- Corey Ellis (footballer) (born 1996), Australian rules footballer
