= Reginald I. Lloyd =

American lawyer

United States Attorney for the District of South Carolina
- President: George W. Bush
- Preceded by: J. Strom Thurmond Jr.
- Succeeded by: Walt Wilkins III

Personal details
- Education: Winthrop University

Reginald "Reggie" I. Lloyd is an American lawyer. He served as the United States Attorney for the District of South Carolina, the first African-American to serve in that capacity on a permanent basis since Reconstruction.

== Early life and education ==
Lloyd received a B.A. in Political Science from Winthrop University and a J.D., the University of South Carolina School of Law.

== Legal career ==
Lloyd practiced law in Columbia for the firm Nelson Mullins, for the South Carolina House Judiciary Committee and the South Carolina Attorney General's Office. Prior to that, Lloyd served as a South Carolina Circuit Court judge. In 2006, Lloyd was named United States Attorney for the District of South Carolina by President George W. Bush.

In 2011, Lloyd was hired by South Carolina State University. In 2018, Lloyd represented Jim Harrison in the South Carolina Statehouse corruption investigation case.

== Political career ==
Gov. Mark Sanford named Lloyd Chief of SLED, after former Chief Robert Stewart retired from the position. Lloyd stepped down from the position in 2011.

== Controversy ==
In 2019, the State of South Carolina suspended Lloyd's law license, due to fines and failure to take required continuing education courses.
