= Old Greenville City Hall =

- Greenville City Hall
- Formerly listed on the U.S. National Register of Historic Places
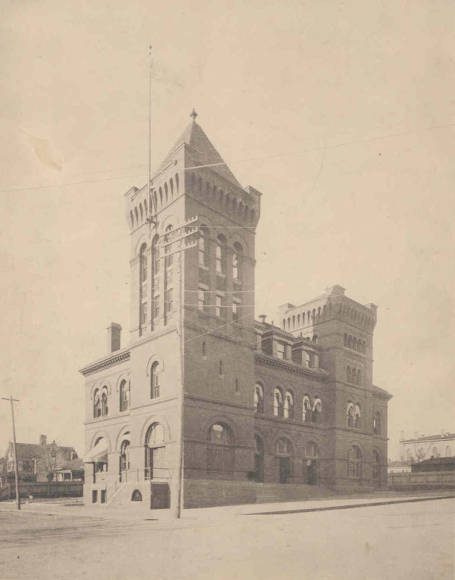
- Old Greenville City Hall

- Location within South Carolina Location within the United States
- Location: Main and Broad Sts., Greenville, South Carolina
- Coordinates: 34°50′52″N 82°24′2″W
- Area: 1 acre (0.40 ha)
- Built: 1889
- Architect: Windrim, James H.
- Architectural style: Romanesque, Richardsonian Romanesque
- NRHP reference No.: 71001067

Significant dates
- Added to NRHP: August 19, 1971
- Removed from NRHP: January 1, 1973

Old Greenville City Hall is a former building in Greenville, South Carolina, originally built as the U.S. Courthouse and Post Office in 1889 on the corner of Main and Broad Streets. Transferred to the city of Greenville in 1938, it served as the Greenville city hall. It was listed in the National Register of Historic Places on August 19, 1971, and was removed in 1973 after its demolition.

== History ==
The courthouse and post office was designed by James H. Windrim, who was Supervisory Architect for the United States Department of the Treasury. and built on the site of the home of Colonel David Hoke. The resident architect for the construction was James R. Lawrence, who moved from Port Huron, Michigan, to complete the project.

In 1909, James Knox Taylor was the Supervisory Architect for an addition to its north side. More alterations or minor additions were made in 1923, 1924, 1927, 1929, and 1931.

The U.S. Circuit Court for the Western District of South Carolina met here until 1898. The U.S. District Court for the Western District of South Carolina met here until 1937.

The city of Greenville traded the federal government a parcel of land on East Washington Street for the courthouse. After construction of a new post office on that parcel, the building became the Greenville City Hall in 1938.

A new city hall was built on an adjoining lot formerly occupied by a Masonic Temple, the Old City Hall was demolished in 1973, and a parking garage was built on its site across Broad Street from the Peace Center.

== Architecture ==
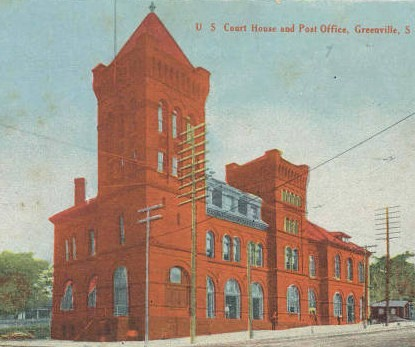
U.S. Court House and Post Office from a ca. 1910 postcard showing the addition

The two-story building was designed in Richardsonian Romanesque style with a red tiled roof, castellated towers, and precast terracotta insets. The foyer had pink marble floors and the staircase that led to the tower was designed with half-turns on its landings. The building has been compared to the Smithsonian Castle.

== See also ==
- List of United States federal courthouses in South Carolina
