= Falcon Black Hawkins Jr. =

American judge

Senior Judge of the United States District Court for the District of South Carolina
- In office October 1, 1993 – July 20, 2005

Chief Judge of the United States District Court for the District of South Carolina
- In office 1990–1993
- Preceded by: Solomon Blatt Jr.
- Succeeded by: Charles Weston Houck

Judge of the United States District Court for the District of South Carolina
- In office September 26, 1979 – October 1, 1993
- Appointed by: Jimmy Carter
- Preceded by: Seat established by 92 Stat. 1629
- Succeeded by: Cameron McGowan Currie

Personal details
- Born: Falcon Black Hawkins Jr. March 16, 1927 Charleston, South Carolina
- Died: July 20, 2005 (aged 78) Mount Pleasant, South Carolina
- Education: The Citadel (BS); University of South Carolina School of Law (JD)

Falcon Black Hawkins Jr. (March 16, 1927 – July 20, 2005) was a United States district judge of the United States District Court for the District of South Carolina.

== Education and career ==
Born in Charleston, South Carolina, Hawkins graduated from North Charleston High School in 1944. He was briefly in the United States Merchant Marine before he enlisted as a private in the United States Army at the end of World War II, from 1945 to 1946. He later received a Bachelor of Science degree from The Citadel in 1958 and a Juris Doctor from the University of South Carolina School of Law in 1963. He was a veteran student at The Citadel and concurrently worked at the Charleston Naval Shipyard where he held the position of Leadingman Electronics. He was in private practice in Charleston from 1963 to 1979. He was initially in private practice with future United States Senator Ernest F. Hollings at the law firm of Hollings and Hawkins, until Hollings entered the United States Senate in 1967.

== Federal judicial service ==
On June 5, 1979, Hawkins was nominated by President Jimmy Carter to a new seat on the United States District Court for the District of South Carolina created by 92 Stat. 1629. He was confirmed by the United States Senate on September 25, 1979, and received his commission on September 26, 1979. He served as Chief Judge from 1990 to 1993, assuming senior status on October 1, 1993. Hawkins served in that capacity until his death, at his home in Mount Pleasant, South Carolina, on July 20, 2005.

In the 1990s, Hawkins served as the judge for the trials arising out of Operation Lost Trust.

== Honor ==
In 2003, Hawkins was awarded an honorary Doctor of Laws (Legum Doctor, LL.D.) from The Citadel.

== Sources ==
Legal offices
Preceded by Seat established by 92 Stat. 1629	Judge of the United States District Court for the District of South Carolina; 1979–1993	Succeeded by Cameron McGowan Currie
Preceded by Solomon Blatt Jr.	Chief Judge of the United States District Court for the District of South Carolina; 1990–1993	Succeeded by Charles Weston Houck
