= Judge Duffy =

Judge Duffy may refer to:

- F. Ryan Duffy (1888–1979), judge of the United States Court of Appeals for the Seventh Circuit
- Kevin Duffy (1933–2020), judge of the United States District Court for the Southern District of New York
- Patrick Michael Duffy (born 1943), judge of the United States District Court for the District of South Carolina

== See also ==
- William S. Duffey Jr. (born 1952), judge of the United States District Court for the Northern District of Georgia
