= Timothy M. Cain =

American judge (born 1961)

Timothy Cain
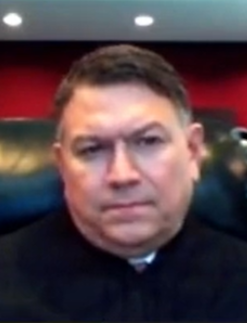

Senior Judge of the United States District Court for the District of South Carolina
- Incumbent
- Assumed office October 1, 2026

Chief Judge of the United States District Court for the District of South Carolina
- In office June 4, 2024 – October 1, 2026
- Preceded by: Robert Bryan Harwell
- Succeeded by: Sherri Lydon

Judge of the United States District Court for the District of South Carolina
- In office September 26, 2011 – October 1, 2026
- Appointed by: Barack Obama
- Preceded by: Patrick Michael Duffy
- Succeeded by: Vacant

Personal details
- Born: Timothy Martin Cain; January 19, 1961 (age 65) Seneca, South Carolina, U.S.
- Education: Anderson University; University of South Carolina (BS, JD)

Timothy Martin Cain (born January 19, 1961) is a senior United States district judge of the United States District Court for the District of South Carolina. He was formerly a South Carolina state judge and a law associate of Senator Lindsey Graham.

== Early life and education ==
Cain was born in Seneca, South Carolina. He attended Anderson College in 1979 and 1980 and earned a Bachelor of Science degree in 1983 from the University of South Carolina. He then earned a Juris Doctor in 1986 from the University of South Carolina School of Law.

== Career ==
After graduating from law school, Cain worked in private legal practice in Walhalla, South Carolina from 1986 until 1988 (including a stint in 1987 as a public defender in Seneca, South Carolina), and then as an assistant county solicitor in Seneca from 1988 until 1989. He then worked as an associate for a Seneca law firm from 1990 until 1991. Cain then worked as a partner in differently comprised firms in Seneca from 1991 until 1993, 1993 until 1996. 1996 until 1998 and 1998 until 2000. During Cain's time in private practice, he worked alongside future United States Senator Lindsey Graham for about three years. Cain also served as county attorney for Oconee County, South Carolina from 1992 until 2000. In 2000, Cain became a family court judge in Columbia, South Carolina.

=== Federal judicial service ===
On February 16, 2011, President Barack Obama nominated Cain to a seat on the United States District Court for the District of South Carolina that had been vacated by Judge Patrick Michael Duffy who assumed senior status in 2009. The Senate confirmed Cain on September 20, 2011 by a 99–0 vote. He received his commission on September 26, 2011. He became the chief judge on June 4, 2024. He assumed senior status on October 1, 2026.

Legal offices
Preceded by Patrick Michael Duffy	Judge of the United States District Court for the District of South Carolina; 2011–2026	Vacant
Preceded by Robert Bryan Harwell	Chief Judge of the United States District Court for the District of South Carolina; 2024–2026	Succeeded by Sherri Lydon
