= Henry Michael Herlong Jr. =

American judge (born 1944)

Senior Judge of the United States District Court for the District of South Carolina
- Incumbent
- Assumed office June 1, 2009

Judge of the United States District Court for the District of South Carolina
- In office May 14, 1991 – June 1, 2009
- Appointed by: George H. W. Bush
- Preceded by: Seat established by 104 Stat. 5089
- Succeeded by: Richard Gergel

Magistrate Judge of the United States District Court for the District of South Carolina
- In office 1986–1991

Personal details
- Born: Henry Michael Herlong Jr. June 1, 1944 (age 81) Washington, D.C., U.S.
- Education: Clemson University (BA); University of South Carolina (JD)

Henry Michael Herlong Jr. (born June 1, 1944) is a senior United States district judge of the United States District Court for the District of South Carolina.

== Education and career ==
Born in Washington, D.C., Herlong received a Bachelor of Arts degree from Clemson University in 1967 and a Juris Doctor from the University of South Carolina School of Law in 1970. He was in the United States Army from 1967 to 1973, achieving the rank of Reserve Captain. He was a legislative assistant to United States Senator Strom Thurmond from 1970 to 1972. He was an Assistant United States Attorney of the Criminal Division in Greenville, South Carolina from 1972 to 1976. He was in private practice in Edgefield, South Carolina from 1976 to 1983. He was an Assistant United States Attorney of the Civil Division in Columbia, South Carolina from 1983 to 1986.

== Federal judicial service ==
Herlong became a United States magistrate judge of the United States District Court for the District of South Carolina in 1986, serving in this capacity until 1991. On April 9, 1991, Herlong was nominated by President George H. W. Bush to a new seat on the United States District Court for the District of South Carolina created by 104 Stat. 5089. Herlong was confirmed by the United States Senate on May 9, 1991, and received his commission on May 14, 1991. He assumed senior status on June 1, 2009.

== Sources ==
Legal offices
Preceded by Seat established by 104 Stat. 5089	Judge of the United States District Court for the District of South Carolina; 1991–2009	Succeeded by Richard Mark Gergel
