= Spencer Wetmore =

American politician

Member of the South Carolina House of Representatives from the 115th district
- In office August 11, 2020 – December 2026
- Preceded by: Peter McCoy
- Succeeded by: Nick Uricchio

Personal details
- Born: April 22, 1983 (age 43) Charleston, South Carolina, U.S.
- Party: Democratic
- Spouse: Burns
- Children: 2
- Education: Princeton University (BA); Vanderbilt University (JD)

Elizabeth "Spencer" Wetmore is an American politician from the state of South Carolina. She is a Democratic member of the South Carolina House of Representatives from the 115th district.

== Early life, education and career ==
Wetmore is from Charleston, South Carolina. She graduated from Academic Magnet High School in North Charleston, South Carolina, Princeton University, and Vanderbilt University Law School. After being sworn into the South Carolina Bar in 2010, Wetmore served as a Prosecutor for the Ninth Circuit Solicitor‘s Office in Charleston County.

== Political career ==
=== Municipal service ===
In 2015, Wetmore was appointed city manager for Folly Beach, South Carolina.

20South Carolina House of Representatives election

When Peter McCoy resigned from the 115th district seat in the South Carolina House to serve as a U.S. Attorney in 2020, Wetmore ran in the special election to succeed him and won the election on August 11, 2020. She serves on the House Judiciary Committee and the Regulations and Administrative Procedures Committee.

On January 9, 2026, Wetmore announced on Facebook that she would not seek re-election in 2026. Nick Uricchio was elected to succeed Wetmore.

== Personal life ==
Wetmore and her husband, Burns, have lived in Folly Beach since 2012. They have two daughters.
