= Nick Uricchio =

American politician and attorney

Member of the South Carolina House of Representatives from the 115th district
- Incumbent
- Assumed office December 2026
- Preceded by: Spencer Wetmore

Personal details
- Party: Democratic
- Profession: Attorney

Nick Uricchio is an American politician from the state of South Carolina. He is a Democratic member-elect of the South Carolina House of Representatives from the 115th district.

== Early life, education and career ==
Uricchio grew up on James Island and Folly Beach. He is a graduate of James Island High School, Coastal Carolina University, and Charleston School of Law. In 2019, he served as an Assistant Solicitor in the Ninth Circuit Solicitor's Office focusing on Violent crimes. In May 2023, Nick joined Query, Sautter & Uricchio, LLC, where he focuses on helping clients with their civil and criminal legal needs..

== Political career ==
On January 9, 2026, Democratic incumbent Spencer Wetmore announced on Facebook that she would not seek re-election in 2026. Uricchio filed for the seat. He defeated Republican nominee Johnnie Garmon in the general election.
