= David C. Norton =

American judge (born 1946)

Chief Judge of the United States District Court for the District of South Carolina
- In office 2007–2012
- Preceded by: Joseph F. Anderson
- Succeeded by: Margaret B. Seymour

Judge of the United States District Court for the District of South Carolina
- Incumbent
- Assumed office July 12, 1990
- Appointed by: George H. W. Bush
- Preceded by: Solomon Blatt Jr.

Personal details
- Born: David Charles Norton; July 25, 1946 (age 79) Washington, D.C., U.S.
- Education: Sewanee: The University of the South (BA); University of South Carolina (JD)

David Charles Norton (born July 25, 1946) is a United States district judge of the United States District Court for the District of South Carolina.

== Education and career ==
Born in Washington, D.C., Norton received a Bachelor of Arts degree from Sewanee: The University of the South in 1968. He served in the United States Navy from January 1969 to October 1972 and became a Yeoman Second Class. He then received a Juris Doctor from the University of South Carolina School of Law in 1975, and was in private practice in Charleston, South Carolina until 1977. He was an assistant deputy solicitor for the Ninth Judicial Circuit in Charleston, South Carolina from 1977 to 1980. He was a city attorney of Isle of Palms, South Carolina from 1980 to 1985. He was in private practice in Charleston from 1981 to 1990, and was a partner at the law firm of Holmes & Thomson.

== Federal judicial service ==
On April 18, 1990, Norton was nominated by President George H. W. Bush to a seat on the United States District Court for the District of South Carolina that was vacated by Judge Solomon Blatt Jr. Norton was confirmed by the United States Senate on June 28, 1990, and received his commission on July 12, 1990. He served as Chief Judge from 2007 to 2012.

Norton is a member of the Board of Advisors of the Charleston School of Law.

=== Notable cases ===
- Norton presided over the criminal case of Michael Slager, a police officer who killed Walter Scott, an unarmed black man, in April 2015 after a traffic stop in North Charleston, South Carolina. Scott was fleeing the officer when he was shot five times in the back. Slager pleaded guilty to federal charges of violating Scott's civil rights. Norton sentenced Slager to 20 years' imprisonment, a sentence within the Federal Sentencing Guidelines.
- In July 2017, Norton found that plaintiffs with mesothelioma still needed to prove defendants specifically caused their diseases, even though every exposure to asbestos is unsafe. A Wall Street Journal article revealed Norton actually owned stocks in the defendants of several asbestos cases whom issued rulings that broadly benefits companies with asbestos liabilities.
- On August 3, 2018, Norton ruled that Charleston cannot require that tour guides pass a history test before being licensed.
- * On August 17, 2018, Norton ruled the Trump Administration did not properly seek public input when it suspended protections designed to thwart waterway pollution. Seen as a win for environmental groups, Norton's ruling allows restrictions on development around certain waterways.
- On March 11, 2020, Norton ruled that South Carolina cannot ban the mention of same-sex relationships or other LGBTQ+ topics in sex education classes. Norton ruled that the law discriminated on the basis of sexual orientation, violated the Constitution's Equal Protection Clause, and had no rational relations to any legitimate state interest. Norton's decision will allow schools to include same-sex relationships or other aspects of LGBTQ+ life in sex ed courses, but will not require it.

== See also ==
- List of United States federal judges by longevity of service

Legal offices
Preceded by Solomon Blatt Jr.	Judge of the United States District Court for the District of South Carolina; 1990–present	Incumbent
Preceded by Joseph F. Anderson	Chief Judge of the United States District Court for the District of South Carolina; 2007–2012	Succeeded by Margaret B. Seymour
