= A. Marvin Quattlebaum Jr. =

American judge (born 1964)

Marvin Quattlebaum
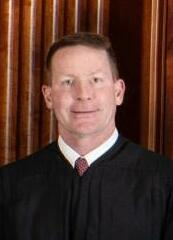
- Quattlebaum in 2022

Judge of the United States Court of Appeals for the Fourth Circuit
- Incumbent
- Assumed office September 4, 2018
- Appointed by: Donald Trump
- Preceded by: William Byrd Traxler Jr.

Judge of the United States District Court for the District of South Carolina
- In office March 6, 2018 – September 6, 2018
- Appointed by: Donald Trump
- Preceded by: Cameron McGowan Currie
- Succeeded by: Sherri Lydon

Personal details
- Born: Arthur Marvin Quattlebaum Jr. August 2, 1964 (age 62) Durham, North Carolina, U.S.
- Education: Rhodes College (BA); University of South Carolina (JD)

Arthur Marvin Quattlebaum Jr. (born August 2, 1964) is a United States circuit judge of the United States Court of Appeals for the Fourth Circuit. He was formerly a United States district judge of the United States District Court for the District of South Carolina.

== Biography ==
Quattlebaum was born on August 2, 1964, in Durham, North Carolina. He received his Bachelor of Arts, cum laude, from Rhodes College and his Juris Doctor from the University of South Carolina School of Law, where he was a member of the South Carolina Law Review.

He started his legal career as an associate at Nelson Mullins Riley & Scarborough, where he was a partner before becoming a judge. His nationwide trial practice focused on complex civil litigation in federal courts. On the basis of this experience, he was invited to serve as a fellow in the American College of Trial Lawyers. From 2011 to 2012, he served as the president of the South Carolina Bar. And, in 2021, he is serving as the Chair of Greenville's YMCA Board.

== Federal judicial service ==
=== District court service ===
On August 3, 2017, President Donald Trump nominated Quattlebaum to serve as a United States district judge of the United States District Court for the District of South Carolina, to the seat vacated by Judge Cameron McGowan Currie, who assumed senior status on October 3, 2013. On October 4, 2017, a hearing on his nomination was held before the Senate Judiciary Committee. On October 26, 2017, his nomination was reported out of committee by a voice vote. On February 28, 2018, the United States Senate invoked cloture on his nomination by a 69–29 vote. On March 1, 2018, his nomination was confirmed by a 69–28 vote. The senators who voted against confirming Quattlebaum did so not because they found him unqualified, but as a protest vote over the fact that in 2013 and 2016, the Senate had not advanced two black nominees for the same South Carolina judgeship. Quattlebaum received his judicial commission on March 6, 2018. His service on the district court terminated on September 6, 2018, upon elevation to the court of appeals.

=== Court of appeals service ===
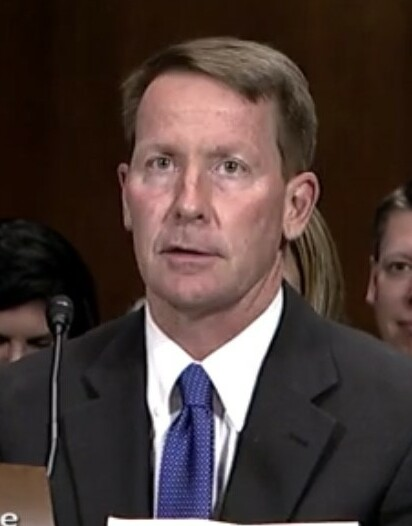
U.S. Senate Judiciary Committee hearing

On April 26, 2018, President Trump announced his intent to nominate Quattlebaum to serve as a United States circuit judge of the United States Court of Appeals for the Fourth Circuit. On May 7, 2018, his nomination was sent to the Senate. He was nominated to the seat being vacated by Judge William Byrd Traxler Jr., who announced his intention to assume senior status on August 31, 2018. On June 20, 2018, a hearing on his nomination was held before the Senate Judiciary Committee. On July 19, 2018, his nomination was reported out of committee by a 15–6 vote. On August 15, 2018, the Senate invoked cloture on Quattlebaum's nomination by a 61–28 vote. On August 16, 2018, his nomination was confirmed by a 62–28 vote. He received his judicial commission on September 4, 2018.

==== Notable opinions ====
- Peltier v. Charter Day School Inc., --- F.4th ----, 2021 WL 3483288 (Aug. 9, 2021). In a challenge to a charter school's dress code, the court reversed the district court on two grounds. First, the court held that the charter school was not a state actor and thus not subject to an equal protection claim. More importantly, the court found that claims of sex discrimination related to a dress code are not categorically excluded from the scope of Title IX. Thus, the case was sent back to the district court for further proceedings on the Title IX claim.
- Eline v. Town of Ocean City, Maryland, 7 F.4th 214 (4th Cir. 2021). Rejecting a § 1983 action challenging a city ordinance prohibiting women from baring their breasts in public, the court found the ordinance did not violate the plaintiff's equal protection rights.

Legal offices
Preceded by Cameron McGowan Currie	Judge of the United States District Court for the District of South Carolina; 2018	Succeeded by Sherri Lydon
Preceded by William Byrd Traxler Jr.	Judge of the United States Court of Appeals for the Fourth Circuit; 2018–present	Incumbent
