= Courts of South Carolina =

Courts of South Carolina include:

State courts of South Carolina

- South Carolina Supreme Court
  - South Carolina Court of Appeals
    - South Carolina Circuit Courts (16 circuits)
    - South Carolina Family Courts
    - South Carolina Probate Courts
    - South Carolina Magistrate Courts
    - South Carolina Municipal Courts

Federal courts located in South Carolina

- United States District Court for the District of South Carolina
