= Joseph F. Anderson =

American judge (born 1949)

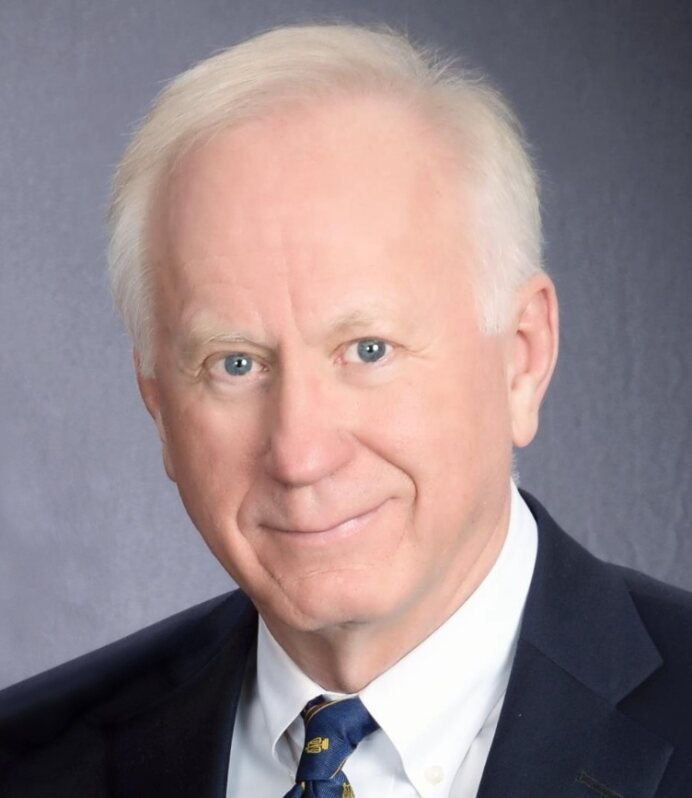

Senior Judge of the United States District Court for the District of South Carolina
- Incumbent
- Assumed office November 16, 2014

Chief Judge of the United States District Court for the District of South Carolina
- In office 2000–2007
- Preceded by: Charles Weston Houck
- Succeeded by: David C. Norton

Judge of the United States District Court for the District of South Carolina
- In office October 14, 1986 – November 16, 2014
- Appointed by: Ronald Reagan
- Preceded by: Charles Earl Simons Jr.
- Succeeded by: Donald C. Coggins Jr.

Personal details
- Born: Joseph Fletcher Anderson Jr. November 16, 1949 (age 76) Augusta, Georgia, U.S.
- Education: Clemson University (BA); University of South Carolina (JD)

Military service
- Allegiance: United States
- Branch/service: United States Army
- Years of service: 1972-1978 (Reserves)

Joseph Fletcher Anderson Jr. (born November 16, 1949) is a senior United States district judge of the United States District Court for the District of South Carolina.

== Education and career ==
Anderson was raised in Edgefield, South Carolina. He received a Bachelor of Arts degree in political science from Clemson University in 1972, where he was a member of Sigma Nu fraternity. He received a Juris Doctor from the University of South Carolina School of Law in 1975. He was a law clerk for Judge Clement Haynsworth of the United States Court of Appeals for the Fourth Circuit from 1975 to 1976. He was in private practice in Edgefield with his father and brother from 1976 to 1986. He was a Member of the South Carolina House of Representatives from 1980 to 1986. Additionally, he served in the U.S. Army Reserves from 1972 to 1978.

== Honorary degree ==
Anderson holds honorary degrees from Clemson (2009) and the University of South Carolina (2006).

== Federal judicial service ==
Anderson was nominated by President Ronald Reagan on September 26, 1986, to a seat on the United States District Court for the District of South Carolina vacated by Judge Charles Earl Simons Jr. He was confirmed by the United States Senate on October 8, 1986, and received his commission on October 14, 1986. Anderson was the youngest federal judge in South Carolina history at the time of his appointment. He served as Chief Judge from 2000 to 2007. He assumed senior status on November 16, 2014.

In 2026, he was elected as the Fourth Circuit representative to the U.S. Judicial Conference which is the policy making body for the federal judiciary. Chief Justice John Roberts then appointed Anderson to the Executive Committee, which sets agenda for, and makes recommendations to, the full conference.

== Noteworthy Trials ==
In 2005, Anderson presided over the six-week trial arising out of the crash of commercial airline with 57 passengers.

In 2004, he tried the first federal death penalty trial in South Carolina.

== Court Secrecy Initiative ==
In 2002, while serving as Chief Judge, Anderson successfully prompted his court to adopt a first-in-its-notion local rule outlawing secret settlements in cases including public safety.

== Teaching Experience ==
Anderson has taught Evidence and Federal Courts at the Joseph F. Rice University of South Carolina School of Law for over two decades. He was twice voted Best Classroom Teacher by the student body.

== Recognitions ==
In 2014, Anderson was presented with the American Inns of Court Professionalism Award for the Fourth Circuit, which recognizes civility, professionalism, and legal skills.

== Publications ==
Anderson has published two books, The Lost Art: An Advocate's Guide to Effective Opening Statements and Closing Arguments (1999), and Effective Courtroom Advocacy (2009). The former was recognized by the Association for Continuing Legal Education as Best Publication in 1999.

He has also authored pieces for the South Carolina Law Review, Villanova Law Review, Chicago-Kent Law Review, Federal Courts Law Review,several articles in South Carolina Lawyer Magazine, and Voire Dire Magazine.

== Sources ==
- "Acclaimed Federal Judge". Clemson World. Spring 2010. Clemson, South Carolina: Clemson University. 27.

Legal offices
Preceded by Charles Earl Simons Jr.	Judge of the United States District Court for the District of South Carolina; 1986–2014	Succeeded by Donald C. Coggins Jr.
Preceded by Charles Weston Houck	Chief Judge of the United States District Court for the District of South Carolina; 2000–2007	Succeeded by David C. Norton
