= Bill Nettles =

American lawyer

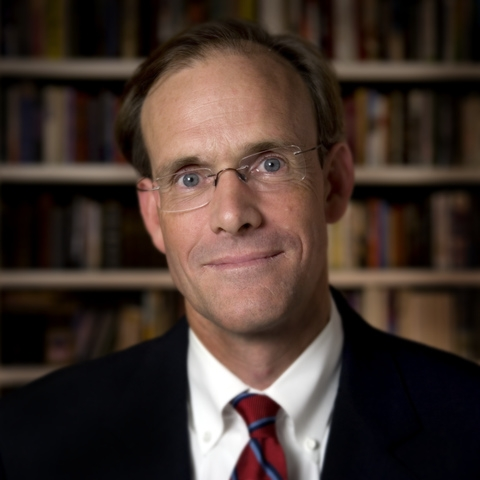

United States Attorney for the District of South Carolina
- In office May 3, 2010 – June 15, 2016
- President: Barack Obama
- Preceded by: Walt Wilkins III
- Succeeded by: Sherri Lydon

Personal details
- Born: William Norman Nettles; July 8, 1961 (age 65)
- Party: Democratic
- Education: The Citadel (BS); Widener University (JD)
- Website: http://www.billnettleslaw.com/

William Norman Nettles (born July 8, 1961) is an American lawyer. He served as the United States attorney for the District of South Carolina from 2010 to 2016.

== Education ==
Nettles completed his undergraduate education at The Citadel. He graduated with a Juris Doctor from the Widener University School of Law.

== Career ==
From 1992 to 1995, Nettles was an assistant public defender in the Richland County public defender's office in Columbia, South Carolina. He entered private practice in 1997.

Nettles defended Bobby Lee Holmes in a 2001 retrial for the murder of 86-year-old Mary Stewart. Nettles attempted to introduce evidence implicating that someone other than Holmes committed the crime. The court refused to admit the evidence and Holmes was convicted and sentenced to death for a second time. When the case appeared before the U.S. Supreme Court in Holmes v. South Carolina, the court unanimously overturned Holmes' conviction in the second trial because the exclusion of evidence violated his right to present a full defense.

Nettles entered practice with Alex Sanders, a former South Carolina Court of Appeals chief judge, in 2005, forming Sanders & Nettles, LLC. Nettles represented Michael Phelps when he was investigated for marijuana possession after being photographed holding a bong at a house party in Columbia. Phelps was not charged.

After serving as the U.S. attorney for the District of South Carolina for six years, Nettles returned to private practice. He tries criminal defense, whistleblower, personal injury, and general civil cases from an office in Columbia.

In 2017, the city of North Charleston hired Nettles to act as the initial facilitator for the 25-person Citizens' Advisory Commission on Community-Police Relations.

In private practice, Nettles was involved with various major cases. In 2023, he oversaw a $36.5 million settlement with St. Francis Physician Services, Inc. over allegations under the False Claims Act.

== Political career ==
During the 2008 South Carolina Democratic primary, Nettles led the legal team for Barack Obama's campaign in the state. After the resignation of U.S. Attorney Walt Wilkins, Obama appointed Nettles the U.S. Attorney for the District of South Carolina. The U.S. Senate confirmed the nomination unanimously.

Nettles took office in 2010. As U.S. attorney, he focused his office's prosecution efforts on public corruption, white-collar crime, and cases under the federal False Claims Act. He added five attorneys to the civil litigation staff, and, throughout his time in office, South Carolina was among the leading districts for financial recovery from false claims. His office pursued federal corruption charges against Lexington County Sheriff Jimmy Metts, the longest-serving sheriff in South Carolina history, with Metts ultimately pleading guilty to conspiracy to harbor illegal immigrants.

He also placed less emphasis on drug crime prosecutions and convictions. Nettles collaborated with community leaders in North Charleston to launch the Stop and Take a New Direction (STAND) program, an initiative that allowed a select number of street-level drug dealers facing federal narcotics charges to avoid prison in exchange for participating in a rehabilitation program. Attorney General Eric Holder and other federal and state law enforcement officials applauded the program, which Nettles brought to two other cities in South Carolina. He also launched the South Carolina Alliance for Drug Endangered Children, which provides support and health and safety services to children whose parents are arrested on drug charges.

During his tenure as U.S. Attorney, Nettles settled several major cases. In 2012, Nettles was involved in a mortgage fraud whistleblower case that resulted in multimillion-dollar settlements. In 2013, he was involved in a $24.9 million settlement with Amgen Inc. over allegations that the company improperly used charitable foundations to cover Medicare copays for its drugs. In 2015, he oversaw a $48.5 million settlement with Health Diagnostics Laboratory Inc. and Singulex Inc., both accused of paying kickbacks to physicians and patient recruiters.

In 2016, he announced a $34.8 million settlement with Respironics, Inc. to resolve allegations that the company provided illegal incentives to suppliers of sleep apnea masks.

Nettles resigned from the U.S. Attorney's office in 2016.
