= Peter M. McCoy Jr. =

American lawyer & politician (born 1978)

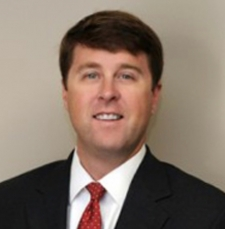

United States Ambassador to Montenegro
- Nominee
- Assuming office TBD
- President: Donald Trump
- Succeeding: Michael C. Keays (chargé d'affaires)

United States Attorney for the District of South Carolina
- In office March 30, 2020 – February 28, 2021; Interim: March 30, 2020 – June 18, 2020
- President: Donald Trump; Joe Biden
- Preceded by: Sherri Lydon
- Succeeded by: Adair Ford Boroughs

Member of the South Carolina House of Representatives from the 115th district
- In office 2011 – March 30, 2020
- Preceded by: Anne Peterson Hutto
- Succeeded by: Spencer Wetmore

Personal details
- Born: August 20, 1978 (age 48) Charleston, South Carolina
- Party: Republican
- Spouse: Jennifer Blanchard
- Children: 3
- Education: Hampden–Sydney College (B.A.); Regent University School of Law (J.D.)

Peter Michael McCoy Jr. (born August 20, 1978) is an American attorney and politician who served as the United States Attorney for the District of South Carolina from 2020 to 2021. He was a member of the South Carolina House of Representatives from 2011 to 2020.

== Education ==
McCoy earned his Bachelor of Arts from Hampden–Sydney College and his Juris Doctor from Regent University School of Law.

== Legal career ==
McCoy was an Assistant Solicitor in the Ninth Circuit Solicitor's Office in Charleston. Until his appointment as United States Attorney, he was a partner at McCoy & Stokes in Charleston, South Carolina, where his practice focused on criminal defense in both state and federal courts, as well as family, personal injury, and probate law.

== Political career ==
=== South Carolina House of Representatives ===
From 2011 to 2020, McCoy served as a member of the South Carolina House of Representatives. He chaired the SC House Utility Ratepayer Protection Committee which reviewed the V.C. Summer project.

=== U.S. Attorney ===
On February 26, 2020, President Donald Trump announced his intent to nominate McCoy to be the United States Attorney for the District of South Carolina. His nomination was officially sent to the United States Senate on March 2.

On March 30, 2020, U.S. Attorney General Bill Barr appointed McCoy as the interim U.S. Attorney for the District of South Carolina. He was confirmed by a voice vote of the Senate on June 18, 2020. McCoy oversaw prosecutions in the VC Summer case.

On February 8, 2021, he along with 55 other Trump-era attorneys were asked to resign. He announced his resignation on February 23, effective February 28.

=== Post federal government work ===
In April 2021, months after vacating his office as US attorney, Governor Henry McMaster nominated McCoy to become chair of Santee Cooper board of directors. McCoy was unanimously confirmed by the South Carolina Senate in June 2021.

== Personal life ==
McCoy lives with his wife and their three children on James Island. He is a member of Grace Episcopal Church where he teaches Sunday School for kindergartners.
