= Margaret B. Seymour =

American judge

Co-General Counsel for the Charleston County School District
- Incumbent
- Assumed office October 14, 2022

Senior Judge of the United States District Court for the District of South Carolina
- In office January 16, 2013 – August 31, 2022

Chief Judge of the United States District Court for the District of South Carolina
- In office January 3, 2012 – January 16, 2013
- Preceded by: David C. Norton
- Succeeded by: Terry L. Wooten

Judge of the United States District Court for the District of South Carolina
- In office October 22, 1998 – January 16, 2013
- Appointed by: Bill Clinton
- Preceded by: William Byrd Traxler Jr.
- Succeeded by: Bruce Howe Hendricks

Magistrate Judge of the United States District Court for the District of South Carolina
- In office 1996–1998

United States Attorney for the District of South Carolina Acting
- In office January 1996 – May 1996
- President: Bill Clinton
- Succeeded by: J. Rene Josey
- In office April 1993 – May 1993
- President: Bill Clinton
- Preceded by: John S. Simmons

Personal details
- Born: Margaret Louise Beane Seymour; January 16, 1947 (age 79) Washington, D.C., U.S.
- Spouse: Joseph D. Shine
- Education: Howard University (BA); American University (JD)

Margaret Louise Beane Seymour (born January 16, 1947) is an American lawyer. She was a United States district judge of the United States District Court for the District of South Carolina.

== Education and career ==
Born in Washington, D.C., Seymour received a Bachelor of Arts degree from Howard University in 1969 and a Juris Doctor from Washington College of Law at American University in 1977. She was an equal opportunity specialist for the United States Department of Health, Education & Welfare from 1972 to 1979, and for the United States Equal Employment Opportunity Commission from 1979 to 1980. She was an attorney in the Office of Civil Rights of the United States Department of Education from 1980 to 1988. She was in private practice from 1988 to 1990. She was an Assistant United States Attorney of the District of South Carolina from 1990 to 1996, serving as the United States Attorney (interim) for that district from 1993 to 1996.

=== Federal judicial service ===
Seymour was a United States magistrate judge for the United States District Court for the District of South Carolina from 1996 to 1998. On September 9, 1998, Seymour was nominated by President Bill Clinton to a seat on the District of South Carolina vacated by William Byrd Traxler Jr. She was confirmed by the United States Senate on October 21, 1998, and received her commission on October 22, 1998. On January 3, 2012, she became chief judge, serving as such until she took senior status on January 16, 2013. She retired on August 31, 2022.

== See also ==
- List of African-American federal judges
- List of African-American jurists

== Sources ==
- Confirmation hearings on federal appointments : hearings before the Committee on the Judiciary, United States Senate, One Hundred Fifth Congress, first session, on confirmation of appointees to the federal judiciary. pt.5 (1999)

Legal offices
Preceded by William Byrd Traxler Jr.	Judge of the United States District Court for the District of South Carolina; 1998–2013	Succeeded by Bruce Howe Hendricks
Preceded by David C. Norton	Chief Judge of the United States District Court for the District of South Carolina; 2012–2013	Succeeded by Terry L. Wooten
