= Terry L. Wooten =

American judge (born 1954)

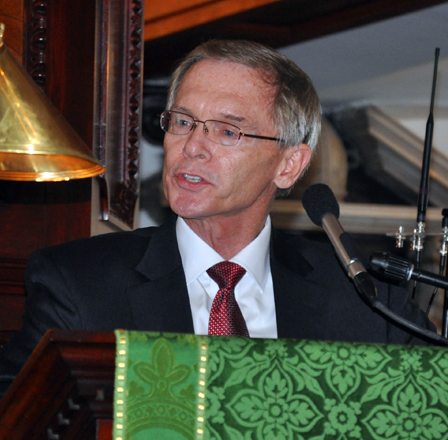

Senior Judge of the United States District Court for the District of South Carolina
- Incumbent
- Assumed office February 28, 2019

Chief Judge of the United States District Court for the District of South Carolina
- In office January 16, 2013 – February 28, 2019
- Preceded by: Margaret B. Seymour
- Succeeded by: Robert Bryan Harwell

Judge of the United States District Court for the District of South Carolina
- In office November 26, 2001 – February 28, 2019
- Appointed by: George W. Bush
- Preceded by: Seat established by 114 Stat. 2762
- Succeeded by: Joseph Dawson III

Magistrate Judge of the United States District Court for the District of South Carolina
- In office 1999–2001

Personal details
- Born: 1954 (age 71–72) Louisville, Kentucky, U.S.
- Education: University of South Carolina (BA, JD)
- Occupation: Judge, lawyer

Terry L. Wooten (born 1954) is a senior United States district judge of the United States District Court for the District of South Carolina.

== Education and career ==
Born in Louisville, Kentucky, Wooten received a Bachelor of Arts degree from the University of South Carolina in 1976 and a Juris Doctor from the University of South Carolina School of Law in 1980. He was in private practice in South Carolina from 1980 to 1982. He was an Assistant Solicitor, Richland County, South Carolina, from 1982 to 1986. He was a Chief counsel, United States Senate Judiciary Committee from 1986 to 1991. He was an Assistant United States Attorney of the United States Attorney's Office, District of South Carolina from 1992 to 1999. His nephew is Will Wooten, a deputy District Attorney in Fulton County, Georgia.

== District court service ==
Wooten was nominated by President George W. Bush on September 4, 2001, to a new seat created by 114 Stat. 2762. He was confirmed by the United States Senate on November 8, 2001, and received his commission on November 26, 2001. He became Chief Judge on January 16, 2013. He assumed senior status on February 28, 2019.

== Sources ==
Legal offices
Preceded by Seat established by 114 Stat. 2762	Judge of the United States District Court for the District of South Carolina; 2001–2019	Succeeded by Joseph Dawson III
Preceded by Margaret B. Seymour	Chief Judge of the United States District Court for the District of South Carolina; 2013–2019	Succeeded by Robert Bryan Harwell
