= List of United States federal courthouses in South Carolina =

The United States federal court system has utilized several courthouses located in the state of South Carolina. These courthouses have housed the United States District Court for the District of South Carolina (D.S.C.) and its predecessors, the Eastern (E.D. S.C.) and Western (W.D. S.C.) Districts of South Carolina. Each entry indicates the name of the building along with an image, if available, its location and the jurisdiction it covers, the dates during which it was used for each such jurisdiction, and, if applicable the person for whom it was named, and the date of renaming. Dates of use will not necessarily correspond with the dates of construction or demolition of a building, as pre-existing structures may be adapted or court use, and former court buildings may later be put to other uses. Also, the official name of the building may be changed at some point after its use as a federal court building has been initiated.

== Courthouses ==
Courthouse	City	Image	Street address	Jurisdiction	Dates of use	Named for
Charles E. Simons, Jr. Federal Court House	Aiken		223 Park Avenue SW	E.D.S.C. D.S.C.	1935–present	District Court judge Charles Earl Simons, Jr. (1986)
U.S. Post Office and Courthouse	Anderson		401 North Main Street	W.D.S.C.	1916–1938; Built in 1910, now privately owned.	n/a
G. Ross Anderson, Jr. Federal Building and U.S. Courthouse†	Anderson		315 South McDuffie Street	W.D.S.C. D.S.C.	1938–present	District Court judge G. Ross Anderson (2001)
Beaufort Federal Courthouse	Beaufort		1501 Bay Street	D.S.C.	1994–2015; Built in 1883, formerly used as the County Courthouse; now a museum.	n/a
John Rutledge House^{††}	Charleston		116 Broad Street	E.D.S.C.	1866–1868; Built in 1763, now the John Rutledge House Inn.	Supreme Court Chief Justice and Governor John Rutledge
U.S. Custom House^{†}	Charleston		200 East Bay Street	E.D.S.C.	1884–1896; Built in 1879, still in use as a custom house.	n/a
U.S. Post Office and Courthouse^{†}	Charleston		85 Broad Street	E.D.S.C. D.S.C.	1896–1988; Still in use as a federal office building.	n/a
J. Waties Waring Judicial Center (formerly the Hollings Judicial Center)	Charleston		83 Meeting Street	D.S.C.	1988–present	Julius Waties Waring (2015); Governor and U.S. Senator Ernest Hollings
U.S. Courthouse and Post Office^{†}	Columbia		1737 Main Street	E.D.S.C. D.S.C.	1874–1936; Now Columbia City Hall.	n/a
J. Bratton Davis U.S. Bankruptcy Courthouse^{†}	Columbia		1100 Laurel Street	E.D.S.C. D.S.C.	1936–present	District Bankruptcy Court judge J. Bratton Davis (2000)
Strom Thurmond Federal Building and U.S. Courthouse†	Columbia		1835 Assembly Street	D.S.C.	1979–2003; Still in use by other federal agencies.	Governor and U.S. Senator Strom Thurmond
Matthew J. Perry, Jr. U.S. Courthouse	Columbia		901 Richland Street	D.S.C.	2003–present	District Court judge Matthew James Perry (2004)
U.S. Post Office and Courthouse^{†}	Florence		201 West Evans Street	D.S.C. E.D.S.C.	1906–1975; Now privately owned.	n/a
McMillan Federal Building	Florence		401 West Evans Street	D.S.C.	1975–present	U.S. Representative John L. McMillan
U.S. Courthouse and Post Office^{*}	Greenville		Main and Broad Streets	W.D.S.C. D.S.C.	1892–1937; Later used as City Hall; razed in 1973.	n/a
Clement F. Haynsworth Jr. Federal Building†	Greenville		300 East Washington Street	W.D.S.C. D.S.C.	1937–present	Court of Appeals judge Clement Haynsworth (1982)
U.S. Post Office and Courthouse	Greenwood		120 Main Street	W.D.S.C. D.S.C.	1915–1968; Now an arts center.	n/a
U.S. Post Office and Courthouse^{†}	Rock Hill		102 Main Street	W.D.S.C. D.S.C.	1932–1983; Now owned by the city.	n/a
Donald S. Russell Federal Building and U.S. Courthouse†	Spartanburg		201 Magnolia Street	W.D.S.C. D.S.C.	1931–present	Governor and U.S. Senator Donald Stuart Russell

=== Key ===
^{†}	Listed on the National Register of Historic Places (NRHP)
^{††}	NRHP-listed and also designated as a National Historic Landmark
^{*}	Formerly listed on the National Register of Historic Places (NRHP)
