= Walt Wilkins III =

American lawyer

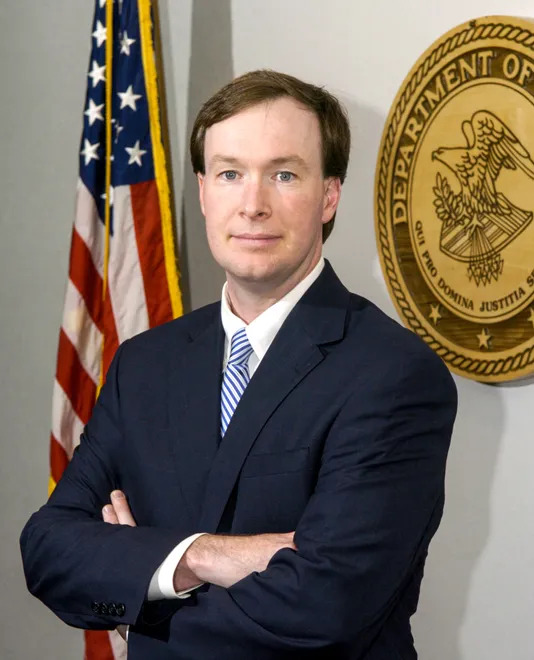
- Wilkins in 2008

United States Attorney for the District of South Carolina
- In office 2008–2010
- President: George W. Bush
- Preceded by: Reginald I. Lloyd
- Succeeded by: Bill Nettles

Personal details
- Education: Wofford College (BA); University of South Carolina (JD)

Walt Wilkins III (born 1974) is an American lawyer. He served as the United States attorney for the District of South Carolina and as the thirteenth Judicial Circuit Court solicitor.

== Early life and education ==
Wilkins, a Greenville native, graduated from Wofford College in 1996 and from the University of South Carolina School Of Law in 1999. He joined Lockheed Martin Aircraft in Argentina as an attorney. In 2000 he joined the law firm of Leatherwood, Walker, Todd and Mann, and served as an adjunct professor at Greenville Technical College. In 2003, he was named Young Lawyer of the Year by the American Board of Trial Advocates.

== Career ==
In 2005, Wilkins served as an assistant U.S. Attorney. In 2008, President George W. Bush appointed him United States Attorney for the District of South Carolina.

== Political career ==
Wilkins was elected solicitor of the Thirteenth Judicial Circuit in 2010.

In 2018, Wilkins accepted the invitation of gubernatorial candidate Catherine Templeton to run as a candidate for Lieutenant Governor. On June 12, Templeton and Wilkins placed third in the Republican Primary.

Wilkins remained solicitor until his resignation from the Solicitor's office in May 2025. Governor Henry McMaster appointed Cynthia S. Crick to fill the vacant position.

== Personal life ==
Wilkins' father, William Walter Wilkins, was a political appointee by President Ronald Reagan. His uncle, David H. Wilkins, served as Speaker of the House and Ambassador to Canada.
