= Max Gergel =

American chemist

Max G. Gergel (July 24, 1921 – July 5, 2017) was an American chemist and art collector. He graduated with a BS in chemical engineering from the University of South Carolina in 1942 and founded the Columbia Organic Chemical Company in 1944; he was a cousin of the Hon. Richard Mark Gergel, a Judge of the U. S. District Court for the District of South Carolina. He died in Columbia, South Carolina, on July 5, 2017, aged 96.

The first volume of his autobiography Excuse Me Sir, Would You Like to Buy a Kilo of Isopropyl Bromide? was published in 1977. Research chemist Derek Lowe described the book as an "extraordinary memoir".

== Published works ==
- Excuse Me Sir, Would You Like to Buy a Kilo of Isopropyl Bromide?
- The Ageless Gergel
