= Sheria Clarke =

American judge (born 1981)

Sheria Akins Clarke
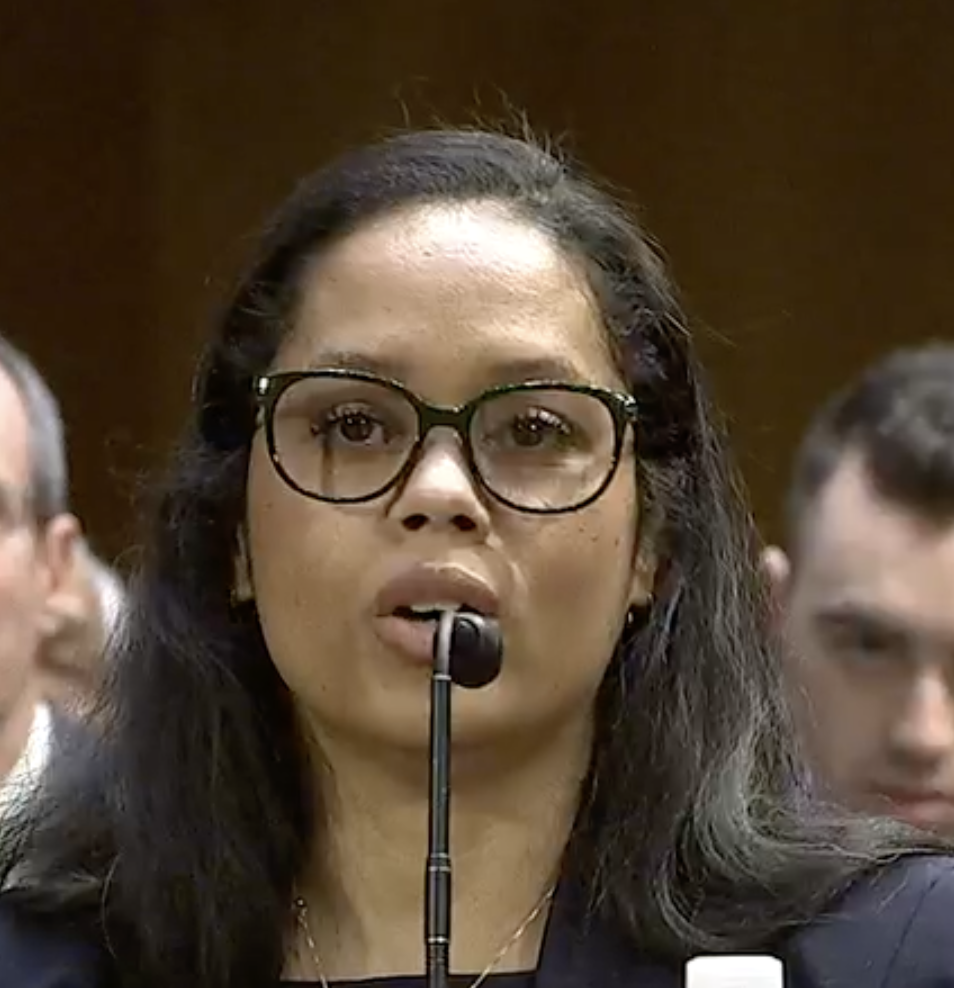
- Clarke in 2026

Judge of the United States District Court for the District of South Carolina
- Incumbent
- Assumed office June 18, 2026
- Appointed by: Donald Trump
- Preceded by: Robert Bryan Harwell

Personal details
- Born: Sheria Agape Akins; November 23, 1981 (age 44) Lynchburg, Virginia, U.S.
- Education: Liberty University (BS); University of North Carolina (JD)

Sheria Akins Clarke (née Akins; born November 23, 1981) is an American lawyer who has served as a United States district judge of the United States District Court for the District of South Carolina since 2026.

== Early life and education ==
Clarke was born on November 23, 1981, in Lynchburg, Virginia. She received a Bachelor of Science degree, cum laude in psychology in 2003 from Liberty University and her Juris Doctor in 2006 from the University of North Carolina School of Law. From 2007 through 2009, she served as a law clerk for Judges Ann Marie Calabria and Wanda Bryant of the North Carolina Court of Appeals.

== Career ==
From 2024 to 2026, Clarke was a lawyer in private practice with the law firm of Nelson Mullins in Greenville, where she focused on regulatory law, white collar criminal defense, and government investigations. She previously served as counsel for the United States House Committee on Ethics, and then as Counsel on the Select Committee on Benghazi. She was then a prosecutor in the United States Department of Justice, and she specialized in False Claims Act litigation and whistleblower investigations. She has also worked as an adjunct professor of government at Wofford College in Spartanburg.

=== Federal judicial service ===
In 2025, Clarke was recommended to the White House Counsel's office by U.S. Senator Tim Scott and former Congressman Trey Gowdy. On February 12, 2026, President Donald Trump announced his intention to nominate Clarke to the seat on the United States District Court for the District of South Carolina vacated by Judge Robert Bryan Harwell. On April 30, 2026, the Judiciary Committee reported her nomination to the floor on a 15–7 vote. On May 19, 2026, the Senate invoked cloture with a 57–38 vote. On the same day the Senate confirmed her by a 52–38 vote. She received her judicial commission on June 18, 2026.

== See also ==
- List of African American jurists
- List of African American federal judges

Legal offices
Preceded by Robert Bryan Harwell	Judge of the United States District Court for the District of South Carolina; 2026–present	Incumbent
