= Solomon Blatt Jr. =

American judge (1921–2016)

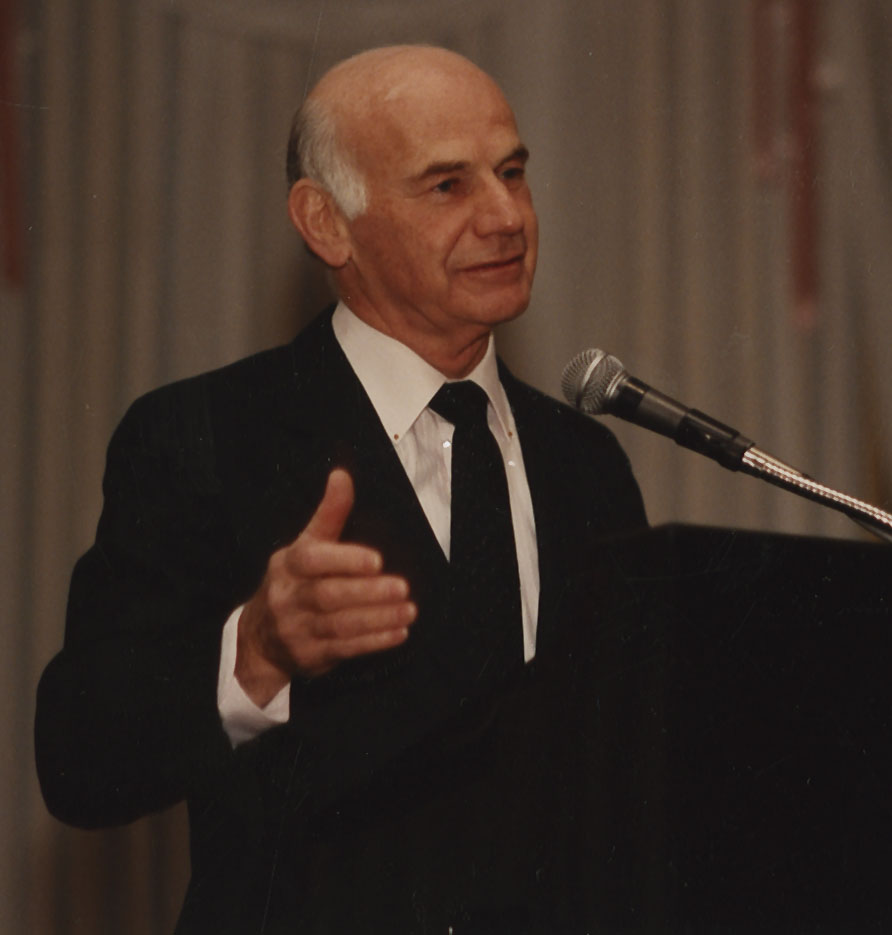

Senior Judge of the United States District Court for the District of South Carolina
- In office May 7, 1990 – April 20, 2016

Chief Judge of the United States District Court for the District of South Carolina
- In office 1986–1990
- Preceded by: Charles Earl Simons Jr.
- Succeeded by: Falcon Black Hawkins Jr.

Judge of the United States District Court for the District of South Carolina
- In office May 28, 1971 – May 7, 1990
- Appointed by: Richard Nixon
- Preceded by: Donald S. Russell
- Succeeded by: David C. Norton

Personal details
- Born: Solomon Blatt Jr. August 20, 1921 Barnwell, South Carolina, U.S.
- Died: April 20, 2016 (aged 94) Charleston, South Carolina, U.S.
- Education: University of South Carolina, Columbia (AB, LLB)

Solomon "Sol" Blatt Jr. (/blɒt/; August 20, 1921 – April 20, 2016) was a United States district judge of the United States District Court for the District of South Carolina and trustee of the University of South Carolina.

== Early life ==
Blatt was born in Barnwell, South Carolina, to Solomon Blatt Sr., speaker of the South Carolina House of Representatives, and Ethel Green. He attended the University of South Carolina and received his Artium Baccalaureus degree in 1941. While at the university, Blatt was a member of the Euphradian Society and on the boxing team, competing in the lightweight class.

== Career ==
Blatt enlisted in the United States Navy after America's entrance into World War II and was commissioned an officer. He served on a destroyer that escorted liberty ships to Europe as well as participating in anti-submarine warfare. After the war, Blatt obtained a Bachelor of Laws in 1946 from the University of South Carolina School of Law and he commenced the practice of law in Barnwell for the firm Blatt and Fales; he remained in private practice until 1971.

In 1971, his father had to resign as a trustee for the University of South Carolina because of a provision in the state constitution prohibiting dual office holding. The elder Blatt nominated his son to the board and the General Assembly approved the nomination. The students responded by hanging an effigy of Speaker Blatt at Maxcy Monument with a poem attached that read "King Sol: Through my son I shall rule, with house members as my tools." As a trustee, Blatt served on the athletic committee and was instrumental in recruiting Frank McGuire as head coach of the men's basketball team.

== Federal judicial service ==
In 1971, through the recommendation of Senator Strom Thurmond, President Nixon nominated Blatt for the vacant judgeship of the United States District Court for the District of South Carolina, a seat vacated by Judge Donald S. Russell. He was confirmed by the United States Senate on May 26, 1971, and received his commission on May 28, 1971. He served as Chief Judge from 1986 to 1990. He assumed senior status on May 7, 1990. His docket consisted primarily of criminal cases. Blatt continued to serve until his death.

Blatt was "the central figure in the complex drama triggered by the insolvency of Hilton Head Holdings." Despite it being unusual for federal district court judges to handle bankruptcy cases, Blatt did not transfer the case because he had a "desire to keep the bankruptcy in friendly hands." The Fourth Circuit Court of Appeals ultimately removed Blatt from the case in mid-1988. Due to Blatt's efforts to solve the bankruptcy matter with a favorable result for the residents of Hilton Head Island, the State's obituary of Blatt called him the "Hilton Head Hero."

== Personal life ==
Blatt married Carolyn Gayden in 1942 and they had three children. He was a strong supporter of South Carolina athletics and had been a season ticket holder for football games since 1946. Blatt died on April 20, 2016, at his Charleston home. The library at the Charleston School of Law is named in his honor.

== See also ==
- List of United States federal judges by longevity of service

Legal offices
Preceded by Donald S. Russell	Judge of the United States District Court for the District of South Carolina; 1971–1990	Succeeded by David C. Norton
Preceded by Charles Earl Simons Jr.	Chief Judge of the United States District Court for the District of South Carolina; 1986–1990	Succeeded by Falcon Black Hawkins Jr.
