= Charles Weston Houck =

American judge

Senior Judge of the United States District Court for the District of South Carolina
- In office October 1, 2003 – July 19, 2017

Chief Judge of the United States District Court for the District of South Carolina
- In office 1993–2000
- Preceded by: Falcon Black Hawkins Jr.
- Succeeded by: Joseph F. Anderson

Judge of the United States District Court for the District of South Carolina
- In office September 26, 1979 – October 1, 2003
- Appointed by: Jimmy Carter
- Preceded by: Seat established by 92 Stat. 1629
- Succeeded by: Robert Bryan Harwell

Personal details
- Born: Charles Weston Houck; April 16, 1933 Florence, South Carolina
- Died: July 19, 2017 (aged 84) Charleston, South Carolina
- Education: University of South Carolina School of Law (LLB)

Charles Weston Houck (April 16, 1933 – July 19, 2017) was a United States district judge of the United States District Court for the District of South Carolina.

== Education and career ==
Houck was born in Florence, South Carolina and attended McClenaghan High School. Houck received a Bachelor of Laws from the University of South Carolina School of Law in 1956, and was in the United States Army from 1957 to 1958. While in the army, he became a captain in the Judge Advocate General's Corps. He was in private practice in Florence from 1958 to 1979, also serving as a South Carolina state representative from 1963 to 1966. He was Chairman of the Florence, South Carolina City-County Building Commission from 1968 to 1976.

== Federal judicial service ==
On June 5, 1979, Houck was nominated by President Jimmy Carter to a new seat on the United States District Court for the District of South Carolina created by 92 Stat. 1629. He was confirmed by the United States Senate on September 25, 1979, and received his commission on September 26, 1979. He served as Chief Judge from 1993 to 2000, and assumed senior status on October 1, 2003, serving in that status until his death in Florence, South Carolina on July 19, 2017.

== Notable case ==
Houck ruled in 1993 that The Citadel must admit women to the Corps of Cadets. Shannon Faulkner was the plaintiff in that case.

== Sources ==
Legal offices
Preceded by Seat established by 92 Stat. 1629	Judge of the United States District Court for the District of South Carolina; 1979–2003	Succeeded by Robert Bryan Harwell
Preceded by Falcon Black Hawkins Jr.	Chief Judge of the United States District Court for the District of South Carolina; 1993–2000	Succeeded by Joseph F. Anderson
