= Bruce Howe Hendricks =

American judge (born 1957)

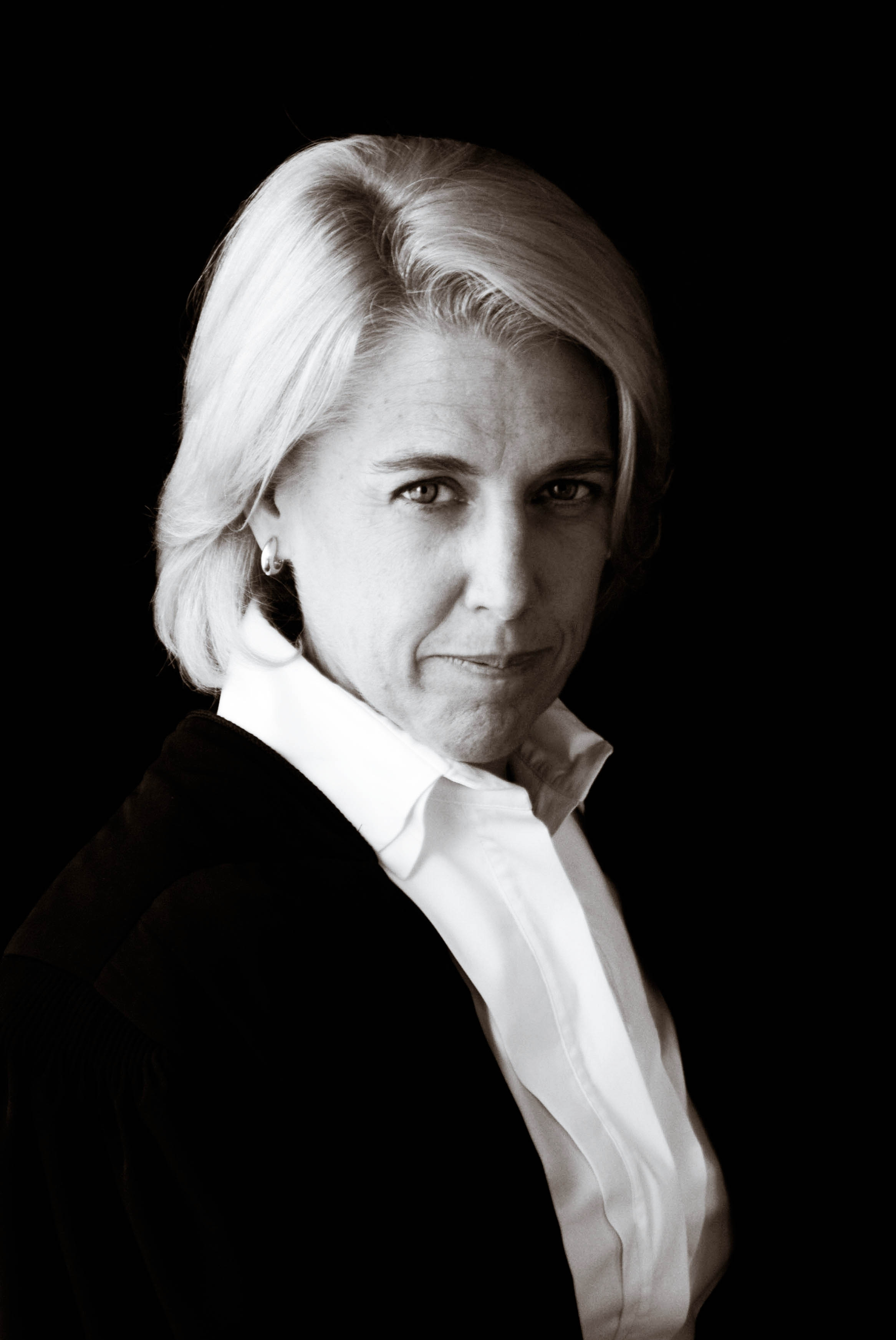

Judge of the United States District Court for the District of South Carolina
- Incumbent
- Assumed office June 5, 2014
- Appointed by: Barack Obama
- Preceded by: Margaret B. Seymour

Magistrate Judge of the United States District Court for the District of South Carolina
- In office 2002 – June 5, 2014

Personal details
- Pronunciation: /bruːsi/
- Born: Bruce McCaw Howe; 1957 (age 68–69) Charleston, South Carolina, U.S.
- Spouse: Ted Hendricks
- Children: 2
- Education: College of Charleston (BS); University of South Carolina (JD)

Bruce McCaw Howe Hendricks /bruːsi/ (born 1957) is a United States district judge of the United States District Court for the District of South Carolina and former United States magistrate judge of the same court.

== Biography ==
Hendricks was born Bruce McCaw Howe in 1957 in Charleston, South Carolina. Hendricks attended Sweet Briar College where she played basketball. Later she transferred to the College of Charleston and received a Bachelor of Science degree in 1983. She received a Juris Doctor in 1990 from the University of South Carolina School of Law. From 1991 to 2002, she served as an Assistant United States Attorney in Charleston, South Carolina, where she prosecuted a wide array of criminal cases before both the United States District Court for the District of South Carolina and on appeal to the United States Court of Appeals for the Fourth Circuit. From 2002 to 2014, she served as a United States magistrate judge, in Greenville from 2002 to 2010 and in Charleston from 2010 to 2014. As part of her duties, she presided over the first drug court program in the District of South Carolina.

=== Federal judicial service ===
On June 26, 2013, President Barack Obama nominated Hendricks to serve as a United States district judge of the United States District Court for the District of South Carolina, to the seat vacated by Judge Margaret B. Seymour, who assumed senior status on January 16, 2013. She received a hearing before the Senate Judiciary Committee on February 11, 2014. Her nomination was reported out of committee by a 16–2 vote on March 6, 2014. On May 22, 2014, Senate Majority Leader Harry Reid filed for cloture on the nomination. On June 3, 2014, the United States Senate invoked cloture on her nomination by a 59–35 vote. On June 4, 2014, her nomination was confirmed by a 95–0 vote. She received her judicial commission on June 5, 2014.

Legal offices
Preceded by Margaret B. Seymour	Judge of the United States District Court for the District of South Carolina; 2014–present	Incumbent
