= Bryan Stirling =

American lawyer (born 1969)

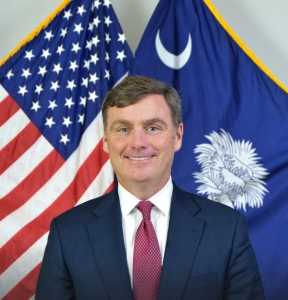
- Official portrait, 2025

United States Attorney for the District of South Carolina
- Incumbent
- Assumed office April 28, 2025; Interim: April 28, 2025 - December 18, 2025
- President: Donald Trump
- Preceded by: Adair Ford Boroughs

Personal details
- Born: Bryan Peter Stirling; October 17, 1969 (age 56) Texas
- Education: University of South Carolina (BA, JD)

Bryan Stirling is an American lawyer serving as the United States attorney for the District of South Carolina since 2025.

== Education ==
Stirling received his bachelor's degree in 1991 and his Juris Doctor degree in 1996 from the University of South Carolina.

== Career ==
=== U.S. attorney for the District of South Carolina ===
On April 28, 2025, Stirling was nominated by President Donald Trump to be the United States attorney for the District of South Carolina. He was appointed by US Attorney General Pamela Bondi, and sworn into office as acting US Attorney on April 28, 2025, by United States Circuit Judge Julius N. Richardson of the United States Court of Appeals for the Fourth Circuit. On December 18, 2025, Stirling's appointment was confirmed by the US Senate, in a 53-43 vote.

During the interim between Stirling's appointment and the firing of his predecessor, Adair Ford Boroughs, in February 2025, Brook Andrews, Boroughs' assistant attorney, served as acting US Attorney.

=== South Carolina Department of Corrections ===
Stirling previously served as head of the South Carolina Department of Corrections since 2013, appointed by Governor Nikki Haley. Prior to that he served as Governor Haley's chief of staff.

=== Deputy state attorney general ===
During Governor Henry McMaster's two terms as attorney general, Stirling served as deputy attorney general.

== Federal cases ==
Stirling spoke briefly to the press after the arraignment of South Carolina legislator RJ May.

Legal offices
Preceded by Adair Ford Boroughs	United States Attorney for the District of South Carolina; 2025-	Succeeded by
