= Edward McCrady =

American politician

Edward McCrady (March 16, 1802 – November 16, 1892) was an American politician.

McCrady, the son of John McCrady, and the grandson of Edward McCrady, an emigrant from County Antrim, Ireland, was born in Charleston, S. C, on March 16, 1802.

McCrady graduated from Yale College in 1820. He began the study of law under the direction of his uncle, Justice William Johnson, of the Supreme Court of the U. S., and completed his course with the Hon. Mitchell King, of Charleston, with whom he practiced law for a short time after his admission to the bar in 1824. He was prominent in his opposition to nullification in 1832-3, and subsequently accepted and filled the office of U.S. District Attorney (until his resignation in 1850), in order to identify himself more distinctly with the policy of the Southern Rights Association, which favored cooperation of Southern Conservatives, but not secession. He was also elected to the South Carolina Legislature, where he served for several years. As a member of the Convention of 1860 he voted for secession, believing that that movement could no longer be delayed without anarchy resulting at home. His last public service was as a member of the Legislature in 1864 and 1865

He continued in active practice until long past 80. He held an equally high rank in the councils of the Episcopal church. For fifty years he represented St. Philip's, the motherchurch of the diocese, in the Diocesan Convention; for forty years he was a member of the standing committee of the diocese, and for over thirty years a deputy to the General Convention

After an illness of some months he died at his house in Charleston on November 16, 1892, in his 91st year. He had been since 1889 the last survivor of the Yale Class of 1820, and since June 1891, the oldest living graduate of Yale.

He married in 1829 Louisa Rebecca, the daughter of Robert Lane, an English merchant who had settled in Charleston. His four daughters and two of his four sons survived him; his eldest son died in 1881, and his third son in 1882.

This article incorporates public domain material from the 1893 Yale Obituary Record.
