= Patrick Michael Duffy =

American judge (born 1943)

Senior Judge of the United States District Court for the District of South Carolina
- In office December 27, 2009 – April 1, 2019

Judge of the United States District Court for the District of South Carolina
- In office December 26, 1995 – December 27, 2009
- Appointed by: Bill Clinton
- Preceded by: Matthew J. Perry
- Succeeded by: Timothy M. Cain

Personal details
- Born: April 8, 1943 (age 83) Charleston, South Carolina
- Education: The Citadel (BA); University of South Carolina Law Center (JD)

Patrick Michael Duffy (born April 8, 1943) is a former United States district judge of the United States District Court for the District of South Carolina.

== Education and career ==
Born in Charleston, South Carolina, Duffy received a Bachelor of Arts degree from The Citadel in 1965 and a Juris Doctor from the University of South Carolina Law Center in 1968. He was a staff attorney of Neighborhood Legal Assistance Office from 1968 to 1969, and then served as a Military Police officer in the United States Army from 1969 to 1971. He then entered private practice in Charleston until 1995, and was also an assistant county attorney of Charleston from 1973 to 1974.

== Federal judicial service ==
On October 11, 1995, Duffy was nominated by President Bill Clinton to a seat on the United States District Court for the District of South Carolina vacated by Matthew J. Perry. Duffy was confirmed by the United States Senate on December 22, 1995, and received his commission on December 26, 1995. He took senior status on December 27, 2009 and was succeeded by Timothy M. Cain. He retired from active service on April 1, 2019.

Legal offices
Preceded by Matthew J. Perry	Judge of the United States District Court for the District of South Carolina; 1995–2009	Succeeded by Timothy M. Cain
