= Robert Bryan Harwell =

American judge (born 1959)

Senior Judge of the United States District Court for the District of South Carolina
- Incumbent
- Assumed office June 4, 2024

Chief Judge of the United States District Court for the District of South Carolina
- In office February 28, 2019 – June 4, 2024
- Preceded by: Terry L. Wooten
- Succeeded by: Timothy M. Cain

Judge of the United States District Court for the District of South Carolina
- In office June 30, 2004 – June 4, 2024
- Appointed by: George W. Bush
- Preceded by: Charles Weston Houck
- Succeeded by: Sheria Clarke

Personal details
- Born: Robert Bryan Harwell; June 4, 1959 (age 67) Florence, South Carolina, U.S.
- Education: Clemson University (BA); University of South Carolina (JD)

Robert Bryan Harwell (born June 4, 1959) is a senior United States district judge of the United States District Court for the District of South Carolina.

== Education and career ==
Harwell was born in Florence, South Carolina. He received a Bachelor of Arts degree from Clemson University in 1980 and a Juris Doctor from the University of South Carolina School of Law in 1982. He was in the South Carolina Army National Guard from 1987 to 1992, and was a law clerk to Judge G. Rodney Peeples of the South Carolina Judicial Department in 1983, and to Judge G. Ross Anderson of the United States District Court for the District of South Carolina from 1983 to 1984. He was in private practice in Florence from 1984 to 2004.

=== Federal judicial service ===
On January 20, 2004, Harwell was nominated by President George W. Bush to a seat on the United States District Court for the District of South Carolina vacated by Charles Weston Houck. Harwell was confirmed by the United States Senate on June 24, 2004, and received his commission on June 30, 2004. He served Chief Judge from February 28, 2019 to June 4, 2024 when he assumed senior status.

== Sources ==
Legal offices
Preceded by Charles Weston Houck	Judge of the United States District Court for the District of South Carolina; 2004–2024	Succeeded by Sheria Clarke
Preceded by Terry L. Wooten	Chief Judge of the United States District Court for the District of South Carolina; 2019–2024	Succeeded by Timothy M. Cain
