= Richard Gergel =

American judge (born 1954)

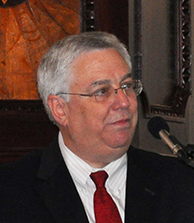

Judge of the United States District Court for the District of South Carolina
- Incumbent
- Assumed office August 9, 2010
- Appointed by: Barack Obama
- Preceded by: Henry Michael Herlong Jr.

Personal details
- Born: Richard Mark Gergel; August 14, 1954 (age 71) Columbia, South Carolina
- Spouse: Belinda Gergel
- Education: Duke University (BA, JD)

Richard Mark Gergel (born August 14, 1954) is an American lawyer who serves as a United States district judge of the United States District Court for the District of South Carolina.

== Early life and education ==
Gergel was born in Columbia, South Carolina, to Melvin and Meri (née Friedman) Gergel, who were both children of Jewish immigrants. Gergel earned a Bachelor of Arts degree from Duke University in 1975 and a Juris Doctor from Duke University School of Law in 1979. Gergel's cousin was well-known industrial chemist Max Gergel, President/CEO of the Columbia Organic Chemical Company, or COCC.

== Professional career ==
From 1979 until 1980, Gergel served as a law clerk for a law firm in Columbia, South Carolina, and he was a partner with the firm from 1981 until 1982. Beginning in 1983 and continuing until his nomination to the district court, he was the president and partner with his own law firm (most recently known as Gergel, Nickles and Solomon) in Columbia. He has specialized in personal injury law.

=== Notable case ===
In 1994, Gergel was the attorney representing the South Carolina Education Association and public school teacher Maggi Smith Hall. The case went to the Fourth Circuit Court of Appeals in Richmond, VA, and was considered one of the most important First Amendment cases to come down from the 4th Circuit in over a decade. At the time, the 4th Circuit was also considered to be the most conservative court in the nation. (Laura Sullivan, Baltimore Sun, November 18, 2003)

The case, Hall v. Marion School District 2, 31 F.3d 183 (4th Cir. 1994), upheld the lower court's decision that Mullins District 2 acted illegally in firing Hall for exercising free speech in criticizing her superintendent and school board for reckless spending.

=== Federal judicial service ===
On December 22, 2009, President Barack Obama nominated Gergel to serve on the United States District Court for the District of South Carolina to fill the seat vacated by Judge Henry Michael Herlong, Jr., who assumed senior status on June 1, 2009. In his questionnaire to the United States Senate Committee on the Judiciary, Gergel wrote that South Carolina Democratic Congressmen John M. Spratt, Jr. and Jim Clyburn both previously had recommended Gergel to Obama as a district court nominee, and that South Carolina Republican Sen. Lindsey Graham also supported the nomination. Gergel had a hearing before the United States Senate Committee on the Judiciary on April 16, 2010. He was confirmed by the United States Senate on August 5, 2010, and received commission on August 9, 2010.

==== Trial of Dylann Roof ====
Gergel was the presiding judge on the trial of Dylann Roof, who was convicted of 33 federal charges relating to the 2015 Charleston church shooting. Roof was convicted on all charges and controversially represented himself during the sentencing phase despite Gergel warning Roof it was not in his best interests to do so. On January 11, 2017, Gergel sentenced Dylann Roof to death after the jury recommended the death penalty the previous day.

== Author ==
Gergel is the author of Unexampled Courage: The Blinding of Sgt. Isaac Woodard and the Awakening of President Harry S. Truman and Judge J. Waties Waring (Farrar, Straus and Giroux, 2019) and, with Belinda Gergel, of In Pursuit of the Tree of Life: A History of the Early Jews of Columbia, South Carolina (1996).

Legal offices
Preceded by Henry Michael Herlong, Jr.	Judge of the United States District Court for the District of South Carolina; 2010–present	Incumbent
