= United States District Court for the District of South Carolina =

United States federal district court of South Carolina

Coordinates: 32.77626°N 79.931763°W

- (D.S.C.)

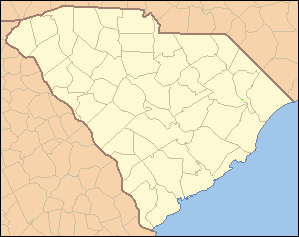
- Location: Charleston More locations: Columbia; C.F. Haynsworth Federal Building and U.S. Courthouse (Greenville); Spartanburg; Charles E. Simons Jr. Federal Court House (Aiken); Anderson; Florence; Orangeburg; Rock Hill; Greenwood; Beaufort
- Appeals to: Fourth Circuit
- Established: October 7, 1965
- Judges: 10
- Chief Judge: Sherri Lydon

Officers of the court
- U.S. Attorney: Bryan Stirling
- U.S. Marshal: Chrissie C. Latimore
- www.scd.uscourts.gov

The United States District Court for the District of South Carolina (in case citations, D.S.C.) is the federal district court whose jurisdiction is the state of South Carolina. Court is held in the cities of Aiken, Anderson, Beaufort, Charleston, Columbia, Florence, Greenville, and Spartanburg.

Appeals from the District of South Carolina are taken to the United States Court of Appeals for the Fourth Circuit (except for patent claims and claims against the U.S. government under the Tucker Act, which are appealed to the Federal Circuit).

The United States attorney for the District of South Carolina represents the United States in civil and criminal litigation in the court. As of April 28, 2025, the acting United States attorney is Bryan Stirling.

== History ==
The District of South Carolina was one of the original 13 courts established by the Judiciary Act of 1789, 1 Stat. 73, on September 24, 1789. It was subdivided into the United States District Court for the Eastern District of South Carolina and the United States District Court for the Western District of South Carolina Districts on February 21, 1823, by 3 Stat. 726. The Eastern District was headquartered at Florence, and the Western District was headquartered in Greenville. The division was solely for the purposes of holding court – a single judge presided over both districts, and the act authorized no additional court staff.

In 1898 the United States Supreme Court held in Barrett v. United States that South Carolina legally constituted a single judicial district. Congress made another effort to subdivide the District on March 3, 1911, by 36 Stat. 1087 and 36 Stat. 1123. South Carolina was again split into Eastern and the Western Districts, with one judgeship authorized to serve both districts, effective January 1, 1912. Congress finally authorized an additional judgeship for the Western District, and assigned the sitting judge exclusively to the Eastern District, on March 3, 1915, by 38 Stat. 961. However, on October 7, 1965, by 79 Stat. 951, South Carolina was reorganized as a single judicial district with four judgeships authorized for the district court. It has since remained a single District.

== Current judges ==
As of October 1, 2026:

#	Title	Judge	Duty station	Born	Term of service			Appointed by
#	Title	Judge	Duty station	Born	Active	Chief	Senior	Appointed by
43	Chief Judge	Sherri Lydon	Columbia	1962	2019–present	2026–present	—	Trump
26	District Judge	David C. Norton	Charleston	1946	1990–present	2007–2012	—	G.H.W. Bush
36	District Judge	Richard Gergel	Charleston	1954	2010–present	—	—	Obama
39	District Judge	Mary Geiger Lewis	Columbia	1958	2012–present	—	—	Obama
40	District Judge	Bruce Howe Hendricks	Charleston	1957	2014–present	—	—	Obama
41	District Judge	Donald C. Coggins Jr.	Spartanburg	1959	2017–present	—	—	Trump
44	District Judge	Joseph Dawson III	Florence	1970	2020–present	—	—	Trump
45	District Judge	Jacquelyn D. Austin	Greenville	1966	2024–present	—	—	Biden
46	District Judge	Sheria Clarke	Columbia	1981	2026–present	—	—	Trump
47	District Judge	vacant	—	—	—	—	—	—
25	Senior Judge	Joseph F. Anderson	Columbia	1949	1986–2014	2000–2007	2014–present	Reagan
28	Senior Judge	Henry Michael Herlong Jr.	Greenville	1944	1991–2009	—	2009–present	G.H.W. Bush
30	Senior Judge	Cameron McGowan Currie	Columbia	1948	1994–2013	—	2013–present	Clinton
33	Senior Judge	Terry L. Wooten	Columbia	1954	2001–2019	2013–2019	2019–present	G.W. Bush
35	Senior Judge	Robert Bryan Harwell	Florence	1959	2004–2024	2019–2024	2024–present	G.W. Bush
38	Senior Judge	Timothy M. Cain	Anderson	1961	2011–2026	2024–2026	2026–present	Obama

== Vacancies and pending nominations ==
Seat	Prior judge's duty station	Seat last held by	Vacancy reason	Date of vacancy	Nominee	Date of nomination
7	Anderson	Timothy M. Cain	Senior status	October 1, 2026	William Grayson Lambert	November 16, 2026

== Former judges ==
#	Judge	Born–died	Active service	Chief Judge	Senior status	Appointed by	Reason for termination
1	William Drayton Sr.	1732–1790	1789–1790	—	—	Washington	death
2	Thomas Bee	1739–1812	1790–1812	—	—	Washington	death
3	John Drayton	1766–1822	1812–1822	—	—	Madison	death
4	Thomas Lee	1769–1839	1823–1839	—	—	Monroe	death
5	Robert Budd Gilchrist	1796–1856	1839–1856	—	—	Van Buren	death
6	Andrew Gordon Magrath	1813–1893	1856–1860	—	—	Pierce	resignation
7	George Seabrook Bryan	1809–1905	1866–1886	—	—	A. Johnson	retirement
8	Charles Henry Simonton	1829–1904	1886–1893	—	—	Cleveland	elevation
9	William H. Brawley	1841–1916	1894–1911	—	—	Cleveland	retirement
10	Henry Smith	1853–1924	1911–1912	—	—	Taft	reassignment
—	George Timmerman Sr.	1881–1966	—	—	1965–1966	F. Roosevelt/Operation of law	death
—	Julius Waties Waring	1880–1968	—	—	1965–1968	F. Roosevelt/Operation of law	death
11	Charles Cecil Wyche	1885–1966	1965–1966	—	—	F. Roosevelt/Operation of law	death
12	James Robert Martin Jr.	1909–1984	1965–1979	1965–1979	1979–1984	Kennedy/Operation of law	death
13	Robert W. Hemphill	1915–1983	1965–1980	1979–1980	1980–1983	L. Johnson/Operation of law	death
14	Charles Earl Simons Jr.	1916–1999	1965–1986	1980–1986	1986–1999	L. Johnson/Operation of law	death
15	Donald S. Russell	1906–1998	1966–1971	—	—	L. Johnson	elevation
16	Robert F. Chapman	1926–2018	1971–1981	—	—	Nixon	elevation
17	Solomon Blatt Jr.	1921–2016	1971–1990	1986–1990	1990–2016	Nixon	death
18	Matthew J. Perry	1921–2011	1979–1995	—	1995–2011	Carter	death
19	Falcon Black Hawkins Jr.	1927–2005	1979–1993	1990–1993	1993–2005	Carter	death
20	Charles Weston Houck	1933–2017	1979–2003	1993–2000	2003–2017	Carter	death
21	G. Ross Anderson	1929–2020	1980–2009	—	2009–2016	Carter	retirement
22	William Walter Wilkins	1942–present	1981–1986	—	—	Reagan	elevation
23	Clyde H. Hamilton	1934–2020	1981–1991	—	—	Reagan	elevation
24	Karen L. Henderson	1944–present	1986–1990	—	—	Reagan	elevation
27	Dennis Shedd	1953–present	1990–2002	—	—	G.H.W. Bush	elevation
29	William Byrd Traxler Jr.	1948–present	1992–1998	—	—	G.H.W. Bush	elevation
31	Patrick Michael Duffy	1943–present	1995–2009	—	2009–2019	Clinton	retirement
32	Margaret B. Seymour	1947–present	1998–2013	2012–2013	2013–2022	Clinton	retirement
34	Henry F. Floyd	1947–present	2003–2011	—	—	G.W. Bush	elevation
37	J. Michelle Childs	1966–present	2010–2022	—	—	Obama	elevation
42	A. Marvin Quattlebaum Jr.	1964–present	2018	—	—	Trump	elevation

== Chief judges ==
Chief judges have administrative responsibilities with respect to their district court. Unlike the Supreme Court, where one justice is specifically nominated to be chief, the office of chief judge rotates among the district court judges. To be chief, a judge must have been in active service on the court for at least one year, be under the age of 65, and have not previously served as chief judge.

A vacancy is filled by the judge highest in seniority among the group of qualified judges. The chief judge serves for a term of seven years, or until age 70, whichever occurs first. The age restrictions are waived if no members of the court would otherwise be qualified for the position.

When the office was created in 1948, the chief judge was the longest-serving judge who had not elected to retire, on what has since 1958 been known as senior status, or declined to serve as chief judge. After August 6, 1959, judges could not become or remain chief after turning 70 years old. The current rules have been in operation since October 1, 1982.

== Succession of seats ==
Seat 1
Seat established on September 24, 1789 by 1 Stat. 73
W. Drayton, Sr.	1789–1790
Bee	1790–1812
J. Drayton	1812–1822
Lee	1823–1839
Gilchrist	1840–1856
Magrath	1856–1860
Bryan	1866–1886
Simonton	1887–1893
Brawley	1894–1911
Smith	1911–1912
Seat reassigned to the Eastern and Western Districts on January 1, 1912 by 36 Stat. 1087, 1123

Seat 2
Seat reassigned from the Eastern and Western Districts on November 1, 1965 by 79 Stat. 951
Martin, Jr.	1965–1979
G. Anderson, Jr.	1980–2009
Childs	2010–2022
Austin	2024–present

Seat 3
Seat reassigned from the Eastern and Western Districts on November 1, 1965 by 79 Stat. 951
Hemphill	1965–1980
Wilkins	1981–1986
Henderson	1986–1990
Shedd	1990–2002
Floyd	2003–2011
Lewis	2012–present

Seat 4
Seat reassigned from the Eastern District on November 1, 1965 by 79 Stat. 951
Simons, Jr.	1965–1986
J. Anderson, Jr.	1986–2014
Coggins, Jr.	2017–present

Seat 5
Seat reassigned from the Western District on November 1, 1965 by 79 Stat. 951
Wyche	1965–1966
Russell	1966–1971
Blatt, Jr.	1971–1990
Norton	1990–present

Seat 6
Seat established on June 2, 1970 by 84 Stat. 294
Chapman	1971–1981
Hamilton	1981–1991
Traxler, Jr.	1992–1998
Seymour	1998–2013
Hendricks	2014–present

Seat 7
Seat established on October 20, 1978 by 92 Stat. 1629
Perry, Jr.	1979–1995
Duffy	1995–2009
Cain	2011–2026
vacant	2026–present

Seat 8
Seat established on October 20, 1978 by 92 Stat. 1629
Hawkins, Jr.	1979–1993
Currie	1994–2013
Quattlebaum, Jr.	2018
Lydon	2019–present

Seat 9
Seat established on October 20, 1978 by 92 Stat. 1629
Houck	1979–2003
Harwell	2004–2024
Clarke	2026–present

Seat 10
Seat established on December 1, 1990 by 104 Stat. 5089
Herlong, Jr.	1991–2009
Gergel	2010–present

Seat 11
Seat established on December 21, 2000 by 114 Stat. 2762
Wooten	2001–2019
Dawson III	2020–present

== List of past U.S. Attorneys ==
The U.S. Attorney for South Carolina is the chief law enforcement officer for the United States District Court for the District of South Carolina. Between 1918 and 1968, the district was separated into western and eastern districts of South Carolina and then reunited.

- John J. Pringle (1789–1792)
- Thomas Parker (1792–1820)
- Robert Y. Haynes (1820)
- John Gadsden (1820–1831)
- Edward Frost (1831)
- Robert B. Gilchrist (1831–1840)
- Edward McCrady (1840–1850)
- William Whaley (1850)
- James L. Petigru (1850–1853)
- Thomas Evans (1853–1856)
- James Conner (1856–1860)
- John Phillips (1866–1867)
- David T. Corbin (1867–1877)
- L. C. Northrup (1878–1881)
- Samuel W. Melton (1881–1885)
- Leroy F. Youmans (1885–1893)
- Abial Lathrop (1889–1893)
- William P. Murphy (1893–1896)
- Abial Lathrop (1896–1901)
- John G. Capers (1901–1906)
- Ernest F. Cochran (1906–1914)
- Francis H. Weston (1914–1918)
- Klyde Robinson (1968–1969)
- Joseph O. Rogers Jr. (1969–1971)
- John K. Grisso (1971–1975)
- Thomas P. Simpson (1975)
- Mark W. Buyck Jr. (1975–1977)
- Thomas P. Simpson (1977)
- Thomas E. Lydon Jr. (1977–1981)
- Henry D. McMaster (1981–1985)
- Vinton D. Lide (1985–1989)
- E. Bart Daniel (1989–1992)
- John S. Simmons (1992–1993)
- Pete Strom (1993–1996)
- J. René Josey (1996–2001)
- J. Strom Thurmond Jr. (2001–2005)
- Reginald I. Lloyd (2005–2008)
- Walt Wilkins III (2008–2010)
- Bill Nettles (2010–2016)
- Sherri Lydon (2018–2019)
- Peter M. McCoy Jr. (2020–2021)
- Adair Ford Boroughs (2022–2025)
- Brook B. Andrews (2025)
- Bryan Stirling (2025-)

== See also ==
- Courts of South Carolina
- List of current United States district judges
- List of United States federal courthouses in South Carolina
