= Joseph F. Rice School of Law =

Law school of the University of South Carolina

Coordinates: 34.00280°N 81.0278°W

University of South Carolina Joseph F. Rice School of Law
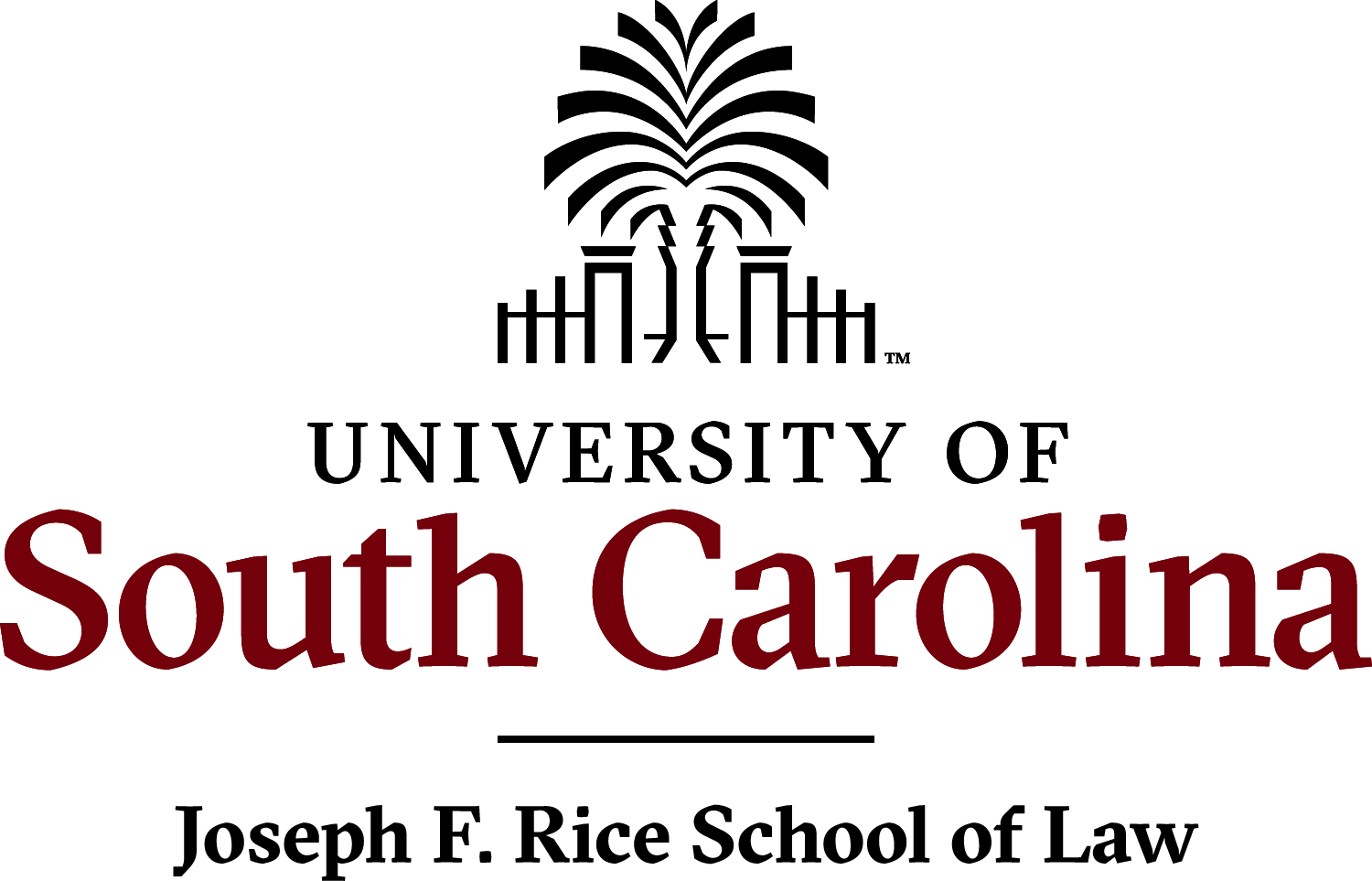
- Parent school: University of South Carolina
- Established: 1867; 159 years ago
- School type: Public law school
- Endowment: $80.4 million
- Parent endowment: $425.2 million
- Dean: William C. Hubbard
- Location: Columbia, SC, US
- Enrollment: 628 (2024)
- Faculty: 136 (2023)
- USNWR ranking: 62nd (tie) (2026)
- Website: law.sc.edu
- ABA profile: SC Law Profile

The University of South Carolina Joseph F. Rice School of Law, also known as South Carolina Law School, is a professional school within the University of South Carolina. Founded in 1867, it is the only public and non-profit law school in South Carolina. It has been accredited by the American Bar Association since 1925 and a member of the Association of American Law Schools since 1924.

First-year law students average around 200 students from 29 states. Fifty-five percent of the students were from South Carolina, and minority students made up twenty percent of the class. Fifty-three percent of incoming students were female, while forty-seven percent were male.

On November 10, 2023, the school was renamed as the University of South Carolina Joseph F. Rice School of Law after alumnus plaintiffs attorney Joseph F. Rice of Motley Rice LLC.

== History ==
The discussion on starting a law program began as early as 1810 when President Jonathan Maxcy recommended to the board of trustees of South Carolina College that the school establish a professorship of law. A resolution of the statehouse in 1823 requested the college to consider "the propriety and advantage of establishing a Professorship of Law in that institution, and to report to this house, at the next session, the manner in which such a Professorship may be established, so as to be most advantageous to the community, and least expensive to the State." The trustees replied that a professor should be hired, but that the courses should be offered only to graduates.

When the University of South Carolina was formed from South Carolina College in December 1865, the act doing so also authorized the trustees to hire one or more persons to form classes to instruct on law under such terms as the trustees should decide. In 1866, the act was amended to require the trustees to do so on the quickest possible terms.

In January 1867, the trustees offered Chancellor J.A. Inglis the position, but he declined. In 1868, the offer was next made to Col. A.C. Haskell who accepted and held the post until August 1868. The course of study included the various branches of common law and equity, commercial, international, and constitutional law. Although the program was meant to cover two years, many students completed it in one. A moot court was also overseen by the professor to train students in the details of actual practice. Four students started in the program, and two graduated in June 1868.

The program lapsed during the 1868–1869 academic year, but resumed the following term under the direction of the Hon. C.D. Melton. The program continued until it was shut following the death of a subsequent professor, Chief Justice Franklin J. Moses, in 1877.

During the Reconstruction Era (1868-1876), the law school graduated thirty-nine students. Eleven of these graduates were African-American.

The school resumed in 1884 under Col. Joseph Daniel Pope with a two-year program that again was often completed in one. Professor Pope was given a small salary and the fees generated from tuition. Special provision was made for the teaching of short courses by leading members of the bar. The school also added minimum entrance standards at that time: An applicant had to be at least nineteen years old, have a good English education, and known enough Latin to readily understand legal terms and maxims. Juniors were instructed in the following subjects: "Organization and Jurisdiction of Courts of United States (Supreme, Circuit, and District Courts) and South Carolina (Supreme, Common Pleas, Sessions, Probate, and Trial Justice Courts); Sources of Municipal Law; Domestic Relations; Personal Property, and title to same; Administration, Wills, Contracts, Bailments, Bills and Notes, Principal and Agent, Corporations; Criminal Law, and herein of Torts and nuisances; Public and Private Law, Law of Evidence." Seniors were instructed in the following: "Pleadings and Practice; Law of Real Property; Equity Jurisprudence; Law of Conveyancing; Trial of Title to Land; Maritime Law and Law of Nations; State of Law of the State on subjects not read with the text and lectures of the course; Deeds, Recording, Habeas Corpus, etc." In addition, the juniors were required to write essays, while seniors were trained in court details in a moot court.

In 1918, Claudia James Sullivan became the first female graduate of the law school. During the 1920s, the school continued to modernize under the American Bar Association's guidelines for law schools. In 1964, the school of law was Integrated and in 1967 Jasper Cureton became the first African-American graduate of the law school since Reconstruction.

== Facilities ==
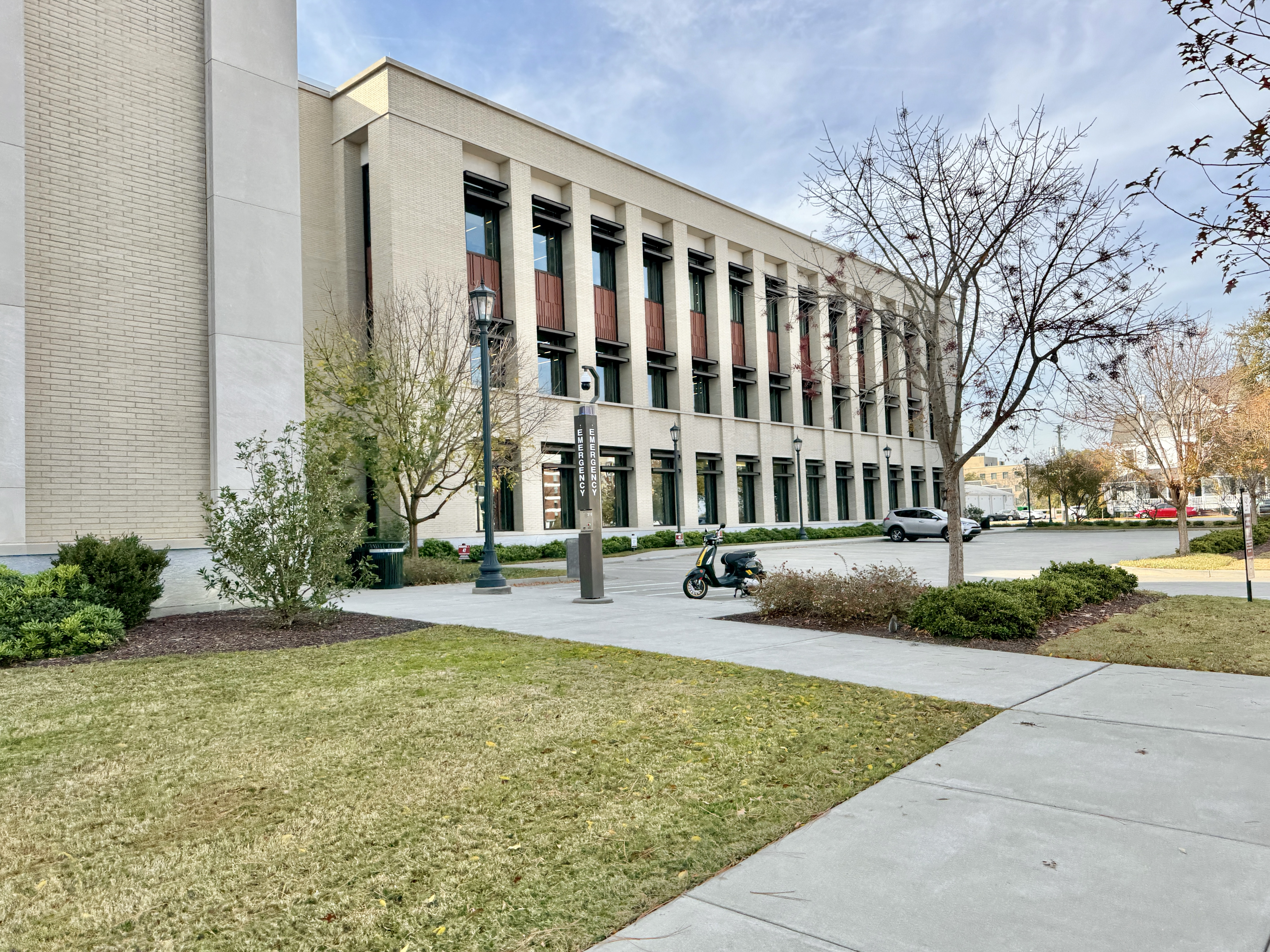
The Joseph F. Rice School of Law building

From its opening in 1867 until 1875, the law school held classes in what now are the South Caroliniana Library and DeSaussure College. In 1891, the Law Department was moved to Legare College. From 1919 to 1950, the law school was located in Petigru College (in 1950, renamed to Currell College). From 1950 to 1974, the law school was located in the new Petigru College. From 1974 to 2017, the law school was located in the University of South Carolina Law Center at 701 Main Street.

On July 27, 2011, the law school officially announced plans for a new building, to be located on a block between Senate, Gervais, Bull and Pickens streets in downtown Columbia. In February 2013, the university's board of trustees voted to pay more than half of the $80 million cost of the 187,500 square foot building with bonds backed by students' tuition payments. The new building opened in June 2017, with space to accommodate over 660 students with instructional spaces including 17 classrooms ranging from 20 to 95 seats, a ceremonial courtroom, and law library. It also houses faculty areas, legal clinics, and student journals and organization spaces. Featuring the Karen J. Williams Courtroom, named for a late USC law school alumna who became the first female chief judge at the Fourth Circuit Court of Appeals, the 300-seat ceremonial courtroom periodically hosts U.S. Court of Appeals sessions and also serve as an auditorium as well as large classroom. The school's law library houses over 500,000 volumes or volume equivalents, making it the largest law library in the state.

== Centers and Programs ==
Centers and programs help to advance the academic, research, and service mission of the Joseph F. Rice School of Law.

== Clinics ==
Clinics allow second-semester second-year students and third-year students at South Carolina Law to learn the law and the standards of the legal profession by representing actual clients.

- Carolina Health Advocacy Medicolegal Partnership (CHAMPS) Clinic
- Criminal Practice Clinic
- Domestic Violence Clinic
- Educational Rights Clinic
- Nonprofit Organizations Clinic
- Veterans Legal Clinic
- Youth Defender Clinic

== Law Journals ==
The Joseph F. Rice School of Law houses four student-edited law journals. The oldest, the South Carolina Law Review, was founded in 1937, but traces its roots to the 1831 Carolina Bar Journal.

== Employment ==
According to USC School of Law ABA-required disclosures, 89.94% of the Class of 2022 obtained full-time, long-term, JD-required or JD advantage employment 10 months after graduation.

== Costs ==
Tuition for the 2023-2024 academic year for a non-resident is $41,500 and for a resident is $23,722.

== Notable alumni ==
=== Political ===
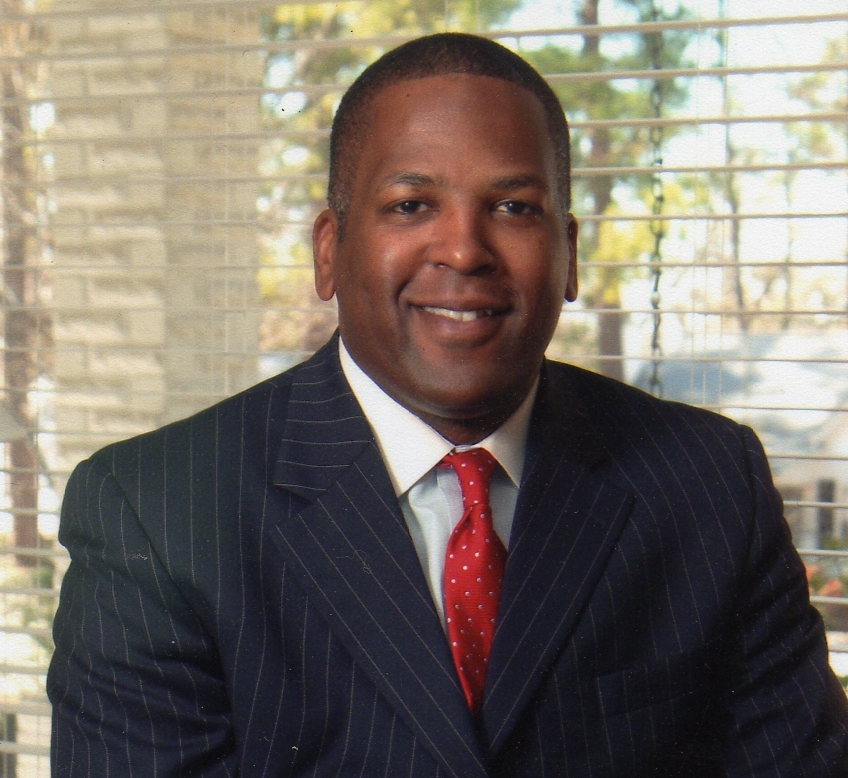
Stephen Benjamin, Senior Advisor to the President

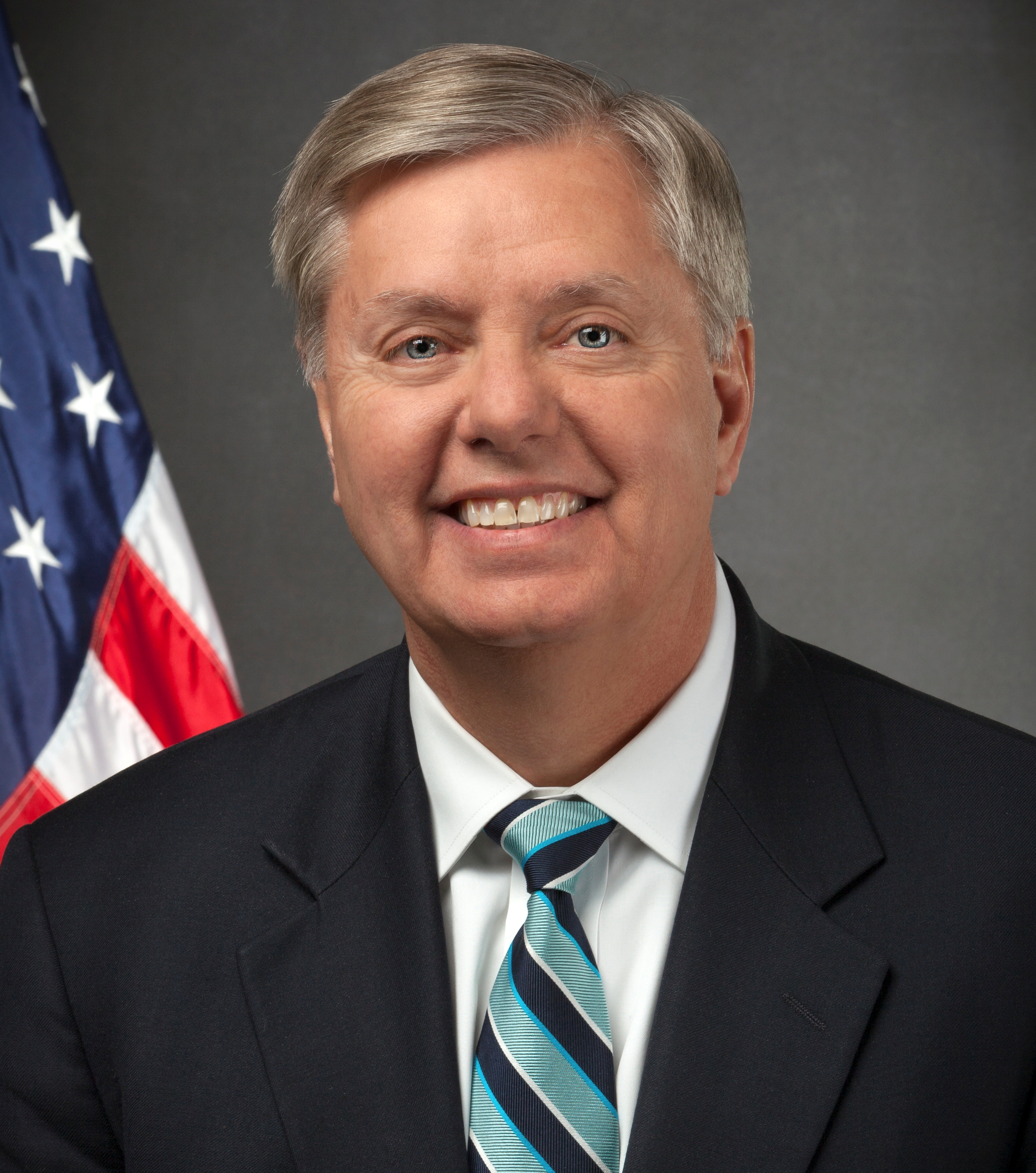
Lindsey Graham, former U.S. Senator

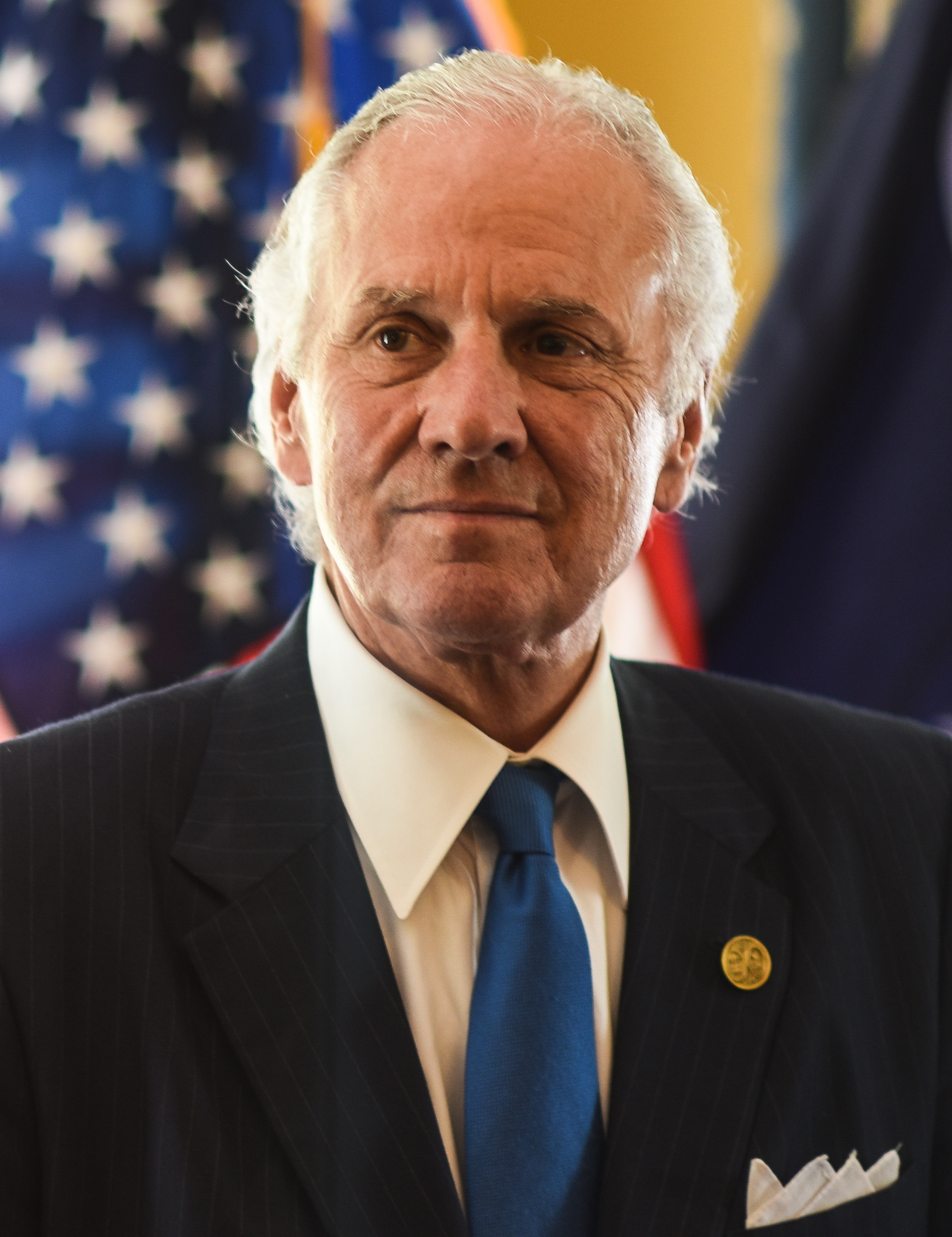
Henry McMaster, Governor of South Carolina

- David Beasley - Former Governor of South Carolina and former executive director of the U.N. World Food Programme
- Stephen K. Benjamin - Senior Advisor to President Joe Biden and former Mayor of Columbia, South Carolina
- Trey Gowdy - Former U.S. Representative for South Carolina's 4th congressional district
- Lindsey Graham - Former United States Senator for South Carolina
- Richard Theodore Greener - Republican Party activist and diplomat
- Van Hipp Jr. - Former South Carolina Republican Party Chairman and Former Deputy Assistant Secretary of the US Army
- Jim Hodges - Former Governor of South Carolina
- Fritz Hollings - Former United States Senator
- Styles Linton Hutchins, legislator in Texas
- Marlon Kimpson, Former South Carolina Senator, Member of the U.S. Advisory Committee for Trade Policy and Negotiations, attorney
- James H. "Jay" Lucas - Speaker of the South Carolina House of Representatives
- Glenn F. McConnell - Former Lieutenant Governor of South Carolina and Former President of the College of Charleston
- Edgar L. McGowan - Former Commissioner of Labor of South Carolina
- Henry McMaster - 117th Governor of South Carolina
- Robert Evander McNair - Former Governor of South Carolina
- Tom Rice - U.S. Representative for South Carolina's 7th Congressional district
- Joseph O. Rogers Jr. - Former Member of the South Carolina House of Representatives
- Floyd Spence - Former U.S. Representative for South Carolina's 2nd congressional district
- William Timmons - U.S. Representative for South Carolina's 4th congressional district
- Alan Wilson - Attorney General of South Carolina
- Joe Wilson - U.S. Representative for South Carolina's 2nd congressional district

=== Judicial ===
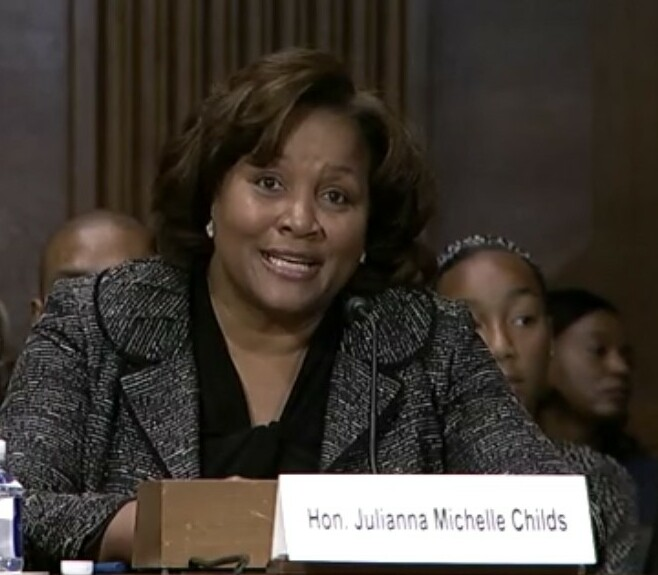
J. Michelle Childs, Judge for the D.C. Circuit Court of Appeals

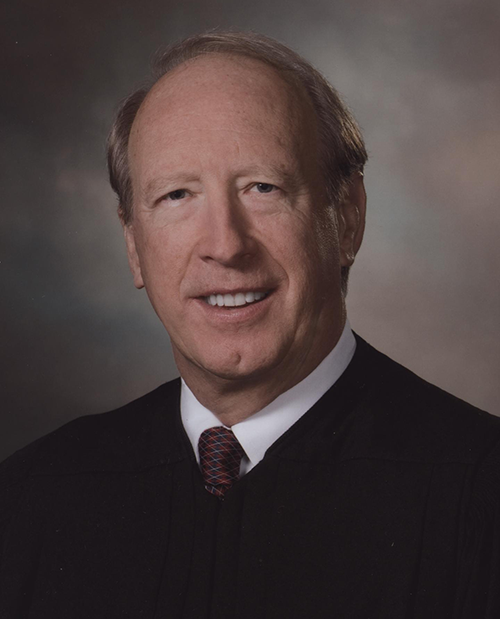
William Byrd Traxler Jr., Senior Judge for the Fourth Circuit Court of Appeals

- Joseph F. Anderson - Senior District Judge for the U.S. District Court of South Carolina
- Donald W. Beatty - Former Chief Justice of the Supreme Court of South Carolina
- William Byrd Traxler Jr. - Senior Judge for the U.S. Court of Appeals for the Fourth Circuit
- Timothy M. Cain - Chief Judge for the U.S. District Court of South Carolina
- J. Michelle Childs - Judge for the U.S. Circuit Court of Appeals for the District of Columbia
- Carol Connor - first female circuit court, appeal court, and supreme court judge in South Carolina
- Patrick Michael Duffy - Senior District Judge for the U.S. District Court of South Carolina
- John Cannon Few - Former Associate Justice of the Supreme Court of South Carolina
- Henry F. Floyd - Senior Judge for the U.S. Court of Appeals for the Fourth Circuit
- Robert Bryan Harwell - Senior District Judge for the U.S. District Court of South Carolina
- Kaye Gorenflo Hearn - Former Associate Justice of the Supreme Court of South Carolina
- Bruce Howe Hendricks - District Judge for the U.S. District Court of South Carolina
- Henry Michael Herlong, Jr. - Senior District Judge for the U.S. District Court of South Carolina
- D. Garrison Hill - Associate Justice of the Supreme Court of South Carolina
- Charles Weston Houck - Senior District Judge for the U.S. District Court of South Carolina
- David C. Norton - District Judge for the U.S. District Court of South Carolina
- George C. James - Associate Justice of the Supreme Court of South Carolina
- John W. Kittredge - Chief Justice of the South Carolina Supreme Court
- Mary Geiger Lewis - District Judge for the U.S. District Court of South Carolina
- Costa M. Pleicones - Former Chief Justice of the Supreme Court of South Carolina
- Dennis Shedd - Judge for the U.S. Court of Appeals for the Fourth Circuit
- Jean Hoefer Toal - Former Chief Justice of the Supreme Court of South Carolina
- A. Marvin Quattlebaum Jr. — Judge for the U.S. Court of Appeals for the Fourth Circuit
- Terry L. Wooten - Senior Judge for the U.S. District Court of South Carolina
- Letitia H. Verdin - Associate Justice of the Supreme Court of South Carolina

=== Individuals ===
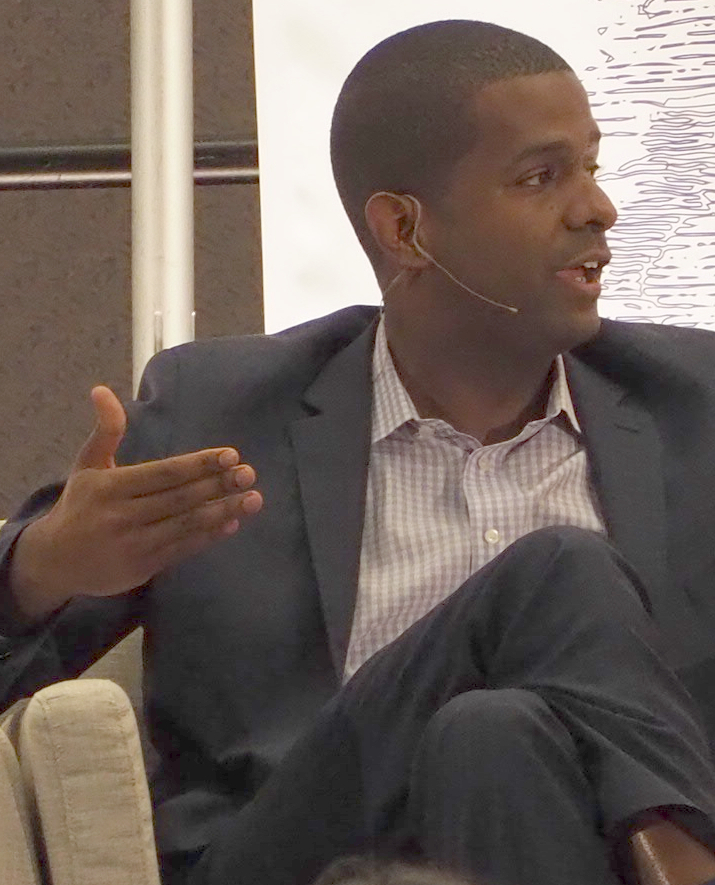
Bakari Sellers, CNN Commentator

- David Bruck - Noted capital defense attorney and Supreme Court advocate
- Judy Clarke - Noted criminal defense attorney for Ted Kaczynski, Zacarias Moussaoui, Susan Smith, Eric Rudolph, Jared Lee Loughner, and Dzhokhar Tsarnaev
- Terrell L. Glenn Sr. - U.S. Attorney for South Carolina under John F. Kennedy and Lyndon B. Johnson
- Melvin Purvis - American law enforcement official and Federal Bureau of Investigation (FBI) agent
- Bakari Sellers - Attorney, political commentator, and politician who served in the South Carolina House of Representatives

== Admissions ==
	1996	1999	2000	2001	2003	2004	2006	2008	2009	2010	2011	2012	2013	2014	2015	2016
Applications	N/A	N/A	N/A	N/A	N/A	1612	1609	2082	1975	2191	1972	1771	1445	1248	1245	1272
Accepted	N/A	N/A	N/A	N/A	N/A	478 (30%)	500 (31%)	729 (35%)	N/A	N/A	N/A	N/A	N/A	N/A	713 (57.3%)	N/A
Enrolled	250	218	225	N/A	225	240	225	229	240	240	213	213	208	215	213	209
75% LSAT/GPA	N/A	158/3.56	159/3.55	159/3.58	159/3.55	N/A	161/3.70	160/3.7	160/3.70	161/3.64	160/3.63	159/3.58	158/3.54	157/3.54	157/3.54	157/3.63
Median LSAT/GPA	157/3.2	155/3.22	156/3.28	156/3.28	156/3.28	158/3.5	159/3.40	159/3.4	158/3.46	159/3.39	158/3.35	157/3.32	155/3.27	155/3.23	155/3.23	154/3.47
25% LSAT/GPA	N/A	151/2.90	152/3.01	154/3.02	152/3.01	N/A	156/3.10	156/3.05	156/3.14	156/3.04	155/3.07	154/3.01	153/3.05	152/2.95	152/2.95	151/3.17

== South Carolina bar exam passage ==
In South Carolina, the bar exam is administered twice a year—in July and February. July is the primary testing date for those who graduate in May. A much smaller group, generally out-of-state applicants, repeat takers, and December graduates, take the February exam. The Supreme Court of South Carolina did not release the pass rate for specific schools' alumni until the July 2007 exam when the Court separately listed the pass rate for the University of South Carolina and the Charleston School of Law.

	Feb.	July
2007	N/A	91.5%^{*}
2008	64.7%	86.4%
2009	76.3%	84.8%
2010	66.7%	83.8%
2011	69.6%	79.75%
2012	57.8%	76.2%
2013	75.0%	82.5%
2014	62.2%	79.7%
2015	58.3%	80.5%
2016	49.0%	75.6%
2017	47.9%	76.2%
2018	41.9%	76.3%
2019	71.4%	78.0%
2020	46.9%	82.5%
2021	57.1%	81.7%
2022	46.2%	71.2%
2023	33.3%	NA
2024	65.1%	81.5%
2025	43.2%	85.8%
2026	55.2%	NA

^{*} The July 2007 results were revised upwards after the South Carolina Supreme Court threw out a section of the exam because of an error by a bar examiner.

== Sources ==
- Edwin L. Green, A History of the University of South Carolina 236-40 (1916) (on the history of the law school).
