= International Refugee Assistance Project v. Trump =

International Refugee Assistance Project v. Donald J. Trump
- Court: United States Court of Appeals for the Fourth Circuit
- Argued: December 8, 2017
- Decided: February 15, 2018
- Citation: 883 F.3d 233 (4th Cir. 2018)

Case history
- Prior history: Preliminary injunction against Executive Order 13780 affirmed, 857 F.3d 554 (4th Cir. 2018); and preliminary injunction barring enforcement of Section 2 of Proclamation No. 9645, 265 F. Supp. 3d 570 (D. Md. 2017)
- Subsequent history: Vacated on mootness grounds, No. 16-1436, 593 U.S. ___ (October 10, 2017)

Holding
- The preliminary injunction issued by the district court is affirmed.

Court membership
- Judges sitting: Chief Judge Gregory, Judges Niemeyer, Motz, Traxler, King, Agee, Keenan, Wynn, Diaz, Floyd, Thacker, and Harris, and Senior Circuit Judge Shedd

Case opinions
- Majority: Gregory, joined by Motz, King, Keenan, Wynn, Diaz, Floyd, Thacker, and Harris

Laws applied
- U.S. Const. amend. I.
- Superseded by
- Trump v. Hawaii (2018)

International Refugee Assistance Project v. Trump, 883 F. 3d 233 (4th Cir. 2018), was a decision of the United States Court of Appeals for the Fourth Circuit, sitting en banc, upholding an injunction against enforcement of Proclamation No. 9645, titled "Enhancing Vetting Capabilities and Processes for Detecting Attempted Entry Into the United States by Terrorists or Other Public-Safety Threats", a presidential proclamation signed by President Donald Trump on September 24, 2017. The proclamation indefinitely suspends the entry into the U.S. of some or all immigrant and non-immigrant travelers from eight countries. It is a successor to Executive Order 13769, entitled "Protection of the Nation from Terrorist Entry into the United States," which were also enjoined by the District Court of Maryland and the Fourth Circuit in a case decided in 2017 by the same name of International Refugee Assistance Project v. Trump, 857 F.3d 554 (4th Cir. 2017).

The 2018 case was the result of three separate lawsuits brought in the District Court of Maryland, which were consolidated into one case on appeal. The suing parties were made up of the International Refugee Assistance Project (IRAP); HIAS, Inc.; the Middle East Studies Association (MESA); the Arab-American Association of New York (AAANY); the Yemeni-American Merchants Association (YAMA); Muhammed Meteab; Mohamad Mashta; Grannaz Amirjamshidi; Fakhri Ziaolhagh; Shapour Shirani; and Afsaneh Khazaeli; the Iranian Alliances Across Borders (IAAB); the Iranian Students' Foundation (ISF); Eblal Zakzok; Sumaya Hamadmad; Fahed Muqbil; and several unnamed individuals (John Doe 1, 3, and 5; and Jane Doe 1–6). These groups were represented in argument by the American Civil Liberties Union (ACLU) and the National Immigration Law Center (NILC).

The Fourth Circuit opinion affirming the injunction granted by the district court below was stayed pending the Supreme Court's decision on a petition for a writ of certiorari appealing the circuit court ruling.

Similar cases were proceeding simultaneously in federal district court in Hawaii and the Ninth Circuit Court of Appeals, which ultimately resulted in the Supreme Court decision Trump v. Hawaii 585 U.S. ___ (2018).

== March Executive Order ==
=== U.S. District Courts ===
On March 15, 2017, Judge Theodore Chuang of the United States District Court for the District of Maryland, who was formerly Deputy General Counsel for the United States Department of Homeland Security, concluded that the executive order was likely motivated by anti-Muslim sentiment by taking into account evidence beyond the text of the order itself. The opinion held the executive order to be in breach of the Establishment Clause of the United States Constitution, and the district court issued an injunction barring enforcement of the revised executive order's section 2(c), which would have banned travel to the U.S. by citizens from six designated countries. The case in front of Judge Chuang was argued by Justin Cox of the National Immigration Law Center and Omar Jadwat of the American Civil Liberties Union for the Plaintiffs, and Jeffrey Wall, Acting Solicitor General, for the government.

The basis of Judge Chuang's order is violation of the Establishment Clause of the United States Constitution. Judge Chuang also noted that the order was in violation of the Immigration and Nationality Act of 1965, which modifies the Immigration and Nationality Act of 1952 to say "No person shall receive any preference or priority or be discriminated against in the issuance of an immigrant visa because of his race, sex, nationality, place of birth, or place of residence," but only in that it placed a ban on immigrant visa issuance based on nationality. Judge Chuang noted that the statute does not prohibit the President from barring entry into the United States or the issuance of non-immigrant visas based on nationality.

The Trump Administration appealed the ruling to the United States Court of Appeals for the Fourth Circuit, which scheduled oral argument for May 8.

On March 31 approximately 30 U.S. universities filed an amicus brief with the Fourth Circuit opposing the travel ban.

The Department of Justice stated that it "will continue to defend [the] Executive Order in the courts".

On May 8, acting Solicitor General of the United States Jeffrey Wall and American Civil Liberties Union attorney Omar Jadwat appeared before the 13-judge en banc Fourth Circuit for two hours of oral arguments in Richmond, Virginia's Lewis F. Powell Jr. United States Courthouse. Judges J. Harvie Wilkinson III, whose daughter is married to Wall, and Allyson Kay Duncan recused themselves.

=== United States Court of Appeals ===
On May 25, the Fourth Circuit issued an opinion upholding the March ruling of the Maryland district court, and continuing the block of the travel ban.

Chief Judge Roger Gregory wrote the majority opinion, joined in full by judges Diana Gribbon Motz, Robert Bruce King, James A. Wynn Jr., Albert Diaz, Henry F. Floyd, and Pamela Harris. Judge William Byrd Traxler Jr. concurred in the judgment only, and Judges Barbara Milano Keenan and Stephanie Thacker concurred in substantial part and concurred in the judgment. The majority affirmed the district court's issuance of a nationwide injunction based solely on consideration of the plaintiffs' Establishment Clause claim, without reaching the merits their claims that the executive order also violates the Immigration and Nationality Act (INA) and other statutes. The opinion found that the ban "speaks with vague words of national security, but in context drips with religious intolerance, animus and discrimination". The court examined the order in light of statements made by Trump and his advisers during the 2016 campaign, and before and after Trump's inauguration, proposing action broadly addressed to Muslims, arguing that it was proper to do so because the statements were close in time to the issuance of the order, made by the primary decision-maker responsible for the order, and unambiguous in their discriminatory intent. Some of the statements the Court relied upon in reaching this determination included, but were not limited to, the following:

- In December 2015, Trump published a "Statement on Preventing Muslim Immigration" on his campaign website which urged for "a total and complete shutdown of Muslims entering the United States until our country's representatives can figure out what is going on." International Refugee Assistance Project v. Trump, 857 F.3d 554, 575 (4th Cir. 2017) (internal citations omitted)

- On March 9, 2016, in an interview on CNN, Trump expressed his belief that "Islam hates us." (Ibid.)

- On March 22, 2016, in an interview on Fox News, Trump claimed that a travel ban was necessary because "we're having problems with the Muslims, and we're having problems with Muslims coming into the country...you have to deal with the mosques whether you like it or not." (Ibid.)

- On July 17, 2016, a person tweeted to Trump "Calls to ban Muslims from entering the U.S. are offensive and unconstitutional." Trump responded, "So [we'll] call it territories. Ok? We're gonna do territories." (Ibid.)

- One week later, on Meet the Press, Trump disavowed the well-settled principle that our Constitution provides broad protections to people on the basis of religion by stating that "Our Constitution is great...Now, we have a religious, you know, everybody wants to be protected. And that's great. And that's the wonderful part of our Constitution. I view it differently." (Ibid.)

- On January 28, 2017, former NYC Mayor Rudolph Giuliani explained that, roughly one year earlier, and subsequent to the public backlash from then-candidate Trump's proposed "Muslim ban," Giuliani received a call from Trump asking him to figure out a "way to do it legally." (Id. at 577) Giuliani explained that after assembling a group of attorneys, the consensus was that Trump should not focus on religion, but rather on "areas of the world that create danger for us..." (Ibid.)

After analyzing these statements under the constitutional test outlined in Lemon v. Kurtzman, a landmark 1971 Supreme Court case, the majority found that Executive Order 13780 "cannot be divorced from the cohesive narrative linking it to the animus that inspired it," and that a "reasonable observer would likely conclude that [the order's] primary purpose is to exclude persons from the United States on the basis of their religious beliefs." On that basis, the majority found the plaintiffs would likely succeed on the merits of their Establishment Clause claim. The majority also found the plaintiffs would suffer irreparable harm if the ban was not enjoined, and that the balance of equities and public interest favored the issuance of an injunction blocking the ban.

Judge Traxler wrote a concurring opinion, concurring in the judgment of the majority only to the extent it affirmed the district court's issuance of a nationwide preliminary injunction against Section 2(c) of the second Executive Order, finding that it likely violates the Establishment Clause.

Judge Keenan wrote a concurring opinion, in which Judge Thacker joined in part, concurring in part and concurring in the judgment. Unlike the majority, Judge Keenan considered the merits of plaintiffs' claims under the INA. In Judge Keenan's view, although the plaintiffs would be unlikely to succeed on the merits of their claim under Section 1152(a)(1)(A) of the INA (as codified), their request for injunctive relief was nevertheless supported because Section 2(c) of the second Executive Order was not within the lawful exercise of the president's authority under Section 1182(f) of the INA.

Judges Dennis Shedd, Paul V. Niemeyer and G. Steven Agee all wrote and joined in each other's dissenting opinions. Judge Shedd substantially argued that the majority was wrong to examine statements from the campaign, arguing that such an examination was without precedent, and would open the door to excessive review of candidate rhetoric in interpreting the constitutionality of later actions.

Judges J. Harvie Wilkinson III and Allyson Kay Duncan did not participate due to their earlier recusals.

=== United States Supreme Court ===
Following the release of the Fourth Circuit decision, Attorney General Jeff Sessions announced that the Justice Department would ask the Supreme Court of the United States to review the decision. On June 1, 2017, the Trump administration formally filed its appeal for the cancellation of the restraining order, and requested that the Supreme Court allow the order to go into effect while the court looks at its ultimate legality later in the year.

Jeffery Wall, the acting Solicitor General of the United States applied for a stay of execution from the U.S. Supreme Court, which, after the United States Court of Appeals for the Ninth Circuit also upheld an injunction blocking the travel ban, then scheduled all briefing to be concluded by June 21, the day before the Court's last conference of the term. Hawaii's outside counsel in a consolidated related case, Neal Katyal, told the Court he was "in Utah with very little internet access" for the rest of the week, so it granted him an extra day to file the state's response brief.

On June 26, 2017, in an unsigned per curiam decision, the United States Supreme Court stayed the lower court injunctions as applied to those who have no "credible claim of a bona fide relationship with a person or entity in the United States" The Court also granted certiorari and set oral arguments for the fall term. The Court did not clarify on what constitutes a bona fide relationship. Justices Thomas, joined by Justices Alito and Gorsuch, partially dissented, writing that the lower courts' entire injunctions against the executive order should be stayed.

On June 29, President Trump sent out a diplomatic cable to embassies and consulates seeking to define what qualifies as a "bona fide relationships", excluding connections with refugee resettlement agencies, and clarifying that step-siblings and half-siblings are close family while grandparents and nephews are not.

== September Presidential Proclamation ==
On September 24, 2017, Trump signed a new Presidential Proclamation replacing and expanding the March Executive Order. The Supreme Court canceled its hearing, and Solicitor General Noel Francisco then asked the Court to declare the case moot and also vacate the lower courts' judgments. On October 10, 2017, the Supreme Court did so with regard to the Fourth Circuit case. Justice Sonia Sotomayor dissented, saying the Court should not vacate the judgment below but only dismiss their review as improvidently granted.

=== U.S. District Courts ===
Plaintiffs next amended their complaints to challenge the September Presidential Proclamation. On October 18, 2017, Judge Theodore D. Chuang in Maryland issued a nationwide injunction prohibiting enforcement of the Proclamation against those with a bona fide relationship to the United States on the grounds it violated the United States Constitution.

On December 4, the Supreme Court issued an order allowing the September Proclamation to take effect, blocking all the lower court decisions from taking effect until after the Supreme Court rules on the matter, and encouraging both appeals courts to "render its decision with appropriate dispatch." Justices Ginsburg and Sotomayor voted against the brief, unsigned orders.

=== U.S. Courts of Appeals ===
On February 15, 2018, the en banc Fourth Circuit affirmed the Maryland injunction against the Proclamation by a vote of 9–4. Chief Judge Roger Gregory, writing for the majority, found that the Proclamation likely violated the Establishment Clause of the U.S. Constitution. In his dissent, Judge Paul V. Niemeyer argued that the majority erred by considering comments made by President Trump. Judge William Byrd Traxler Jr., who had joined the circuit majority in May, now dissented. The Circuit Courts' judgments remained stayed by the December 4 Supreme Court order.
