= List of federal judges appointed by George H. W. Bush =

Following is a list of all Article III United States federal judges appointed by President George H. W. Bush during his presidency. All information is derived from the Biographical Directory of Federal Judges, a public-domain publication of the Federal Judicial Center. In total Bush appointed 193 Article III federal judges, including two justices to the Supreme Court of the United States, 42 judges to the United States Courts of Appeals, 148 judges to the United States district courts and one judge to the United States Court of International Trade.

Additionally, eight Article I federal judicial appointments are listed, six to the United States Court of Appeals for Veterans Claims and two to the United States Court of Federal Claims. Other Article I appointments by President Bush are not listed.

Seven of Bush's appointees remain in active service in the roles to which Bush appointed them: Justice Clarence Thomas, four appeals court judges and two district court judges. One district judge and one appellate judge remain in active service on the Supreme Court by appointment of later presidents.

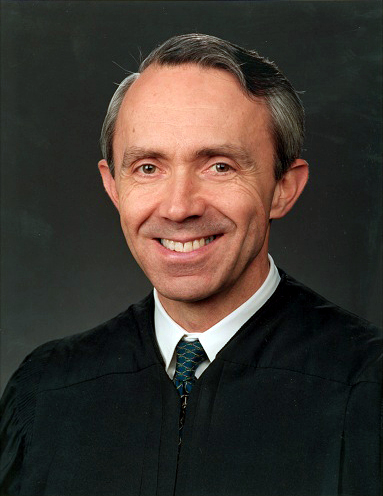
David Souter was Bush's first Supreme Court appointment, having first been appointed by Bush to the United States Court of Appeals for the First Circuit.

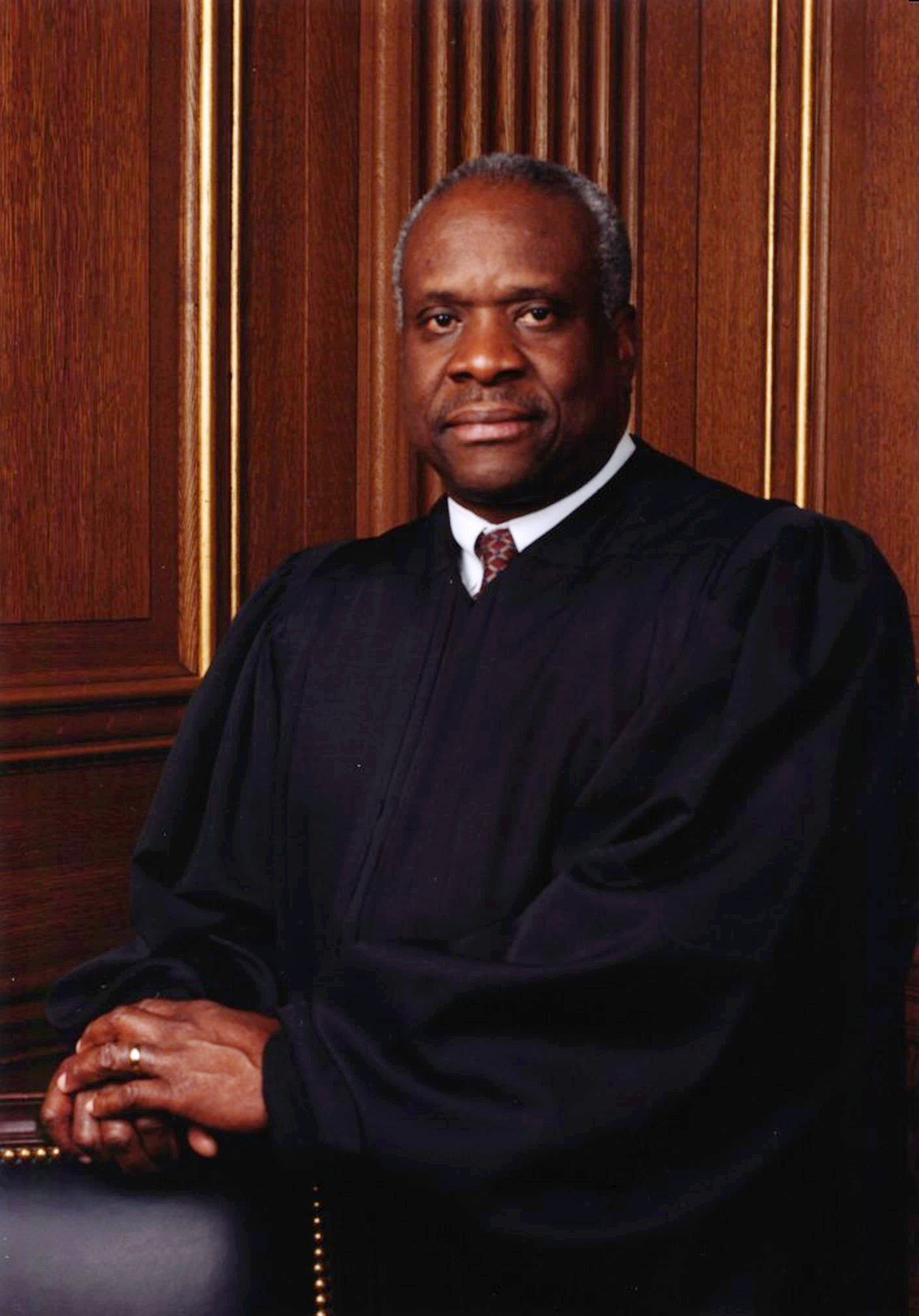
Bush appointed Clarence Thomas to the United States Court of Appeals for the District of Columbia Circuit, and then elevated him to the Supreme Court.

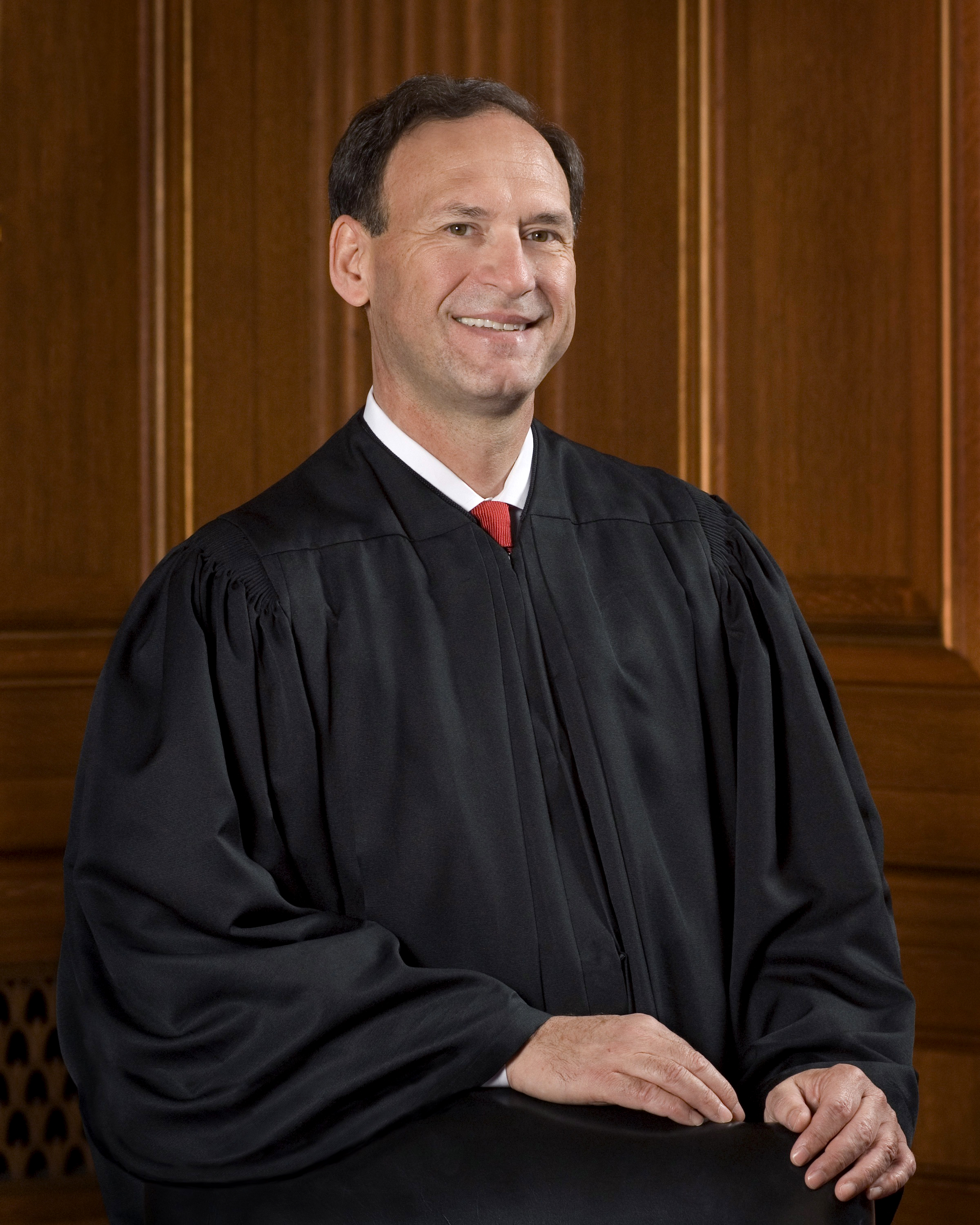
Samuel Alito, appointed by Bush to the United States Court of Appeals for the Third Circuit, was later elevated to the Supreme Court.
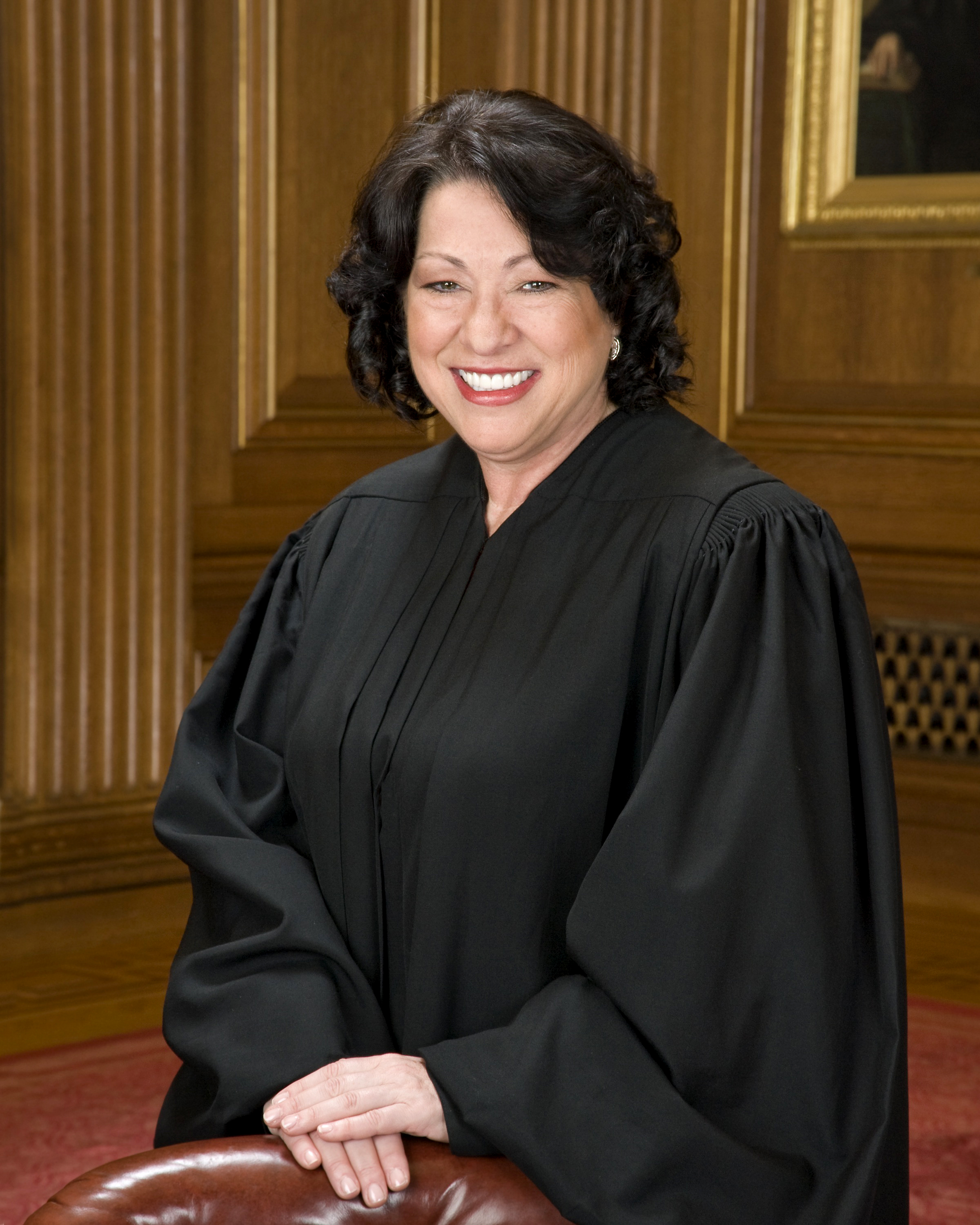
Bush appointed Sonia Sotomayor to the United States District Court for the Southern District of New York; Sotomayor was later elevated to the Second Circuit, and then to the Supreme Court.

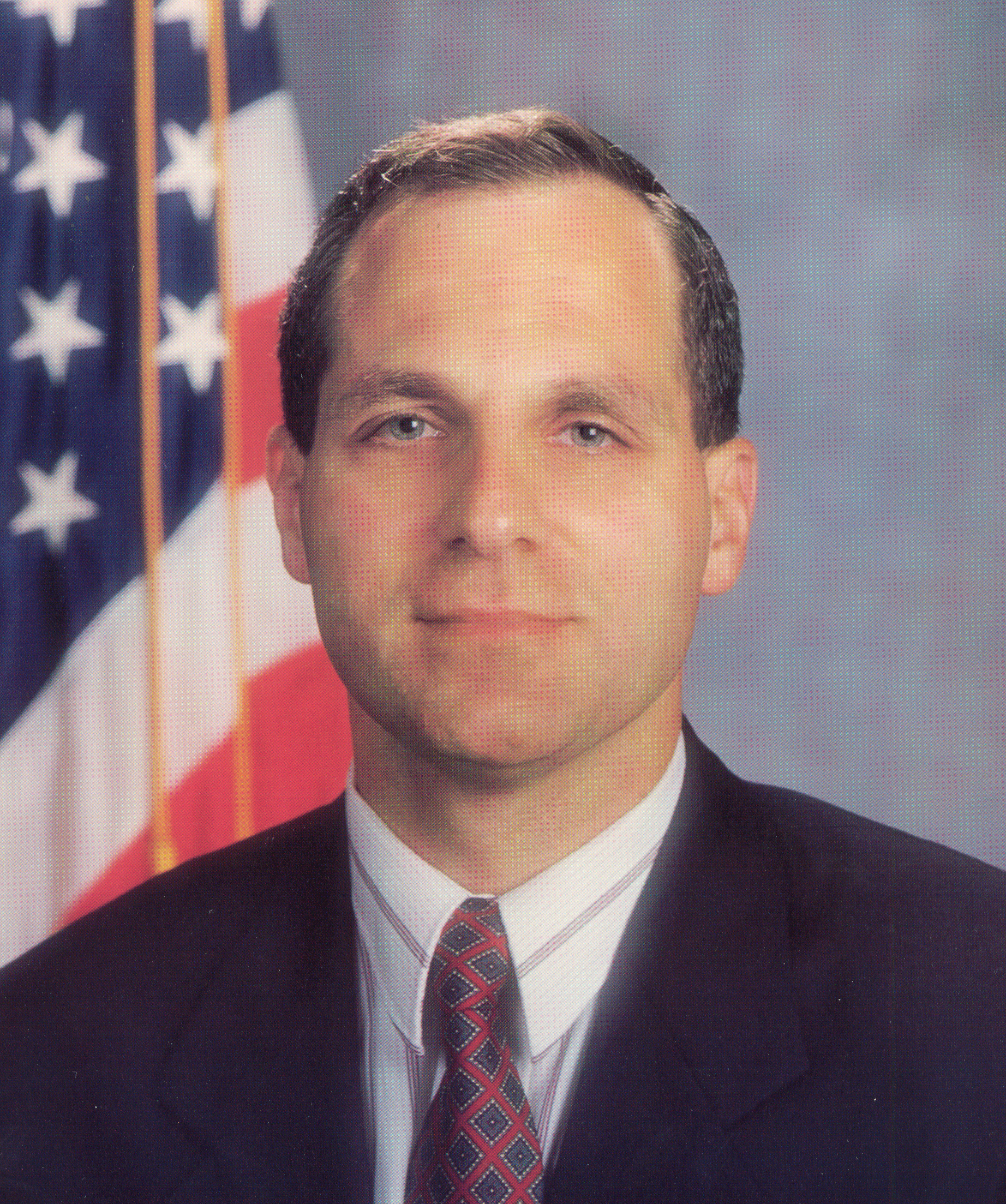
Bush named Louis Freeh to the United States District Court for the Southern District of New York, where Freeh sat for two years before becoming Director of the FBI.

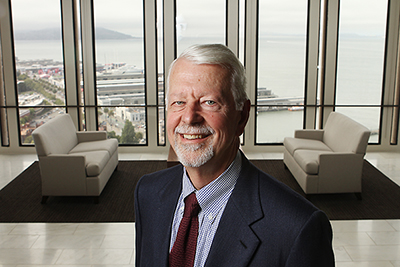
Vaughn Walker, appointed by Bush to the United States District Court for the Northern District of California, and would later be revealed to be the earliest known gay federal judge.

== United States Supreme Court justices ==
#	Justice	Seat	State	Former justice	Nomination date	Confirmation date	Confirmation vote	Began active service	Ended active service	Ended retired service
1	David Souter	3	New Hampshire	William J. Brennan Jr.	July 25, 1990	October 2, 1990	90–9	October 3, 1990	June 29, 2009	May 8, 2025
2	Clarence Thomas	10	Georgia	Thurgood Marshall	July 8, 1991	October 15, 1991	52–48	October 18, 1991	Incumbent	–

== Courts of appeals ==
#	Judge	Circuit	Nomination date	Confirmation date	Confirmation vote	Began active service	Ended active service	Ended senior status
1	Ferdinand Fernandez	Ninth	February 28, 1989 (Note: Originally nominated by President Reagan on September 16, 1988. That nomination expired at the end of the term. Renominated on February 28, 1989 by President Bush.)	May 18, 1989	unanimous consent	May 22, 1989	June 1, 2002	Incumbent
2	Pamela Ann Rymer	Ninth	February 28, 1989 (Note: Originally nominated by President Reagan on April 26, 1988. That nomination expired at the end of the term. Renominated on February 28, 1989 by President Bush.)	May 18, 1989	unanimous consent	May 22, 1989	September 21, 2011	–
3	Conrad K. Cyr	First	August 4, 1989	October 24, 1989	unanimous consent	November 20, 1989	January 31, 1997	July 28, 2016
4	S. Jay Plager	Fed. Cir.	September 12, 1989	November 8, 1989	unanimous consent	November 11, 1989	November 30, 2000	Incumbent
5	John M. Walker Jr.	Second	September 21, 1989	November 22, 1989	unanimous consent	November 27, 1989	September 30, 2006	Incumbent
6	Clarence Thomas	D.C. Cir.	October 30, 1989	March 6, 1990	voice vote	March 6, 1990	October 17, 1991	Elevated
7	Rhesa Barksdale	Fifth	November 17, 1989	March 9, 1990	unanimous consent	March 12, 1990	August 8, 2009	Incumbent
8	Jacques L. Wiener Jr.	Fifth	November 17, 1989 (Note: Originally nominated by President Reagan on June 27, 1988. That nomination expired at the end of the term. Renominated on November 17, 1989 by President Bush.)	March 9, 1990	unanimous consent	March 12, 1990	September 30, 2010	Incumbent
9	Alan David Lourie	Fed. Cir.	January 24, 1990	April 5, 1990	unanimous consent	April 6, 1990	Incumbent	–
10	Raymond C. Clevenger	Fed. Cir.	January 24, 1990	April 27, 1990	unanimous consent	April 30, 1990	February 1, 2006	October 2, 2026
11	David Souter	First	January 24, 1990	April 27, 1990	unanimous consent	April 30, 1990	October 8, 1990	Elevated
12	Samuel Alito	Third	February 20, 1990	April 27, 1990	unanimous consent	April 30, 1990	January 31, 2006	Elevated
13	Stanley F. Birch Jr.	Eleventh	March 22, 1990	May 11, 1990	unanimous consent	May 14, 1990	August 29, 2010	–
14	Richard Fred Suhrheinrich	Sixth	April 18, 1990	June 29, 1990	unanimous consent	July 10, 1990	August 15, 2001	Incumbent
15	Karen L. Henderson	D.C. Cir.	May 8, 1990	June 29, 1990	unanimous consent	July 5, 1990	Incumbent	–
16	A. Raymond Randolph	D.C. Cir.	May 8, 1990	July 13, 1990	unanimous consent	July 16, 1990	November 1, 2008	Incumbent
17	Paul V. Niemeyer	Fourth	May 11, 1990	August 4, 1990	unanimous consent	August 7, 1990	Incumbent	–
18	Randall Ray Rader	Fed. Cir.	June 12, 1990	August 4, 1990	unanimous consent	August 9, 1990	June 30, 2014	–
19	Joel Fredrick Dubina	Eleventh	June 7, 1990	September 28, 1990	unanimous consent	October 1, 1990	October 26, 2013	Incumbent
20	Joseph M. McLaughlin	Second	July 10, 1990	October 12, 1990	unanimous consent	October 17, 1990	March 20, 1998	August 8, 2013
21	Thomas G. Nelson	Ninth	July 18, 1990	October 12, 1990	unanimous consent	October 17, 1990	November 14, 2003	May 4, 2011
22	James B. Loken	Eighth	September 10, 1990	October 12, 1990	unanimous consent	October 17, 1990	Incumbent	–
23	Emilio M. Garza	Fifth	April 11, 1991	May 24, 1991	unanimous consent	May 30, 1991	August 1, 2012	January 5, 2015
24	Jane Richards Roth	Third	May 16, 1991	June 28, 1991	unanimous consent	July 2, 1991	May 31, 2006	Incumbent
25	Clyde H. Hamilton	Fourth	June 12, 1991	July 18, 1991	unanimous consent	July 22, 1991	November 30, 1999	September 2, 2020
26	J. Michael Luttig	Fourth	April 23, 1991	July 29, 1991	unanimous consent	August 2, 1991	May 10, 2006	–
27	Andrew Kleinfeld	Ninth	May 23, 1991	September 12, 1991	unanimous consent	September 16, 1991	June 12, 2010	November 7, 2025
28	Eugene E. Siler Jr.	Sixth	June 16, 1991	September 12, 1991	unanimous consent	September 16, 1991	December 31, 2001	Incumbent
29	David R. Hansen	Eighth	July 30, 1991	November 15, 1991	unanimous consent	November 18, 1991	April 1, 2003	Incumbent
30	Alice M. Batchelder	Sixth	June 12, 1991	November 27, 1991	unanimous consent	December 2, 1991	March 7, 2019	Incumbent
31	Harold R. DeMoss Jr.	Fifth	June 27, 1991	November 27, 1991	unanimous consent	December 2, 1991	July 1, 2007	April 16, 2015
32	Karen J. Williams	Fourth	January 27, 1992	February 27, 1992	unanimous consent	March 2, 1992	July 8, 2009	November 2, 2013
33	Paul Joseph Kelly Jr.	Tenth	November 19, 1991	April 8, 1992	unanimous consent	April 13, 1992	December 31, 2017	Incumbent
34	Morris S. Arnold	Eighth	November 6, 1991	May 21, 1992	unanimous consent	May 26, 1992	October 9, 2006	Incumbent
35	Michael Boudin	First	March 20, 1992	May 21, 1992	unanimous consent	May 26, 1992	June 1, 2013	December 15, 2021
36	Norman H. Stahl	First	April 9, 1992	June 26, 1992	unanimous consent	June 30, 1992	April 16, 2001	April 8, 2023
37	Susan H. Black	Eleventh	March 10, 1992	August 11, 1992	unanimous consent	August 12, 1992	February 25, 2011	Incumbent
38	Alvin Anthony Schall	Fed. Cir.	March 3, 1992	August 12, 1992	unanimous consent	August 17, 1992	October 5, 2009	Incumbent
39	Ilana Rovner	Seventh	July 2, 1992	August 12, 1992	unanimous consent	August 17, 1992	July 10, 2024	Incumbent
40	Edward Earl Carnes	Eleventh	January 27, 1992	September 9, 1992	62–36	September 10, 1992	June 30, 2020	Incumbent
41	Dennis Jacobs	Second	March 20, 1992	September 29, 1992	unanimous consent	October 2, 1992	May 31, 2019	Incumbent
42	Timothy K. Lewis	Third	September 17, 1992	October 8, 1992	unanimous consent	October 9, 1992	June 30, 1999	–

== District courts ==
#	Judge	Court (Note: See List of United States district and territorial courts)	Nomination date	Confirmation date	Confirmation vote	Began active service	Ended active service	Ended senior status
1	Robert C. Bonner	C.D. Cal.	February 28, 1989 (Note: Originally nominated on June 15, 1988 by President Reagan. That nomination expired at the end of the term. Renominated by President Bush on February 28, 1989.)	May 18, 1989	unanimous consent	May 24, 1989	August 12, 1990	–
2	Melinda Harmon	S.D. Tex.	February 28, 1989 (Note: Originally nominated on June 23, 1988 by President Reagan. That nomination expired at the end of the term. Renominated by President Bush on February 28, 1989.)	May 18, 1989	unanimous consent	May 22, 1989	March 31, 2018	Incumbent
3	Marvin J. Garbis	D. Md.	August 4, 1989 (Note: Originally nominated on July 6, 1988 by President Reagan. That nomination expired at the end of the term. Renominated by President Bush on August 4, 1989.)	October 24, 1989	unanimous consent	October 25, 1989	June 14, 2003	June 26, 2018
4	Rebecca Beach Smith	E.D. Va.	August 4, 1989	October 24, 1989	unanimous consent	October 25, 1989	August 1, 2019	Incumbent
5	George W. Lindberg	N.D. Ill.	September 21, 1989	November 3, 1989	unanimous consent	November 6, 1989	June 21, 2001	March 19, 2019
6	Vaughn Walker	N.D. Cal.	February 28, 1989 (Note: Originally nominated on December 18, 1987 by President Reagan. That nomination expired at the end of the term. Renominated by President Bush on February 28, 1989. Renominated on September 7, 1989 by President Bush.)	November 21, 1989	unanimous consent	November 27, 1989	February 28, 2011	–
7	Edward Lodge	D. Idaho	October 30, 1989	November 22, 1989	unanimous consent	November 27, 1989	July 4, 2015	Incumbent
8	Edward Nottingham	D. Colo.	October 20, 1989	November 22, 1989	unanimous consent	November 27, 1989	October 29, 2008	–
9	Arthur Spatt	E.D.N.Y.	October 25, 1989	November 22, 1989	unanimous consent	November 27, 1989	December 1, 2004	June 12, 2020
10	George Thomas Van Bebber	D. Kan.	September 13, 1989	November 22, 1989	unanimous consent	December 8, 1989	December 31, 2000	May 26, 2005
11	Edwin L. Nelson	N.D. Ala.	September 13, 1989	January 23, 1990	unanimous consent	January 24, 1990	May 17, 2003	–
12	Susan Webber Wright	E.D. Ark. W.D. Ark.	September 21, 1989	January 23, 1990	unanimous consent	January 24, 1990	August 22, 2013; December 1, 1990	Incumbent –
13	Ronald L. Buckwalter	E.D. Pa.	November 17, 1989	March 9, 1990	unanimous consent	March 12, 1990	December 11, 2003	Incumbent
14	Donald J. Lee	W.D. Pa.	November 9, 1989	March 9, 1990	unanimous consent	March 12, 1990	April 6, 2000	March 17, 2011
15	Gerald Ellis Rosen	E.D. Mich.	November 9, 1989	March 9, 1990	unanimous consent	March 12, 1990	October 26, 2016	January 31, 2017
16	John S. Martin Jr.	S.D.N.Y.	January 24, 1990	April 5, 1990	unanimous consent	April 6, 1990	May 31, 2003	September 30, 2003
17	Daniel B. Sparr	D. Colo.	January 24, 1990	April 5, 1990	unanimous consent	April 6, 1990	May 1, 2001	November 9, 2006
18	Norman H. Stahl	D.N.H.	January 24, 1990	April 5, 1990	unanimous consent	April 6, 1990	June 30, 1992	Elevated
19	Joseph Martin Hood	E.D. Ky.	January 24, 1990	April 27, 1990	unanimous consent	April 30, 1990	October 14, 2007	Incumbent
20	D. Brock Hornby	D. Me.	March 6, 1990	April 27, 1990	unanimous consent	April 30, 1990	April 30, 2010	Incumbent
21	Robert E. Jones	D. Or.	February 20, 1990	April 27, 1990	unanimous consent	April 30, 1990	May 1, 2000	March 29, 2025
22	James Focht McClure Jr.	M.D. Pa.	January 24, 1990	April 27, 1990	unanimous consent	April 30, 1990	April 7, 2001	December 17, 2010
23	Lawrence M. McKenna	S.D.N.Y.	January 24, 1990	April 27, 1990	unanimous consent	April 30, 1990	May 24, 2002	February 3, 2023
24	Stephen M. McNamee	D. Ariz.	February 20, 1990	May 11, 1990	unanimous consent	June 4, 1990	October 1, 2007	Incumbent
25	William M. Nickerson	D. Md.	January 24, 1990	May 11, 1990	unanimous consent	May 14, 1990	June 11, 2002	Incumbent
26	John David Rainey	S.D. Tex.	January 24, 1990	May 11, 1990	unanimous consent	May 14, 1990	June 11, 2010	Incumbent
27	Jack D. Shanstrom	D. Mont.	February 23, 1990	May 11, 1990	unanimous consent	May 14, 1990	January 30, 2001	January 13, 2020
28	James K. Singleton	D. Alaska	January 24, 1990	May 11, 1990	unanimous consent	May 14, 1990	January 27, 2005	Incumbent
29	Richard W. Vollmer Jr.	S.D. Ala.	March 30, 1990	May 11, 1990	unanimous consent	May 14, 1990	December 31, 2000	March 20, 2003
30	Samuel Grayson Wilson	W.D. Va.	March 6, 1990	May 11, 1990	unanimous consent	May 14, 1990	July 31, 2014	–
31	Robert Hardy Cleland	E.D. Mich.	February 20, 1990	June 18, 1990	unanimous consent	June 19, 1990	February 28, 2013	Incumbent
32	David C. Norton	D.S.C.	April 18, 1990	June 29, 1990	unanimous consent	July 12, 1990	Incumbent	–
33	Frederick Pfarr Stamp Jr.	N.D.W.Va.	May 11, 1990	June 29, 1990	unanimous consent	July 12, 1990	November 1, 2006	Incumbent
34	Federico A. Moreno	S.D. Fla.	June 5, 1990	July 13, 1990	unanimous consent	July 16, 1990	July 17, 2020	Incumbent
35	Carol Amon	E.D.N.Y.	May 18, 1990	August 4, 1990	unanimous consent	August 7, 1990	November 30, 2016	Incumbent
36	Michael Boudin	D.D.C.	May 18, 1990	August 4, 1990	unanimous consent	August 7, 1990	January 31, 1992	–
37	John H. McBryde	N.D. Tex.	May 11, 1990	August 4, 1990	unanimous consent	August 7, 1990	October 9, 2018	December 25, 2022
38	Fred I. Parker	D. Vt.	June 21, 1990	August 4, 1990	unanimous consent	August 7, 1990	October 11, 1994	Elevated
39	William M. Skretny	W.D.N.Y.	June 12, 1990	August 4, 1990	unanimous consent	August 7, 1990	March 8, 2015	Incumbent
40	Graham Calder Mullen	W.D.N.C.	February 20, 1990	September 10, 1990	unanimous consent	September 11, 1990	December 1, 2005	Incumbent
41	Jean Constance Hamilton	E.D. Mo.	August 3, 1990	September 28, 1990	unanimous consent	October 1, 1990	July 1, 2013	Incumbent
42	Samuel B. Kent	S.D. Tex.	August 3, 1990	September 28, 1990	unanimous consent	October 1, 1990	June 30, 2009	–
43	David F. Levi	E.D. Cal.	August 3, 1990	September 28, 1990	unanimous consent	October 1, 1990	June 30, 2007	–
44	Charles W. Pickering	S.D. Miss.	May 11, 1990	September 28, 1990	unanimous consent	October 1, 1990	January 16, 2004	Elevated
45	William B. Shubb	E.D. Cal.	August 3, 1990	September 28, 1990	unanimous consent	October 1, 1990	November 1, 2004	Incumbent
46	Gary L. Taylor	C.D. Cal.	August 3, 1990	September 28, 1990	unanimous consent	October 1, 1990	December 8, 2004	July 1, 2005
47	James Ware	N.D. Cal.	August 3, 1990	September 28, 1990	unanimous consent	October 1, 1990	August 31, 2012	–
48	Dennis Shedd	D.S.C.	October 17, 1990	October 27, 1990	unanimous consent	October 30, 1990	December 10, 2002	Elevated
49	Robin J. Cauthron	W.D. Okla.	February 7, 1991	March 21, 1991	unanimous consent	March 25, 1991	July 14, 2015	Incumbent
50	Oliver Winston Wanger	E.D. Cal.	September 21, 1990 (Note: Renominated on January 8, 1991.)	March 21, 1991	unanimous consent	March 25, 1991	May 31, 2006	October 1, 2011
51	Harold Albritton	M.D. Ala.	March 11, 1991	May 9, 1991	unanimous consent	May 14, 1991	May 17, 2004	Incumbent
52	Henry Michael Herlong Jr.	D.S.C.	April 9, 1991	May 9, 1991	unanimous consent	May 14, 1991	June 1, 2009	Incumbent
53	Marilyn L. Huff	S.D. Cal.	March 12, 1991	May 9, 1991	unanimous consent	May 14, 1991	September 30, 2016	Incumbent
54	William Fremming Nielsen	E.D. Wash.	March 21, 1991	May 9, 1991	unanimous consent	May 14, 1991	May 30, 2003	Incumbent
55	Frederick L. Van Sickle	E.D. Wash.	March 21, 1991	May 9, 1991	unanimous consent	May 14, 1991	May 1, 2008	September 2, 2021
56	Sharon Lovelace Blackburn	N.D. Ala.	April 11, 1991	May 24, 1991	unanimous consent	May 30, 1991	May 8, 2015	Incumbent
57	Louis Freeh	S.D.N.Y.	April 9, 1991	May 24, 1991	unanimous consent	May 30, 1991	August 31, 1993	–
58	Richard T. Haik	W.D. La.	April 11, 1991	May 24, 1991	unanimous consent	May 30, 1991	March 6, 2015	January 15, 2016
59	Saundra Brown Armstrong	N.D. Cal.	April 25, 1991	June 14, 1991	unanimous consent	June 18, 1991	March 23, 2012	Incumbent
60	Timothy K. Lewis	W.D. Pa.	April 25, 1991	June 14, 1991	unanimous consent	June 18, 1991	October 23, 1992	Elevated
61	William Lindsay Osteen Sr.	M.D.N.C.	April 25, 1991	June 14, 1991	unanimous consent	June 18, 1991	April 3, 2006	September 14, 2007
62	Sterling Johnson Jr.	E.D.N.Y.	May 17, 1991	June 28, 1991	unanimous consent	July 2, 1991	June 1, 2003	October 10, 2022
63	Ralph Wilson Nimmons Jr.	M.D. Fla.	May 23, 1991 (Note: Previously nominated by President Carter on September 17, 1980 to a different seat on the same court. That nomination expired at the end of the term. Renominated on May 23, 1991 to a different seat on the same court by President Bush.)	June 28, 1991	unanimous consent	July 2, 1991	November 24, 2003	–
64	Harvey E. Schlesinger	M.D. Fla.	May 23, 1991	June 28, 1991	unanimous consent	July 2, 1991	June 5, 2006	Incumbent
65	Morton A. Brody	D. Me.	June 14, 1991	July 18, 1991	unanimous consent	July 25, 1991	March 25, 2000	–
66	Fernando J. Gaitan Jr.	W.D. Mo.	May 16, 1991	July 18, 1991	unanimous consent	August 2, 1991	January 3, 2014	Incumbent
67	Harvey Bartle III	E.D. Pa.	May 15, 1991	September 12, 1991	unanimous consent	September 16, 1991	October 1, 2011	Incumbent
68	William G. Bassler	D.N.J.	June 14, 1991	September 12, 1991	unanimous consent	September 16, 1991	March 6, 2005	August 31, 2006
69	Dee Benson	D. Utah	May 16, 1991	September 12, 1991	unanimous consent	September 16, 1991	January 1, 2014	November 30, 2020
70	Stewart Dalzell	E.D. Pa.	July 24, 1991	September 12, 1991	unanimous consent	September 16, 1991	October 31, 2013	December 31, 2016
71	Donald L. Graham	S.D. Fla.	June 17, 1991	September 12, 1991	unanimous consent	September 16, 1991	December 15, 2013	Incumbent
72	Shelby Highsmith	S.D. Fla.	June 27, 1991	September 12, 1991	unanimous consent	September 16, 1991	March 15, 2002	December 2, 2015
73	Michael Robert Hogan	D. Or.	June 27, 1991	September 12, 1991	unanimous consent	September 16, 1991	September 24, 2011	November 1, 2012
74	Benson Everett Legg	D. Md.	May 15, 1991	September 12, 1991	unanimous consent	September 16, 1991	June 8, 2012	February 6, 2013
75	Jorge Antonio Solis	N.D. Tex.	June 19, 1991	September 12, 1991	unanimous consent	September 16, 1991	May 1, 2016	–
76	James Travis Trimble Jr.	W.D. La.	June 27, 1991	September 12, 1991	unanimous consent	September 16, 1991	September 13, 2002	Incumbent
77	William H. Yohn Jr.	E.D. Pa.	June 14, 1991	September 12, 1991	unanimous consent	September 16, 1991	November 20, 2003	January 3, 2026
78	Barbara A. Caulfield	N.D. Cal.	June 27, 1991	October 31, 1991	voice vote	November 5, 1991	September 16, 1994	–
79	Rebecca F. Doherty	W.D. La.	June 27, 1991	October 31, 1991	voice vote	November 5, 1991	June 5, 2017	May 1, 2020
80	Denis Reagan Hurley	E.D.N.Y.	June 27, 1991	October 31, 1991	voice vote	November 5, 1991	December 18, 2004	Incumbent
81	Ronald Earl Longstaff	S.D. Iowa	July 24, 1991	October 31, 1991	voice vote	November 5, 1991	November 5, 2006	Incumbent
82	John Watson Lungstrum	D. Kan.	July 24, 1991	October 31, 1991	voice vote	November 5, 1991	November 2, 2010	Incumbent
83	Terry R. Means	N.D. Tex.	July 24, 1991	October 31, 1991	voice vote	November 5, 1991	July 3, 2013	Incumbent
84	Wayne Andersen	N.D. Ill.	July 24, 1991	November 15, 1991	unanimous consent	November 18, 1991	July 31, 2010	–
85	Lacey A. Collier	N.D. Fla.	July 24, 1991	November 15, 1991	unanimous consent	November 18, 1991	November 20, 2003	Incumbent
86	Paul Ramon Matia	N.D. Ohio	June 27, 1991	November 15, 1991	unanimous consent	November 18, 1991	December 31, 2004	May 31, 2005
87	Sue Lewis Robinson	D. Del.	October 1, 1991	November 15, 1991	unanimous consent	November 18, 1991	February 3, 2017	July 14, 2017
88	Monti Belot	D. Kan.	July 26, 1991	November 21, 1991	unanimous consent	November 25, 1991	March 4, 2008	Incumbent
89	David C. Bramlette	S.D. Miss.	July 26, 1991	November 21, 1991	unanimous consent	November 25, 1991	March 20, 2006	Incumbent
90	Edith Brown Clement	E.D. La.	October 1, 1991	November 21, 1991	unanimous consent	November 25, 1991	November 27, 2001	Elevated
91	Anne C. Conway	M.D. Fla.	July 24, 1991	November 21, 1991	unanimous consent	November 25, 1991	August 1, 2015	Incumbent
92	David A. Faber	S.D.W.Va.	August 1, 1991	November 21, 1991	unanimous consent	November 25, 1991	December 31, 2008	Incumbent
93	Joe Billy McDade	C.D. Ill.	September 11, 1991	November 21, 1991	unanimous consent	November 25, 1991	February 28, 2010	Incumbent
94	Sam Sparks	W.D. Tex.	October 1, 1991	November 21, 1991	unanimous consent	November 25, 1991	December 31, 2017	September 17, 2025
95	John Roll	D. Ariz.	September 23, 1991	November 22, 1991	unanimous consent	November 25, 1991	January 8, 2011	–
96	Sandra Beckwith	S.D. Ohio	July 26, 1991	February 6, 1992	unanimous consent	February 10, 1992	January 1, 2009	Incumbent
97	Julie E. Carnes	N.D. Ga.	August 1, 1991	February 6, 1992	unanimous consent	February 10, 1992	July 31, 2014	Elevated
98	Nancy Garlock Edmunds	E.D. Mich.	September 11, 1991	February 6, 1992	unanimous consent	February 10, 1992	August 1, 2012	Incumbent
99	Jon Phipps McCalla	W.D. Tenn.	August 1, 1991	February 6, 1992	unanimous consent	February 10, 1992	August 23, 2013	May 15, 2026
100	David McKeague	W.D. Mich.	September 11, 1991	February 6, 1992	unanimous consent	February 10, 1992	June 13, 2005	Elevated
101	Steven Douglas Merryday	M.D. Fla.	September 23, 1991	February 6, 1992	unanimous consent	February 10, 1992	August 31, 2025	Incumbent
102	K. Michael Moore	S.D. Fla.	October 4, 1991	February 6, 1992	unanimous consent	February 10, 1992	Incumbent	–
103	Philip Godfrey Reinhard	N.D. Ill.	August 1, 1991	February 6, 1992	unanimous consent	February 10, 1992	January 12, 2007	Incumbent
104	Frederick Scullin	N.D.N.Y.	September 12, 1991	February 6, 1992	unanimous consent	February 10, 1992	March 13, 2006	Incumbent
105	Ronald Whyte	N.D. Cal.	July 26, 1991	February 6, 1992	unanimous consent	February 10, 1992	March 2, 2009	April 10, 2023
106	Garland E. Burrell Jr.	E.D. Cal.	August 1, 1991	February 27, 1992	unanimous consent	March 2, 1992	July 4, 2012	Incumbent
107	Mary Little Cooper	D.N.J.	July 26, 1991	February 27, 1992	unanimous consent	March 2, 1992	August 31, 2011	Incumbent
108	Roderick R. McKelvie	D. Del.	November 5, 1991	February 27, 1992	unanimous consent	March 2, 1992	June 28, 2002	–
109	William Byrd Traxler Jr.	D.S.C.	November 14, 1991	February 27, 1992	unanimous consent	March 2, 1992	October 21, 1998	Elevated
110	Ira De Ment	M.D. Ala.	November 14, 1991	March 13, 1992	unanimous consent	March 18, 1992	April 15, 2002	July 16, 2011
111	Robert L. Echols	M.D. Tenn.	October 22, 1991	March 13, 1992	unanimous consent	March 18, 1992	March 1, 2007	July 31, 2010
112	Jimm Larry Hendren	W.D. Ark.	November 5, 1991 (Note: Previously nominated on October 24, 1991 to the Eastern District of Arkansas. That nomination was withdrawn on November 5, 1991 and he was nominated to the Western District of Arkansas on the same day.)	March 13, 1992	unanimous consent	March 18, 1992	December 31, 2012	Incumbent
113	John R. Padova	E.D. Pa.	November 5, 1991	March 13, 1992	unanimous consent	March 18, 1992	February 11, 2008	Incumbent
114	Joseph E. Irenas	D.N.J.	November 14, 1991	April 8, 1992	unanimous consent	April 13, 1992	July 1, 2002	October 16, 2015
115	J. Curtis Joyner	E.D. Pa.	November 5, 1991	April 8, 1992	unanimous consent	April 13, 1992	May 1, 2013	September 15, 2021
116	Henry Coke Morgan Jr.	E.D. Va.	October 22, 1991	April 8, 1992	unanimous consent	April 13, 1992	February 8, 2004	May 1, 2022
117	Donald J. Stohr	E.D. Mo.	November 14, 1991	April 8, 1992	unanimous consent	April 13, 1992	December 31, 2006	December 10, 2015
118	Ewing Werlein Jr.	S.D. Tex.	November 20, 1991	April 8, 1992	unanimous consent	April 13, 1992	January 1, 2006	Incumbent
119	Elton Joe Kendall	N.D. Tex.	March 20, 1992	May 12, 1992	unanimous consent	May 15, 1992	January 22, 2002	–
120	Richard H. Kyle	D. Minn.	March 20, 1992	May 12, 1992	unanimous consent	May 13, 1992	May 31, 2005	June 22, 2021
121	Robert E. Payne	E.D. Va.	November 20, 1991	May 12, 1992	unanimous consent	May 13, 1992	May 7, 2007	Incumbent
122	Lee H. Rosenthal	S.D. Tex.	March 20, 1992	May 12, 1992	unanimous consent	May 13, 1992	December 1, 2024	Incumbent
123	Richard G. Kopf	D. Neb.	April 7, 1992	May 21, 1992	unanimous consent	May 26, 1992	December 1, 2011	January 17, 2025
124	Jerome B. Simandle	D.N.J.	April 1, 1992	May 21, 1992	unanimous consent	May 26, 1992	May 31, 2017	July 19, 2019
125	Gordon Jay Quist	W.D. Mich.	March 20, 1992	June 26, 1992	unanimous consent	June 30, 1992	January 1, 2006	Incumbent
126	Eduardo C. Robreno	E.D. Pa.	November 26, 1991	June 26, 1992	unanimous consent	June 30, 1992	August 31, 2013	August 31, 2023
127	Lourdes Baird	C.D. Cal.	April 2, 1992	August 11, 1992	unanimous consent	August 12, 1992	May 12, 2004	April 15, 2005
128	Irma Elsa Gonzalez	S.D. Cal.	April 9, 1992	August 11, 1992	unanimous consent	August 12, 1992	March 29, 2013	October 25, 2013
129	Irene Patricia Murphy Keeley	N.D.W.Va.	April 1, 1992	August 11, 1992	unanimous consent	August 12, 1992	August 12, 2017	Incumbent
130	Timothy D. Leonard	W.D. Okla.	November 20, 1991	August 11, 1992	unanimous consent	August 12, 1992	August 21, 2006	March 2, 2026
131	Loretta Preska	S.D.N.Y.	March 31, 1992	August 11, 1992	unanimous consent	August 12, 1992	March 1, 2017	Incumbent
132	Rudolph T. Randa	E.D. Wis.	April 9, 1992	August 11, 1992	unanimous consent	August 12, 1992	February 5, 2016	September 5, 2016
133	Sonia Sotomayor	S.D.N.Y.	November 27, 1991	August 11, 1992	unanimous consent	August 12, 1992	October 13, 1998	Elevated
134	Alfred V. Covello	D. Conn.	April 1, 1992	August 12, 1992	unanimous consent	August 17, 1992	February 4, 2003	February 18, 2025
135	Joseph A. Diclerico Jr.	D.N.H.	April 9, 1992	August 12, 1992	unanimous consent	August 17, 1992	March 15, 2007	April 2, 2022
136	John G. Heyburn II	W.D. Ky.	March 20, 1992	August 12, 1992	unanimous consent	August 17, 1992	April 1, 2014	April 29, 2015
137	Carol E. Jackson	E.D. Mo.	April 1, 1992	August 12, 1992	unanimous consent	August 17, 1992	August 31, 2017	–
138	Linda Hodge McLaughlin	C.D. Cal.	March 20, 1992	August 12, 1992	unanimous consent	August 17, 1992	March 7, 1999	–
139	Michael Joseph Melloy	N.D. Iowa	April 9, 1992	August 12, 1992	unanimous consent	August 17, 1992	February 26, 2002	Elevated
140	John Phil Gilbert	S.D. Ill.	July 2, 1992	September 23, 1992	unanimous consent	September 24, 1992	March 15, 2014	Incumbent
141	Nathaniel M. Gorton	D. Mass.	April 28, 1992	September 23, 1992	unanimous consent	September 24, 1992	May 31, 2025	Incumbent
142	Curtis LeRoy Hansen	D.N.M.	March 20, 1992	September 25, 1992	unanimous consent	October 2, 1992	April 18, 2003	October 27, 2023
143	Anita B. Brody	E.D. Pa.	November 22, 1991	September 29, 1992	unanimous consent	October 2, 1992	June 8, 2009	Incumbent
144	Paul Barbadoro	D.N.H.	September 9, 1992	October 8, 1992	unanimous consent	October 9, 1992	March 1, 2021	Incumbent
145	Steven J. McAuliffe	D.N.H.	September 9, 1992	October 8, 1992	unanimous consent	October 10, 1992	April 1, 2013	Incumbent
146	John W. Sedwick	D. Alaska	July 2, 1992	October 8, 1992	unanimous consent	October 9, 1992	March 13, 2011	Incumbent
147	Ursula Mancusi Ungaro	S.D. Fla.	November 26, 1991	October 8, 1992	unanimous consent	October 9, 1992	May 2, 2021	May 31, 2021
148	Kathryn H. Vratil	D. Kan.	July 28, 1992	October 8, 1992	unanimous consent	October 9, 1992	April 22, 2014	Incumbent

== United States Court of International Trade ==
#	Judge	Nomination date	Confirmation date	Confirmation vote	Began active service	Ended active service	Ended senior status
1	Richard W. Goldberg	January 8, 1991	March 21, 1991	unanimous consent	March 25, 1991	April 2, 2001	July 18, 2023

== Specialty courts (Article I) ==
=== United States Court of Federal Claims ===
#	Judge	Nomination date	Confirmation date	Confirmation vote	Began active service	Ended active service	Ended senior status
1	Robert H. Hodges Jr.	January 25, 1990	March 9, 1990	unanimous consent	March 12, 1990	March 11, 2005	Incumbent
2	Diane Gilbert Sypolt	July 31, 1990	October 12, 1990	unanimous consent	October 17, 1990	January 31, 2005	September 1, 2005

=== United States Court of Military Appeals ===
#	Judge	Nomination date	Confirmation date	Confirmation vote	Began active service	Ended active service	Ended senior status
1	Susan J. Crawford	February 19, 1991	November 14, 1991	unanimous consent	November 19, 1991	September 30, 2006	Incumbent
2	H. F. Gierke III	October 2, 1991	November 14, 1991	unanimous consent	November 20, 1991	September 30, 2006	August 7, 2016
3	Robert E. Wiss	October 2, 1991	November 14, 1991	unanimous consent	January 2, 1992	October 23, 1995	—

=== United States Court of Veterans Appeals ===
#	Judge	Nomination date	Confirmation date	Confirmation vote	Began active service	Ended active service	Ended senior status
1	Frank Q. Nebeker	April 4, 1989	May 17, 1989	unanimous consent	October 16, 1989	December 16, 2004	December 20, 2021
2	Ken Kramer	May 9, 1989	September 14, 1989	unanimous consent	October 16, 1989	September 14, 2004	Incumbent
3	John J. Farley III	September 6, 1989	September 14, 1989	unanimous consent	October 16, 1989	2004	2012
4	Hart T. Mankin	September 29, 1989	August 4, 1990	unanimous consent	1989	1995	May 28, 1996
5	Ronald M. Holdaway	January 23, 1990	August 4, 1990	unanimous consent	1990	November 2002	Incumbent
6	Donald L. Ivers	January 31, 1990	August 4, 1990	unanimous consent	August 6, 1990	August 6, 2005	2017
7	Jonathan R. Steinberg	May 15, 1990	August 4, 1990	unanimous consent	1990	August 2005	—

=== United States Tax Court ===
#	Judge	Nomination date	Confirmation date	Confirmation vote	Began active service	Ended active service	Ended senior status
1	James Halpern	April 24, 1990	June 6, 1990	unanimous consent	July 3, 1990	October 16, 2015	Incumbent
2	Renato Beghe	January 25, 1991	March 21, 1991	unanimous consent	March 26, 1991	February 28, 2003	July 7, 2012
3	Carolyn Chiechi	July 28, 1992	August 12, 1992	unanimous consent	October 1, 1992	September 3, 2007	October 19, 2018
4	David Laro	July 28, 1992	August 12, 1992	unanimous consent	November 2, 1992	November 1, 2007	September 21, 2018

== Territorial courts (Article IV) ==
#	Judge	Court	Nomination date	Confirmation date	Confirmation vote	Began active service	Ended active service	Ended senior status
1	Thomas K. Moore	D.V.I.	October 22, 1991	June 26, 1992	unanimous consent	August 14, 1992	January 3, 2005	—
2	John S. Unpingco	D. Guam	July 22, 1992	October 8, 1992	unanimous consent	October 9, 1992	April 30, 2004	—

== Notes ==
Renominations

== Sources ==
- Federal Judicial Center
