= Drake Edens =

American politician (1925–1982)

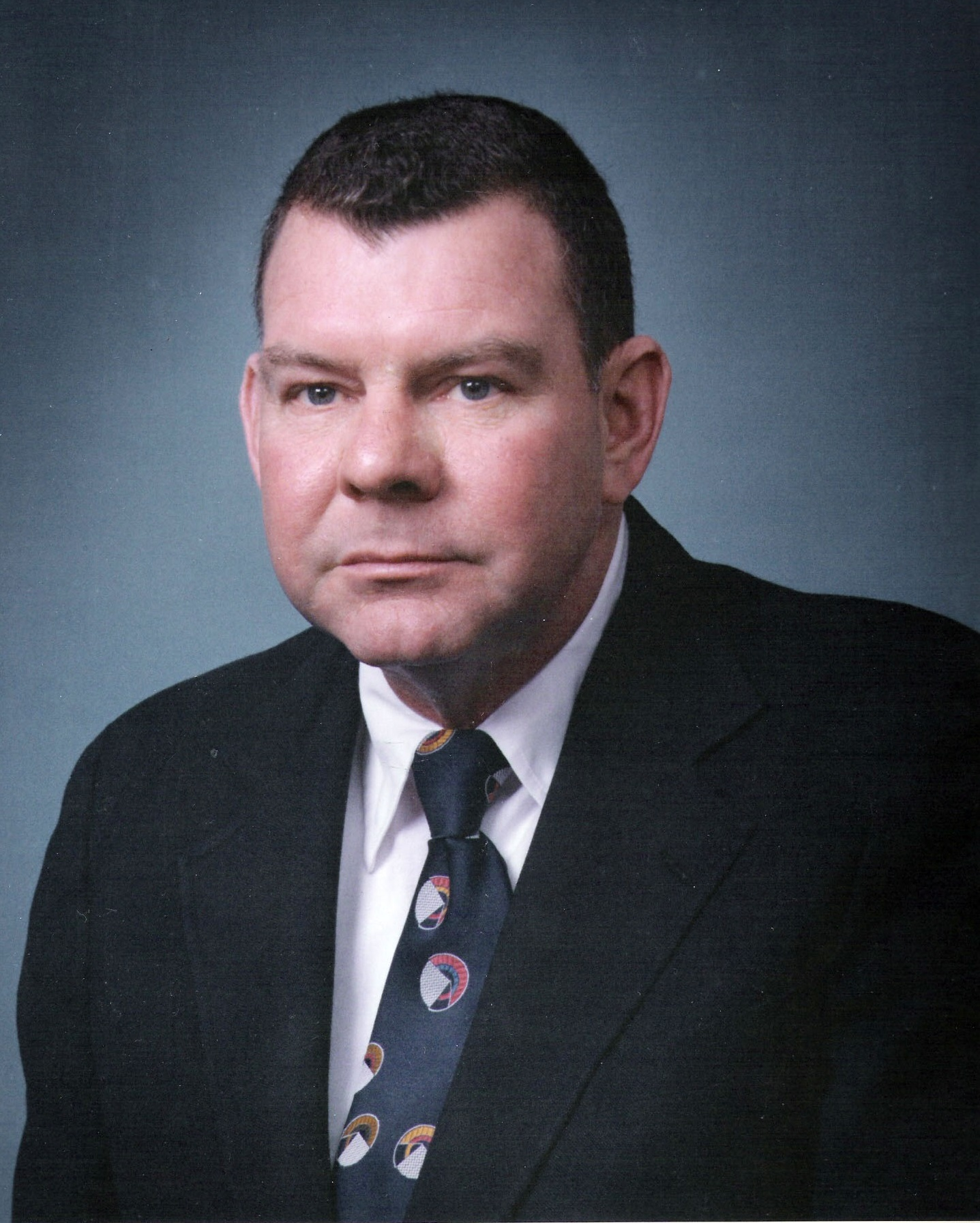

Chairman of the South Carolina Republican Party
- In office February 23, 1963 – September 15, 1965
- Preceded by: Robert F. Chapman
- Succeeded by: Harry S. Dent Sr.

Personal details
- Born: James Drake Edens, Jr. May 13, 1925 Elgin, South Carolina, U.S.
- Died: July 30, 1982 (aged 57) Isle of Palms, South Carolina, U.S.
- Cause of death: Drowning
- Resting place: Greenlawn Memorial Park in Columbia, South Carolina
- Party: Republican
- Spouse: Ferrell McCracken Edens
- Children: Jenny Edens Padgett; Robert M Edens
- Parent(s): J. Drake, Sr., and May Youmans Edens
- Education: University of South Carolina

Military service
- Branch/service: United States Marine Corps
- Years of service: 1943–1946
- Battles/wars: World War II; Asiatic-Pacific theater

James Drake Edens Jr., known as J. Drake Edens or Drake Edens (May 13, 1925 – July 30, 1982), is recognized by many as the father of the modern South Carolina Republican Party.

== Biography ==
Born in Blaney, South Carolina (now Elgin), Edens spent his entire life about the capital city of Columbia. His mother was the former May Youmans, a native of Hampton County, South Carolina. His father, Drake Sr., had developed the family farm into a supermarket chain, and Edens moved naturally into a management position within Edens Food Stores. When his career was interrupted by World War II, Edens enlisted in the United States Marine Corps and served from 1943 to 1946, seeing action in the Pacific Theater of Operations. On his return to private life, Edens married Ferrell McCracken (1923–1982), a North Carolina native whom he had met while both were serving in the Marines. Edens enrolled at the University of South Carolina at Columbia and in 1949 graduated with a degree in business administration. In 1955, Edens Food Stores merged with Winn-Dixie, and the following year Edens founded the Edens-Turbeville Agency, which he served as president from 1956 to 1964, when he sold his interest in the company to W. L. Turbeville.

Edens' political interest surfaced in 1960 when he organized a Republican club in his precinct during an exciting campaign year in which John F. Kennedy, to the great surprise of some political observers, carried South Carolina over Vice-president Richard M. Nixon. Stimulated by his entry into the world of politics, Edens served as the campaign co-chair to elect Charles E. Boineau Jr., to the South Carolina House of Representatives in 1961. Boineau became the first Republican member of the legislature in the twentieth century.

In 1962, Edens enlarged his political universe, working the entire state as chair of Republican W. D. Workman Jr.'s Senate campaign against the Democratic incumbent Olin D. Johnston. By polling a surprising 43 percent of the vote, Workman proved the viability of the Republican Party in South Carolina. On February 23, 1963, Edens was elected chairman of the Republican Party of South Carolina. At the 1964 Republican National Convention in San Francisco, Edens, as chair of South Carolina's sixteen-man delegation, cast South Carolina's votes for Barry Goldwater, putting Goldwater over the top and ensuring that he would oppose Lyndon B. Johnson in the presidential campaign. Edens chaired the Goldwater effort in South Carolina, where Goldwater proved wildly popular and received 59 percent of the vote.

During an eventful 1965, Edens sold his interest in Edens-Turbeville to work for himself in a variety of enterprises involving real estate, farming, timber management, and investments. He also chaired Albert Watson's campaign for Congress. On September 15, 1965, Edens resigned as state party chair and was elected Republican National Committeeman for South Carolina, gaining an important voice in Republican affairs at the national level.

In 1966, Edens became involved in Richard Nixon’s prospective second presidential campaign. He was the first member of the Republican National Committee to publicly support Nixon’s 1968 bid. During the fall campaign, Edens served on the national Nixon for President committee and the national Nixon Finance Committee, and also chaired South Carolina’s Nixon Finance Committee.

The public first became aware of the health problems that plagued Edens throughout the remainder of his adult life in 1968, when Edens, who suffered from chronic ulcerative colitis and rheumatoid arthritis, was forced to curtail his energetic and effective activities on behalf of the future president.

In 1972, Edens stepped down as vice-chair of the Republican National Committee. Future governor Richard Riley, in a widely popular move, appointed Edens to the South Carolina Wildlife and Marine Resources Commission. In 1979, Edens became chairman of the commission.

He drowned while swimming at the Isle of Palms on July 30, 1982. Mrs. Edens, the former Ferrell McCracken, died thirty-three days after the death of her husband on September 1, 1982.
