= Clement Haynsworth =

American judge (1912–1989)

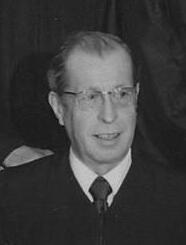
- Haynsworth in 1973

Senior Judge of the United States Court of Appeals for the Fourth Circuit
- In office April 6, 1981 – November 22, 1989

Chief Judge of the United States Court of Appeals for the Fourth Circuit
- In office December 3, 1964 – April 6, 1981
- Preceded by: Simon Sobeloff
- Succeeded by: Harrison Lee Winter

Judge of the United States Court of Appeals for the Fourth Circuit
- In office April 4, 1957 – April 6, 1981
- Appointed by: Dwight D. Eisenhower
- Preceded by: Armistead Mason Dobie
- Succeeded by: Robert F. Chapman

Personal details
- Born: Clement Furman Haynsworth Jr. October 30, 1912 Greenville, South Carolina, U.S.
- Died: November 22, 1989 (aged 77) Greenville, South Carolina, U.S.
- Education: Furman University (BA); Harvard University (LLB)

Clement Furman Haynsworth Jr. (October 30, 1912 – November 22, 1989) was a United States circuit judge of the United States Court of Appeals for the Fourth Circuit. He was also an unsuccessful nominee for the United States Supreme Court in 1969.

== Education and career ==
Born on October 30, 1912, in Greenville, South Carolina, Haynsworth received an Artium Baccalaureus degree in 1933 from Furman University and a Bachelor of Laws in 1936 from Harvard Law School. He entered private practice in Greenville from 1936 to 1942. He served in the United States Navy from 1942 to 1945. He returned to private practice in Greenville from 1945 to 1957.

== Federal judicial service ==
Haynsworth was nominated by President Dwight D. Eisenhower on February 19, 1957, to a seat on the United States Court of Appeals for the Fourth Circuit vacated by Judge Armistead Mason Dobie. He was confirmed by the United States Senate on April 4, 1957, and received a commission the same day. He served as Chief Judge and a member of the Judicial Conference of the United States from 1964 to 1981. He assumed senior status on April 6, 1981, until his death on November 22, 1989, in Greenville, South Carolina.

== Unsuccessful Supreme Court nomination ==
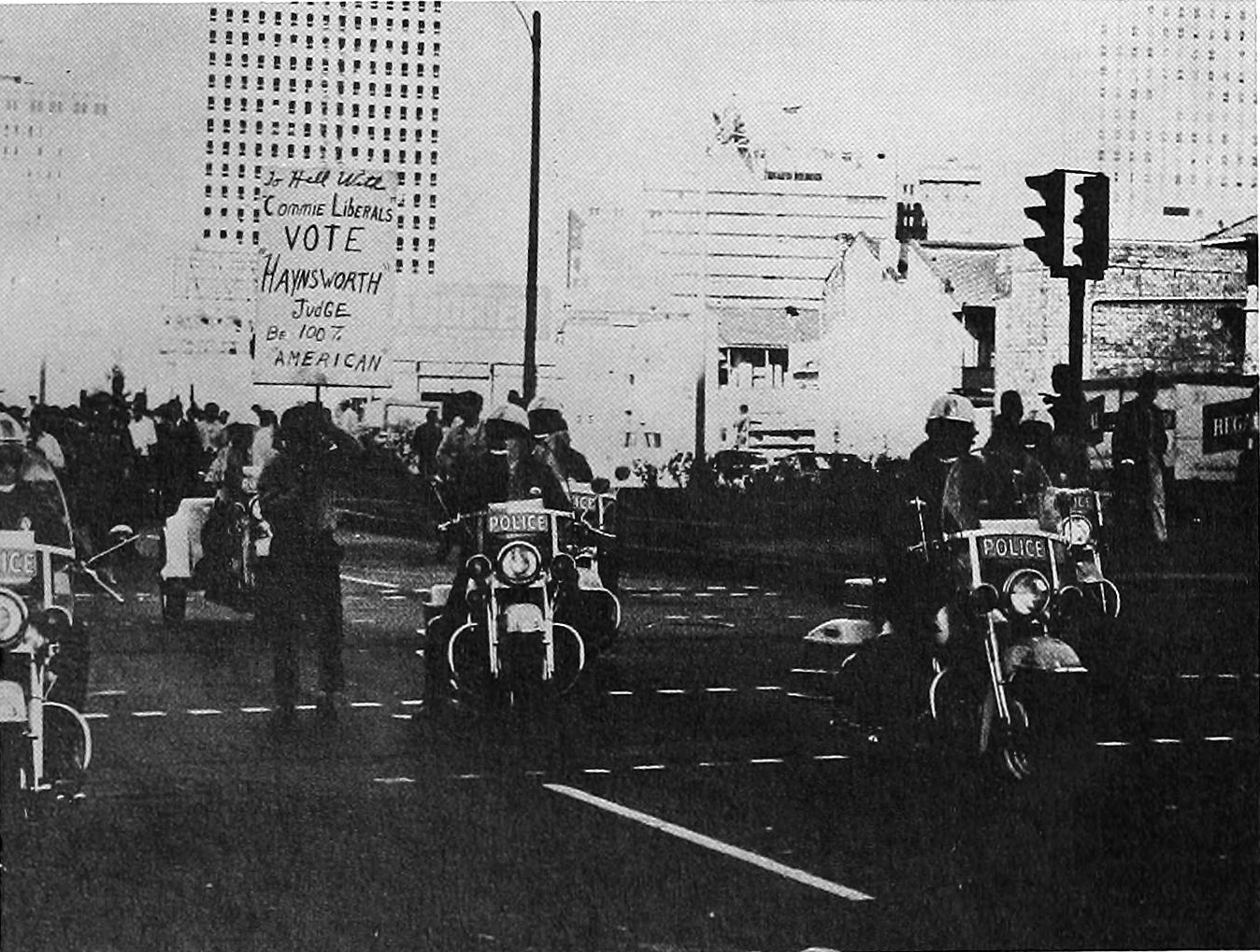
A pro-Haynsworth protester, 1970

On August 21, 1969, President Richard Nixon nominated Haynsworth to be an associate justice of the United States Supreme Court on the recommendation of South Carolina Democratic Sen. Fritz Hollings. He was proposed to succeed associate justice Abe Fortas, who had resigned over conflict of interest charges.

Haynsworth was opposed by a coalition of Democrats (possibly in retaliation for the Republicans' rejection of Fortas as Chief Justice), Rockefeller Republicans, and the NAACP. He was alleged to have made court decisions favoring segregation and of being reflexively anti-labor. Democratic United States Senator Philip Hart said that Haynsworth's decisions on civil rights and labor/management were "unacceptable", while Republican Senator Marlow Cook argued that Haynsworth was being "subjected to a character assassination that is unjustified". Cook argued that Haynsworth was "a man of honesty and a man of integrity". (Note: Alongside Winston L. Prouty, Hiram Fong, Mike Gravel, William Belser Spong and James William Fulbright, Cook was one of only six Senators who voted for Haynsworth but not for G. Harrold Carswell, who was to become Nixon’s second Supreme Court nominee rejected by the Senate.)

Controversy erupted over his rulings affirming the decision by local authorities to close the Prince Edward County schools to avoid integration, upholding the constitutionality of school voucher programs used to fund segregated private schools and supporting the management of the Darlington Manufacturing Company in South Carolina over its closing of the factory allegedly over unionization. Haynsworth was also accused of ruling in cases in which he had a financial interest, although this claim was never proved.

On October 9, 1969, after seven days of testimony the previous month, the Senate Judiciary Committee voted 10–7 to report the nomination to the full Senate with a favorable recommendation. Haynsworth's nomination was defeated by a 45–55 vote on November 21, 1969. Nineteen Democrats – of whom only Mike Gravel of Alaska represented a state outside the South – and 26 Republicans voted for Haynsworth while 38 Democrats and 17 Republicans voted against the nomination. Haynsworth was the first Supreme Court nominee to be defeated by the Senate since the rejection of Judge John J. Parker (also of the Fourth Circuit) in 1930. Nixon then nominated G. Harrold Carswell, who was also rejected by the Senate. Nixon eventually turned to Harry Blackmun, who was confirmed by the Senate.

== Honor ==
The Clement F. Haynsworth Jr. Federal Building in Greenville was renamed in his honor.

== Notes ==
Legal offices
Preceded by Armistead Mason Dobie	Judge of the United States Court of Appeals for the Fourth Circuit; 1957–1981	Succeeded by Robert F. Chapman
Preceded by Simon Sobeloff	Chief Judge of the United States Court of Appeals for the Fourth Circuit; 1964–1981	Succeeded by Harrison Lee Winter
