= Robert F. Chapman =

American judge (1926–2018)

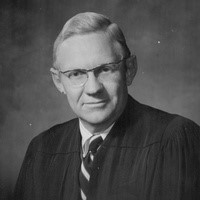

Senior Judge of the United States Court of Appeals for the Fourth Circuit
- In office May 31, 1991 – April 18, 2018

Judge of the United States Court of Appeals for the Fourth Circuit
- In office September 19, 1981 – May 31, 1991
- Appointed by: Ronald Reagan
- Preceded by: Clement Haynsworth
- Succeeded by: Karen J. Williams

Judge of the United States District Court for the District of South Carolina
- In office May 27, 1971 – October 2, 1981
- Appointed by: Richard Nixon
- Preceded by: Seat established by 84 Stat. 294
- Succeeded by: Clyde H. Hamilton

Chairman of the South Carolina Republican Party
- In office July 22, 1961 – February 15, 1963
- Preceded by: Gregory D. Shorey Jr.
- Succeeded by: Drake Edens

Personal details
- Born: Robert Foster Chapman; April 24, 1926 Inman, South Carolina, U.S.
- Died: April 18, 2018 (aged 91) Spartanburg, South Carolina, U.S.
- Party: Republican
- Education: University of South Carolina (BS, LLB)

Military service
- Branch/service: United States Navy
- Years of service: 1943–1946
- Battles/wars: World War II

Robert Foster Chapman (April 24, 1926 – April 18, 2018) was a United States circuit judge of the United States Court of Appeals for the Fourth Circuit and a former United States District Judge of the United States District Court for the District of South Carolina.

== Education and career ==
Born in Inman, South Carolina, Chapman was an ensign in the United States Navy during World War II, from 1943 to 1946. He received a Bachelor of Science degree from the University of South Carolina in 1945, and a Bachelor of Laws from University of South Carolina School of Law in 1949. He was in private practice in Spartanburg, South Carolina from 1949 to 1951, then returned to the United States Navy as a lieutenant from 1951 to 1953 before returning to private practice in Spartanburg until 1971. Chapman was elected as chairman of the South Carolina Republican Party on July 22, 1961, and served until he resigned on February 15, 1963.

=== Federal judicial service ===
On May 18, 1971, Chapman was nominated by President Richard Nixon to a new seat on the United States District Court for the District of South Carolina created by 84 Stat. 294. He was confirmed by the United States Senate on May 26, 1971, and received his commission on May 27, 1971. His service terminated on October 2, 1981, due to elevation to the Fourth Circuit.

Chapman was nominated by President Ronald Reagan on July 16, 1981, to a seat on the United States Court of Appeals for the Fourth Circuit vacated by Judge Clement Haynsworth. Chapman was confirmed by the Senate on September 16, 1981, receiving his commission on September 19, 1981. He assumed senior status on May 31, 1991, after which his seat was filled by Karen J. Williams. His service terminated on April 18, 2018, upon his death.

== See also ==
- List of United States federal judges by longevity of service

== Sources ==
Legal offices
Preceded by Seat established by 84 Stat. 294	Judge of the United States District Court for the District of South Carolina; 1971–1981	Succeeded by Clyde H. Hamilton
Preceded by Clement Haynsworth	Judge of the United States Court of Appeals for the Fourth Circuit; 1981–1991	Succeeded by Karen J. Williams
