= Karen J. Williams =

American judge (1951–2013)

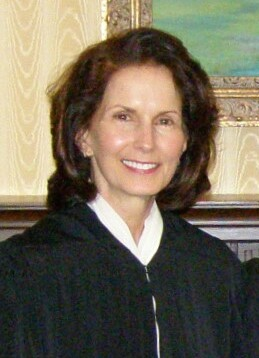
- Williams in 2008

Senior Judge of the United States Court of Appeals for the Fourth Circuit
- In office July 8, 2009 – November 2, 2013

Chief Judge of the United States Court of Appeals for the Fourth Circuit
- In office July 1, 2007 – July 8, 2009
- Preceded by: William Walter Wilkins
- Succeeded by: William Byrd Traxler Jr.

Judge of the United States Court of Appeals for the Fourth Circuit
- In office March 2, 1992 – July 8, 2009
- Appointed by: George H. W. Bush
- Preceded by: Robert F. Chapman
- Succeeded by: Henry F. Floyd

Personal details
- Born: August 4, 1951 Orangeburg, South Carolina, U.S.
- Died: November 2, 2013 (aged 62) Orangeburg, South Carolina, U.S.
- Education: Columbia College (BA); University of South Carolina School of Law (JD)

Karen Johnson Williams (August 4, 1951 – November 2, 2013) was a United States circuit judge of the United States Court of Appeals for the Fourth Circuit, appointed in 1992 and served as its Chief Judge from 2007 until her retirement in 2009. Williams was mentioned as a potential nominee to the United States Supreme Court during the administration of George W. Bush.

== Education and career ==
Born in Orangeburg, South Carolina, Williams received her Bachelor of Arts degree from Columbia College in 1972 and a Juris Doctor from the University of South Carolina School of Law in 1980. She was in private practice in Orangeburg from 1980 to 1992.

== Federal judicial service ==
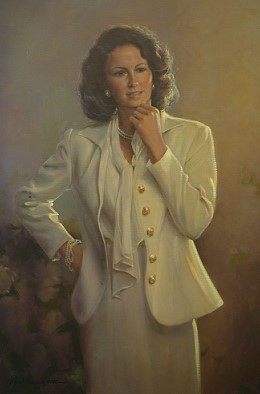
Williams's court portrait.

On January 27, 1992, Williams was nominated by President George H. W. Bush to a seat on the United States Court of Appeals for the Fourth Circuit vacated by Judge Robert F. Chapman. She was confirmed by the United States Senate on February 27, 1992, and received her commission on March 2, 1992. She served as its chief judge from 2007 to 2009.

== Illness and retirement ==
Williams assumed senior status due to a certified disability on July 8, 2009 after being diagnosed with early-onset Alzheimer's disease. She stated her desire to leave the bench while still able to perform her judicial duties, so that her future decisions would not be questioned because of her illness. She died on November 2, 2013.

== See also ==
- George W. Bush Supreme Court candidates

== Sources ==
Legal offices
Preceded by Robert F. Chapman	Judge of the United States Court of Appeals for the Fourth Circuit; 1992–2009	Succeeded by Henry F. Floyd
Preceded by William Walter Wilkins	Chief Judge of the United States Court of Appeals for the Fourth Circuit; 2007–2009	Succeeded by William Byrd Traxler Jr.
