= Julius N. Richardson =

American judge (born 1976)

Jay Richardson
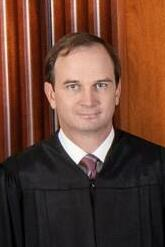
- Richardson in 2022

Judge of the United States Court of Appeals for the Fourth Circuit
- Incumbent
- Assumed office August 20, 2018
- Appointed by: Donald Trump
- Preceded by: Dennis Shedd

Personal details
- Born: Julius Ness Richardson; 1976 (age 49–50) Columbia, South Carolina, U.S.
- Party: Republican
- Relatives: Julius B. Ness (grandfather)
- Education: Vanderbilt University (BS); University of Chicago (JD)

Julius Ness "Jay" Richardson (born 1976) is an American judge and lawyer who serves as a United States circuit judge of the United States Court of Appeals for the Fourth Circuit. He was formerly an Assistant United States Attorney for the District of South Carolina.

== Early life and career ==
Richardson was born and raised in Barnwell, South Carolina. He graduated from Vanderbilt University with a Bachelor of Science in 1999. He then attended the University of Chicago Law School, where he served as articles editor of the University of Chicago Law Review and graduated in 2003 with a Juris Doctor with high honors.

After graduating from law school, Richardson served as a law clerk for Judge Richard Posner of the United States Court of Appeals for the Seventh Circuit from 2003 to 2004 and for Chief Justice William Rehnquist of the Supreme Court of the United States from 2004 to 2005. Richardson then worked for three years at Kellogg, Hansen, Todd, Figel & Frederick in Washington, D.C., where he handled complex civil litigation.

In 2009, he became an Assistant United States Attorney for the District of South Carolina, where he prosecuted criminal cases and was Deputy Criminal Chief before becoming a judge. Richardson notably prosecuted the mass murderer Dylann Roof for his actions during the Charleston church shooting. In ten years as a prosecutor, Richardson handled other high-profile prosecutions, including the public corruption case of a 42-year sheriff, an MS-13 murder for hire, and a substantial RICO case against a chapter of the Hells Angels.

Richardson and his wife Macon have four daughters.

== Federal judicial service ==
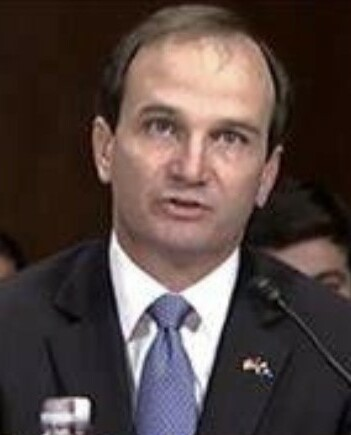
U.S. Senate Judiciary Committee hearing

On April 26, 2018, President Donald Trump announced his intent to nominate Richardson to serve as a United States Circuit Judge of the United States Court of Appeals for the Fourth Circuit. On May 7, 2018, his nomination was sent to the Senate. He was nominated to the seat vacated by Judge Dennis Shedd, who assumed senior status on January 30, 2018. On June 20, 2018, a hearing on his nomination was held before the Senate Judiciary Committee. On July 19, 2018, his nomination was reported out of committee by a 20–1 vote. On August 16, 2018, the Senate invoked cloture on Richardson's nomination by an 80–10 vote and confirmed his nomination 81–8. He received his judicial commission on August 20, 2018.

While Richardson served on the Fourth Circuit, the Court affirmed Dylann Roof's conviction and death sentence. As Richardson served as the lead prosecutor, all of the judges on the Fourth Circuit recused themselves from reviewing Roof’s case. The case was thus decided by three judges from other courts of appeal: Judges Duane Benton of the United States Court of Appeals for the Eighth Circuit, Ronald Lee Gilman of the United States Court of Appeals for the Sixth Circuit and Kent A. Jordan of the United States Court of Appeals for the Third Circuit.

== Notable cases ==
- Hirschfeld v. Bureau of Alcohol, Firearms, Tobacco & Explosives, No. 19-2250, 2021 WL 2934468 (4th Cir. July 13, 2021). Judge Richardson held that several federal laws and regulations prohibiting federally licensed firearms dealers from selling handguns to those 18-to 20-years-old violated the Second Amendment. Judge Wynn dissented. The panel subsequently vacated the decision as moot after the plaintiff turned 21.
- Harley v. Wilkinson, 988 F.3d 766 (4th Cir. 2021). The Fourth Circuit held that an as-applied Second Amendment challenge to the prohibition against possessing a firearm for a misdemeanor-domestic-violence conviction was categorically barred. Judge Richardson dissented, arguing that individuals should be allowed to bring as-applied challenges.
- Gonzalez v. Cuccinelli, 985 F.3d 357 (4th Cir. Jan. 14, 2021). A group of immigrants seeking U-Visas sued for unreasonable delay to compel agency action. Judge Richardson rejected the challenge for the pre-waiting-list work authorizations but permitted the claims of unreasonable delay in adjudicating the U-Visa petitions to go forward.
- N. Carolina State Conf. of the NAACP v. Raymond, 981 F.3d 295, 298 (4th Cir. 2020). After a federal district court enjoined North Carolina’s voter-ID law, Judge Richardson reversed the district because it had improperly flipped the burden of proof and failed to afford the General Assembly the required presumption of legislative good faith. Using the proper burden, the evidence in the record failed to meet the Challengers’ burden to show intentional race discrimination.
- Mayor of Baltimore v. Azar, 973 F.3d 258 (4th Cir. 2020). The Fourth Circuit on an initial en banc held that the Trump administration's rules barring programs receiving funds under Title X from making abortion referrals and requiring separation from abortion providers exceeded HHS’s authority and were arbitrary and capricious. Judge Richardson dissented, relying on the Supreme Court’s decision in Rust v. Sullivan that rejected similar challenges to similar regulations. The Supreme Court granted cert in the case but dismissed the case after the Biden administration indicated that it would change the challenged rules.
- Maryland Shall Issue, Inc. v. Hogan, 963 F.3d 356 (4th Cir. 2020). The Fourth Circuit held that Maryland's bump-stock ban that required citizens to forfeit their bump stocks or face up to three years in prison did not require just compensation under the Fifth Amendment's Takings Clause because the law required the bump stocks to be forfeited, not given to a third-party. In dissent, Judge Richardson explained that this was a distinction without a difference so compensation should be required.
- United States v. Curry, 965 F.3d 313 (4th Cir. 2020). An en banc court of the Fourth Circuit found that officers violated the Fourth Amendment when they stopped and asked a group of men to show that they were unarmed after hearing gunshots near their location. The Court held the stop was unconstitutional. Judge Richardson dissented, arguing that the exigent-circumstances doctrine justified the stop.
- In re: Emerson Stevens, 956 F.3d 229 (4th Cir. 2020). Judge Richardson authorized a successive federal habeas application to address newly discovered evidence. But he also focused on the executive's power and responsibility to address contested convictions. A year later, the Governor pardoned Mr. Stevens.
- United States v. Aigbekaen, 943 F.3d 713 (4th Cir. 2019). The Fourth Circuit held a border search of the cell phone of a foreign national known to be engaged in interstate sex trafficking was unconstitutional (while affirming the conviction under the good-faith exception). The search was held unlawful because it lacked the requisite “nexus” to the purposes of the border-search doctrine. Judge Richardson concurred in the judgment, arguing that the majority’s newly-created “nexus” test was inconsistent with Supreme Court precedent.
- Guzman Chavez v. Hott, 940 F.3d 867 (4th Cir. 2019). The Fourth Circuit found that the Immigration and Nationality Act required individualized bond hearings for detained immigrants awaiting withholding of removal proceedings. Judge Richardson dissented, finding that a different section governed and did not require individualized bond hearings. The Supreme Court reversed the Fourth Circuit in Johnson v. Guzman Chavez, 141 S. Ct. 2271 (2021), citing Judge Richardson's dissent.
- Casa De Maryland v. U.S. Dep't of Homeland Sec., 924 F.3d 684 (4th Cir. 2019). The Fourth Circuit held that the Trump administration's rescission of DACA was reviewable and arbitrary and capricious. Judge Richardson dissented, arguing that the rescission was part of the executive's discretion over enforcement and thus unreviewable under the APA. Judge Richardson also found that the rescission did not violate due process or equal protection.

== Memberships ==
Richardson is a member of the Federalist Society and regularly speaks to the group.

== See also ==
- List of law clerks for the chief justice of the United States

Legal offices
Preceded by Dennis Shedd	Judge of the United States Court of Appeals for the Fourth Circuit; 2018–present	Incumbent
