= Roger Gregory =

American judge (born 1953)

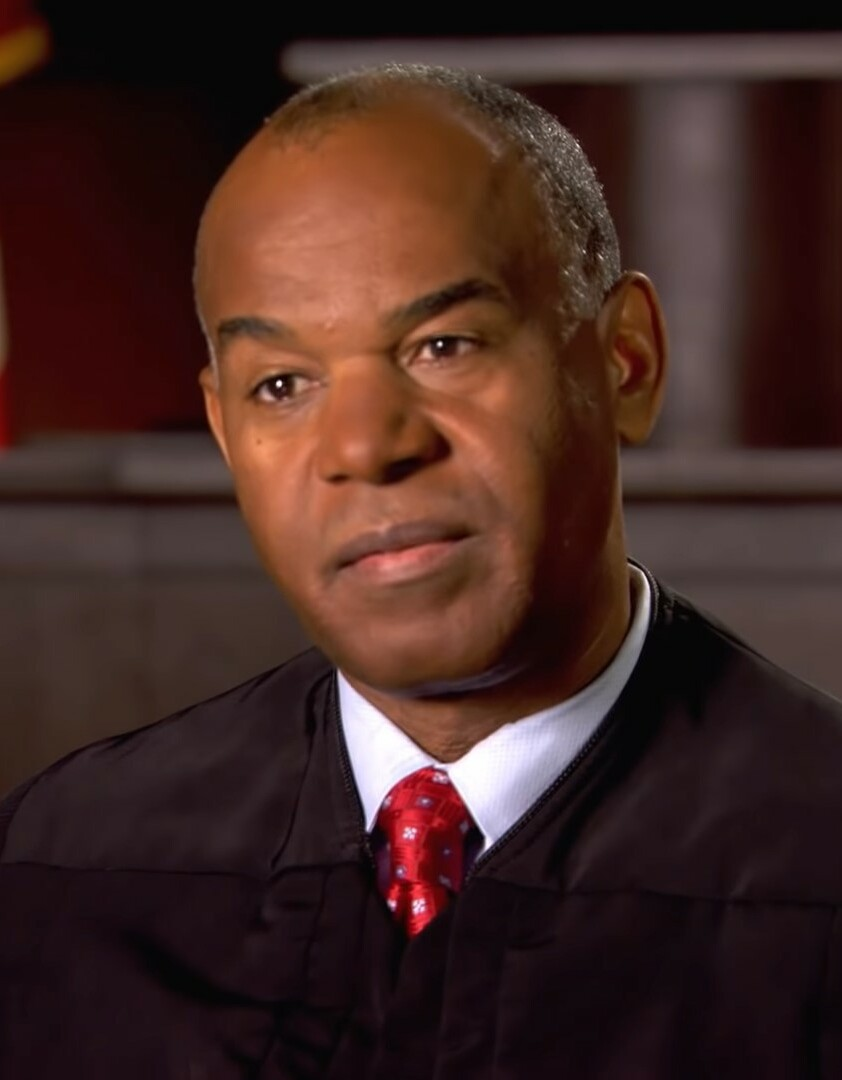
- Gregory in 2012

Chief Judge of the United States Court of Appeals for the Fourth Circuit
- In office July 8, 2016 – July 8, 2023
- Preceded by: William Byrd Traxler Jr.
- Succeeded by: Albert Diaz

Judge of the United States Court of Appeals for the Fourth Circuit
- Incumbent
- Assumed office December 27, 2000
- Appointed by: Bill Clinton (recess); George W. Bush (commission)
- Preceded by: Seat established

Personal details
- Born: Roger Lee Gregory; July 17, 1953 (age 72) Philadelphia, Pennsylvania, U.S.
- Education: Virginia State University (BA); University of Michigan (JD)

Roger Lee Gregory (born July 17, 1953) is an American lawyer who serves as a United States circuit judge of the United States Court of Appeals for the Fourth Circuit.

== Background ==
Gregory was born in Philadelphia, Pennsylvania but grew up in Petersburg, Virginia. He earned his Bachelor of Arts degree summa cum laude from Virginia State University in 1975 and his Juris Doctor from the University of Michigan Law School in 1978. He worked as an associate for Butzel Long and Hunton & Williams from 1978 until 1982. He co-founded the Richmond, Virginia law firm of Wilder & Gregory in 1982 with L. Douglas Wilder (the first African-American to be elected governor in the United States), and became the chair of its litigation section in 1985. Gregory is also a member of several fraternal organizations, including Omega Psi Phi fraternity, and Sigma Pi Phi fraternity.

=== Federal judicial service ===
On June 30, 2000, President Bill Clinton nominated Gregory to a seat on the United States Court of Appeals for the Fourth Circuit that had been vacant for close to a decade since it had been created (the Senate had never acted on Clinton's previous nominee to that seat, J. Rich Leonard). After the Senate declined to take up Gregory's nomination, and the 2000 presidential election was already over, Clinton installed Gregory on the Fourth Circuit on December 27, 2000, via a recess appointment, which would have lasted only until the end of the 2001 Congressional session. However, he was renominated by newly elected President George W. Bush on May 9, 2001.

The Senate confirmed Gregory on July 20, 2001, by a 93–1 vote, with Trent Lott of Mississippi casting the lone dissenting vote because he objected to Clinton's use of his recess appointment power. Gregory was the first judge nominated to the Fourth Circuit by Bush and confirmed by the United States Senate and is the first black judge to serve on the Fourth Circuit. He received his commission on July 25, 2001. Gregory became chief judge on July 8, 2016. and served a seven-year-term through July 8, 2023.

=== Notable opinions ===
On July 28, 2014, Gregory joined the majority opinion with Henry F. Floyd in Bostic v. Schaefer that declared Virginia's ban on same-sex marriage unconstitutional. This decision led to the legalization of same-sex marriage in Virginia as well as all other states throughout the Fourth Circuit.

On May 25, 2017, Gregory wrote for the majority when the en banc circuit upheld a lower court's injunction blocking the President's travel ban by a 10-3 vote in Int'l Refugee Assistance Project v. Trump.

In October 2017, Gregory dissented when the panel majority found that the Bladensburg Peace Cross memorial from World War I now violated the Constitution's Establishment Clause, and he wrote another dissent when the circuit denied rehearing en banc. The circuit's judgement was then reversed by the Supreme Court of the United States in American Legion v. American Humanist Association (2019).

== See also ==
- Bill Clinton judicial appointment controversies
- George W. Bush judicial appointment controversies
- List of African-American federal judges
- List of African-American jurists
- List of first minority male lawyers and judges in the United States
- List of first minority male lawyers and judges in Virginia

Legal offices
New seat	Judge of the United States Court of Appeals for the Fourth Circuit; 2000–present	Incumbent
Preceded by William Byrd Traxler Jr.	Chief Judge of the United States Court of Appeals for the Fourth Circuit; 2016–2023	Succeeded by Albert Diaz
