= Clyde H. Hamilton =

American judge (1934–2020)

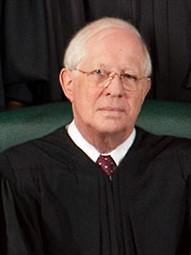

Senior Judge of the United States Court of Appeals for the Fourth Circuit
- In office November 30, 1999 – September 2, 2020

Judge of the United States Court of Appeals for the Fourth Circuit
- In office July 22, 1991 – November 30, 1999
- Appointed by: George H. W. Bush
- Preceded by: Seat established by 104 Stat. 5089
- Succeeded by: Dennis Shedd

Judge of the United States District Court for the District of South Carolina
- In office December 1, 1981 – July 31, 1991
- Appointed by: Ronald Reagan
- Preceded by: Robert F. Chapman
- Succeeded by: William Byrd Traxler Jr.

Personal details
- Born: Clyde Henry Hamilton; February 8, 1934 Edgefield, South Carolina, U.S.
- Died: September 2, 2020 (aged 86) Columbia, South Carolina, U.S.
- Education: Wofford College (BS); George Washington University Law School (JD)

Clyde Henry Hamilton (February 8, 1934 – September 2, 2020) was a Senior United States circuit judge of the United States Court of Appeals for the Fourth Circuit and a former United States district judge for the United States District Court for the District of South Carolina.

== Education and career ==
Born in Edgefield, South Carolina, Hamilton received a Bachelor of Science degree from Wofford College in 1956 and a Juris Doctor from the George Washington University Law School in 1961. He was in the United States Army as a Reserve Captain from 1956 to 1958. He was in private practice in Edgefield from 1961 to 1963, and in Spartanburg, South Carolina from 1963 to 1982.

== Federal judicial service ==
On November 13, 1981, Hamilton was nominated by President Ronald Reagan to a seat on the United States District Court for the District of South Carolina vacated by Judge Robert F. Chapman. Hamilton was confirmed by the United States Senate on November 24, 1981, and received his commission on December 1, 1981, serving until July 31, 1991.

On June 12, 1991, President George H. W. Bush nominated Hamilton for elevation to a new seat on the United States Court of Appeals for the Fourth Circuit, created by 104 Stat. 5089. He was confirmed by the United States Senate on July 18, 1991, and received his commission on July 22, 1991. He assumed senior status on November 30, 1999. Hamilton died on September 2, 2020, aged 86.

== Sources ==
Legal offices
Preceded by Robert F. Chapman	Judge of the United States District Court for the District of South Carolina; 1981–1991	Succeeded by William Byrd Traxler Jr.
Preceded by Seat established by 104 Stat. 5089	Judge of the United States Court of Appeals for the Fourth Circuit; 1991–1999	Succeeded by Dennis Shedd
