= United States v. Snider =

- Court: United States Court of Appeals for the Fourth Circuit
- Full case name: United States of America, Appellee, v. Lyle B. Snider, Appellant. United States of America, Appellee, v. Lyle B. Snider, and Sue T. Snider, Appellants.
- Argued: January 10 1974
- Decided: July 2 1974
- Citation: 502 F.2d 645, 1974 U.S. App. LEXIS 7824

Case history
- Subsequent history: Rehearing denied, reported at 502 F.2d 645 at 665.

Holding
- (1) Refusing to rise when a judge entered or exited the room was insufficient for a contempt citation. (2) Reporting 3 billion dependents on a tax form was so clearly inaccurate that it could not be considered an attempt to defraud the federal government.

Court membership
- Judges sitting: Winter, Craven and Widener

Case opinions
- Majority: Craven (opinion), joined by Winter
- Dissent: Widener

Laws applied
- 26 U.S.C. §7205 (fraudulent tax filing); 18 U.S.C. §401 (contempt of court)

United States v. Snider, 502 F.2d 645 (1972) was a case before the United States Court of Appeals for the Fourth Circuit. It was a consolidation of two separate cases: the first was a conviction for violation of 26 U.S.C. §7205, which prohibits submitting fraudulent tax information to an employer. The second was a conviction for violation of 18 U.S.C. §401, which prohibits "misbehavior ... as to obstruct the administration of justice."

On appeal, the Fourth Circuit held that the tax form was so clearly incorrect that it could not be considered an actual attempt to defraud the federal government. Thus the specific intent to violate this law was absent, and so no conviction would stand. As to the contempt charges, the court found that the appellants' actions did not obstruct the administration of justice, and so they had not violated that statue either. The court specifically declined to address the appellants' First Amendment arguments.

== Background ==
Lyle and Sue Snider were Quakers living in Chapel Hill, North Carolina. In May 1972, Lyle Snider submitted a W-4 form to his employer. This form is kept by the employer and used to determine an estimate of how much to withhold in federal income taxes. In the box for the total number of allowances he wished to take, he wrote "3 billion." He enclosed a letter with the form, which read:

Dear Friends,

We are claiming 3 billion exemptions on our W-4 form, because we are becoming more and more aware of our responsibility to our 3 billion fellow human beings all over the world. The military establishment of this country threatens the peace and security of every person on earth. Our country's military is destroying life on a horrifying scale in Southeast Asia, and it threatens to expand this destruction to other areas of the globe. Our responsibility to our fellow men leads us to resist this military establishment by refusing to pay willingly any of our tax money to it. We cannot continue to contribute money to the death and destruction which our military wreaks in Southeast Asia or to the fear which it generates in people the world over.

We also refuse to pay our taxes willingly to the U.S. Government on the ground that we are conscientiously opposed to any and all wars. We have a strong Christian faith which is the basis of our opposition to war and violence among men. We are conscientiously opposed to the use of violence to settle conflicts and we are committed to removing the causes of violent conflict. We cannot in good conscience support a government which devotes over 60 percent of its resources [648] to war. We must work to change the priorities of that government and its people. As one of the most powerful military nations on earth, we must start leading the world toward peace.

We are not trying to avoid our responsibilities to the people of this country and the world by refusing to pay our taxes. We will pay our share of money and resources to life-affirming, positive programs such as medical care, welfare, psychological care and counseling, and education, to name a few. We are called by God to affirm life and love with our resources and to resist and eliminate war and violence among men.

'In peace and love, '

/s/ Lyle Snider and Susan Snider

Lyle's employer forwarded the form and letter to the Internal Revenue Service, which launched an investigation. The IRS concluded that Snider could only claim four (for his four children), and so the form had been fraudulent. This led to Lyle's arrest on December 15, 1972. During Lyle's trial in June 1973, the Sniders refused to rise when the judge entered or exited the courtroom, as is traditional in most U.S. courts. The judge cited both of the Sniders for contempt of court.

The jury ultimately convicted Lyle Snider of submitting fraudulent tax documents to his employer. The judge imposed a sentence of eight months' imprisonment for this charge, and an additional 30 days for contempt. Sue Snider was sentenced to 10 days' imprisonment for contempt, which was suspended for two years. They appealed their convictions, and the cases were consolidated, meaning they were heard as one case for appeal purposes.

== Opinion of the court ==
=== Majority ===
==== Fraudulent tax documents ====
The court first addressed Snider's argument as to the interpretation of the wording of the statute, which prohibits "false or fraudulent" statements. The trial judge instructed the jury that a "false" statement is one that is both incorrect and known to be incorrect at the time that it was made. A "fraudulent" statement, he said, was one that was false and made with an intent to deceive. The Sniders argued in their appeal, on the other hand, that the word "false" should include the intent to deceive, or in the alternative, that "false or fraudulent" meant "false and fraudulent."

The majority explored Congress's intent in passing the law, and also looked at other examples of the phrase "false or fraudulent" in other areas of law. While the general, dictionary definition of "false" does not include the intention to deceive, courts in the past have interpreted that word to have an element of intent in it. The majority also concluded that since showing civil tax fraud via "false" statements made on an income tax return requires more than simply showing the information on the return to be wrong, the "false and fraudulent" language under which Snider was charged must require an element of intent.

The majority's opinion also looked at the meaning of the phrase "false or fraudulent" itself:

Were we to accept the government's position, as did the district judge, that "false" means "untrue" and "fraudulent" means "falsely made ... with the intent to deceive," then the phrase "or fraudulent" in 26 U.S.C. § 7205 is rendered a nullity. That which is "fraudulent" within the district judge's instructions to the jury is also, by definition, "false;" thus the government need only prove that Snider's claim was untrue and is relieved of any obligation to show that the statement is deceptive or that it was made with an intention to deceive. Such an interpretation not only renders "or fraudulent" superfluous, it may give the statute "unintended breadth" so as to make criminal an act which the Congress did not consider punishable.

The result was that the government must prove an intent to defraud the tax system, not merely that Snider made an untrue statement. The majority then concluded that Snider's claiming three billion adjustments was so clearly outside the realm of possibility that there was no way a jury could conclude that he intended to deceive his employer or the IRS into giving him credit for three billion adjustments.

==== Contempt ====
As to the contempt charges, the court first explained that the purposes of contempt are to ensure the smooth operation of court proceedings, and to protect the dignity of the court system. The majority cautioned, however, "against [judges'] confusing offenses to their sensibilities with obstruction to the administration of justice." In other words, there must be some "material obstruction" to the court's duties that is to be prevented. Even if refusing to stand is a distraction to others in the court room, "we think the fault may better be resolved by compelling silence and attention than by coercing a gesture of respect."

While declining to address the Sniders' argument that their contempt conviction violated the Free Exercise Clause, the court did suggest that a rule that refusing to stand was automatically contempt would violate citizens' rights to freedom of expression. The court quoted an earlier Supreme Court case finding that a school system could not force students to salute the American flag:

If there is any fixed star in our constitutional constellation, it is that no official, high or petty, can prescribe what shall be orthodox in politics, nationalism, religion, or other matters of opinion or force citizens to confess by word or act their faith therein. If there are any circumstances which permit an exception, they do not now occur to us.

Thus the Sniders' action did not fall within the meaning of contempt as described by the law under which they were charged, and so their convictions were dismissed.

=== Dissent ===
Judge H. Emory Widener wrote a dissenting opinion, in which he disagreed with the majority's conclusions as to both issues. He decried the majority's ruling as "fl[ying] in the face of precedent, undermin[ing] statutory law required for the administration of a voluntary tax system, and in its reversal of the contempt charges, impair[ing] the administration of justice."

==== Fraudulent tax filing ====
Judge Widener noted that the tax system in the United States is largely voluntary, and that the majority's ruling would allow those with political disagreements to escape prosecution for tax fraud:

Although the reversal of the tax conviction is thinly veiled in the guise of an improper definition of "false or fraudulent," it is in fact nothing more nor less than a ruling that a Vietnam War protester may not be required to be punished for a willful refusal to pay withholding taxes on account of a political belief.

He went on to cite cases from other circuits which had concluded that, since the crime under which Snider was charged was a misdemeanor, it was not necessary for the government to show an intent to defraud in order to secure a conviction. He concluded then that the trial judge had properly instructed the jury in the meaning of the "false or fraudulent" language. He criticized the majority's opinion for allowing political views to serve as an excuse for violating the law.

==== Contempt ====
Here, Judge Widener began by noting the trial judge's findings that there was a great deal of protest surrounding the Sniders' trial, and that the Sniders' refusal to stand was indeed disruptive. He criticized the majority's ruling as actually allowing an encroachment of the Sniders' religious beliefs and declared that "[s]uch a ruling simply adds another crack in Mr. Jefferson's wall." In other words, "the Sniders had no more business regulating affairs in the courthouse than the judge would have had regulating affairs in the meeting house."

=== Subsequent proceedings ===
As is standard practice, the case was first heard by a three-judge panel. One of the judges on the court requested that a vote be taken as to whether or not to grant a hearing en banc, which would mean that all sitting judges would re-hear the case. A majority voted against doing so, with Judges Widener (who wrote a dissenting opinion in the case, see above), Field, and Russell voting for a rehearing and joining in a brief dissenting opinion as to the decision not to re-hear, written by Judge Field.

Judge Field largely stated his support for Judge Widener's earlier dissent, and argued that the majority's opinion allowed Snider to have the best of both worlds: "to disobey, yet to be absolved of punishment for disobedience." He also added that the majority's decision regarding the contempt charge undercut the authority of "already beleaguered district judges" who must see to day-to-day trial administration, and who "do not live in the sterile and sometimes unrealistic environment of the appellate ivory tower."
