= James Focht McClure Jr. =

American judge (1931–2010)

Senior Judge of the United States District Court for the Middle District of Pennsylvania
- In office April 7, 2001 – December 17, 2010

Judge of the United States District Court for the Middle District of Pennsylvania
- In office April 30, 1990 – April 7, 2001
- Appointed by: George H. W. Bush
- Preceded by: William Joseph Nealon Jr.
- Succeeded by: John E. Jones III

Personal details
- Born: April 6, 1931 Danville, Pennsylvania
- Died: December 17, 2010 (aged 79) Danville, Pennsylvania
- Education: Amherst College (AB); University of Pennsylvania Law School (JD)

James Focht McClure Jr. (April 6, 1931 – December 17, 2010) was an American lawyer and jurist who served as a United States district judge of the United States District Court for the Middle District of Pennsylvania.

== Early life and education ==
Born in Danville, Pennsylvania, McClure went to Lewisburg High School. He earned an Artium Baccalaureus degree from Amherst College in 1952, and a Juris Doctor from the University of Pennsylvania Law School in 1957.

== Career ==
McClure served in the United States Army from 1952 to 1954 in ordnance and as an electronics instructor in Huntsville, Alabama, becoming a corporal.

McClure served as an attorney for the Office of the Legal Adviser of the Department of State from 1957 to 1958. He was in private practice in Philadelphia, Pennsylvania, from 1958 to 1961. He was also counsel for Merck & Co. from 1961 to 1965. McClure worked in private practice in Lewisburg, Pennsylvania, from 1965 to 1984 and district attorney for Union County from 1974 to 1975. He was the president judge of the Court of Common Pleas for the 17th Judicial District of Pennsylvania in Snyder and Union County from 1984 to 1990.

=== Federal judicial service ===
McClure served as a United States district judge of the United States District Court for the Middle District of Pennsylvania. McClure was nominated by President George H. W. Bush on January 24, 1990, to a seat vacated by Judge William Joseph Nealon Jr. He was confirmed by the United States Senate on April 27, 1990, and received his commission on April 30, 1990. He assumed senior status on April 7, 2001. His service was terminated on December 17, 2010, due to his death in Danville.

== Sources ==
- FJC Bio

Legal offices
Preceded by William Joseph Nealon Jr.	Judge of the United States District Court for the Middle District of Pennsylvania; 1990–2001	Succeeded by John E. Jones III
