= Henry F. Floyd =

American judge (born 1947)

Henry Floyd
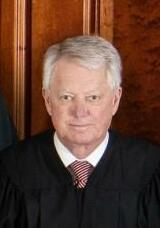
- Floyd in 2022

Senior Judge of the United States Court of Appeals for the Fourth Circuit
- Incumbent
- Assumed office December 31, 2021

Judge of the United States Court of Appeals for the Fourth Circuit
- In office October 5, 2011 – December 31, 2021
- Appointed by: Barack Obama
- Preceded by: Karen J. Williams
- Succeeded by: DeAndrea G. Benjamin

Judge of the United States District Court for the District of South Carolina
- In office September 24, 2003 – October 6, 2011
- Appointed by: George W. Bush
- Preceded by: Dennis Shedd
- Succeeded by: Mary Geiger Lewis

Personal details
- Born: Henry Franklin Floyd; November 5, 1947 (age 78) Brevard, North Carolina, U.S.
- Party: Democratic
- Education: Wofford College (BA); University of South Carolina (JD)

Henry Franklin Floyd (born November 5, 1947) is a senior United States circuit judge of the United States Court of Appeals for the Fourth Circuit.

== Early life and education ==
Born on November 5, 1947, in Brevard, North Carolina, Floyd received a Bachelor of Arts from Wofford College in 1970 and a Juris Doctor from the University of South Carolina School of Law in 1973.

== Professional career ==
Floyd served in the South Carolina House of Representatives from 1972 to 1978. He was elected as a Democrat. Floyd was in private practice in South Carolina from 1973 to 1992. He was a South Carolina Circuit Court judge, Thirteenth Judicial Circuit Court of South Carolina from 1992 to 2003.

== Federal judicial service ==
=== District court service ===
On May 15, 2003, Floyd was nominated by President George W. Bush to a seat on the United States District Court for the District of South Carolina vacated by Dennis Shedd. Floyd was confirmed by the United States Senate on September 22, 2003, and received his commission on September 24, 2003. His service terminated on October 6, 2011, due to elevation to the court of appeals.

Floyd presided over the case of José Padilla, a United States citizen detained by President Bush as an enemy combatant. In 2005, Floyd ruled that Bush did not have the authority to hold Padilla as an enemy combatant.

=== Court of appeals service ===
On January 26, 2011, President Barack Obama nominated Floyd to serve on the United States Court of Appeals for the Fourth Circuit. Floyd was recommended by Republican Senator Lindsey Graham and Democratic Representatives Jim Clyburn and John Spratt. The United States Senate confirmed Floyd on October 3, 2011, by a 96–0 vote. He received his commission on October 5, 2011. Floyd assumed senior status on December 31, 2021.

== Notable cases ==
On 28 July 2014, Floyd, in a 2–1 ruling joined by Judge Roger Gregory in Bostic v. Schaefer, struck down Virginia's ban on same-sex marriage as unconstitutional. He ruled that "Neither Virginia’s federalism-based interest in defining marriage nor our respect for the democratic process that codified that definition can excuse the Virginia Marriage Laws’ infringement of the right to marry... We recognize that same-sex marriage makes some people deeply uncomfortable. However, inertia and apprehension are not legitimate bases for denying same-sex couples due process and equal protection of the laws."

In August 2020, Floyd wrote the majority opinion in G. G. v. Gloucester County School Board. In a 2-1 decision, the court ruled for Gavin Grimm, a transgender man who had sued the Gloucester County School Board in Virginia who had prohibited him from using the boys' bathroom. Floyd wrote “At the heart of this appeal is whether equal protection and Title IX can protect transgender students from school bathroom policies that prohibit them from affirming their gender. We join a growing consensus of courts in holding that the answer is resoundingly yes.”

On September 5, 2019, Judge Floyd dissented in United States v. Curry. In a 2-1 decision, the court ruled that police officers could lawfully stop a group of African-American men walking within a field, in a "high-crime" area, after hearing gunshots and without a warrant. Judge Floyd dissented from the panel, but he eventually authored the en banc opinion before the full Fourth Circuit, which held that the police officer's actions violated the Fourth Amendment.

Legal offices
Preceded by Dennis Shedd	Judge of the United States District Court for the District of South Carolina; 2003–2011	Succeeded by Mary Geiger Lewis
Preceded by Karen J. Williams	Judge of the United States Court of Appeals for the Fourth Circuit; 2011–2021	Succeeded by DeAndrea G. Benjamin
