= Charles Boineau =

American politician (1923–2005)

Member of the South Carolina House of Representatives
- In office August 8, 1961 – 1963
- Preceded by: Tom E. Elliott

Personal details
- Born: September 27, 1923 Columbia, South Carolina, U.S.
- Died: June 1, 2005 (aged 81) Columbia, South Carolina, U.S.
- Party: Republican (after 1961); Democratic (before 1961)
- Spouse: Elizabeth Boatright Boineau
- Education: The Citadel

Military service
- Branch/service: United States Navy
- Battles/wars: World War II; Pacific Theater

Charles Evans Boineau Jr. (September 27, 1923 – June 1, 2005) was an American politician and the first Republican elected to the South Carolina House of Representatives in the twentieth century.

== Biography ==
Charles Evans Boineau Jr. was born on September 27, 1923, in Columbia, South Carolina. He was raised in Camden, South Carolina. He attended The Citadel from 1941 to 1943. He served during World War II as a naval aviator in the United States Navy in the Pacific theater.

After the war, he returned to Richland County and became involved in local politics. He was a leader of the Democrats for Nixon in the 1960 election. He joined the Republican Party and became its candidate in a 1961 election to the South Carolina House of Representatives. He ran on a platform of opposition to President John F. Kennedy's New Frontier. He won the election becoming the first Republican member of the House since 1902. He was an unsuccessful candidate for reelection in 1962 and for election in 1964. He died on June 1, 2005, in Columbia, South Carolina.

== Electoral history ==
1961 South Carolina House of Representatives special election, Richland County
Party	Candidate	Votes	%
Republican	Charles Boineau	7,333	56.05%
Democratic	Joe Berry Jr.	5,490	41.96%
States' Rights (write-in)	J. R. Hanahan	260	1.99%
Total votes		13,083	100.00
