= United States Court of Appeals for the Fourth Circuit =

Current United States federal appellate court

Coordinates: 37.53769°N 77.43481°W

- (4th Cir.)

- Location: Lewis F. Powell Jr. U.S. Courthouse (Richmond, Virginia)
- Appeals from: District of Maryland; Eastern District of North Carolina; Middle District of North Carolina; Western District of North Carolina; District of South Carolina; Eastern District of Virginia; Western District of Virginia; Northern District of West Virginia; Southern District of West Virginia
- Established: June 16, 1891
- Judges: 15
- Circuit Justice: John Roberts
- Chief Judge: Albert Diaz
- www.ca4.uscourts.gov

The United States Court of Appeals for the Fourth Circuit (in case citations, 4th Cir.) is a federal court located in Richmond, Virginia, with appellate jurisdiction over the district courts in the following districts:

- District of Maryland
- Eastern District of North Carolina
- Middle District of North Carolina
- Western District of North Carolina
- District of South Carolina
- Eastern District of Virginia
- Western District of Virginia
- Northern District of West Virginia
- Southern District of West Virginia

The court is based at the Lewis F. Powell Jr. United States Courthouse in Richmond, Virginia. With 15 authorized judgeships, it is the 4th largest circuit among the 13 United States Courts of Appeals.

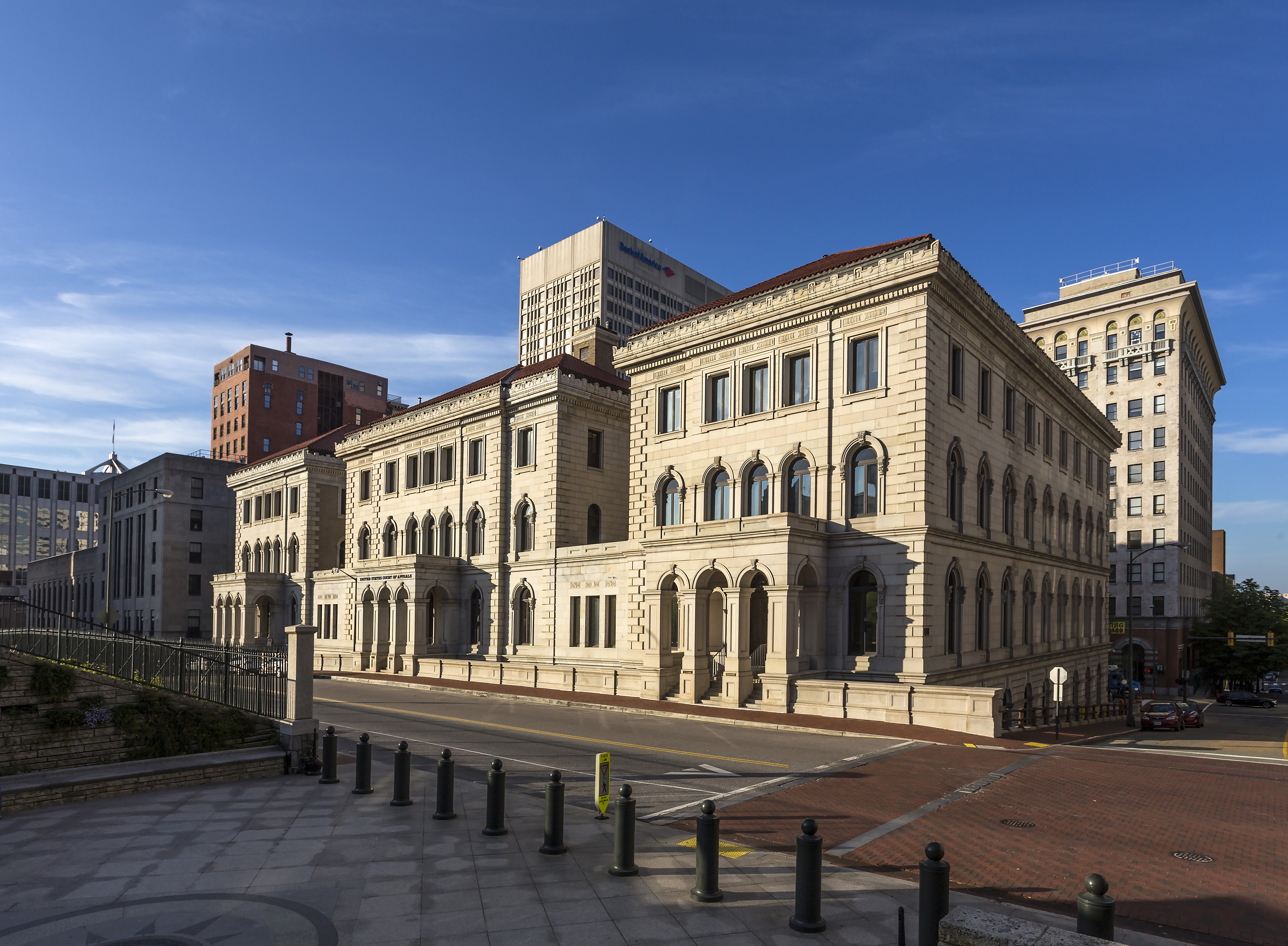
Lewis F. Powell, Jr. Courthouse

== Current composition of the court ==
As of March 19, 2024:

| # | Title | Judge | Duty station | Born | Term of service | | | Appointed by |
| # | Title | Judge | Duty station | Born | Active | Chief | Senior | Appointed by |
|---|---|---|---|---|---|---|---|---|
| 48 | Chief Judge | Albert Diaz | Charlotte, NC | 1960 | 2010–present | 2023–present | — | Obama |
| 30 | Circuit Judge | J. Harvie Wilkinson III | Charlottesville, VA | 1944 | 1984–present | 1996–2003 | — | Reagan |
| 33 | Circuit Judge | Paul V. Niemeyer | Baltimore, MD | 1941 | 1990–present | — | — | G.H.W. Bush |
| 40 | Circuit Judge | Robert Bruce King | Charleston, WV | 1940 | 1998–present | — | — | Clinton |
| 41 | Circuit Judge | Roger Gregory | Richmond, VA | 1953 | 2000–present | 2016–2023 | — | Clinton / G.W. Bush (Note: Recess appointment by Bill Clinton on December 27, 2000, re-nominated by George W. Bush on May 9, 2001 and confirmed by the United States Senate on July 20, 2001.) |
| 44 | Circuit Judge | G. Steven Agee | Salem, VA | 1952 | 2008–present | — | — | G.W. Bush |
| 47 | Circuit Judge | James Andrew Wynn | Raleigh, NC | 1954 | 2010–present | — | — | Obama |
| 50 | Circuit Judge | Stephanie Thacker | Charleston, WV | 1965 | 2012–present | — | — | Obama |
| 51 | Circuit Judge | Pamela Harris | Bethesda, MD | 1962 | 2014–present | — | — | Obama |
| 52 | Circuit Judge | Julius N. Richardson | Columbia, SC | 1976 | 2018–present | — | — | Trump |
| 53 | Circuit Judge | A. Marvin Quattlebaum Jr. | Greenville, SC | 1964 | 2018–present | — | — | Trump |
| 54 | Circuit Judge | Allison Jones Rushing | Asheville, NC | 1982 | 2019–present | — | — | Trump |
| 55 | Circuit Judge | Toby J. Heytens | Alexandria, VA | 1975 | 2021–present | — | — | Biden |
| 56 | Circuit Judge | DeAndrea G. Benjamin | Columbia, SC | 1972 | 2023–present | — | — | Biden |
| 57 | Circuit Judge | Nicole Berner | Baltimore, MD | 1965 | 2024–present | — | — | Biden |
| 38 | Senior Judge | Diana Gribbon Motz | inactive | 1943 | 1994–2022 | — | 2022–present | Clinton |
| 39 | Senior Judge | William Byrd Traxler Jr. | Greenville, SC | 1948 | 1998–2018 | 2009–2016 | 2018–present | Clinton |
| 46 | Senior Judge | Barbara Milano Keenan | Alexandria, VA | 1950 | 2010–2021 | — | 2021–present | Obama |
| 49 | Senior Judge | Henry F. Floyd | Spartanburg, SC | 1947 | 2011–2021 | — | 2021–present | Obama |

== List of former judges ==
| # | Judge | State | Born–died | Active service | Chief Judge | Senior status | Appointed by | Reason for termination |
|---|---|---|---|---|---|---|---|---|
| 1 | Hugh Lennox Bond | MD | 1828–1893 | 1891–1893 | — | — | Grant / Operation of law | death |
| 2 | Nathan Goff Jr. | WV | 1843–1920 | 1892–1913 | — | — | B. Harrison | resignation |
| 3 | Charles Henry Simonton | SC | 1829–1904 | 1893–1904 | — | — | Cleveland | death |
| 4 | Jeter Connelly Pritchard | NC | 1857–1921 | 1904–1921 | — | — | T. Roosevelt | death |
| 5 | Martin Augustine Knapp | NY | 1843–1923 | 1916–1923 | — | — | | death |
| 6 | Charles Albert Woods | SC | 1852–1925 | 1913–1925 | — | — | Wilson | death |
| 7 | Edmund Waddill Jr. | VA | 1855–1931 | 1921–1931 | — | — | Harding | death |
| 8 | John Carter Rose | MD | 1861–1927 | 1922–1927 | — | — | Harding | death |
| 9 | John J. Parker | NC | 1885–1958 | 1925–1958 | 1948–1958 | — | Coolidge | death |
| 10 | Elliott Northcott | WV | 1869–1946 | 1927–1939 | — | 1939–1946 | Coolidge | death |
| 11 | Morris Ames Soper | MD | 1873–1963 | 1931–1955 | — | 1955–1963 | Hoover | death |
| 12 | Armistead Mason Dobie | VA | 1881–1962 | 1939–1956 | — | 1956–1962 | F. Roosevelt | death |
| 13 | Simon Sobeloff | MD | 1894–1973 | 1956–1970 | 1958–1964 | 1970–1973 | Eisenhower | death |
| 14 | Clement Haynsworth | SC | 1912–1989 | 1957–1981 | 1964–1981 | 1981–1989 | Eisenhower | death |
| 15 | Herbert Boreman | WV | 1897–1982 | 1959–1971 | — | 1971–1982 | Eisenhower | death |
| 16 | Albert Vickers Bryan | VA | 1899–1984 | 1961–1972 | — | 1972–1984 | Kennedy | death |
| 17 | J. Spencer Bell | NC | 1906–1967 | 1961–1967 | — | — | Kennedy | death |
| 18 | Harrison Lee Winter | MD | 1921–1990 | 1966–1990 | 1981–1989 | 1990 | L. Johnson | death |
| 19 | James Braxton Craven Jr. | NC | 1918–1977 | 1966–1977 | — | — | L. Johnson | death |
| 20 | John D. Butzner Jr. | VA | 1917–2006 | 1967–1982 | — | 1982–2006 | L. Johnson | death |
| 21 | Donald S. Russell | SC | 1906–1998 | 1971–1998 | — | — | Nixon | death |
| 22 | John A. Field Jr. | WV | 1910–1995 | 1971–1976 | — | 1976–1995 | Nixon | death |
| 23 | Hiram Emory Widener Jr. | VA | 1923–2007 | 1972–2007 | — | 2007 | Nixon | death |
| 24 | Kenneth Keller Hall | WV | 1918–1999 | 1976–1998 | — | 1998–1999 | Ford | death |
| 25 | James Dickson Phillips Jr. | NC | 1922–2017 | 1978–1994 | — | 1994–2017 | Carter | death |
| 26 | Francis Murnaghan Jr. | MD | 1920–2000 | 1979–2000 | — | — | Carter | death |
| 27 | James Marshall Sprouse | WV | 1923–2004 | 1979–1992 | — | 1992–1995 | Carter | retirement |
| 28 | Samuel James Ervin III | NC | 1926–1999 | 1980–1999 | 1989–1996 | — | Carter | death |
| 29 | Robert F. Chapman | SC | 1926–2018 | 1981–1991 | — | 1991–2018 | Reagan | death |
| 31 | Emory M. Sneeden | NC | 1927–1987 | 1984–1986 | — | — | Reagan | resignation |
| 32 | William Walter Wilkins | SC | 1942–present | 1986–2007 | 2003–2007 | 2007–2008 | Reagan | retirement |
| 34 | Clyde H. Hamilton | SC | 1934–2020 | 1991–1999 | — | 1999–2020 | G.H.W. Bush | death |
| 35 | J. Michael Luttig | VA | 1954–present | 1991–2006 | — | — | G.H.W. Bush | resignation |
| 36 | Karen J. Williams | SC | 1951–2013 | 1992–2009 | 2007–2009 | 2009–2013 | G.H.W. Bush | death |
| 37 | M. Blane Michael | WV | 1943–2011 | 1993–2011 | — | — | Clinton | death |
| 38 | Diana Gribbon Motz | MD | 1943–present | 1994–2022 | — | 2022-2024 | Clinton | retirement |
| 42 | Dennis Shedd | SC | 1953–present | 2002–2018 | — | 2018–2022 | G.W. Bush | retirement |
| 43 | Allyson K. Duncan | NC | 1951–present | 2003–2019 | — | 2019 | G.W. Bush | retirement |
| 45 | Andre M. Davis | MD | 1949–present | 2009–2014 | — | 2014–2017 | Obama | retirement |

== Chief judges ==
Chief Judge
| Parker | 1948–1958 |
| Sobeloff | 1958–1964 |
| Haynsworth | 1964–1981 |
| Winter | 1981–1989 |
| Ervin III | 1989–1996 |
| Wilkinson III | 1996–2003 |
| Wilkins | 2003–2007 |
| Williams | 2007–2009 |
| Traxler, Jr. | 2009–2016 |
| Gregory | 2016–2023 |
| Diaz | 2023–present |

Chief judges have administrative responsibilities with respect to their circuits, and preside over any panel on which they serve, unless the circuit justice (the Supreme Court justice responsible for the circuit) is also on the panel. Unlike the Supreme Court, where one justice is specifically nominated to be chief, the office of chief judge rotates among the circuit judges.

To be chief, a judge must have been in active service on the court for at least one year, be under the age of 65, and have not previously served as chief judge. A vacancy is filled by the judge highest in seniority among the group of qualified judges, with seniority determined first by commission date, then by age. The chief judge serves for a term of seven years, or until age 70, whichever occurs first. If no judge qualifies to be chief, the youngest judge over the age of 65 who has served on the court for at least one year shall act as chief until another judge qualifies. If no judge has served on the court for more than a year, the most senior judge shall act as chief. Judges can forfeit or resign their chief judgeship or acting chief judgeship while retaining their active status as a circuit judge.

When the office was created in 1948, the chief judge was the longest-serving judge who had not elected to retire, on what has since 1958 been known as senior status, or declined to serve as chief judge. After August 6, 1959, judges could not become or remain chief after turning 70 years old. The current rules have been in operation since October 1, 1982.

== Succession of seats ==
The court has fifteen seats for active judges, numbered in the order in which they were initially filled. Judges who assume senior status enter a kind of retirement in which they remain on the bench but vacate their seats, thus allowing the U.S. President to appoint new judges to fill their seats.

Seat 1
Established on December 10, 1869 by the Judiciary Act of 1869 as a circuit judgeship for the Fourth Circuit
Reassigned on June 16, 1891 to the United States Circuit Court of Appeals for the Fourth Circuit by the Judiciary Act of 1891
| Bond | MD | 1891–1893 |
| Simonton | SC | 1893–1904 |
| Pritchard | NC | 1904–1921 |
| Waddill, Jr. | VA | 1921–1931 |
| Soper | MD | 1932–1955 |
| Sobeloff | MD | 1956–1970 |
| Russell | SC | 1971–1998 |
| Traxler, Jr. | SC | 1998–2018 |
| Quattlebaum, Jr. | SC | 2018–present |

Seat 2
Established on June 16, 1891 by the Judiciary Act of 1891
| Goff, Jr. | WV | 1892–1913 |
| Woods | SC | 1913–1925 |
| Parker | NC | 1925–1958 |
| Boreman | WV | 1959–1971 |
| Field, Jr. | WV | 1971–1976 |
| Hall | WV | 1976–1998 |
| King | WV | 1998–present |

Seat 3
Established on September 14, 1922 by 42 Stat. 837
| Rose | MD | 1922–1927 |
| Northcott | WV | 1927–1939 |
| Dobie | VA | 1940–1956 |
| Haynsworth | SC | 1957–1981 |
| Chapman | SC | 1981–1991 |
| Williams | SC | 1992–2009 |
| Floyd | SC | 2011–2021 |
| Benjamin | SC | 2023–present |

Seat 4
Established on May 19, 1961 by 75 Stat. 80
| Bryan | VA | 1961–1972 |
| Widener, Jr. | VA | 1972–2007 |
| Keenan | VA | 2010–2021 |
| Heytens | VA | 2021–present |

Seat 5
Established on May 19, 1961 by 75 Stat. 80
| Bell | NC | 1961–1967 |
| Butzner, Jr. | VA | 1967–1982 |
| Wilkinson III | VA | 1984–present |

Seat 6
Established on March 18, 1966 by 80 Stat. 75
| Winter | MD | 1966–1990 |
| Niemeyer | MD | 1990–present |

Seat 7
Established on March 18, 1966 by 80 Stat. 75
| Craven, Jr. | NC | 1966–1977 |
| Phillips, Jr. | NC | 1978–1994 |
| Wynn | NC | 2010–present |

Seat 8
Established on October 20, 1978 by 92 Stat. 1629
| Murnaghan, Jr. | MD | 1979–2000 |
| Davis | MD | 2009–2014 |
| Harris | MD | 2014–present |

Seat 9
Established on October 20, 1978 by 92 Stat. 1629
| Sprouse | WV | 1979–1992 |
| Michael | WV | 1993–2011 |
| Thacker | WV | 2012–present |

Seat 10
Established on October 20, 1978 by 92 Stat. 1629
| Ervin III | NC | 1980–1999 |
| Duncan | NC | 2003–2019 |
| Rushing | NC | 2019–present |

Seat 11
Established on July 10, 1984 by 98 Stat. 333
| Sneeden | NC | 1984–1986 |
| Wilkins | SC | 1986–2007 |
| Diaz | NC | 2010–present |

Seat 12
Established on December 1, 1990 by 104 Stat. 5089
| Hamilton | SC | 1991–1999 |
| Shedd | SC | 2002–2018 |
| Richardson | SC | 2018–present |

Seat 13
Established on December 1, 1990 by 104 Stat. 5089
| Luttig | VA | 1991–2006 |
| Agee | VA | 2008–present |

Seat 14
Established on December 1, 1990 by 104 Stat. 5089
| Motz | MD | 1994–2022 |
| Berner | MD | 2024–present |

Seat 15
Established on December 1, 1990 by 104 Stat. 5089
| Gregory | VA | 2000–present |

== Practice in the 4th Circuit ==
From 2000 to 2008, the Court had the highest rate of non-publication (92%) on the Federal Circuit.

The Chief Justice is always assigned to the Fourth Circuit as the circuit justice, due to Richmond's close proximity to Washington, D.C. (Note: Under the original Judiciary Act of 1789 and subsequent acts, the justices of the Supreme Court of the United States in Washington, D.C. had the responsibility of "riding circuit" and personally hearing both appeals and trials in the circuit courts, in addition to their caseload back in the capital. This duty was reasonable when the United States consisted of the original Thirteen Colonies along the East Coast of the United States, but became increasingly onerous and impractical with the country's rapid westward expansion during the 19th century, and was repealed by Congress with the enacting of the Judiciary Act of 1891. The U.S. Supreme Court justices still retain vestiges of the days of riding circuit; each justice is designated to hear certain interlocutory appeals from specific circuits and can unilaterally decide them or refer them to the entire court. The court's customary summer recess originated as the time during which the justices would leave Washington and ride circuit (since dirt roads were more passable in the summer).)

The Fourth Circuit is considered an extremely collegial court. By tradition, the judges of the Fourth Circuit come down from the bench following each oral argument to greet the lawyers.

== Case law ==
- Bliley v. West, 42 F.2d 101 (1930)
- United States v. Snider, 502 F.2d 645 (1972)

== See also ==
- Judicial appointment history for the Fourth Circuit
- List of current United States circuit judges
- Same-sex marriage in the Fourth Circuit
