= Dennis Shedd =

American judge (born 1953)

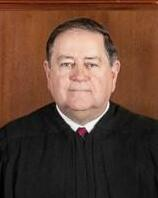
- Shedd in 2022

Senior Judge of the United States Court of Appeals for the Fourth Circuit
- In office January 30, 2018 – May 2, 2022

Judge of the United States Court of Appeals for the Fourth Circuit
- In office November 26, 2002 – January 30, 2018
- Appointed by: George W. Bush
- Preceded by: Clyde H. Hamilton
- Succeeded by: Julius N. Richardson

Judge of the United States District Court for the District of South Carolina
- In office October 30, 1990 – December 10, 2002
- Appointed by: George H. W. Bush
- Preceded by: Karen L. Henderson
- Succeeded by: Henry F. Floyd

Personal details
- Born: Dennis Wayne Shedd; January 28, 1953 (age 72) Cordova, South Carolina, U.S.
- Education: Wofford College (BA); University of South Carolina (JD); Georgetown University (LLM)

Dennis Wayne Shedd (born January 28, 1953) is a former United States circuit judge of the United States Court of Appeals for the Fourth Circuit.

== Background ==
Shedd attended Orangeburg Preparatory Schools in Orangeburg, South Carolina. He received his Bachelor of Arts degree from Wofford College, his Juris Doctor from the University of South Carolina School of Law and a Master of Laws from the Georgetown University Law Center. He went on to become chief counsel and staff director for the Senate Committee on the Judiciary while in the employ of Senator Strom Thurmond. He moved to South Carolina to practice law in 1988. During that time, he served as an adjunct professor of law at the University of South Carolina School of Law.

== Federal judicial service ==
=== Service on district court ===
President George H. W. Bush nominated Shedd on October 17, 1990, to the United States District Court for the District of South Carolina. Shedd was confirmed on October 27, 1990. He received his commission on October 30, 1990. His service as a district court judge was terminated on December 10, 2002, when he was elevated to the court of appeals.

=== Service on court of appeals ===
Shedd was nominated by President George W. Bush on September 4, 2001, and was confirmed by the United States Senate on November 19, 2002, by a 55–44 vote. He received his judicial commission on November 26, 2002. Shedd assumed senior status on January 30, 2018. He retired from the court on May 2, 2022.

== Notable decisions ==
In 2007, Judge Shedd wrote for a fractured panel which found that the procedural default doctrine prevented the court from hearing the constitutional claims of a death row inmate. On May 25, 2017, Judge Shedd wrote a dissent when the en banc circuit upheld a lower court's injunction against the president's travel ban by a vote of 10–3 in Int'l Refugee Assistance Project v. Trump.

== Sources ==
Legal offices
Preceded by Karen L. Henderson	Judge of the United States District Court for the District of South Carolina; 1990–2002	Succeeded by Henry F. Floyd
Preceded by Clyde H. Hamilton	Judge of the United States Court of Appeals for the Fourth Circuit; 2002–2018	Succeeded by Julius N. Richardson
