= William Byrd Traxler Jr. =

American judge (born 1948)

William Traxler
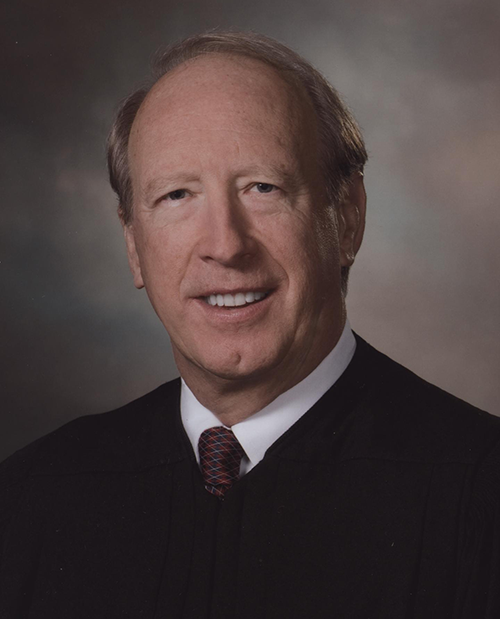

Senior Judge of the United States Court of Appeals for the Fourth Circuit
- Incumbent
- Assumed office August 31, 2018

Chief Judge of the United States Court of Appeals for the Fourth Circuit
- In office July 8, 2009 – July 8, 2016
- Preceded by: Karen J. Williams
- Succeeded by: Roger Gregory

Judge of the United States Court of Appeals for the Fourth Circuit
- In office October 1, 1998 – August 31, 2018
- Appointed by: Bill Clinton
- Preceded by: Donald S. Russell
- Succeeded by: A. Marvin Quattlebaum Jr.

Judge of the United States District Court for the District of South Carolina
- In office March 2, 1992 – October 21, 1998
- Appointed by: George H. W. Bush
- Preceded by: Clyde H. Hamilton
- Succeeded by: Margaret B. Seymour

Personal details
- Born: William Byrd Traxler Jr. May 1, 1948 (age 78) Greenville, South Carolina, U.S.
- Education: Davidson College (BA); University of South Carolina (JD)

William Byrd Traxler Jr. (born May 1, 1948) is an American jurist who currently serves as a senior United States circuit judge of the United States Court of Appeals for the Fourth Circuit.

== Early life and education ==
Traxler was born in Greenville, South Carolina. He earned his Bachelor of Arts degree from Davidson College in 1970 and his Juris Doctor from the University of South Carolina School of Law in 1973.

== Professional career ==
Traxler worked in the office of United States Army Reserve Adjutant General, from 1970 to 1978. He practiced private law in Greenville from 1973 to 1974 before working as a criminal prosecutor in the Office of the solicitor for South Carolina's 13th Judicial Circuit from 1975 to 1981.

From 1981 to 1985, he served as solicitor for the 13th Judicial Circuit, where he was the circuit's chief criminal prosecutor. In 1985, Traxler was elected by the General Assembly of South Carolina to be a state circuit court judge, where he served until becoming a federal judge in 1992.

== Federal judicial service ==
Traxler was nominated by President George H. W. Bush in 1991, to a seat on the United States District Court for the District of South Carolina vacated by Clyde H. Hamilton. He was confirmed by the United States Senate on February 27, 1992, and received his commission on March 2, 1992. His service terminated on October 21, 1998, due to elevation to the court of appeals.

Traxler presided over a significant First Amendment case, Hall vs. Marion School District 2. In 1993, Judge Traxler ruled in favor of the plaintiff in this important case. He ruled that defendant Mullins District 2 acted illegally in firing a teacher for exercising free speech in criticizing her superintendent and school board. The school district appealed the case to the 4th Circuit Court of Appeals which affirmed. The case became one of the most important First Amendment cases to be decided by the 4th Circuit in over a decade. [Just Shut Up and Teach: First Amendment Under Fire chronicles the lawsuit.]

On July 10, 1998, President Bill Clinton nominated Traxler to the United States Court of Appeals for the Fourth Circuit to replace Judge Donald Stuart Russell, who had died on February 22, 1998. The Senate confirmed Traxler by a voice vote on September 28, 1998. He received his commission on October 1, 1998. On the retirement of Chief Judge Karen J. Williams in July 2009, Traxler became the Chief Judge of the 4th Circuit Court. While he was serving as the chief judge, Traxler joined the Charleston School of Law as a distinguished visiting professor of law in 2009. In February 2013, Chief Justice John Roberts named Traxler the chair of the executive committee of the Judicial Conference of the United States. Traxler's term as the chief judge ended on July 8, 2016, and he was succeeded by Judge Roger Gregory. Traxler assumed senior status on August 31, 2018.

Legal offices
Preceded by Clyde H. Hamilton	Judge of the United States District Court for the District of South Carolina; 1992–1998	Succeeded by Margaret B. Seymour
Preceded by Donald S. Russell	Judge of the United States Court of Appeals for the Fourth Circuit; 1998–2018	Succeeded by A. Marvin Quattlebaum Jr.
Preceded by Karen J. Williams	Chief Judge of the United States Court of Appeals for the Fourth Circuit; 2009–2016	Succeeded by Roger Gregory
