= List of College of Charleston people =

This list contains people associated with the College of Charleston in Charleston, South Carolina, including current and former college presidents, as well as notable alumni and faculty members.

== Alumni ==
=== Actors ===
- Erick Avari - actor (The Mummy, Daredevil, Mr. Deeds and Heroes)
- Matt Czuchry, class of 1999 - actor (Gilmore Girls, The Good Wife and The Resident)
- Jennifer Ferrin - actor (nominated for a Daytime Emmy in 2005 and 2006 for As the World Turns; also known for work on Sex and the City 2, The Following, and Hell on Wheels)
- Thomas Gibson - actor (Far and Away, Dharma and Greg [for which he was twice nominated for a Golden Globe Award, Chicago Hope, and Criminal Minds)
- Orlando Jones - actor (MADtv, The Replacements, Magnolia, Evolution, and Sleepy Hollow)
- Ryan Masson - actor (The Last Stop in Yuma County, Proximity, Frontier Crucible)
- Allison Munn, class of 1997 - actor (What I Like About You, That '70s Show, and One Tree Hill)

=== Artists and architects ===
- Christopher Boffoli, class of 1993 - fine art photographer
- Ben Hollingsworth, class of 2004 - former professional soccer player, abstract artist and sculptor
- Samuel Lapham VI, class of 1913 - architect with the firm Simons & Lapham (1920–1972), which designed the west wing of Randolph Hall/Chemistry Wing (1930), the Student Activities Building (1939), Craig Dormitory and Cafeteria (1962), Robert Smalls Library (1972) and Cougar Mall
- Francis D. Lee, class of 1846 - architect and inventor; several of his buildings are on the National Register for Historic Places
- Robert Mills (1781–1855) - studied at the College in the late 18th century; first American-born man to be professionally trained as an architect; designed the Washington Monument, Department of Treasury building, and U.S. Patent Office Building
- Brian Rutenberg, class of 1987 - abstract painter

=== Athletes ===
- Jarrell Brantley - professional basketball player for the Utah Jazz
- Joe Chealey - professional basketball player for the Charlotte Hornets
- Taylor Clarke - professional baseball player for the Kansas City Royals
- Dontaye Draper - professional basketball player, named Eurocup MVP in 2011
- Brett Gardner, class of 2005 - professional baseball player for the New York Yankees
- Andrew Goudelock - professional basketball player for Maccabi Tel Aviv of the Israeli Premier League and the Euroleague; drafted by the Los Angeles Lakers, 2014 Eurocup MVP
- Heath Hembree - professional baseball player; played for the San Francisco Giants and the Boston Red Sox
- Anthony Johnson, class of 1997 - professional basketball player; first player in College of Charleston history selected in the NBA draft; spent 14 seasons (1997–2010) in the NBA and played for seven teams
- Wes Knight - professional soccer player for the FC Edmonton
- Michael Kohn - professional baseball player for the Los Angeles Angels
- Andrew Lawrence, class of 2013 - professional basketball player, played for Great Britain Olympic Team in 2012
- Oliver Marmol - professional baseball manager St. Louis Cardinals
- John Meeks (born 1999) - basketball player in the Israeli Basketball Premier League
- Bailey Ober - professional baseball player for the Minnesota Twins

=== Musicians ===
- Cary Ann Hearst, class of 2001 - vocals, guitar, drums, keyboard, and percussion with Shovels & Rope; her song "Hell's Bells" was featured on HBO's True Blood; at 2013 Americana Music Honors & Awards, Shovels & Rope received awards of Emerging Artist of the Year and Song of the Year for their song "Birmingham"
- Edwin McCain - pop singer-songwriter

=== Politicians ===
- Mendel Davis, class of 1966 - Democrat, United States House of Representatives representing the First Congressional District of South Carolina (1971–1981)
- Casey DeSantis, class of 2003 - news reporter and First Lady of Florida
- James B. Edwards, class of 1950 - oral surgeon; former governor of South Carolina; secretary of energy under President Ronald Reagan; president of the Medical University of South Carolina
- John Charles Frémont, class of 1836 - "the Great Pathfinder;" explored the West in the 1830s and 1840s;an outspoken opponent of slavery; in 1856 the first Republican nominee for president; major general for the Union during the Civil War; in 1861, issued a proclamation (overturned by President Lincoln) freeing slaves; later governor of Arizona
- John Geddes, class of 1795 - 22nd governor of South Carolina (1818–1820)
- James E. Gonzales, class of 1956 - member of the South Carolina House of Representatives
- Burnet R. Maybank, class of 1919 - mayor of Charleston; 99th governor of South Carolina; U.S. Senator for South Carolina 1941–1954; chaired the Senate Finance Committee; played a key role in the development of the New Deal; namesake of Maybank Hall, one of the main academic buildings on campus
- Glenn McConnell, class of 1969 - attorney; influential force in South Carolina politics for more than two decades; elected to public office in 1981; president pro tempore of the South Carolina Senate from 2001 until he replaced the disgraced Ken Ard as the state's Lieutenant Governor; namesake of McConnell Residence Hall dormitory; president of the College of Charleston 2014–2018
- Darline Graham, class of 1989 - U.S. senator from South Carolina (2026–present); younger sister of former U.S. Senator Lindsey Graham
- Arthur Ravenel, class of 1950 - real estate developer; member of the South Carolina House of Representatives, South Carolina senator (1980–1986); elected to the U.S. House of Representatives in 1986; returned to the South Carolina Senate in 1996, serving until 2005; elected to the Charleston School Board in 2006, at age 79; namesake of the bridge connecting Charleston to Mt. Pleasant
- Nick Shalosky, class of 2010 - first openly gay elected official in South Carolina; serves downtown Charleston on the District 20 Constituent School Board
- Julius Waties Waring, class of 1900 - U.S. federal judge who played an important role in the early legal battles of the American Civil Rights Movement
- Madeleine Westerhout, class of 2013 - former personal secretary to the president and director of Oval Office Operations for the Trump Administration

=== Writers ===
- Paul Hamilton Hayne, class of 1852 - poet, critic and editor
- Ludwig Lewisohn, class of 1901 - novelist, translator and literary and drama critic; founding professor of Brandeis University
- Padgett Powell, class of 1974 - writer and novelist
- Louis D. Rubin, Jr. - literary scholar and critic, writing teacher, publisher, and writer
- Miles Smith, class of 2006 - historian and author
- Catherine Mann, class of 1985 - USA Today bestselling novelist, winner of the RITA Award, novels translated/released in more than twenty countries

=== Others ===
- Frank Blair (1915–1995), class of 1934 - early cast member of NBC's The Today Show, newsman and anchor, 1953-1975
- Millicent Brown, class of 1975 - civil rights activist
- Andrew Dana, class of 2008 - restaurateur
- Buist M. Fanning, class of 1970 - translator of the 1995 update to the New American Standard Bible
- William Plumer Jacobs, class of 1861, minister and founder of Presbyterian College and Thornwell Orphanage
- James Jervey (1785–1845) - lawyer, banker, and slave trader
- Harriet McBryde Johnson, M.P.A., 1981 - author, attorney, and disability rights activist
- Arlinda Locklear, class of 1973 - lawyer, first Native American woman to argue a case before the U.S. Supreme Court
- George B. Rabb, class of 1951 - zoologist, president emeritus of the Chicago Zoological Society and former director of the Brookfield Zoo in Chicago
- Jackie Sumell, class of 1996 - artist and social activist for ending solitary confinement in the U.S. prison system
- Carol Hannah Whitfield, class of 2007 - fashion designer; finalist on the sixth season of Project Runway
- Nafees Bin Zafar, class of 1998 - recipient of two Academy Awards for special effects (2007 and 2015), principal engineer at DreamWorks Animation (Pirates of the Caribbean: At World's End, Shrek Forever After, Kung Fu Panda 2)

== Faculty ==
=== Current ===
- Bret Lott - professor of English, best-selling writer

=== Former ===
- Alison Piepmeier - professor of Women's and Gender Studies, known for her zine scholarship
