= Brett Gardner =

American baseball player (born 1983)

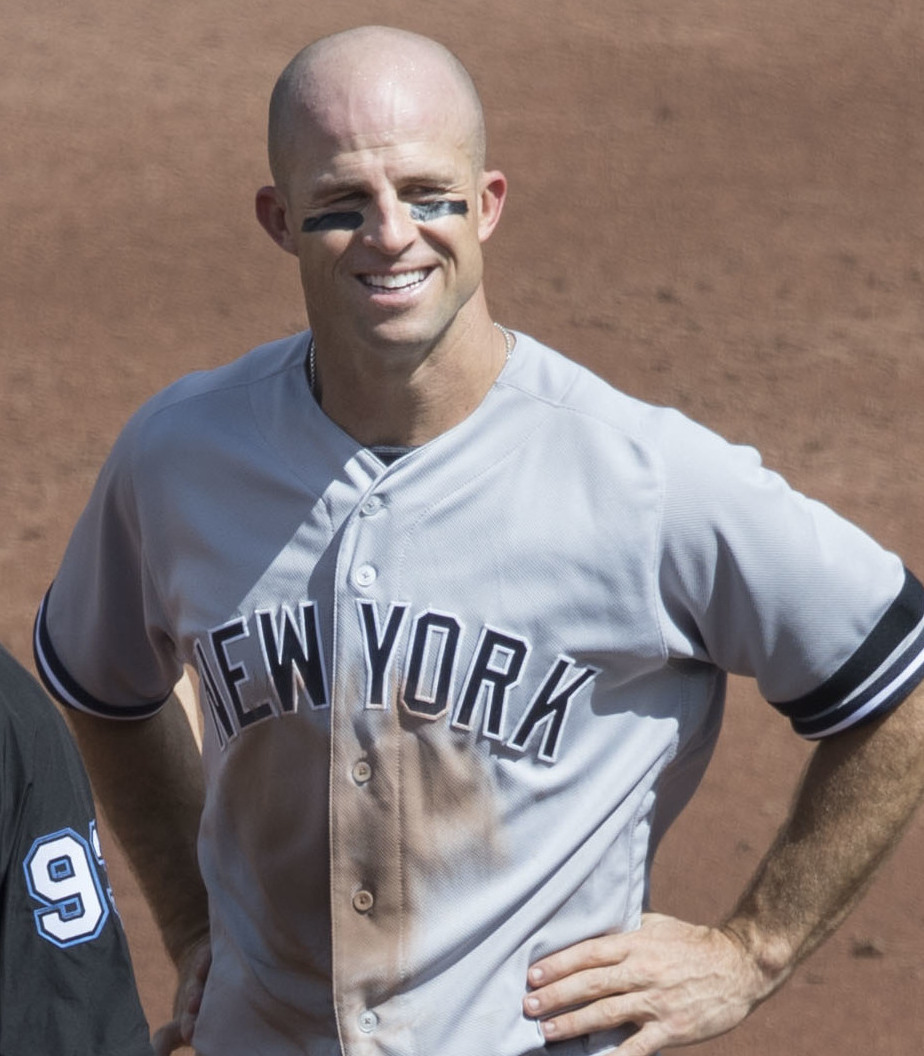
- Gardner with the New York Yankees in 2017
- Outfielder
- Born: August 24, 1983 (age 43); Holly Hill, South Carolina, U.S.
- Batted: Left Threw: Left

MLB debut
- June 30, 2008, for the New York Yankees

Last MLB appearance
- October 3, 2021, for the New York Yankees

MLB statistics
- Batting average: .256
- Home runs: 139
- Runs batted in: 578
- Stolen bases: 274
- Stats at Baseball Reference

Teams
- New York Yankees (2008–2021)

Career highlights and awards
- All-Star (2015); World Series champion (2009); Gold Glove Award (2016); AL stolen base leader (2011)

Brett Michael Gardner (born August 24, 1983) is an American former professional baseball outfielder who spent his entire 14-year Major League Baseball (MLB) career with the New York Yankees.

Gardner was a walk-on for the College of Charleston's baseball team. Selected by the Yankees in the third round of the 2005 MLB draft, Gardner made his MLB debut with the Yankees in 2008 and was part of the Yankees' 2009 World Series championship team that beat the Philadelphia Phillies. Gardner led the American League in stolen bases in 2011 and in triples in 2013. He was named an All-Star in 2015 and won a Gold Glove Award in 2016. Gardner also won three Fielding Bible Awards.

Gardner was a major leader in the Yankees' clubhouse during his tenure and developed into a fan favorite due to his tenacity, grit, and blue-collar approach. When top prospect Anthony Volpe made the Yankees' roster in 2023, he was offered the number 11 by the team, but he called Gardner for the veteran's blessing before accepting his old number, which Gardner happily obliged.

== Amateur career ==
Gardner attended Holly Hill Academy in Holly Hill, South Carolina, where he played for the school's baseball team. He also played American Legion Baseball for St. George Post 105.

Gardner attended walk-on tryouts for the baseball team at the College of Charleston in 2001. Gardner made the team and became a three-year starter for the College of Charleston Cougars. Gardner had a .397 batting average in 2004, his junior year, but he was not selected in the 2004 MLB draft. In 2005, his senior year, he batted .447, tied for the most hits in college baseball with 122, established a Cougars record with 85 runs scored, and led the Southern Conference with 38 stolen bases.

== Professional career ==
=== Minor leagues ===
After his senior year in college, the New York Yankees selected Gardner in the third round, with the 109th overall selection, of the 2005 Major League Baseball draft. Gardner received a $210,000 signing bonus.

Gardner finished the 2005 season in the New York–Penn League season ranking 268th in at bats (with 282), 54th in runs (62), and 78th in stolen bases (19). He was a Florida State League All Star in 2006, batting .323 in 63 games with 22 runs batted in (RBIs) with the Tampa Yankees. During this campaign he was third in the Florida State League in batting average and led the league in stolen bases with 30. Gardner was also second in the league in walks with 47.

In 2007, he played 54 games for the Double-A Trenton Thunder, though he missed time with a broken bone in his hand. In 203 at bats, he stole 18 bases (tied for fifth in the league; while being caught four times), hit five triples, and batted .300 with a .392 on-base percentage (OBP), before being promoted to the Triple-A Scranton/Wilkes-Barre Yankees. There, in 45 games, he batted .260 with a .343 OBP, and stole 21 bases while being caught only three times.

In fall 2007, he played in 26 games in the Arizona Fall League, leading it in runs (27) and stolen bases (16), while being caught stealing only once. He batted .343 (fifth in the league) with a .433 OBP (third) and was third in the league in walks with 17. In 2007, he was the 12th-best prospect in the Yankees minor league system according to Baseball America.

Playing for Scranton/Wilkes-Barre in 2008, in 94 games Gardner was second in the International League with a .414 on-base percentage, 70 walks, 11 triples, and was sixth in the IL with 37 stolen bases, while being caught only nine times.

Through 2008 in the minor leagues, he had a .291 batting average and a .389 OBP. He had stolen 153 bases, being caught only 31 times (an 83% success rate).

=== New York Yankees ===
==== 2008 ====
On June 30, 2008, Gardner was called up and made his major league debut, batting last and going 0-for-3 and grounding into a triple play. On July 26, 2008, Gardner was optioned back to AAA after the acquisition of Xavier Nady in order to continue to receive playing time. The Yankees again recalled Gardner in 25 days.

On September 21, 2008, Gardner scored the final run of Major League Baseball in Yankee Stadium history as a pinch runner for Jason Giambi, scoring on a sacrifice fly by Robinson Canó in the seventh inning of an eventual 7–3 win for the Yankees over the Baltimore Orioles. Gardner finished his rookie season playing in 42 games, batting .228 with 16 RBI and 13 stolen bases.

==== 2009: World Series championship ====
Gardner was named the Yankees' starting center fielder for Opening Day of the 2009 season on March 29, beating out Melky Cabrera for the position, although Cabrera would eventually replace Gardner as the starting center fielder. Gardner played 108 games during the 2009 season, batting .270 with three home runs, 23 RBI, and 26 stolen bases. Gardner was also part of the Yankees' postseason run, appearing in all but one of the Yankees postseason games and starting the final two games of the World Series, as the team won the Series for the first time since 2000 by beating the Philadelphia Phillies.

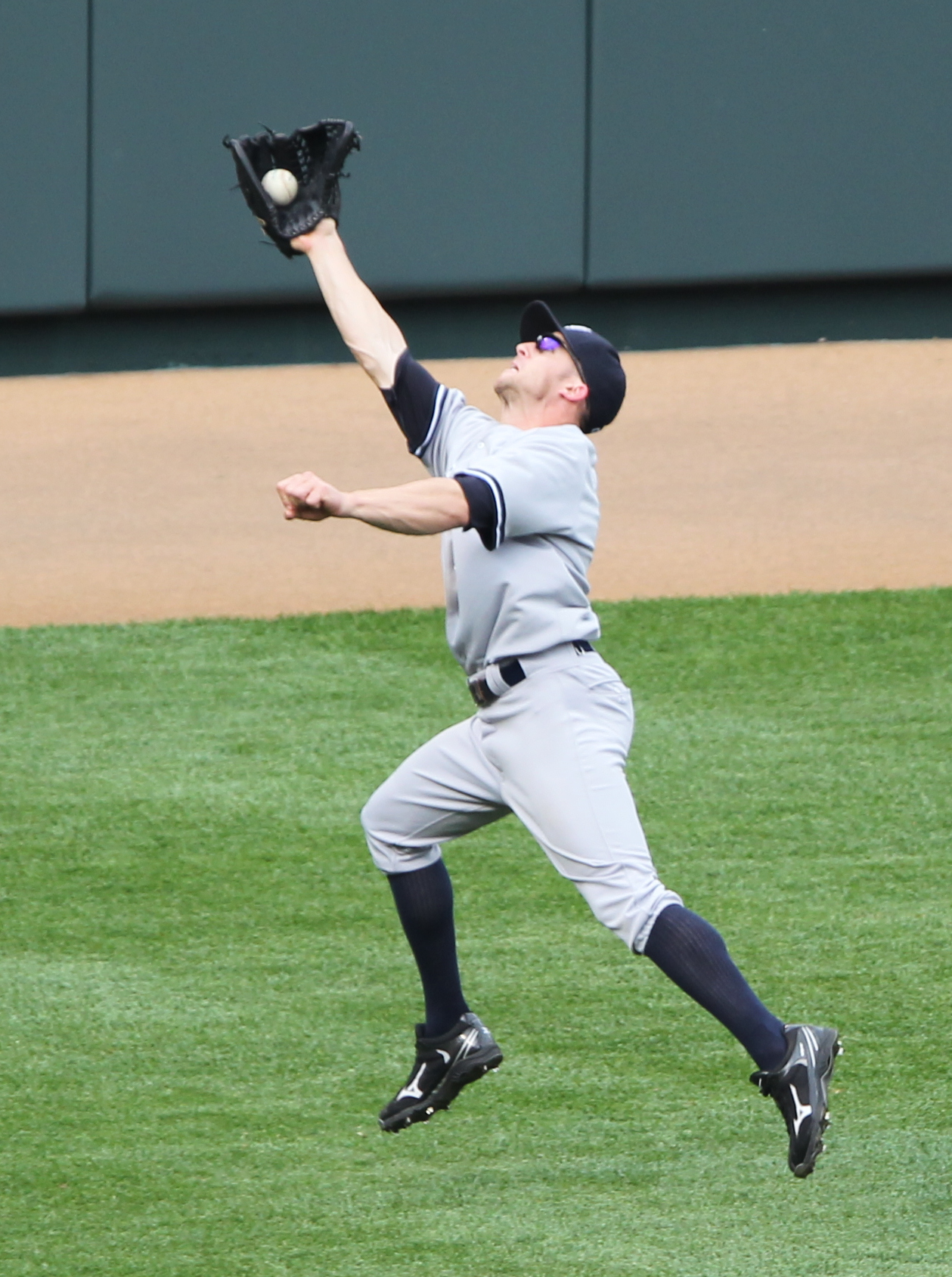
Gardner catching a fly ball in the outfield

==== 2010 ====
Gardner began the 2010 season as the Yankees' starting left fielder, taking over after Johnny Damon left in free agency, he finished the season with a .277 batting average and 47 stolen bases in 150 games, and had the highest number of pitches per plate appearance in the major leagues (4.61). He also won the 2010 Fielding Bible Award as the best defensive left fielder in MLB.

On December 7, 2010, Gardner underwent surgery to get rid of inflamed tissue in his wrist, with Yankees general manager Brian Cashman stating that he would be back in time for spring training.

==== 2011 ====
Gardner started the 2011 season hitting leadoff for the Yankees. He struggled in that role and was demoted to the bottom third of the order. However, after Jeter was put on the disabled list for a calf injury, Gardner was returned to the top of the order, alternating with Nick Swisher. After Jeter's return and Alex Rodriguez's stint on the disabled list for knee surgery, Gardner and Jeter periodically shared the top of the order, with Gardner at lead-off and Jeter batting second.

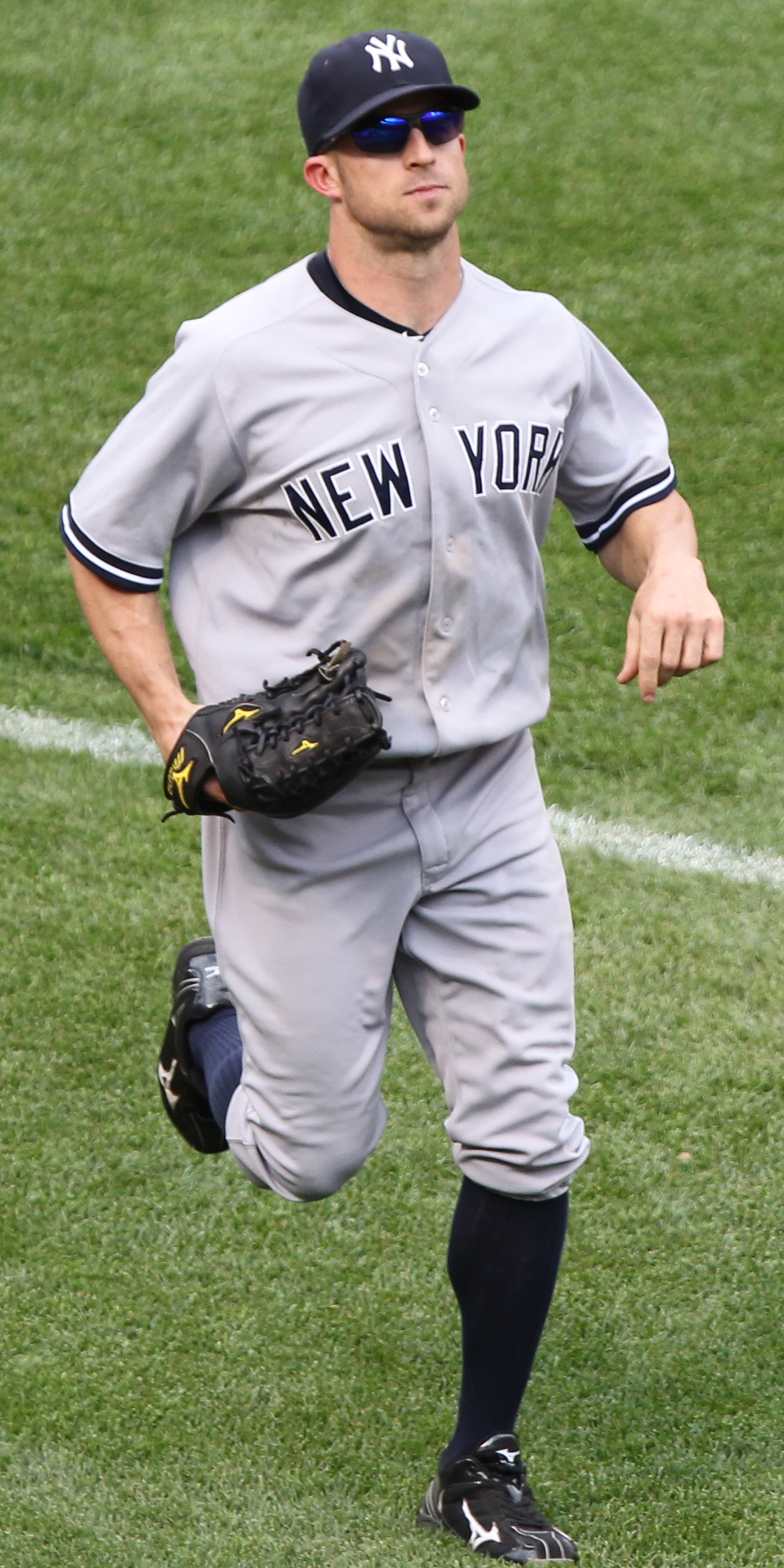
Brett Gardner with the Yankees in 2011

Gardner finished the 2011 season tied for first in the American League in stolen bases with Coco Crisp, each having 49. Gardner won his second consecutive Fielding Bible Award as the best fielding left fielder in the MLB. Gardner played in 159 games, batting .259 with seven home runs and 36 RBI.

==== 2012 ====
Gardner and the Yankees agreed on a $2.8 million contract for the 2012 season, avoiding arbitration. Gardner experienced an elbow injury in 2012 and was expected to return in August. On July 16, Gardner suffered a setback and his chances of missing the entire season increased. On July 24, Gardner underwent right elbow surgery, performed by Christopher S. Ahmad, to remove a bone spur and inflamed tissue. He was reactivated on September 25 after Steve Pearce and Justin Thomas were designated for assignment. Gardner played in 16 games during 2012, batting .323 with two stolen bases and three RBI.

==== 2013 ====
With Curtis Granderson having suffered a fractured right forearm during a spring training game, Gardner was moved to center field for the 2013 season. For the week of June 2–9, Gardner was named the AL Player of the Week.

On August 11, 2013, Gardner hit his first career walk-off home run with two outs in the bottom of the ninth inning off of Detroit Tigers reliever José Veras. The home run sealed a 5–4 victory for the Yankees, and helped give support to a struggling Mariano Rivera, who blew three consecutive save opportunities for the only time in his career. In the same series against Detroit two days earlier, Gardner made his first bailout of Rivera's pitching mishap by hitting a walk-off single past a diving Miguel Cabrera to give the Yankees a 4–3 win. According to the Elias Sports Bureau, Gardner became the first Yankee since Claudell Washington in 1988 to have two walk-off hits in a span of three or fewer games. In 2013, Gardner played 145 games batting .273 with eight home runs, 33 doubles, an American League leading 10 triples, 52 RBI, and 24 stolen bases.

==== 2014 ====
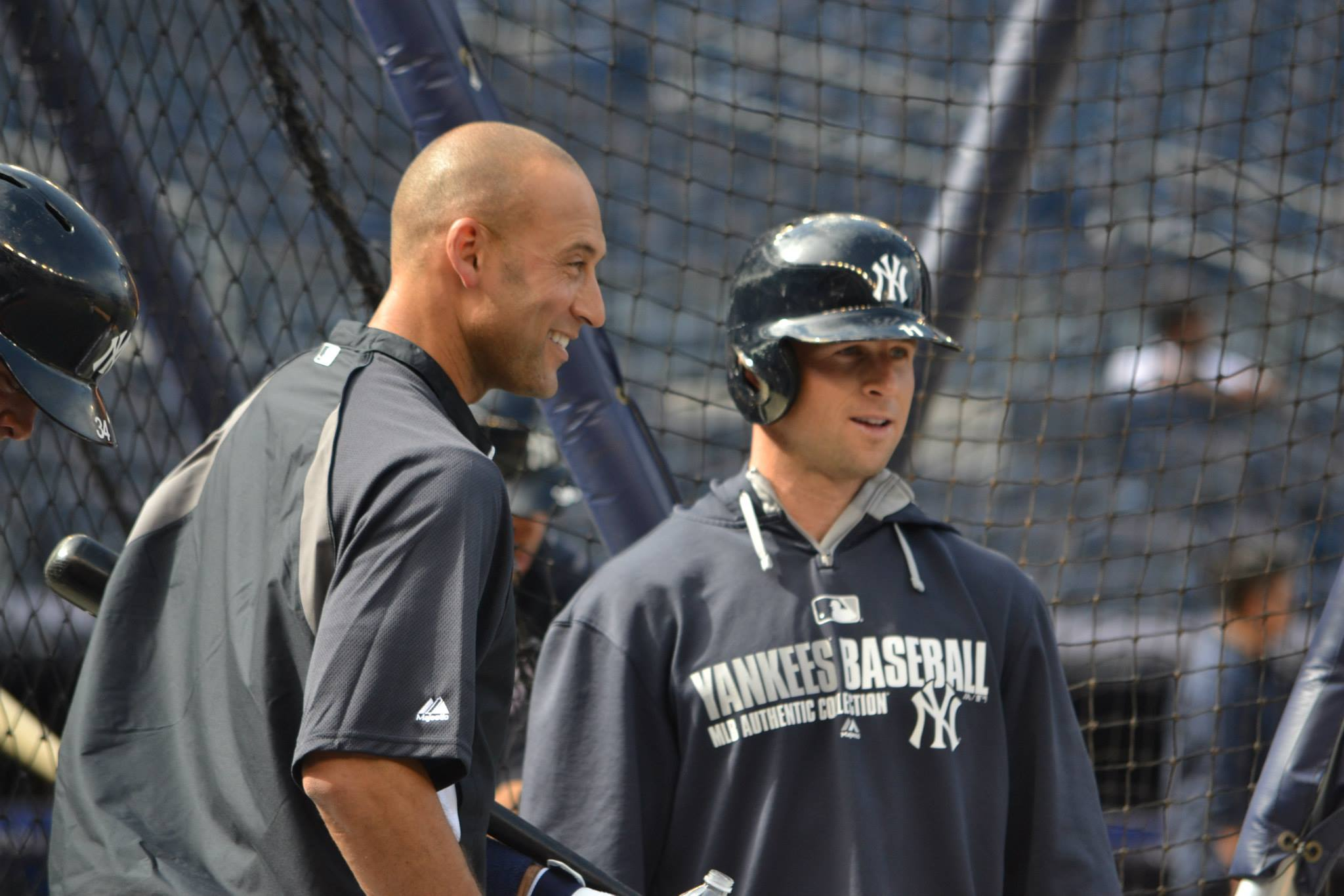
Derek Jeter (left) and Gardner during batting practice in 2014

On February 23, 2014, the Yankees and Gardner agreed to a four-year, $52 million extension to begin in 2015. On April 23, 2014, Gardner made his first career start at right field. On July 28, 2014, Gardner recorded his first career multi-homer game where he hit two home runs off of Texas Rangers pitcher Yu Darvish. He was named AL Player of the Week on August 4. On September 21, Gardner recorded the 15,000th home run of the Yankees franchise off the Blue Jays' Drew Hutchison. Gardner struggled in September due to an injury, finishing 12-for-72 (.167 batting average), dampening his strong 2014 offensive season. Gardner changed his approach to hitting, relying less on his declining speed and altering his swing to develop more power. For the 2014 season, Gardner played in 148 games, batting .256 with a career-high 17 home runs, 58 RBI, and 21 stolen bases, and had the highest number of pitches per plate appearance in the major leagues (4.44).

Gardner was the Yankees' nominee for the Hank Aaron Award for the 2014 season. After the 2014 season, Gardner underwent surgery in his right arm to correct a rectus abdominis muscle injury that affected him in July and September.

==== 2015: All-Star season ====
Gardner was named AL Player of the Week for the week ending June 28, 2015. He was one of the five candidates chosen for the All-Star Final Vote for the 2015 MLB All-Star Game, but was later removed from the ballot after being chosen to replace the injured Alex Gordon on the All-Star team. Gardner's hot first half would not last the whole season; after batting .302 up to the All-Star break, he struggled for the rest of the year, hitting .206 in the second half of the season. After going 0–4 with three strikeouts in the Yankees' 3–0 loss to the Houston Astros in the 2015 AL Wild Card Game, Gardner received a loud roar of boos from fans at Yankee Stadium.

In 2015, Gardner continued his hitting approach from the prior season, batting .259 with 16 home runs, 66 RBI, and 20 stolen bases.

==== 2016: Gold Glove season ====
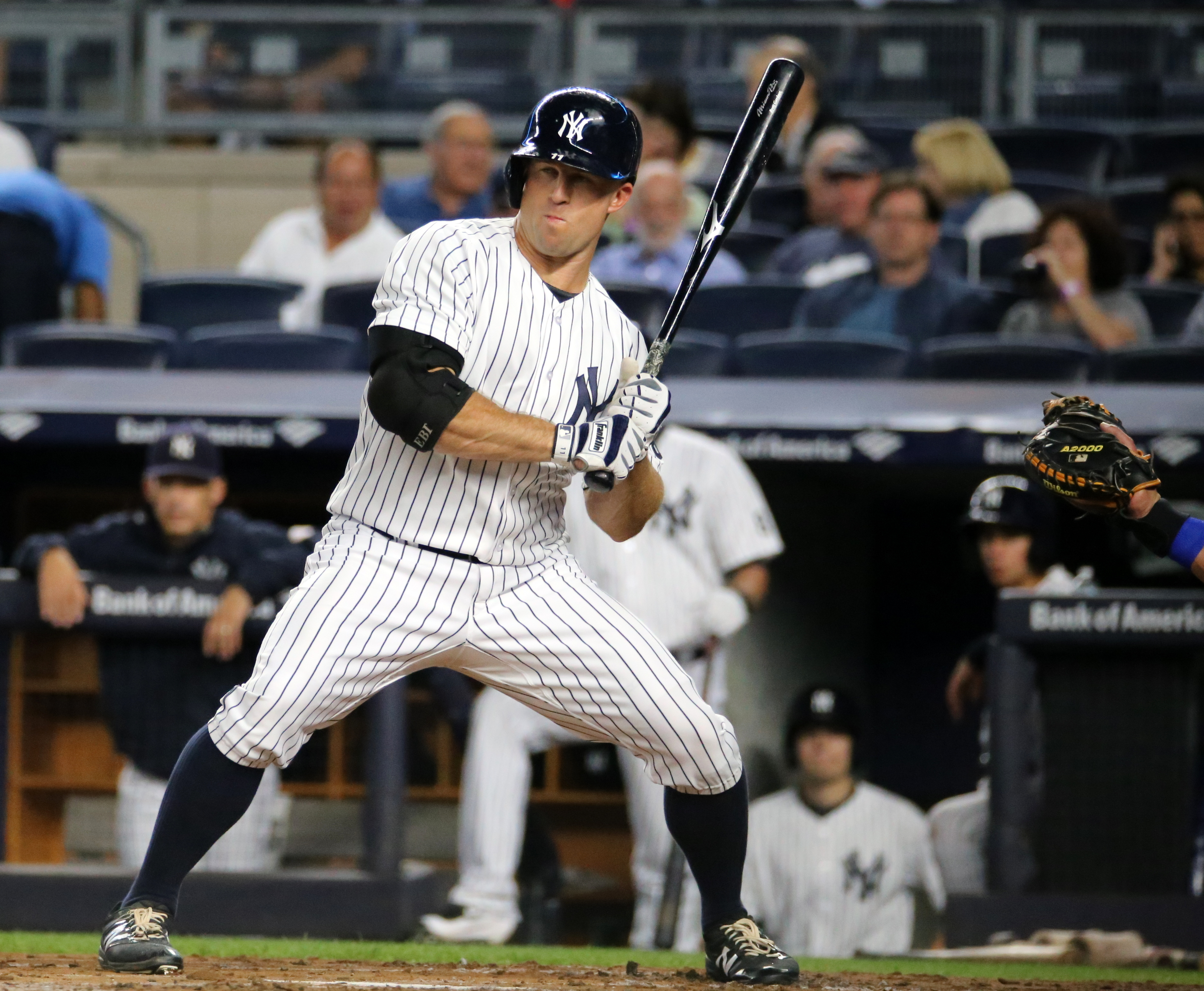
Gardner in September 2016

Gardner was moved into the Yankees' leadoff spot midseason after traditionally hitting behind Jacoby Ellsbury during Ellsbury's tenure as a Yankee. On April 23, Gardner hit a walk-off home run against the Tampa Bay Rays. Gardner's on-base percentage in 2016 was .351, his highest in a full season since 2010, and his 70 walks were his most since that same season. However, his .713 OPS was tied with 2011 for his lowest career mark in a full season. For the 2016 season, Gardner hit .261 with seven home runs, 41 RBI, and 16 stolen bases. His home run and RBI count were the lowest in a full season since 2011, while he recorded the lowest stolen base count of his career in a full season. He won the Gold Glove Award for American League left fielders.

==== 2017 ====
On April 12, 2017, Gardner collided with Rickie Weeks of the Tampa Bay Rays at first base, and both players left the game. Gardner did not sustain a serious injury and came away only with a bruised jaw and strained neck. The Yankees listed him as day-to-day. On April 29, Gardner hit two home runs in a 12–4 win over the Baltimore Orioles. On May 2, Gardner had another two home run game in an 11–5 win over the Toronto Blue Jays. On May 5, with the Yankees down to their final strike, Gardner hit a go-ahead three-run home run off of Hector Rondon, which proved to be the game winner as the Yankees won 3–2 over the Chicago Cubs. On June 1, Gardner collected the 1,000th hit of his career off Marco Estrada of the Toronto Blue Jays. On June 30, Gardner went 3-for-5 with a grand slam and 6 RBIs, tying his career high, while falling a triple short of the cycle. On July 27, Gardner hit his 18th home run of the season, a walk-off against the Tampa Bay Rays, setting a new career high for single-season home runs. The next day, Gardner started the game with a leadoff home run. Gardner hit a walk-off single on July 29 with the bases loaded in the bottom of the ninth. Gardner hit 21 home runs, recording 23 steals and a .264 average as the Yankees made the playoffs and finished one game shy of the World Series. Gardner had a productive postseason, batting .286 with 2 RBI in the American League Division Series versus the Cleveland Indians. He was listed as a Gold Glove finalist, but ultimately lost to Alex Gordon of the Kansas City Royals.

==== 2018 ====
Gardner entered the 2018 season as a member of a crowded outfield. However, due to injuries to Jacoby Ellsbury, (who missed the entire 2018 season with various ailments), Clint Frazier, who suffered a concussion in spring training that sidelined him for most of the season, and Aaron Judge (who missed two months with a wrist injury), Gardner saw more playing time than originally expected, appearing in 140 games. He finished the season batting .236 (his worst average since 2008), with 12 home runs and 45 RBI. On October 31, 2018, the Yankees announced they had declined his $12.5 million option for 2019, and instead re-signed him to a one-year, $7.5 million contract for the 2019 season.

==== 2019 ====
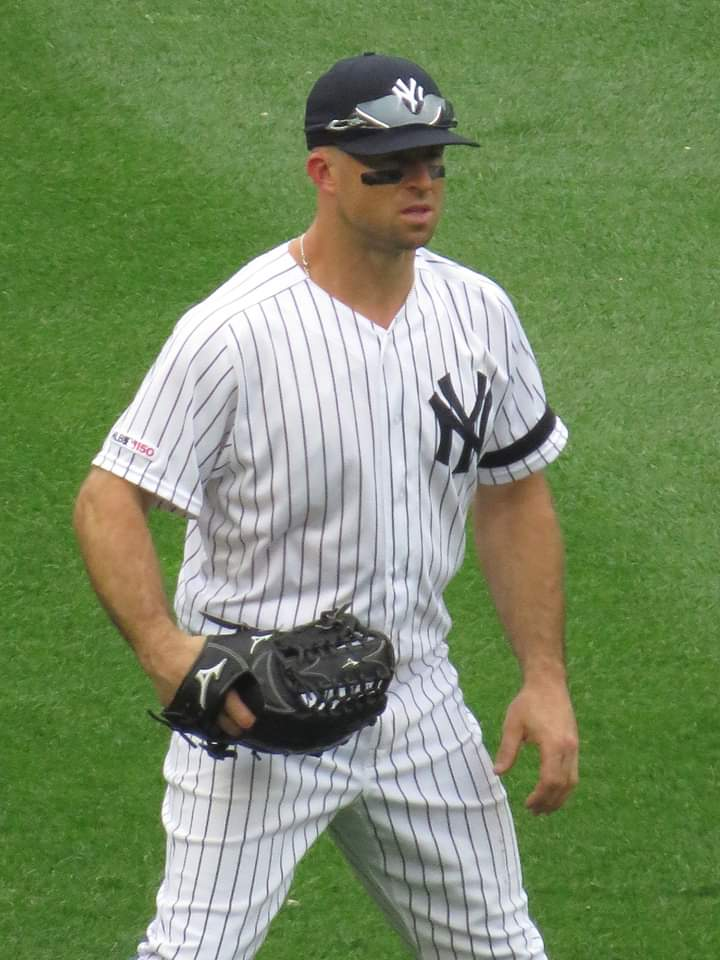
Gardner in 2019

On April 17, 2019, Gardner hit his 100th career home run—a grand slam off Ryan Brasier—to give the Yankees a go-ahead 5–3 lead over the Boston Red Sox in what would be the game-deciding hit. He became one of two players in Yankees history (alongside Derek Jeter) to hit at least 100 home runs and steal at least 250 bases. On July 26, the Yankees placed Gardner on the 10-day injured list (retroactive to July 22) for left knee inflammation stemming from an injury he had suffered the previous week, putting him on the injured list for only the third time in his major league career. He was recalled from the injured list on August 2.

Gardner hit .251 with a career-high 28 home runs and 74 RBIs in 2019. He finished third in Gold Glove voting

After the 2019 season, Gardner became a free agent. The Yankees re-signed Gardner to a one-year contract with an option for the 2021 season.

==== 2020 ====
In the shortened 2020 season, Gardner, again in a fourth-outfielder role, played in 49 games, hitting .223 with five home runs and 15 RBI. On October 29, 2020, the Yankees declined their 2021 $10 million option on Gardner, making him a free agent.

==== 2021 ====
On February 23, 2021, Gardner signed a one-year, $4 million contract with the Yankees, which included an option for 2022. Despite once again starting the season as a projected fourth outfielder, due to injuries to Aaron Hicks, Gardner played in 140 games and hit .222 with 10 home runs and 39 RBI. On November 4, the option for 2022 was not exercised, making Gardner a free agent. He was the final member of the 2009 World Series team remaining on the team.

=== Free agency ===
Gardner was not signed by any team prior to the start of the 2022 season. In October 2022 a New Jersey paper reported that he had received a $6M offer from the Toronto Blue Jays but preferred to have returned to the Yankees.

== Player profile ==
Gardner's main strength was his speed. He was best known for stealing bases and being very disciplined at the plate. In 2010 and 2014, Gardner saw more pitches per at-bat than any other player in the American League.

== Awards and honors ==
MLB

- World Series champion (2009)
- MLB All-Star (2015)
- AL Gold Glove Award (2016)
- Wilson Defensive Player of the Year at left field (2016)
- Heart & Hustle Award (2017)
- 2× Fielding Bible Award (2010, 2011)
- AL stolen base leader (2011)
- AL triples leader (2013)
- 3× American League (AL) Player of the Week (June 9th, 2013, August 3rd, 2014, June 28th, 2015)

== Personal life ==
Gardner and his wife, Jessica, have two sons: Hunter and Miller. Miller was born in October of 2010, in Charleston, South Carolina, and died from exposure to carbon monoxide on March 21, 2025, at the age of 14, during a family vacation in Costa Rica. Gardner's family filed a wrongful death lawsuit against the owners and operators of the resort where the death occurred. The New York Yankees honored Miller with a moment of silence before their Opening Day game on March 27, 2025.

In the offseason, the Gardners reside in Holly Hill, South Carolina.

His father, Jerry Gardner, who played in the minors for the Phillies, owns a 2,600-acre (1,100 ha) farm in Holly Hill. Brett was raised on the farm by Jerry and his mother, Faye, with his older brother, Glen.

== See also ==
- List of Major League Baseball players who spent their entire career with one franchise
- List of College of Charleston people
- List of Major League Baseball annual triples leaders
- List of Major League Baseball career games played as a left fielder leaders
- List of Major League Baseball career putouts as a left fielder leaders
- New York Yankees award winners and league leaders
