= Charleston School of Law =

Private law school in Charleston, South Carolina, US

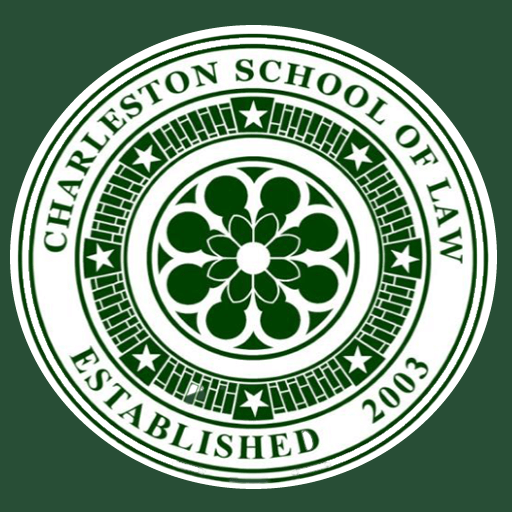
- Charleston School of Law
- Motto: "Serving the Greater Good"
- Parent school: none
- Established: May 12, 2003
- School type: Private law school
- Dean: Jonathan A. Marcantel
- Location: Charleston, South Carolina, United States; 32°47′26″N 79°56′18″W
- Enrollment: 619
- Faculty: 55
- Bar pass rate: 77% (July 2022); 49.2% (February 2022)
- Website: charlestonlaw.edu
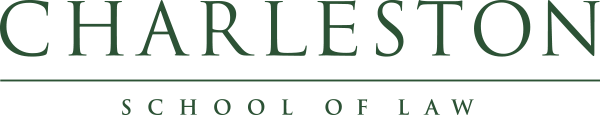

The Charleston School of Law (CSOL) is a private law school in Charleston, South Carolina. It was established in 2003 and is accredited by the American Bar Association (ABA). The school was founded upon a principle of promoting public service by its students and graduates; each student must perform at least 50 hours of public service before graduation. According to the school's 2021 ABA-required disclosures, 85% of the Class of 2017 obtained full-time, long-term, JD-required employment nine months after graduation. The school was formerly a for-profit institution, but became a non-profit institution in December 2024.

== History ==
=== Inspiration and establishment ===
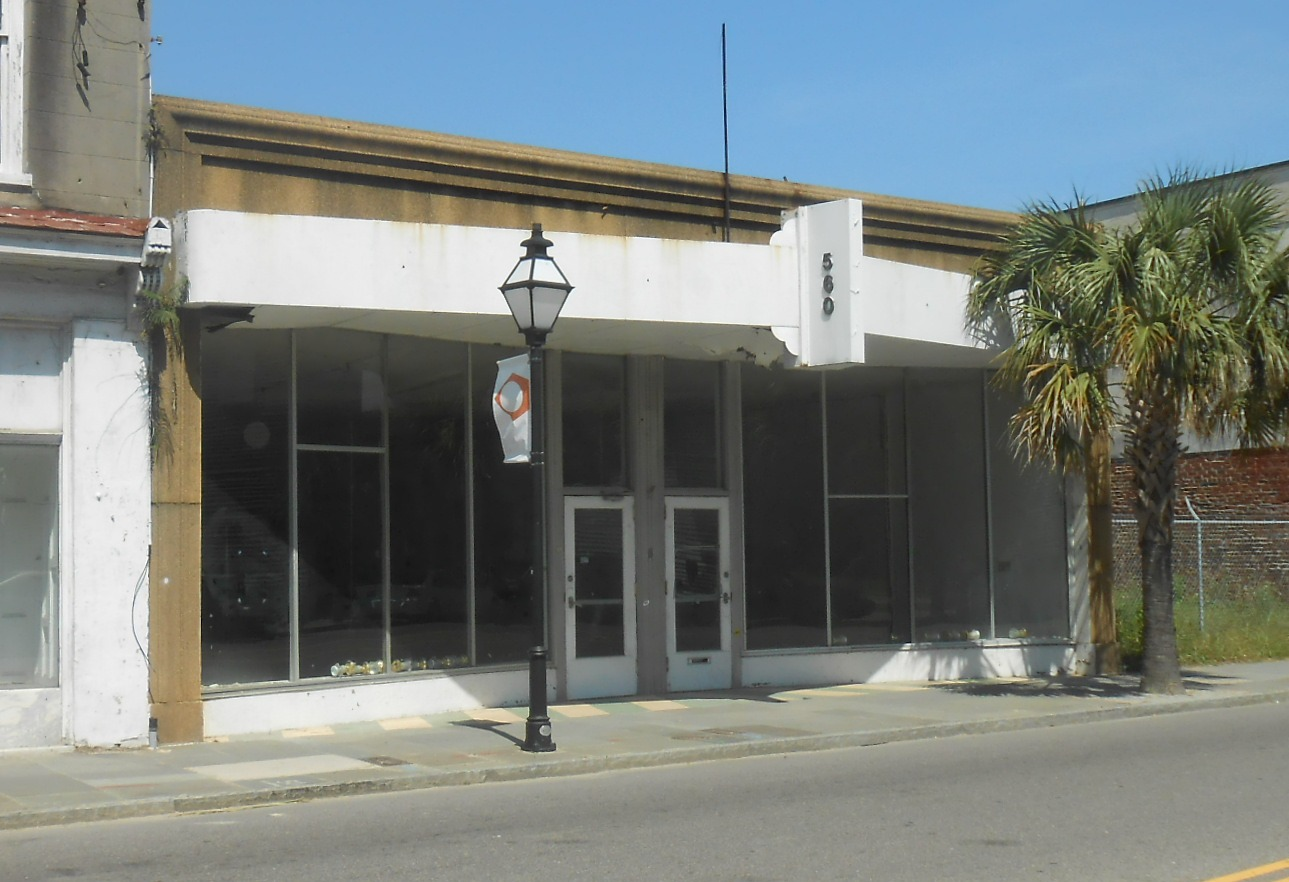
The first location of the Charleston School of Law in 2003 was at 560 King St.

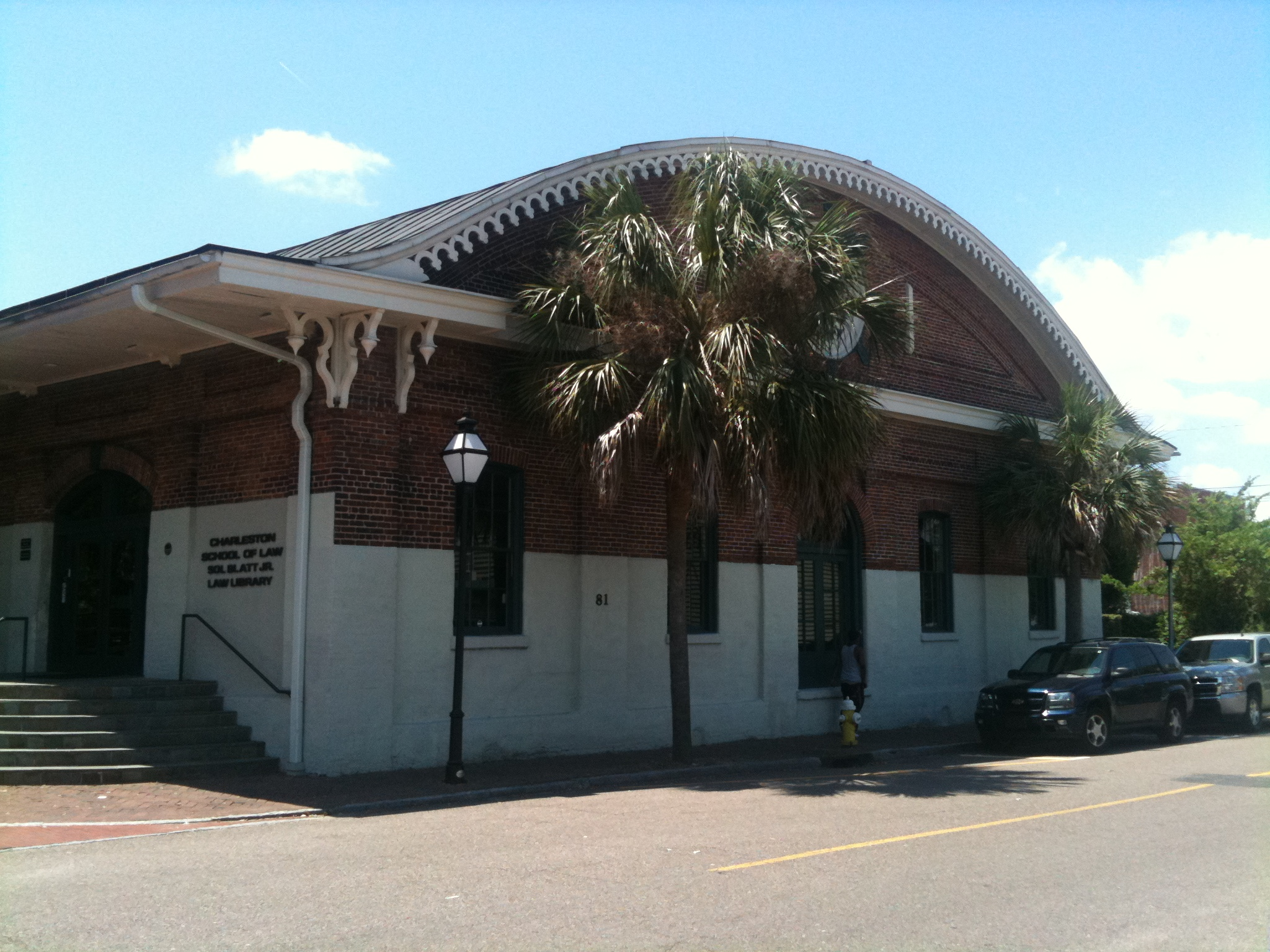
The current location of the Charleston School of law, at 81 Mary Street.

In 2002, five Charleston judges and attorneys started establishing a law school in Charleston, the first organized effort to offer instruction in the law in Charleston since the 1828 dissolution of the Forensic Club. The five founders were Alex Sanders (a former president of the College of Charleston and a former Chief Judge of the South Carolina Court of Appeals), Edward J. Westbrook (a notable civil lawyer in Charleston), Robert Carr (a U.S. magistrate judge), George Kosko (a U.S. magistrate judge until 2008), and Ralph McCullough (a professor emeritus and former associate dean at the University of South Carolina Law School). The South Carolina Commission on Higher Education granted a license for the school to start accepting students in Fall 2004.

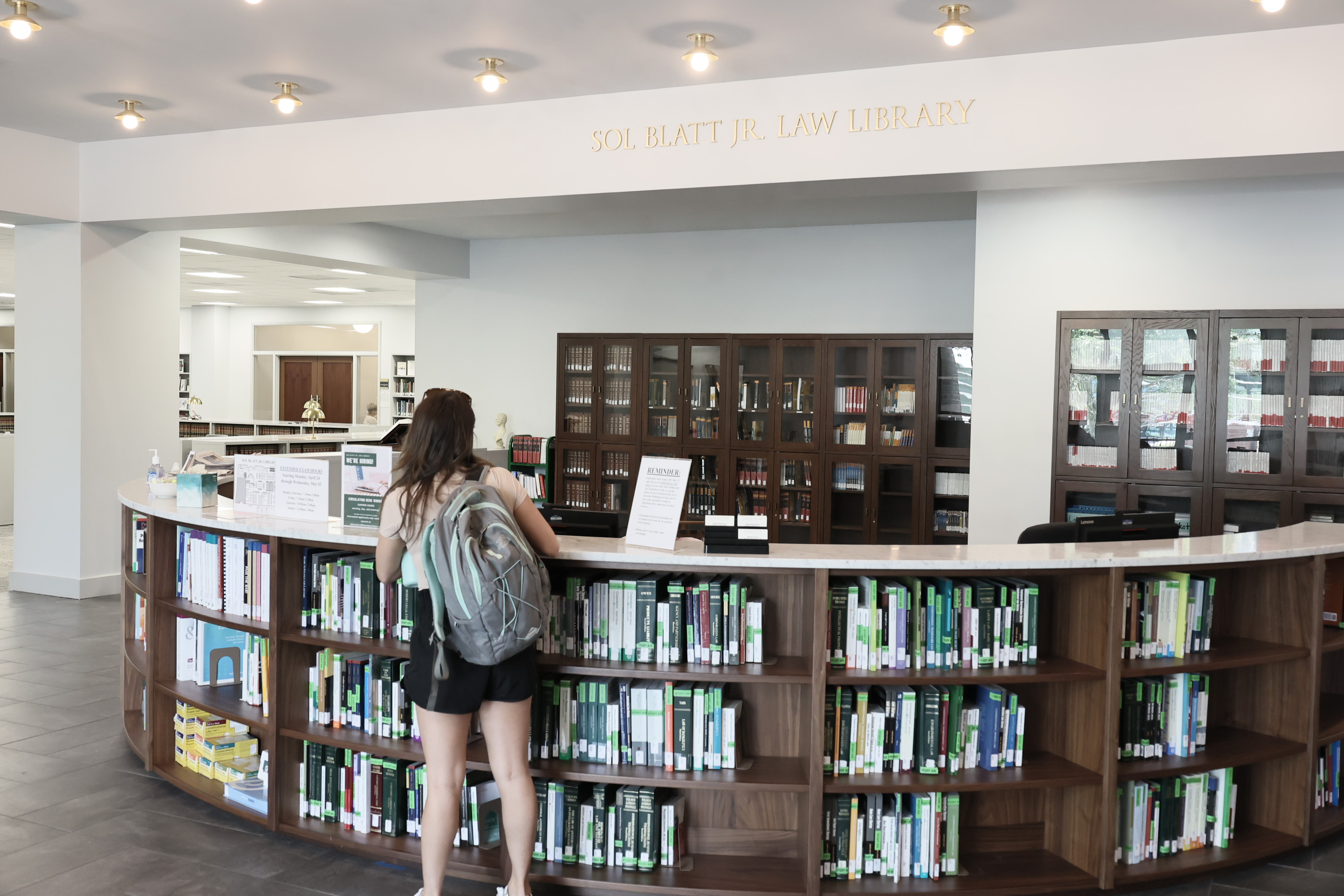
The Solomon Blatt Jr. Law Library.

=== ABA accreditation ===
In October 2005, the American Bar Association (ABA) sent an accreditation team to review the progress of the law school. In April 2006, the ABA's Accreditation Committee recommended provisional accreditation, but its final authority (the ABA's Council of the Section of Legal Education and Admissions to the Bar) deferred a vote on the recommendation until December 2006. The school was asked to address questions about the institution's governance, library resources, and commitment to diversity.

The deferral caused concern for the school: In South Carolina, only graduates of ABA-accredited law schools may sit for the bar exam. Although students graduating from a provisionally accredited law school enjoy the full rights guaranteed to those graduating from fully accredited schools, including the right to sit for the bar exam, the delay until December 2006 was a problem since the deadline for registering for the bar exam was January 2007.

On December 2, 2006, the ABA granted provisional accreditation. Full accreditation cannot be granted until a school has been in operation for five years. On August 5, 2011, the ABA granted the school full accreditation.

On May 15, 2020, the council of the American Bar Association's Section of Legal Education and Admissions to the Bar met remotely and determined this school and nine others had significant noncompliance with Standard 316. This Standard was revised in 2019 to provide that at least 75% of an accredited law school's graduates who took a bar exam must pass one within two years of graduation. The school was asked to submit a report by Feb. 1, 2021; and, if the council did not find the report demonstrated compliance, the school would be asked to appear before the council at its May, 2021 meeting. On February 26, 2021, the ABA's council posted that the school was now in compliance with the standard.

=== School's first graduation ===
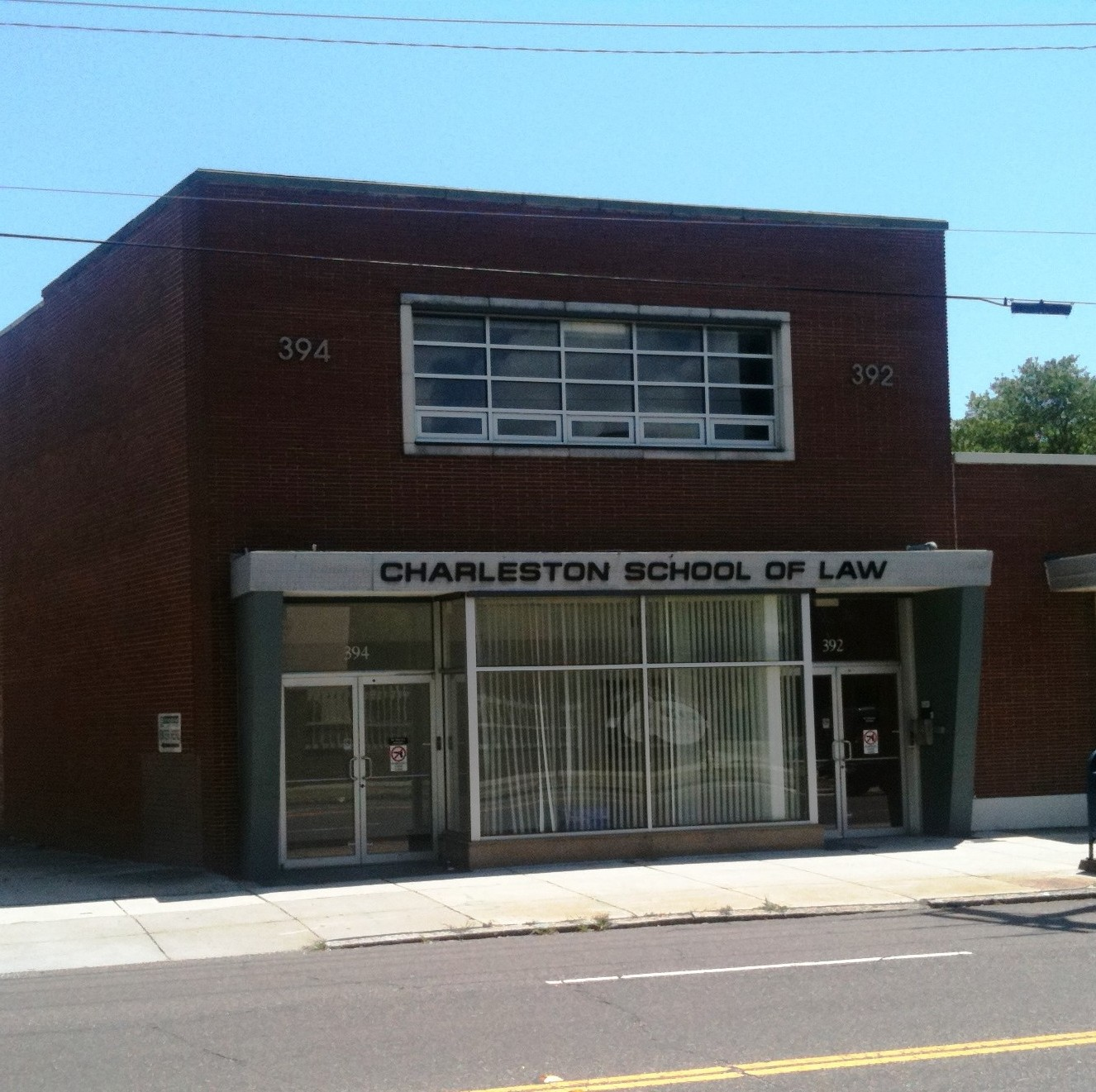
Before completing the converstion of 385 Meeting St. to school facilities, the school rented nearby buildings such as 394 Meeting Street.

On May 19, 2007, the school's first class of 186 students graduated at a ceremony held at The Citadel, The Military College of South Carolina, located in Charleston. Former U.S. Senator Ernest "Fritz" Hollings delivered the main address. Jean H. Toal, Chief Justice of the South Carolina Supreme Court, and William Walter Wilkins, Chief Judge of the U.S. Court of Appeals for the Fourth Circuit received LL.D. honorary degrees.

With the blessing of the descendants of the organizers of the original Forensic Club, the school organized an honorary society also known as the Forensic Club. In its current form, up to five students are inducted into the group each year from the graduating class based on the recommendation of the faculty and approval by the founders.

=== Change of ownership ===
On July 25, 2013, the school announced that it had entered a consulting/management contract with a subsidiary of InfiLaw, a Delaware Corporation with headquarters in Naples, Florida, which owns three other law schools. Two of the school's founders, Sanders and McCullough, were paid by InfiLaw and left the board when the arrangement with InfiLaw was announced. This announcement was seen as a prelude to a sale of the school and was immediately opposed by students. Formal announcement of a sale was made on August 28, 2013, but documents submitted to the South Carolina Commission on Higher Education (CHE) revealed that an agreement had been executed between the law school and InfiLaw on July 23, 2013. The students and alumni of the law school were opposed to the sale for reasons including the perceived poor reputation of InfiLaw schools. In the weeks after the announcement of the possible takeover, 41 students transferred, a 64% increase from previous years. Still first year student enrollment in the fall of 2013 exceeded the enrollment for 2012. below.

On September 27, 2013, one of the three remaining founders, Westbrook, wrote to the other two remaining founders with proposals for avoiding the sale to InfiLaw: a cooling off period, the redemption of the interests of Kosko and Carr by the law school, and the exploration of a merger with the College of Charleston. Westbook stated that he would donate his own one-third interest to the College of Charleston if the third option were accepted. On October 2, 2013, Carr and Kosko rejected the offer made by Westbrook, claiming that no offers had been submitted; instead, they announced that they were proceeding with pursuing a sale to InfiLaw.

On October 3, 2013, the CHE agreed to waive a condition of the law school's license to permit the exploration of a possible merger between the law school and the College of Charleston or other public school; the waiver of that prohibition was granted for 90 days. On October 14, 2013, InfiLaw said it was willing to consider discussions with either the College of Charleston or the University of South Carolina about the future ownership of the school. Representatives of the College of Charleston and InfiLaw met in late October 2013, but no information about the meeting, including its attendees and agenda, has been released. In a survey completed almost exclusively by current students and released in early November 2013, only 0.55% of respondents supported the sale of the school to Infilaw.

The CHE assembled a team to investigate the possible transfer and accepted statements about the transfer through February 10, 2014. Charleston mayor Joseph P. Riley Jr. on December 16, 2013, opposed the InfiLaw deal. Among his reasons was a real estate agreement from 2004; the city had purchased property on Woolfe St. for $1.2 million and sold it to the new law school for $875,000 to help it establish itself. He explained, "Certainly the city of Charleston would not have done this with any thought that eventually the Charleston School of Law would become part of a national, for-profit system of law school." Among those opposing the deal were tenured professors Jerry Finkel and Randall Bridwell who wrote about concerns about bar passage rates and class sizes.

The CHE's Academic Affairs and Licensing Committee scheduled its meeting to vote on the InfiLaw proposal on May 1, 2014, at 9:00 a.m. The full CHE announced that it would take up the committee's vote immediately afterward at 10:30 a.m. Instead of taking up the issue, a panel of the CHE announced on May 1, 2014, that it would hold two more public meetings before considering the matter on May 19, 2014; the full CHE would then hear the panel's recommendation at a meeting on June 5, 2014. On May 13, 2014, a supermajority of the school's faculty publicly released two letters opposing the InfiLaw deal.

The first public hearing on the takeover was held in Charleston on May 16, 2014. Representatives of Inifilaw were "greatly outnumbered" by those opposing the license, including faculty, alumni, and students. Riley also opposed the license. One of the founders, Westbrook, offered to continue his funding of the school in the event of a denial of Infilaw's license. A second public hearing was held on May 19, 2014, in Columbia, South Carolina. Speakers expressed concerns about InfiLaw's practice of accepting students who incur large debt but do not graduate and bar a bar exam. During the second hearing, Infilaw's lawyer revealed that the founders of the school had taken $25 million in profits between 2010 and 2014 and that InfiLaw had paid $6 million more to some of the founders. Founder Carr said, ". . . I never thought it was going to be a big business deal. I was wrong." Westbrook later revealed that Carr and Kosko had not only been draining profits from the business for several years over his objections, but had also depleted the finances of the school by signing an expensive consulting contract with InfiLaw and by hiring a marketing firm to manage the public relations crisis.

The CHE's Committee on Academic Affairs and Licensing voted 3–1 to reject the license to buy the school at its meeting on May 19, 2014. The vote was set to be taken up by the full CHE at its meeting on June 5, 2014.

On May 27, 2014, a lawyer representing InfiLaw stated that InfiLaw would seek to have the $6,000,000 used to buy out the interests of McCullough and Sanders repaid immediately if negative publicity did not stop, explaining that the purchase agreement prohibited any of the founders from doing anything to interfere with the takeover, including speaking out at public hearings.

Shortly before the CHE was scheduled to meet, the South Carolina Attorney General's office issued an advisory opinion confirming that the CHE would need to follow the law and either deny or grant a license based on whether InfiLaw satisfied the requirements of the licensing law. On June 4, 2014, InfiLaw withdrew its application from the agenda of the CHE for its June 5, 2014 meeting. A state senator, John Courson, had apparently initiated the delay to give the CHE more time to consider the matter; opponents suggested that the delay was sought to avoid what InfiLaw saw as a likely defeat. In a prepared statement, InfiLaw stated that it would still pursue the license. Soon after the withdrawal of the application, opponents of the takeover, including representatives of both the current students and alumni, began calling for the creation of a non-profit to run the school instead. On June 14, 2014, he Charleston Post & Courier, published its editorial favoring that outcome.

By the start of the Fall 2014 term in August 2014, no new application for the transfer of the license had been filed with the CHE, but the school's dean said that he had been told to continue with the parallel process of obtaining American Bar Association approval. Meanwhile, a nonprofit was created as of August 7, 2014, in South Carolina known as the Charleston School of Law Eleemosynary. On September 18, 2014, Ed Westbook announced the make-up of the first board of directors for the non-profit; members included representatives of the local bar, the South Carolina judiciary, and law school administrators with national experience. On September 22, 2014, the Charleston Post & Courier's editorial board endorsed the non-profit for the school.

A delegation presented the case for the transfer to a committee of the ABA on October 30, 2014. Owners Carr and Kosko used their majority vote to send only Dean Abrams on behalf of the school and not to permit dissenting owner Westbrook a chance to speak. Following the meeting, the ABA said that the committee's decision would be taken up by the association's full Council of the Section of Legal Education and Admission to the Bar on December 6, 2014, decision.

On November 13, 2014, the three members of the school voted to hire Maryann Jones as the new president, replacing Dean Andy Abrams, who had been serving simultaneously as the dean and the president of the business since the retirement of McCullough. After eight days on the job, Jones gave notice that she would not continue in the position, citing the disharmony about the future of the school. She had begun immediately pressuring constituencies to support the sale of the school to InfiLaw (for whom she had been working before taking the job), but when Westbrook objected to her taking a position without first familiarizing herself with the positions of the interested parties, she resigned.

The ABA's Council of the Section of Legal Education and Admissions to the Bar on December 6, 2014, deferred action on InfiLaw's request for its takeover until the state regulators a had made their own decision. Infilaw began a campaign of lobbying members of the state legislature to influence the selection of CHE members.

On December 15, 2014, both Westbrook and InfiLaw's representative, Peter Gopelrud, addressed the Charleston County legislative delegation.a. Gopelrud admitted that InfiLaw had hired a member of the South Carolina House of Representatives, Jim Merrill, to assist it. (On December 14, 2016, Merrill was indicted for attempting "to influence a governmental decision" in exchange for $35,000 from Infilaw.) Following the presentations, the delegation adopted a resolution favoring Westbrook's non-profit model by a vote of 10-0 (with three members abstaining).

In mid- March 2015, the law school offered a buy-out of existing faculty members to reduce its operating costs. In March 2015, the school's first dean, Richard Gershon, wrote a blog post in which he charged that two of the three remaining founders favoring InfiLaw's takeover, Carr and Kosko, were motivated by greed; they had never contributed money to the operation of the school at its start and had any personal, financial responsibility for the school discharged after only two years.

On March 24, 2015, Westbrook gave notice that he was resigning as a director of the company owning the school, saying he would either donate his ownership interest to a charity or sell that interest and donate the proceeds to charity. He stated that he would be willing to sell his interest to the remaining owners of the LLC.

On May 6, 2015, the two remaining owners, Carr and Kosko, released a statement saying that the school might not accept new students for the 2015–2016 entering class, but conduct a "teach out," by continuing to educate those students already enrolled. Two other schools, likely InfiLaw schools in North Carolina and Florida, have been contacted about absorbing the current students. On May 6, 2015, Carr and Kosko held a meeting with the school's faculty and staff. Carr said that the burden of keeping the school afloat was on the shoulders of the faculty and staff. He implored the attendees to contact InfiLaw's representatives either individually or collectively to express support for InfiLaw and to plead for InfiLaw's return. Carr said that such support would have to be expressed to the students and to the public, including the Commission on Higher Education. He also announced that a decision about the school's future would be made the week of May 11.

Carr suggested that the lack of strong and public support for the sale to InfiLaw would mean that the law school would close. However, three days later, the CHE wrote to Carr and Kosko and reminded them that any teach-out plans and decision not to accept an entering class would require approval, but that nothing had been shared with the CHE to that point.

On May 15, 2015, approximately three-quarters of the school's faculty recorded their strong opposition to the InfiLaw sale in a commentary appearing in the local newspaper. On the same day, the remaining owners released a statement stating that no information about the future of the school would be released until the following week (that is, the week of May 18). On May 22, 2015, the school announced that it would accept an entering class for 2015–2016. It simultaneously announced that the school would not be renewing the contracts of seven of its faculty in a cost-cutting move.

On June 5, 2015, the board of the school announced the hiring of Joseph D. Harbaugh as the interim president. In addition to his educational background, Harbaugh serves on InfiLaw System's National Policy Board.

On June 26 and 29, 2015, Nancy Zisk and Allyson Haynes-Stuart, two of the seven professors whose contracts had not been renewed, filed suit against the law school's owners (including Carr, Kosko, and their limited liability company). The suits claim that the owners of the school falsely claimed a financial emergency existed but have continued draining money from the school's operation to avoid paying salaries and have violated tenure rights to retaliate for the plaintiffs' opposition to the sale of the school to InfiLaw. South Carolina trial judge Markley Dennis granted Zisk an injunction which required the school to rehire her pending the outcome of the lawsuits. On October 19, 2015, Carr, Kosko, and the law school counterclaimed against Zisk and Haynes, alleging that they had sabotaged the school and conspired with others to prevent its sale to Infilaw.

On August 14, 2015, the school announced that it would not be granting three professors tenure despite admitting their qualifications. explaining that it could not extend tenure during the alleged financial crisis. On October 16, 2015, two of the professors sued the school for several claims arising out of their denial of tenure and the financial mismanagement by the school's owners.

On October 28, 2015, the dean of the school announced that Ed Bell, a lawyer from Georgetown, South Carolina, would assume the presidency as of Thursday, October 29, 2015. Bell explained that he had agreed to personally fund the pay-off of the approximately $6 million debt the school had incurred to InfiLaw. He stated that his immediate plans included creating a board of directors, converting the school to a nonprofit, and securing a new campus. Bell paid off the loan for debt to InfiLaw 2017 and has updated facilities to meet standards set by the American Bar Association. Bell reports that he earns a salary of $1 and has not taken any money out of the college since he began in 2015.

In March 2016, the law school announced that the seven faculty members fired in 2015 would be returning in various capacities in the fall of 2016.

After being placed on the U.S. Department of Education's list of schools with a problematic Financial Ratio Responsibility score, the school's score rose from a failing minus 0.6 in 2014 and 2015 to 2.6 for 2016. A 1.5 is the point at which a school is placed on the watch list.

In June 2018, the school reported it was debt free.

In October 2023, asked the ABA to approve its conversion to a nonprofit. If the ABA signs off, the school said it would seek similar approvals from both the U.S. Department of Education and the South Carolina Commission on Higher Education. This request was approved in April 2024. Charleston Law has stated it will submit a licensing application to the South Carolina Commission on Higher Education, the state's licensing body. Additionally, Charleston Law will initiate the procedure to obtain approval from the U.S. Department of Education.

On December 1, 2024, the Charleston School of Law transitioned from a for-profit to a 501(c)(3) non-profit status. This structural change, led by President Emeritus J. Edward Bell III, aligns with the school’s celebration of its 20th anniversary. Approval from the American Bar Association and the South Carolina Commission on Higher Education was obtained prior to the transition. Hal Cobb was appointed as the Interim President.

== Costs, post-graduation information and student debt ==
=== Costs ===
The total per semester tuition cost of attendance at Charleston for the 2023–2024 academic year is $45,100.00. Law School Transparency's estimated debt-financed cost of attendance for three years is $213,710.

=== Employment ===
According to the school's 2018 ABA-required disclosures, 44.5% of the Class of 2017 obtained full-time, long-term, JD-required employment nine months after graduation. Its Transparency under-employment score is 40%, indicating the percentage of the Class of 2017 unemployed, pursuing an additional degree, or working in a non-professional, short-term, or part-time job nine months after graduation.

=== Average debt ===
According to U.S. News & World Report, the average debt for law school of 2013 graduates who incurred law school debt was $146,765, and 89% of 2013 graduates took on debt.

== Admissions ==
The following tables reflect admissions information arranged by the year of admission, not by year of graduation. Starting with the class enrolling in Fall 2017, the law school reported all students together and did not separately report full-time and part-time students.

Full-time	2004	2005	2006	2007	2008	2009	2010	2011	2012	2013	2014	2015	2016
Applications	N/A	952	835	912	1479	2050	2200	1784	1649	1392	1130	1039	1100
Accepted	N/A	32%	38%	35%	34%	38%	39%	51%	N/A	N/A	N/A	79.8%	N/A
Enrolled	N/A	138	137	130	134	190	188	173	147	157	145	79	184
75% LSAT/GPA	N/A	151/3.48	152/3.41	153/3.51	156/3.54	156/3.43	156/3.46	155/3.42	155/3.43	154/3.41	152/3.31	149/3.21	149/3.32
Median LSAT/GPA	N/A	150/3.08	151/3.16	152/3.20	154/3.27	154/3.20	155/3.25	153/3.20	152/3.21	150/3.17	148/3.03	146/2.89	144/3.02
25% LSAT/GPA	N/A	150/2.79	152/2.81	153.2.96	151/3.96	151/2.95	152/2.95	150/2.91	149/2.97	147/2.89	144/2.63	143/2.59	142/2.70

Part-time	2004	2005	2006	2007	2008	2009	2010	2011	2012	2013	2014	2015	2016
Applications	N/A	N/A	250	250	289	350	375	270	389	259	182	126	125
Accepted	N/A	N/A	33%	44%	41%	31%	29%	40%	N/A	N/A	N/A	19.8%	N/A
Enrolled	N/A	N/A	62	66	71	52	50	51	N/A	24	21	6	16
75% LSAT/GPA	N/A	N/A	N/A	153/3.43	152/3.36	152/3.30	153/3.37	151/3.30	152/3.50	150/3.12	151/3.37	N/A	153/3.13
Median LSAT/GPA	N/A	N/A	N/A	150/3.08	150/3.10	151/2.92	151/3.04	147/2.84	148/3.01	146/2.94	145/2.68	N/A	144/2.99
25% LSAT/GPA	N/A	N/A	N/A	148/2.81	147/2.77	147/2.51	149/2.80	146/2.50	146/2.59	143/2.71	143/2.41	N/A	141/2.74

Combined	2017	2018	2020	2021	2022	2023
Applications	1305	1373	1451	1515	1590	1747
Accepted	80.0%	NA	NA	NA	NA	56.6%
Enrolled	225	183	182		194	225
75% LSAT/GPA	148/3.29	150/3.45	153/3.43			154/3.65
Median LSAT/GPA	145/3.03	147/3.16	151/3.19			153/3.41
25% LSAT/GPA	142/2.69	145/2.81	148/2.82			149/3.12

== South Carolina bar-exam passage ==
In South Carolina, the bar exam is administered twice a year, in July and February. July is the primary testing date for those who graduate in May. A much smaller group, generally out-of-state applicants, repeat takers, and December graduates, take the February exam. The school graduated its first students in May 2007 who sat for the exam in July 2007.

	February	July
2007	---	69.9%^{*}
2008	47.9%	72.2%
2009	53.7%	75.9%
2010	60.0%	72.3%
2011	63.5%	75.0%
2012	40.3%	68.9%
2013	59.2%	72.6%
2014	47.8%	65.3%
2015	61.4%	57.4%
2016	45.9%	50.9%
2017	42.3%	43.5%
2018	32.8%	43.4%
2019	34.0%	51.1%
2020	48.4%	51.2%
2021	53.8%	46.3%
2022	49.2%	63.6%
2023	47.5%	65.1%
2024	48.2%	65.1%
2025	49.2%	75.2%
2026	78.6%	NA

^{*} The July 2007 results were revised upwards (from an original 65 percent rate) after the South Carolina Supreme Court threw out a section of the exam because of an error by a bar examiner.

== Student body ==
The median age of first-year, full-time students at the school is 23 years; however, students range from age twenty to fifty-one. About half of the full-time student body (56 percent) are South Carolina residents. Males outnumber females in the full-time program by a 52–48 margin.

== Other information ==
On November 29, 2007, the school's first dean, Richard Gershon, announced he would be leaving the post to return to full-time teaching at the school. He was awarded an honorary LL.D degree in May 2008.

In December 2007, Andrew L. Abrams, a professor at the school and a former provost for the College of Charleston, was named as the school's interim dean. In June 2008, Abrams became the school's second dean.

Former U.S. Senator and South Carolina Governor Ernest Hollings is on the Board of Advisors of the Charleston School of Law and is a Distinguished Visiting professor of Law there. He delivered the commencement address to the first graduating class there on May 19, 2007.

== Facilities ==
When the law school was first organized in 2003, the school was operated out of a building at 560 King Street while work progressed on its future location. Although the school left that building within one year, the school's physical plant has always been located in Charleston's Upper King Street district. During its first year in operation, the school was located at 81 Mary Street in an antebellum railroad station. That building continues to serve as the school's law library, while most classrooms, offices, and other uses have moved to new locations as the school has grown .

The school has leased space in nearby buildings including a large portion of the AT&T Building at the southwest corner of Mary and Meeting Streets and administrative space at 494 King Street. The school signed a letter of intent to buy the AT&T Building in 2006.

In 2004, the city agreed to buy a 1.25-acre lot at the corner of Woolfe Street and Meeting Street from the Army Corps of Engineers for $1,170,000; the Corps of Engineers had bought the parcel in $137,500 in 1977 and used it as storage. The city then was to sell the land to the law school at a loss for only $875,000 (with interest-only payments for nine years) in an effort to help the law school stay on the peninsula. In 2009, the deal was extended to allow the law school until July 1, 2017, to pay for the property. The deal was revised again on June 28, 2017; the law school would get 75% of the proceeds if it sold the land, and the city would get 25% (with a minimum return of $1,865,000). In 2017, a contract was pending for the sale of the land for $12.75 million. In February 2019, the city approved the site for the construction of a 252-room hotel despite public opposition to the plan to add yet another large hotel to the neighborhood.

In 2019, the city tried to renegotiate its 2017 agreement to give the city a bigger piece of the proceeds from the sale to a hotel. In March 2022, the city began asserting that none of the agreements with the law school since the initial sale were valid; the subsequent agreements were done by resolutions of city council instead of by ordinances. According to a court filing of March 25, 2022, the city regretted its decision to sell the land to the law school. By arguing that the subsequent agreements were all invalid, the City asserted that the original contract was still in place and that the law school lost title to the land when no school was built by the initial deadline.

In 2023, the Charleston School of Law opened its new library on the first floor of 385 Meeting Street, completing the law school's transition to relocate all its services, business operations and classrooms to a single location.

== Publications ==
=== Charleston Law Review ===
The Charleston Law Review is a journal published by second- and third-year students at the school. Its primary objective is to foster the knowledge and insight of students, practitioners, scholars and the judiciary through a traditional forum dedicated to the pursuit of innovative legal expression, composition and scholarship. Members of the organization contribute to this objective by editing articles, writing notes, and actively participating in all aspects of the publication process.

Its inaugural issue in Fall 2006, featured five articles by legal scholars on topics ranging from human trafficking to preservation of Gullah-Geechee culture.

The foreword of Volume 2, Issue 1 (Fall 2007) was written by U.S. President Barack Obama, who, at the time, was a U.S. Senator from Illinois and a leading candidate for the Democratic Party nomination in the 2008 U.S. presidential election. Retired Justice Sandra Day O'Connor was the keynote speaker at a symposium on First Amendment religious issues co-hosted by the Charleston Law Review on April 15, 2013.

=== Federal Courts Law Review (2005-2016) ===
Founded in July 1997, the Federal Courts Law Review is an electronic law review dedicated to legal scholarship relating to federal courts. Articles are from scholars, judges and distinguished practitioners. Its editorial board, composed primarily of U.S. magistrate judges and law-school professors, is designed to combine the insight of the federal judiciary with the perspective of law-school academics.

The school was selected in 2005 by the Federal Magistrate Judges Association to oversee the publication of a printed version of the Federal Courts Law Review. This companion to the current online format was intended to cater to subscribers who would welcome a printed version, as well as allow for inclusion of selected student works.

As of 2016, the Federal Courts Law Review was no longer affiliated with the Charleston School of Law and has been absorbed by the University of Mississippi School of Law.

=== Maritime Law Bulletin ===
The Maritime Law Bulletin (MALABU) is a periodical bulletin, edited by law students, focusing on significant maritime issues. First published in February 2006, the bulletin is the publishing arm of the school's Charleston Maritime Law Institute.

The institute is a collaborative effort involving students, professors and leading maritime lawyers and professionals from around the Southeastern U.S. In addition to promoting maritime legal studies at the school, the institute provides programs and seminars periodically on maritime matters.

=== Resolved: Journal of Alternative Dispute Resolution ===
Resolved is a student-run electronic publication that was founded in conjunction with the Center for Dispute Resolution. The center's vision in creating Resolved is to promote research and writing in the areas of dispute resolution theory, skills, techniques and application. Resolved provides a comprehensive resource that fosters intellectual discourse among the judiciary, professors, students, mediators and attorneys through a contemporary medium. Resolved is dedicated to increasing awareness of alternative dispute resolution trends and sharing thought-provoking viewpoints.

== Notable alumni ==
- Ashleigh Hale (2010)
- Russell Fry (2011), Republican, former member of the South Carolina House of Representatives and current representative to the House of Representatives from South Carolina's 7th congressional district following the 2022 elections.
- Nick Shalosky (2013), former member of the Charleston County School District and the first openly gay elected official in South Carolina.
