= Richard Gershon =

Ira Richard Gershon (1957 - 2024) is a former Dean of the University of Mississippi School of Law and current professor at the school. He came to the University of Mississippi after being the Founding Dean of the Charleston School of Law in Charleston, South Carolina.

As a law school administrator, Gershon is well known for properly moving schools through the American Bar Association (ABA) accreditation process. From the Charleston School of Law's founding in 2003 until his resignation in 2008, he was the Founding Dean of the Charleston School of Law. During his tenure there, the law school became provisionally accredited by the ABA in 2006. He was recruited by the law school to lead it through the accreditation process after being the dean of the Texas Wesleyan University School of Law in Fort Worth, Texas, which, under his leadership, received full accreditation from the ABA in 1999. Before his time at Charleston Law and Texas Wesleyan, Gershon was on the faculty of Stetson University College of Law from 1984 to 1998. While at Stetson, he was the Academic Associate Dean from 1988 to 1992.

In addition to his administrative duties, Gershon is a legal academic that emphasizes research in federal estate and gift taxation, federal partnership taxation, and estate planning issues.

Gershon attended the University of Georgia receiving the A.B. in political science in 1979. He later matriculated to the University of Tennessee College of Law, receiving the J.D. degree in 1982. Later, he studied tax law at the University of Florida, graduating with an LL.M. degree in 1983.

Gershon was married to Donna Levine, who is the Copy Chief of Garden & Gun Magazine. He had 4 children, Michelle, Benjamin, Claire, and Eve.
