= Millicent Brown =

American civil rights activist

- Born: 1948 (age 77–78); Charleston, South Carolina, United States
- Education: Bachelor of Arts in History, College of Charleston, 1975 Master of Education, The Citadel, 1978 Doctor of Philosophy in History, Florida State University, 1991
- Known for: Integrated Charleston public schools
- Notable work: Somebody Had to Do It
- Father: Joseph Arthur Brown

Millicent Ellison Brown is an American civil rights activist and educator best known for being one of the first people to racially integrate public schools in Charleston, South Carolina in 1963. She also founded the "Somebody Had to Do It" project.

== Early life ==
Millicent Brown was born in 1948 in Charleston, South Carolina. Her father was Joseph Arthur Brown, a real-estate broker and the NAACP president in Charleston and South Carolina. After the decision in Brown v. Board of Education in 1954, Brown's family, among other African American families, began the process of enrolling their children in public schools. After pushback, Brown's family filed a lawsuit in 1959 with Brown's sister as the lead plaintiff. The lawsuit was met with opposition from white people in South Carolina. In August 1963, the judge ruled that Black children could integrate into Charleston public schools but only permitted the plaintiffs to enroll that fall rather than all Black students.

=== High school ===
Brown, along with Jackie Ford, another African-American child, entered Rivers High School in 1963 as the first two Black children to attend the school. During their time at the school, Brown and Ford would have to endure racism and bullying from their white peers, causing emotional trauma. Despite this, Brown continued on to graduate.

== Career ==
After finishing high school, Brown went on to graduate from the College of Charleston with a B.A. in history in 1975, The Citadel with a M.Ed. in Education in 1978, and a PhD in U.S. History from Florida State University. She additionally taught at multiple schools. She wrote her dissertation while at Florida State University on the history of civil rights in Charleston from 1940 to 1970.

From 1995 to 1999, Brown worked as a professor at Bennett College. From 1999 to 2002, she worked at Guilford College. She then went on to work at the North Carolina Agricultural and Technical State University for a year until she later began teaching at the College of Charleston in 2002. She later went on to work at Claflin University in the History and Sociology department.

Brown serves on South Carolina's ACLU Board of Directors and as the state's representative to the national ACLU. She is a consultant for race relations and diversity issues and speaks at public schools with the College of Charleston's Avery Research Center.

=== Somebody Had to Do It Project ===
In 2006, Brown created the Somebody Had to Do It Project with the intent to share the story of other "first children" who integrated schools in the US, focusing on their physical and emotional experiences.

=== Awards ===
- Chester C. Travelstead Award for Courage in Education (2017)
- Commitment to Justice Award (2021)
