= Forensic Club =

American 19th century organization

The Forensic Club was a short-lived private organization chartered in 1826 to offer lectures in the law in Charleston, South Carolina.

On November 18, 1825, a group of Charleston's elite drafted a petition which was delivered to the statehouse and which requested a charter for a new organization to be known as the Forensic Club. Those petitioning the House of Representatives included at least the following named members: Richard Yeardon, Jr.; Charles S. Strohecker; George Buist; Henry Cochran; and Stephen Elliott. They claimed in their petition that they had "established a Lecture-ship on the Law, which has been accepted by a gentleman of known talents and legal eminence and that they contemplate also the future creation of a regular Law Institute in the City of Charleston and the annexation of a Law Library to their Institution for which purpose they are accumulating a fund." The group had formed as a social group in about June 1825, and in 1826 they sought a charter of incorporation to carry out that goal. The Statehouse granted the charter, and the first lecture was offered at City Hall on February 6, 1826, by Hugh Swinton Legare.

One scholar has suggested that the creation of the Forensic Club was one of the motivations for the creation of a public law school in South Carolina. The start of the Forensic Club was evidence that a mastery of the law was itself worthy, apart from its use as a means to professional licensure. Until that time, there were no law schools in South Carolina. But, Professor Merrill Christophersen has written that, soon after the Forensic Club lectures began, a resolution of the faculty of the South Carolina College (as the University of South Carolina was known at that time) "curiously" recommended the creation of a three- or four-year course in studying the law for college graduates.

The Forensic Club stopped offering lectures some time in 1827. In the fall of 1827, many of the same men who were the members of the Forensic Club met and decided to begin publishing a learned magazine on Southern perspectives on science, law, and literature. The men again chose Hugh Swinton Legare to edit the magazine, which would become the Southern Review (1828–1832). Legare therefore concluded his work with the Forensic Club and devoted himself to his new job.
