= Carol Hannah Whitfield =

American fashion designer

Carol Hannah Whitfield is an American fashion designer. In August 2009, she participated in the reality show Project Runway and received the third place prize. She is now focusing her work on bridesmaid gowns and wedding gown collections, and founded her eponymous label.
