= Christopher S. Ahmad =

American orthopedic surgeon

- Born: March 25, 1968 (age 58); Bay Shore, New York, United States
- Occupations: Orthopaedic surgeon, team physician
- Employers: New York Yankees; Columbia University College of Physicians and Surgeons
- Spouse: Beth Shubin Stein
- Website: elbowsportssurgeon.com, www.chrisahmadmd.com

Christopher S. Ahmad (born March 25, 1968) is the head team physician for the New York Yankees and a member of the Major League Baseball Team Physicians Association. He is a professor of clinical orthopaedic surgery at the Columbia University College of Physicians and Surgeons and an attending orthopaedic surgeon at the New York-Presbyterian/Columbia University Medical Center. In 2013, New York Yankee Alex Rodriguez filed a medical malpractice lawsuit against Ahmad, which he subsequently dropped.

Ahmad serves as the chief of adolescent and pediatric sports medicine and as the director of biomechanics research at the Center for Orthopaedic Research at Columbia University. He has authored more than 100 articles and book chapters related to knee, shoulder, elbow, and sports medicine and has given more than 100 lectures nationally and internationally. He is the author of the textbooks Pediatric and Adolescent Sports Injuries and Minimally Invasive Shoulder and Elbow Surgery, and the general interest book: "Skill: 40 Principles that Surgeons, Athletes, and Other Elite Performers Use to Achieve Mastery."

Ahmad has served on MLB research committees to address the high incidence of Tommy John Surgeries in professional baseball. He is the head team physician for the New York City Football Club, for local high schools and serves as consultant to local metropolitan gymnastics and swim teams. He also is the official medical provider to the Football Club Westchester Soccer Academy.

== Biography ==
Ahmad grew up in Long Island with a passion for playing soccer, and played in the New York Empire State Games, the Eastern Region Olympic Development Team, and four years of varsity soccer at the nationally-ranked Columbia University, graduating in 1990. He completed his orthopaedic surgery residency training at New York Orthopaedic Hospital of New York-Presbyterian/Columbia University Medical Center in 2000. In 2001, Ahmad completed a fellowship in sports medicine, which included physician team coverage for many professional teams including the LA Dodgers and LA Galaxy. He has authored more than 100 articles and book chapters related to knee, shoulder, elbow, and sports medicine, and has given more than 100 lectures nationally and internationally. He is the vice chairman of orthopaedic research at Columbia University Department of Orthopaedic Surgery and has ongoing research in the areas of ACL injury prevention and screening, biomechanics of the elbow, and surgical techniques for rotator cuff repair and shoulder instability.

=== Tommy John surgery ===
Ahmad has performed many Tommy John surgeries. This is an elbow surgery most commonly performed on collegiate and professional athletes, especially baseball players. It is known in the medical community as ulnar collateral ligament (UCL) reconstruction, a surgical graft procedure in which the ulnar collateral ligament in the medial elbow is replaced with a tendon from elsewhere in the body. Tommy John surgeries are being performed with greater frequency, leading to questions of whether sports elbow injuries are becoming more common or if players with elbow injuries are undergoing the surgery when it’s not necessary. In 2012 Ahmad published a paper regarding the public’s perception of the surgery. In it, he stated that 33% of coaches, 37% of parents, 51% of high school athletes, and 26% of collegiate athletes believed that Tommy John surgery should be performed on players without elbow injury to enhance performance.

=== New York Yankees ===
Ahmad began assisting the New York Yankees in 2008 and became the head team physician in 2009.

=== Lawsuit ===
On October 4, 2013, Alex Rodriguez filed a lawsuit against Ahmad for malpractice. The lawsuit said Rodriguez had kept playing and worsened a left hip injury in October 2012 because Ahmad didn’t tell him that an MRI had shown a joint tear. Rodriguez ultimately had surgery for the injury in January 2013, and his recuperation kept him from rejoining the Yankees until August of that year. On June 21, 2014, Rodriguez dropped the suit.

=== Crutches 4 Kids ===
Ahmad sits on the board of the charity Crutches 4 Kids with his wife Dr. Beth Shubin Stein and his brother-in-law Ken Shubin Stein.

=== Baseball Health Network ===
Ahmad is on the staff of the Baseball Health Network, an organization that helps young athletes learn the correct mechanics of pitching for elbow injury prevention.
