= Nick Shalosky =

American lawyer

Nicholas Shalosky, born November 12, 1987, is a native South Carolina attorney and politician. While still in college, he won a seat as a write-in candidate for the Charleston County Constituent District No. 20 School Board using only campaigning on the Internet through Facebook; he did not spend any funds. He won with 22 votes. He represented the 20th District, downtown Charleston, for a four-year term, which ended in 2012.

Shalosky is the first openly gay elected official in South Carolina history. When elected, Shalosky was the youngest openly gay elected official in the United States.

== Personal life and education ==
Nick Shalosky grew up in Conway, South Carolina. He "came out" about his sexuality during his sophomore year of high school. His mother, Vanessa Viles Shalosky, has spoken of her experiences raising a gay child at Charleston School of Law's "My Gay Child" forum.

He attended the College of Charleston where he was a political science major. In his undergraduate years, he was a member of the South Carolina Student Legislature, and the Charleston 40. He graduated in 2010 with a degree in Political Science and Geography. He went to Charleston School of Law, where he also served as a research assistant, and was a member of the Moot Court Board. He was a MUSC Presidential Scholar and served as the President of the Alliance for Equality.

Nick Shalosky has been a public figure about his sexuality; he spoke at Myrtle Beach and South Carolina Pride gatherings; in 2009 he attended the National Equality March in Washington, D.C.

In March 2013 during his last semester of the Charleston School of Law, Shalosky traveled to Washington, DC to hear oral argument related to same-sex marriage cases at the US Supreme Court. California's Proposition 8 was assessed in terms of the constitutionality of marriage equality (or inequality) at the state level, while the Defense of Marriage Act (DOMA) case challenged federal law.

He graduated in 2013 with a Juris Doctor. Shalosky incorporated his experiences into a 2014 class offering at the Charleston School of Law, "Gender Issues and the Law," which he developed as a Diversity Fellow.

== Marriage and family ==
He and his partner Naylor Brownell, a medical resident, became engaged New Year's Eve in 2012 but could not legally marry in the state of South Carolina until November 2014.

== Political career ==
Shalosky was involved in politics in the late 2000s and became the secretary of the SC Stonewall Democrats chapter; he was also one of the founding board members of the group. He learned about the Stonewall Democrats through Tom Chorlton, a professor and former executive director of the National Gay & Lesbian Democratic Club, a forerunner organization of the Stonewall Democrats. Shalosky participated in the 2008 presidential campaigns volunteering for Joe Biden, Hillary Clinton, and the successful candidate Barack Obama. At local events he questioned Republican candidates on their positions on gay rights.

He also ran his own campaign as a write-in candidate for the Charleston County School Board. This resulted from his findings during an independent research project at the College of Charleston on the impacts of new technology and the Internet on local elections. Learning of a school board seat that had not attracted candidates 2 weeks before the election, Shalosky he established a moderate online presence using the social networking site Facebook to promote his candidacy. "I thought it would be interesting to see how students could use social networking sites to get one of their own elected." He did not spend any money to campaign. At the time, Obama's campaign was being praised for its use of social media to engage younger voters.

According to The Digitel, Shalosky said he was conducting a "social experiment" to see how use of Facebook could affect a local campaign.

He wrote on Facebook:

"I am doing sort of an experiment to see how Facebook can really effect {sic} a local campaign. Write in my name Nicholas Shalosky and see if we can get any attention. If you think I'm being too egotistical I wouldn't mind deciding on a name to vote for, but I think it would be interesting to see what happens on election day!"

Preliminary election results showed different winners, who were sworn in and attended meetings, than were ultimately certified by the election board following the count of votes for write-in candidates. Shalosky won a seat on the 7-member school board based on the 22 votes cast for him. He had no opponent for the seat. He represented downtown Charleston's 20th District for a four-year term, starting in November 2008.

He said, "Such rapid mobilization might not have been possible only two years ago. But with a Facebook page and a knowledge of online organizing, I secured my winning margin without spending a penny." He was the only school board member elected who was under 40 years old. His professor Bill Moore said Shalosky would start an "independent study of Internet use in politics as part of his curriculum." Post and Courier columnist Ken burger noted that while more traditional advertising of radio and television had also changed the way politicians get votes, those mediums were "top-to-bottom communication," but the Internet allowed "grass-roots groups to dictate outcomes." Burger believed that Shalosky's campaign was the beginning of what will likely be major change to local politics due to use of the Internet.

During his term, in 2010 Shalosky was elected by the board members as vice-chairman of the District 20 Constituent Board. He later was elected by them as the board's chairperson, a rotating position.

== Honors ==
- In March 2009 the local Charleston City Paper critics' awards honored Shalosky in their "Best of Charleston" issue with "Best Display of Gumption by a 20-something."
- In June 2009 Shalosky and six other openly LGBT politicos were named in The Advocate's annual 'Forty people under 40 years old to watch' list along with "out U.S. Rep. Jared Polis, D-Colo.; Obama administration staffer Jamie Citron; New York City mayoral aide James Anderson; fundraiser Aisha C. Mills; and DNC member Jason Rae."
- Shalosky was selected as a Diversity Fellow starting January 2014 at the Charleston School of Law.
