= Quirinus (disambiguation) =

Quirinus may refer to:

- Quirinus, a Roman god

== A given name ==
Forms of the Latin name Quirinus are Quirino (Italian), Quirijn and Krijn (Dutch), and Quirin (German).

- Saint Quirinus (disambiguation), several different saints with the name Quirinus
- Quirinus van Amelsfoort (1760–1820), Dutch painter
- Quirinus Harder (1801–1880), Dutch architect
- Quirinus Kuhlmann (1651–1689), German poet and mystic
- Quirinus Quirrell, a fictional teacher in Harry Potter and the Philosopher's Stone

== See also ==
- Quirinius, Roman aristocrat, Governor of Syria
- Angelo Maria Quirini or Querini, Italian Cardinal
- Elisabetta Querini or Quirini, Dogaressa of Venice
- Querini Stampalia (disambiguation), family name
