= Saint Quirinus =

Saint Quirinus (or Cyrinus) may refer to:

- Quirinus of Rome:
  - Quirinus of Neuss (feast day: April 30)
  - Quirinus of Tegernsee (feast day: March 25)
- Quirinus of Sescia (feast day: June 4)
- Quirinus of Tivoli (feast day: June 4)
- Quirinus (Africa) (feast day: June 3), accompanied by Saint Abidianus and Saint Papocinicus
- Quirinus of the grouping Nicasius, Quirinus, Scubiculus, and Pientia (feast day: October 11), venerated as martyrs and saints

== See also ==
- Saint-Quirin, French commune
- San Quirino, Italian commune
