= Juraj of Topusko =

Croatian Catholic priest (c. 1450–1498)

- Auxiliary Bishop of Zagreb
- Church: Cathedral of the Assumption of Mary, Zagreb
- Archdiocese: Archdiocese of Zagreb
- Elected: before 1495

Orders
- Ordination: 1488

Personal details
- Born: c. 1450 Sjeničak, Karlovac
- Died: 1498 (aged 47–48) Zagreb
- Denomination: Catholic

Juraj of Topusko (Latin: Georgius; c. 1450–1498) was a Croatian Catholic priest who lived in the 15th century. Also known as Juraj of Steničnjak, the Cistercian bishop of Zagreb is best known for the missal he commissioned around 1495.

== Life ==
Information about Juraj's life is scarce, but work by Croatian historian Milan Pelc of the University of Zagreb suggests that he was born around 1450 in the village of Sjeničak, between Topusko and Karlovac, and became abbot of the Cistercian abbey in Topusko aged 18. Some time later he became a canon of Zagreb, was ordained a bishop in 1488, and was made an auxiliary bishop by the time he commissioned in the missal. He consecrated the altar of the Virgin Mary in the Zagreb Cathedral in 1496, and died two years later.

== Missal ==
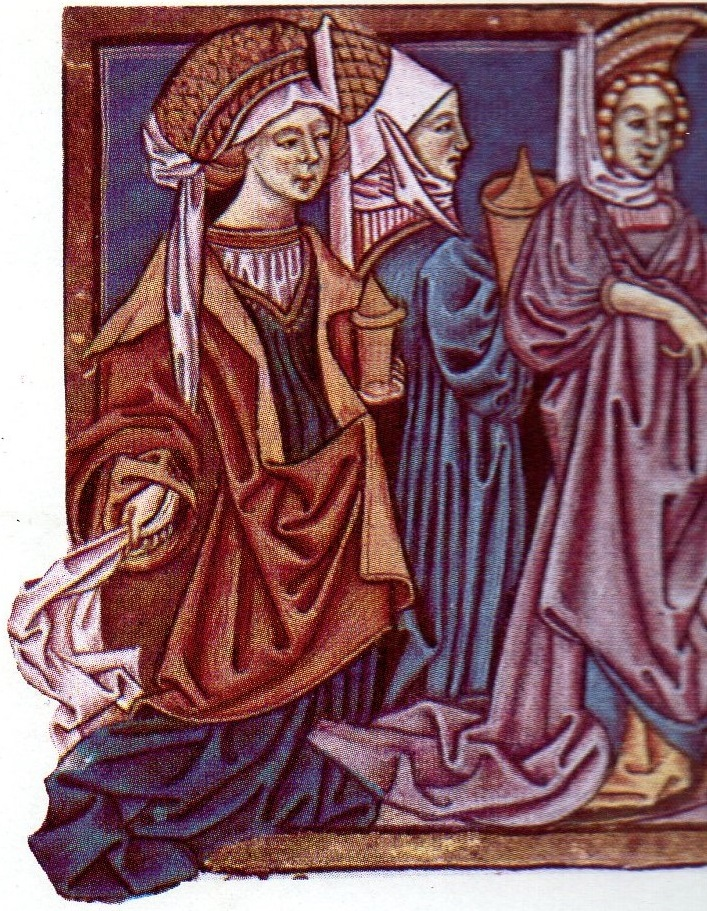
Three women depicted in the Missal of Juraj de Topusko

The Missal of Topusko consists of two illuminated codices with blackletter text featuring art attributed to the miniaturist Hans Alemanus and the illuminator Julije Klović. The art depicts both Croatian and Hungarian saints, and popular saints such as Ladislaus I of Hungary and Quirinus of Sescia.

Though Juraj of Topusko commissioned the missal, he did not live to see its completion; after his death in 1498, the work was taken up by Cardinal Toma Bakač, Bishop of Eger and Ostrogon, and later by Aleksandar Ignacije Mikulić, bishop of Zagreb, who commissioned the cover. It is likely that the inner illustrations were completed at the order of Šimun Erdődy, Bishop of Zagreb from 1518 to 1543. Juraj himself is depicted on the opening page, kneeling next to Saint Barbara in devotion to the Holy Trinity and the Virgin Mary. The missal is now located in the Zagreb Cathedral under the purview of the diocese's Office for Cultural Property.

== See also ==
- Catholic Church in Croatia
