= Hendrik Martenszoon Sorgh =

Dutch painter (c. 1610–1670)

Hendrik Martensz Sorgh
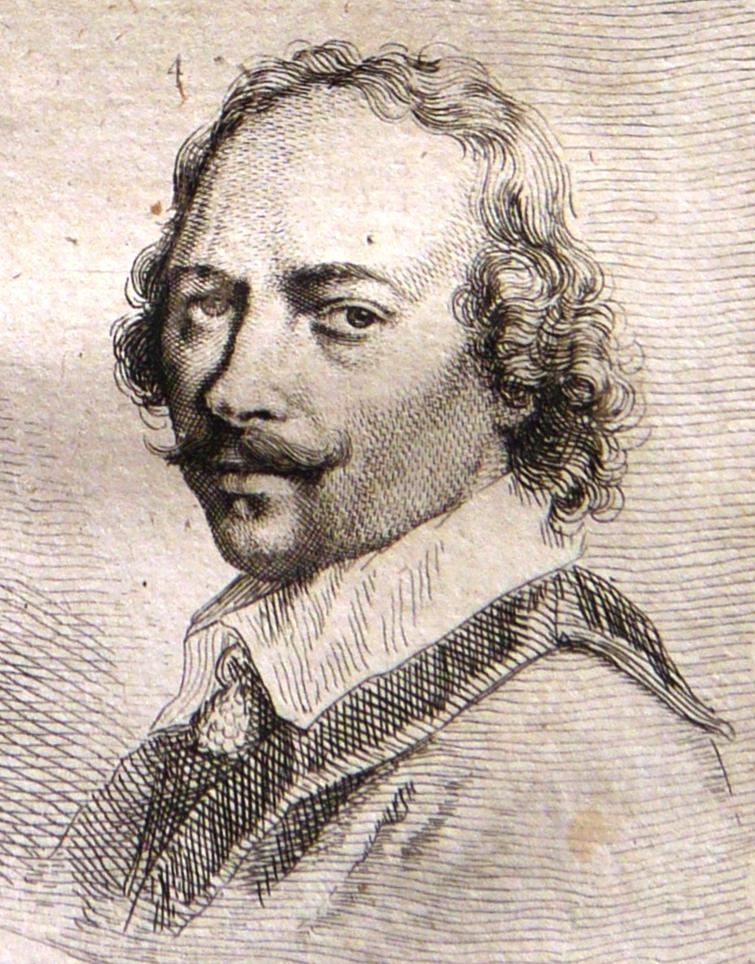
- Hendrik Martensz Sorgh
- Born: Hendrik Martensz; 1610; Rotterdam
- Died: 28 June 1670; Rotterdam
- Known for: Painting
- Movement: Baroque seascapes

Hendrik Martenszoon Sorgh (c. 1610 – buried 28 June 1670) was a Dutch Golden Age painter of genre works.

== Biography ==
Born in Rotterdam, Sorgh became a pupil of David Teniers the Younger and Willem Pieterszoon Buytewech. Sorgh painted mostly interiors with peasants. His kitchen interiors feature elaborate still lifes. He also painted market scenes, portraits, and marine and historical scenes. Sorgh's works include, for example, A Man Writing, Interior with Jacob and Esau, and A Kitchen.

He married Adriaantje Hollaer on 20 February 1633. She became famous in 1947 because of her marriage portrait which had been painted by Rembrandt and was pictured on the Dutch 100-guilder banknote, printed from 1947 - 1950. Through her sister, he was brother-in-law to his friend the painter Crijn Hendricksz Volmarijn. Her portrait by Rembrandt was long considered a pendant companion to a portrait of him, but it is no longer certain since an 18th-century engraving of that portrait held the caption Nicholas Berchem. The engraved portrait of him in Arnold Houbraken's The Great Theatre of Dutch Painters was based on his self-portrait, currently in a private collection.

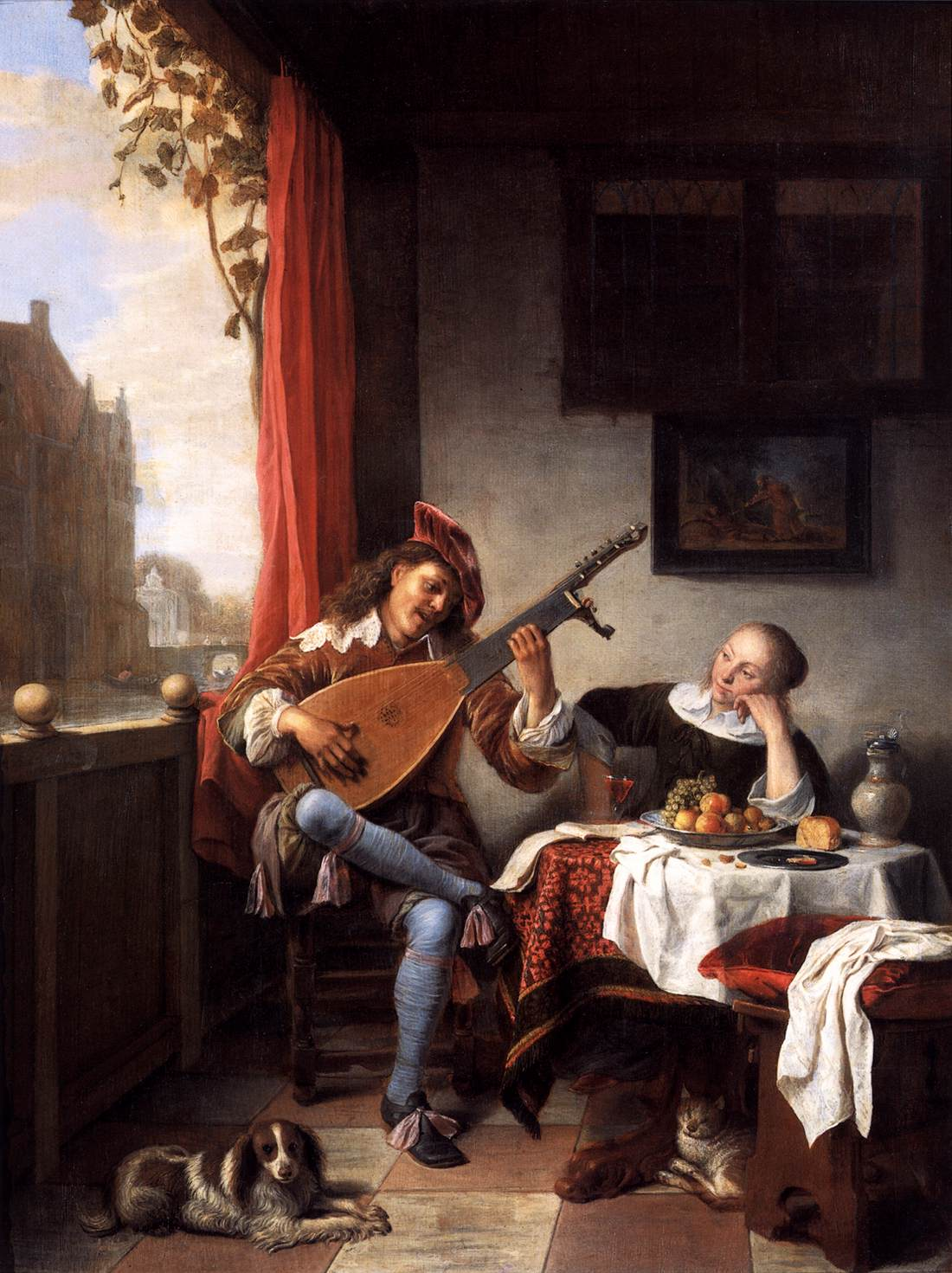
Interior scene by Sorgh

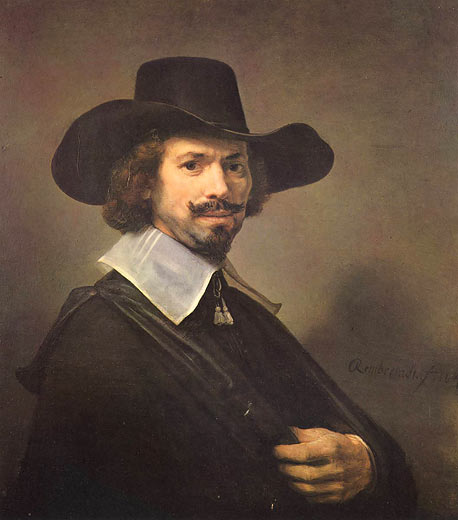
Marriage portrait of a man with a large black hat by Rembrandt's workshop, formerly thought to be Nicolaes Berchem, Hendrik Sorgh, and Carel Fabricius

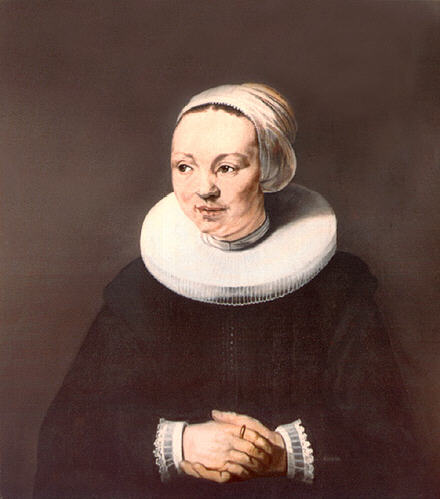
Marriage portrait of his wife Adriaantje Hollaer, painted by Rembrandt's workshop, around the same time and considered a pendant to the man with the hat

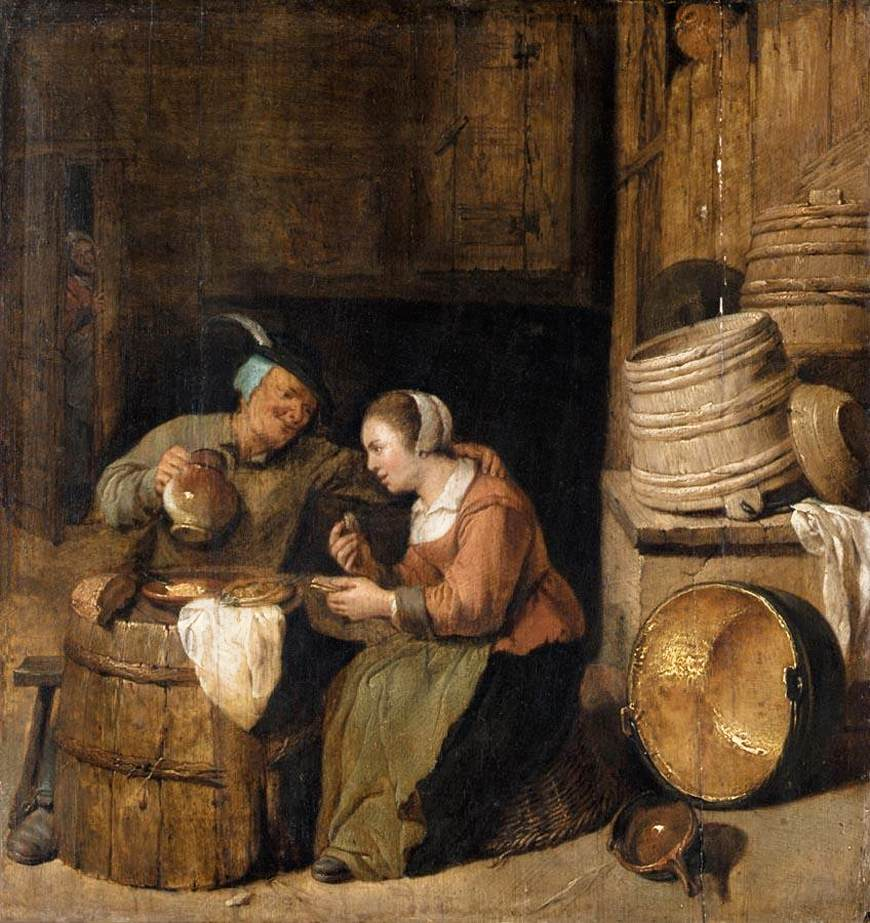
An Interior Scene

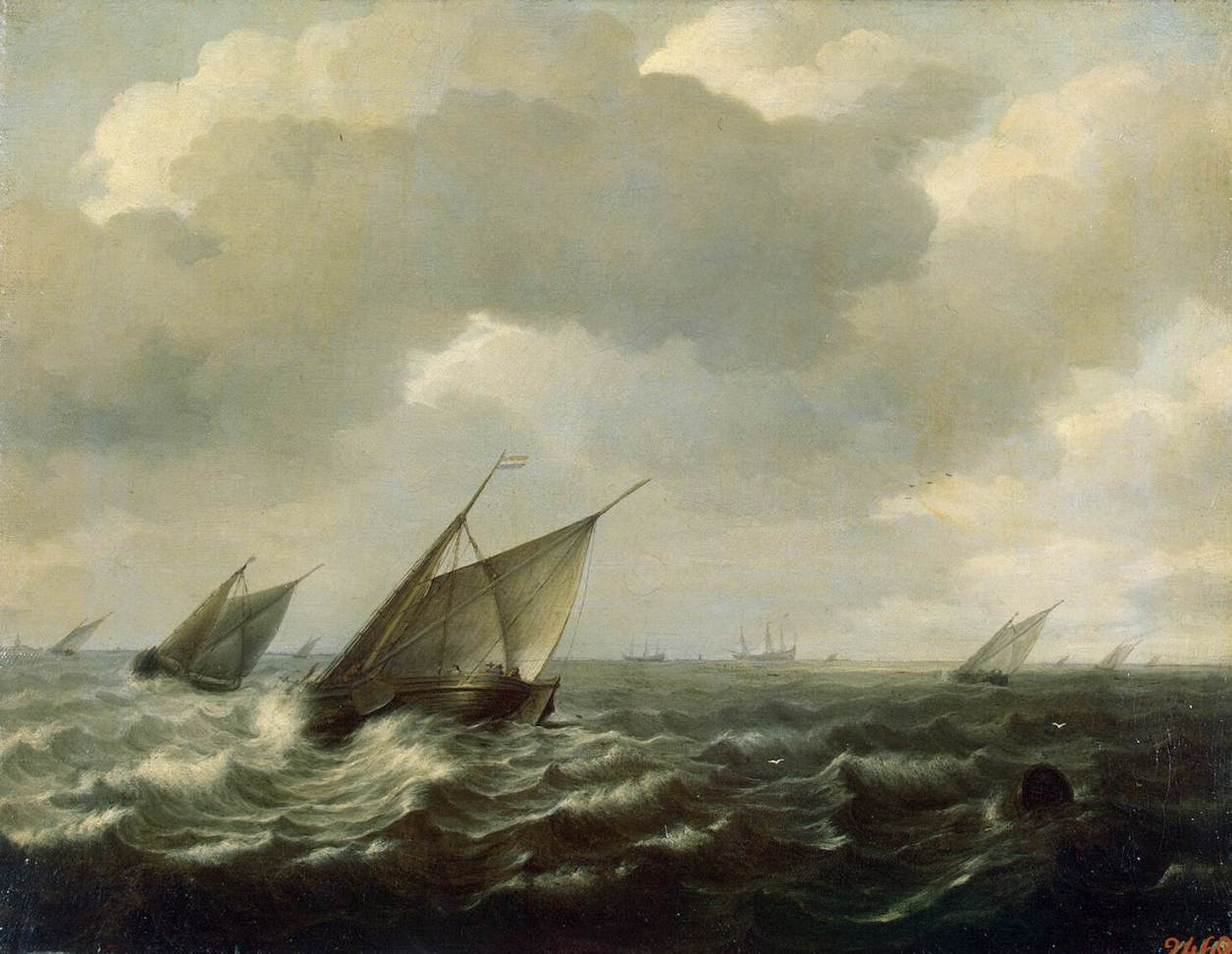
Sailing in a strong Wind

In 1659 he became headman of the Rotterdam Guild of St. Luke. His pupils were Jacobus Blauvoet, Abraham Diepraam, Cornelis Dorsman, Pieter Nijs, and Pieter Crijnse Volmarijn.

There is also a painting by Hendrick Sorgh in the Hunterian Art Gallery ("Interior with Card Players") in Glasgow, Scotland.
