= Pieter Crijnse Volmarijn =

Dutch Golden Age painter

Pieter Crijnse Volmarijn (1629–1679) was a Dutch Golden Age painter.

Volmarijn was born and died in Rotterdam. According to the RKD he was a pupil of Hendrik Martensz Sorgh and Nicolaes Knüpfer and worked in Utrecht. He was possibly the son or nephew of Crijn Hendricksz Volmarijn.
