= Querini Stampalia =

There are several entries linked with the family name of Querini Stampalia, a branch of the Querini:

- Fondazione Querini Stampalia, a cultural institution in Venice, Italy
- Pinacoteca Querini Stampalia, an art collection and museum in Venice, Italy
- Astypalaia or Stampalia, a Greek island where the name Querini Stampalia originated

== See also ==
- Quirinus (disambiguation)
