= Nicodemus Visiting Christ =

1899 painting by Henry Ossawa Tanner

Nicodemus Before Christ
- Nicodemus Coming to Christ, Nicodemus
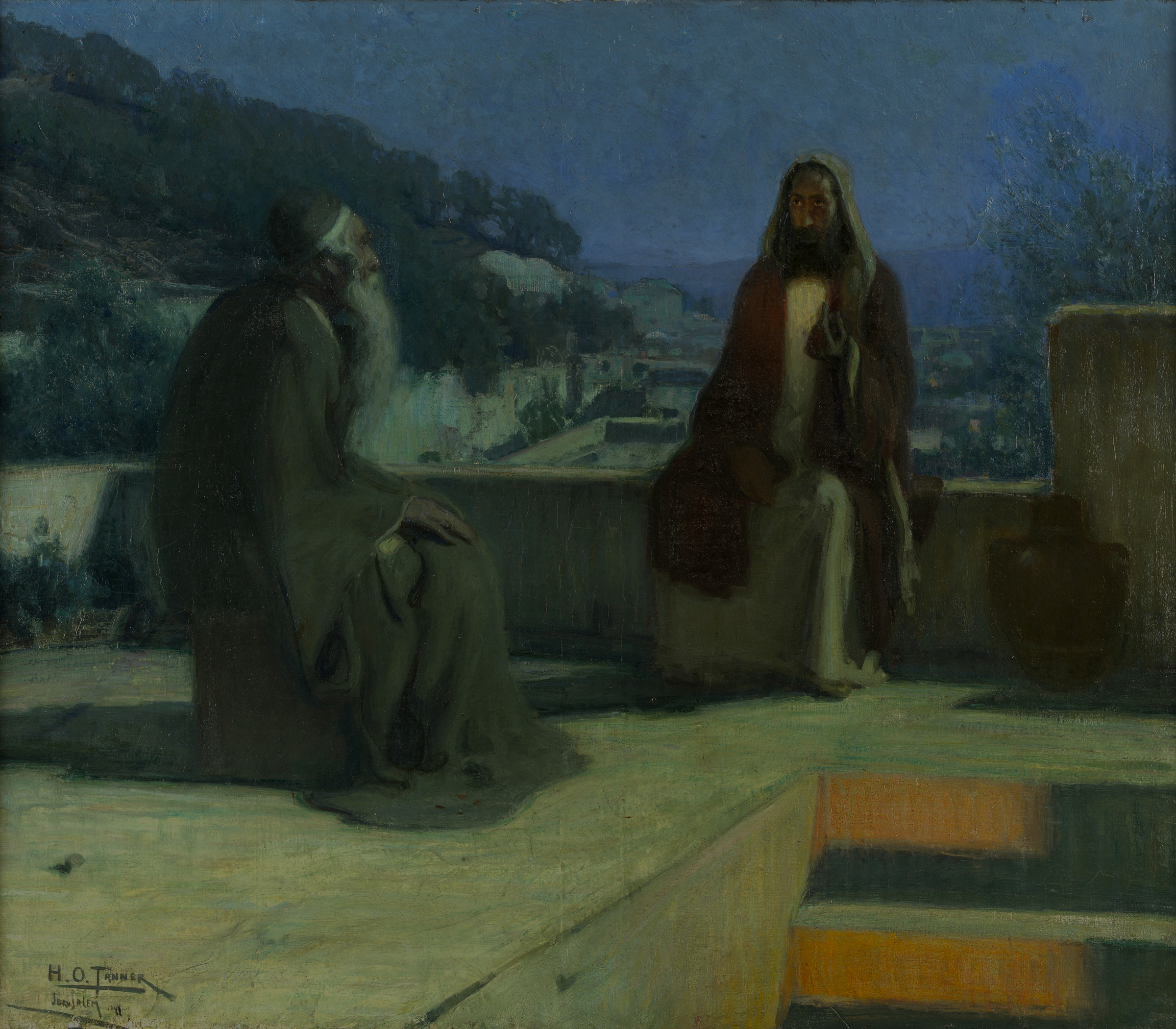
- Nicodemus Visiting Jesus, by Henry Ossawa Tanner
- Artist: Henry Ossawa Tanner
- Year: 1899
- Subject: Christ's discourse with Nicodemus
- Dimensions: (33 11/16 in × 39 1/2 in)
- Location: Pennsylvania Academy of Fine Arts, Philadelphia
- Accession: 1900.1

Nicodemus Visiting Christ is a painting by Henry Ossawa Tanner, made in Jerusalem in 1899 during the artist's second visit to Palestine. The painting is biblical, featuring Nicodemus talking privately to Christ in the evening, and is an example of Tanner's nocturnal light paintings, in which the world is shown in night light.

It was Tanner's entry to the 1899 Paris Salon. The painting was purchased by the Wilstadt Collection in Philadelphia and is now in the Pennsylvania Academy of Fine Arts (PAFA), Tanner's Alma Mater in the United States. It won the Lippincott Prize for the best figurative work at PAFA's annual exhibition in 1899.

== Religious paintings ==
Nicodemus Visiting Jesus was inspired by the Gospel of John, 3:1-21.

There was a man of the Pharisees, named Nicodemus, a ruler of the Jews: The same came to Jesus by night, and said unto him, Rabbi, we know that thou art a teacher come from God: for no man can do these miracles that thou doest, except God be with him. Jesus answered and said unto him, Verily, verily, I say unto thee, Except a man be born again, he cannot see the kingdom of God. Nicodemus saith unto him, How can a man be born when he is old? can he enter the second time into his mother's womb, and be born? Jesus answered, Verily, verily, I say unto thee, Except a man be born of water and of the Spirit, he cannot enter into the kingdom of God. That which is born of the flesh is flesh; and that which is born of the Spirit is spirit. Marvel not that I said unto thee, Ye must be born again.

Nicodemus became a convert after the evening's conversation.

The painting was among a lifetime of work illustrating biblical stories. The story was important to Tanner's father, Benjamin Tucker Tanner, who considered it "biblical precedent for the worship habits of African-American slaves" in their practice of worshiping at night.

Tanner's father, an African Methodist Episcopal Church Bishop, had wanted Tanner to follow him into the ministry. In becoming an artist, Tanner disappointed his father's dream; however his brush created paintings of which his father could approve.

By 1908, when Tanner held his "first major solo exhibition" in the United States (the first after having become famous), he was known for his religious artwork. The exhibition featured a long list of religious subjects, 33 paintings including: Abraham's Oak, Behold, the Bridegroom Cometh, Christ and Nicodemus, Christ at the Home of Mary and Martha, Christ on the Road to Bethany, Christ Washing the Disciples’ Feet, Daniel in the Lions’ Den, Death of Judas, The Disciples See Christ Walking on the Water, Escape of Paul, Flight into Egypt, The Good Shepherd, He Vanished Out of Their Sight, Head of Old Jew, Hebron, The Hiding of Moses, Hills near Jerusalem, Jerusalem Types (4 under this name), Judas Covenanting with the High Priests, Mary, Mary Pondered All These Things in Her Heart, Moonlight—Hebron, Moses and the Burning Bush, Nicodemus, Night (After the Denial by Peter), Night of the Nativity, On the Road to Emmaus, Return of the Holy Women, Two Disciples at the Tomb, The Wise Men.

Missing from the exhibition were famous works whose museums would not release them: The Annunciation, The Resurrection of Lazarus and The Pilgrims of Emmaus.

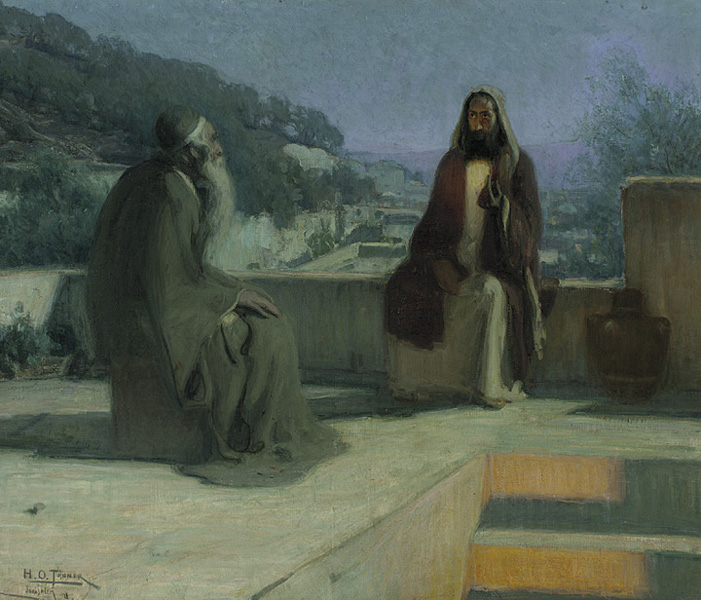
Image from the Pennsylvania Academy of Fine Arts.

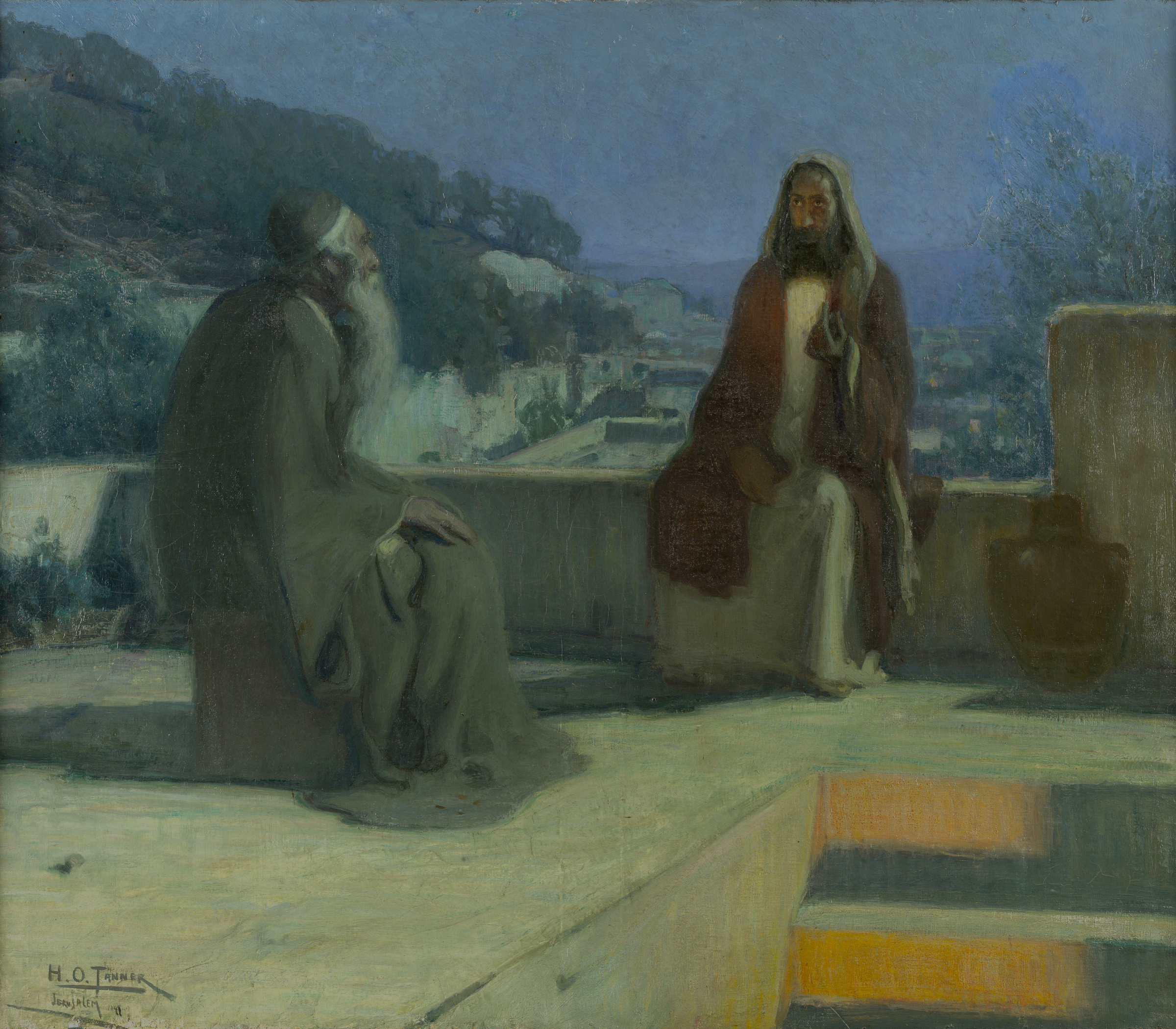
Another digital copy, lightened for cell phone screens.

== Evening light ==
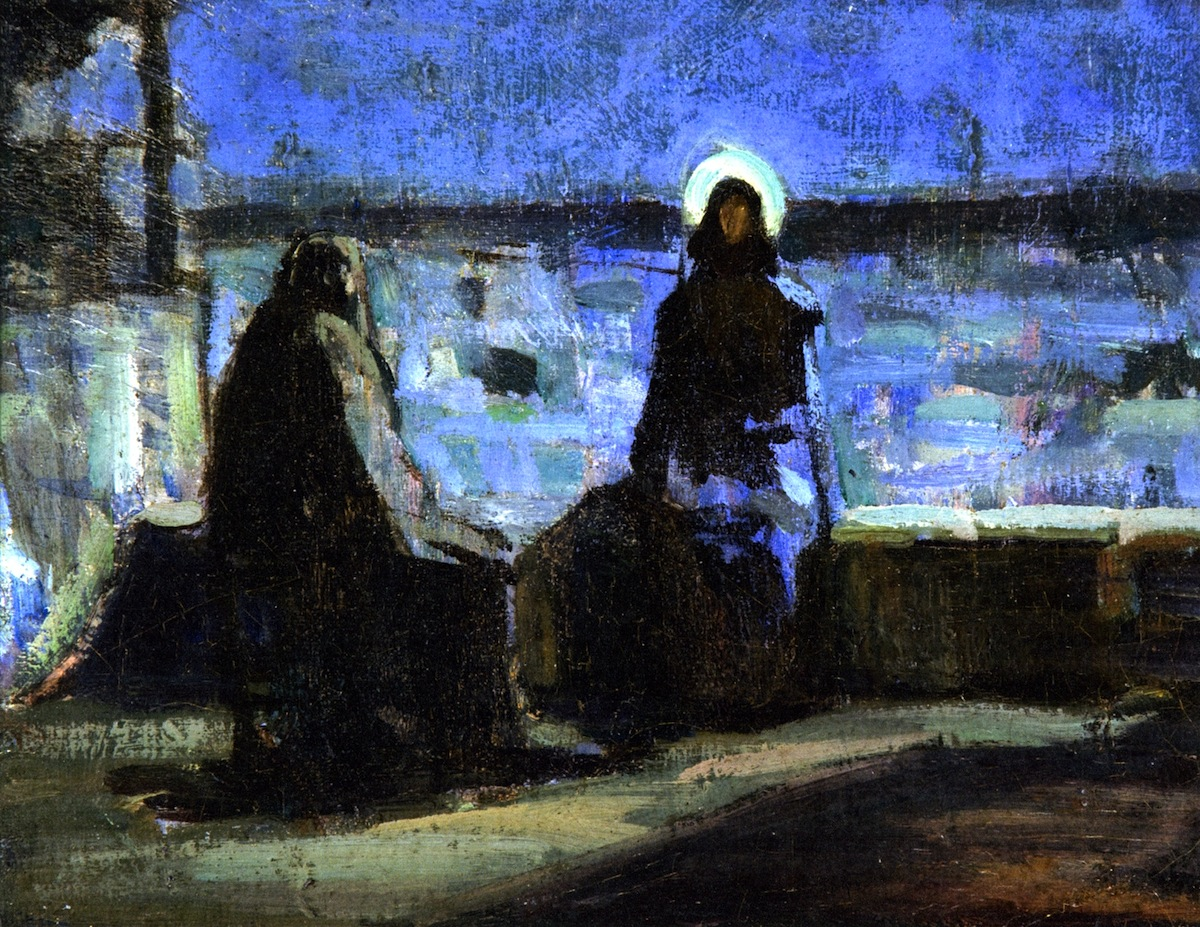
Study painting for Nicodemus Visiting Christ. The Moon forms a halo in Tanner's painting, natural features of the world revealing holiness.

A newspaper commented in 1909 that Tanner found the daylight in the Middle East harsh and chose to paint at night. Helen Cole, writing for Brush and Pencil commented on the choice of lighting at night, calling it a "moonlight scene, only the two figures, enveloped in a cold blue light...the effect of night and remoteness and loneliness was exceedingly well rendered."

Tanner lit the Nicodemus Visiting Christ with multiple sources of light. The sky is lit with twilight (in which the Sun's rays come from below the horizon and are filtered through the atmosphere, casting blueish light). Moonlight is present, casting distinct shadows and warmer green-yellow light on the rooftop, distant buildings and trees. Orange light as from a candle or fire is reflected on the stairs from below, lighting the face of Christ.

Tanner used light to indicate holiness. In paintings such as the Holy Family, Tanner used light from elsewhere to illuminate the veil of Mary, making it glow in darkness, the baby Jesus also in light. In Invitation to Christ to Enter by his Disciples at Emmaus, the light centers on Christ as if emitting from him.

In this Nicodemus Visiting Jesus, light also indicates holiness. The study painting for this showed Christ silhouetted by the Moon, creating a halo. In the final painting, the effect was more subtle, the moonlight reflecting on the cloth over Christ's head and glowing on his chest, the firelight lighting his face. And Tanner shows Nicodemus having approached Jesus, who is lit with ambient light to imply holiness.

And this is the condemnation, that light is come into the world, and men loved darkness rather than light, because their deeds were evil. For every one that doeth evil hateth the light, neither cometh to the light, lest his deeds should be reproved. But he that doeth truth cometh to the light, that his deeds may be made manifest, that they are wrought in God.

== Multiculturalism ==
Depictions of Jesus Christ

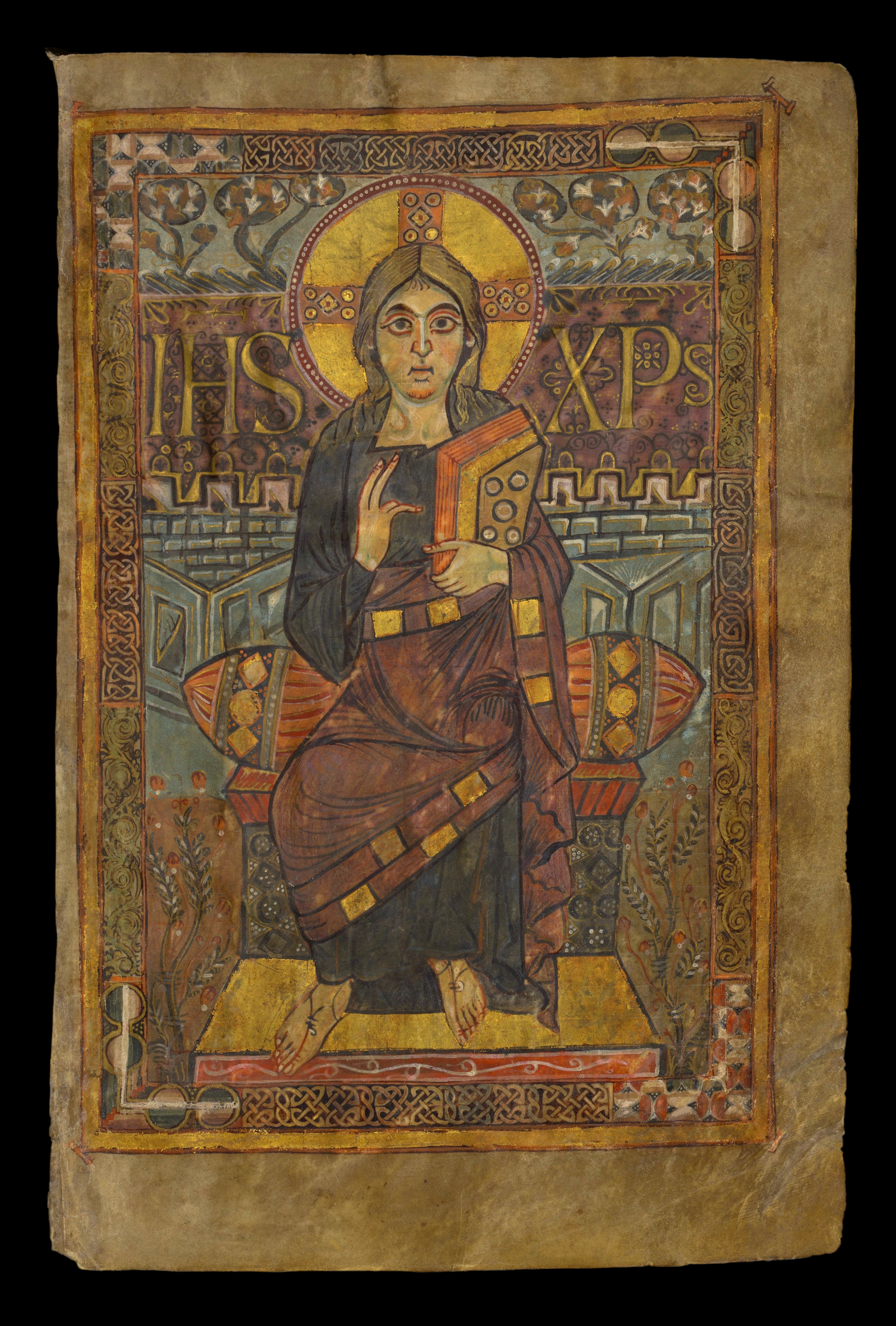
European depiction of Christ, 781-783 C.E. Christ in Majesty, from the Evangéliaire dit de Charlemagne.

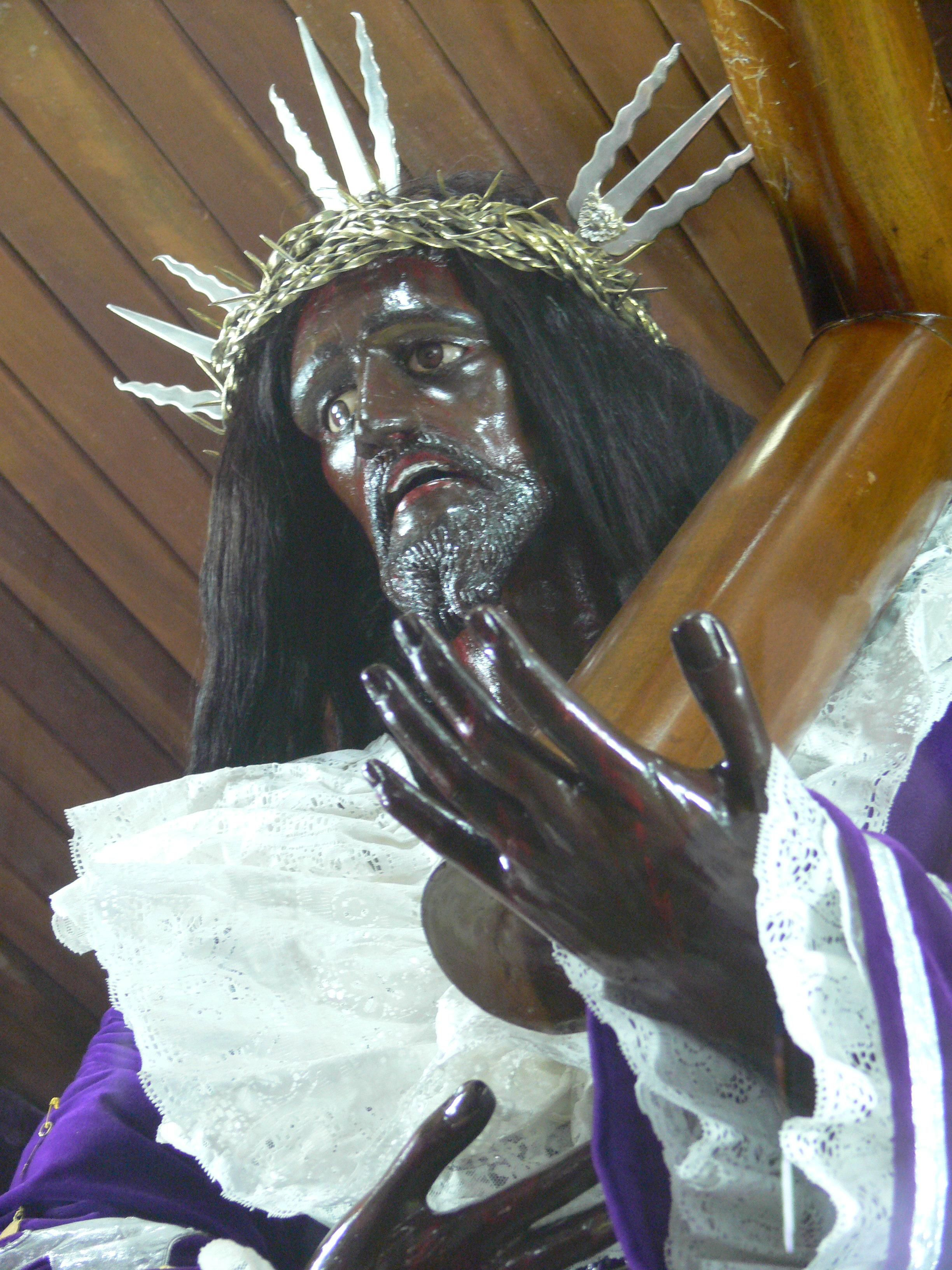
Statue of The Black Christ, 1884, in Portabello, Panama.

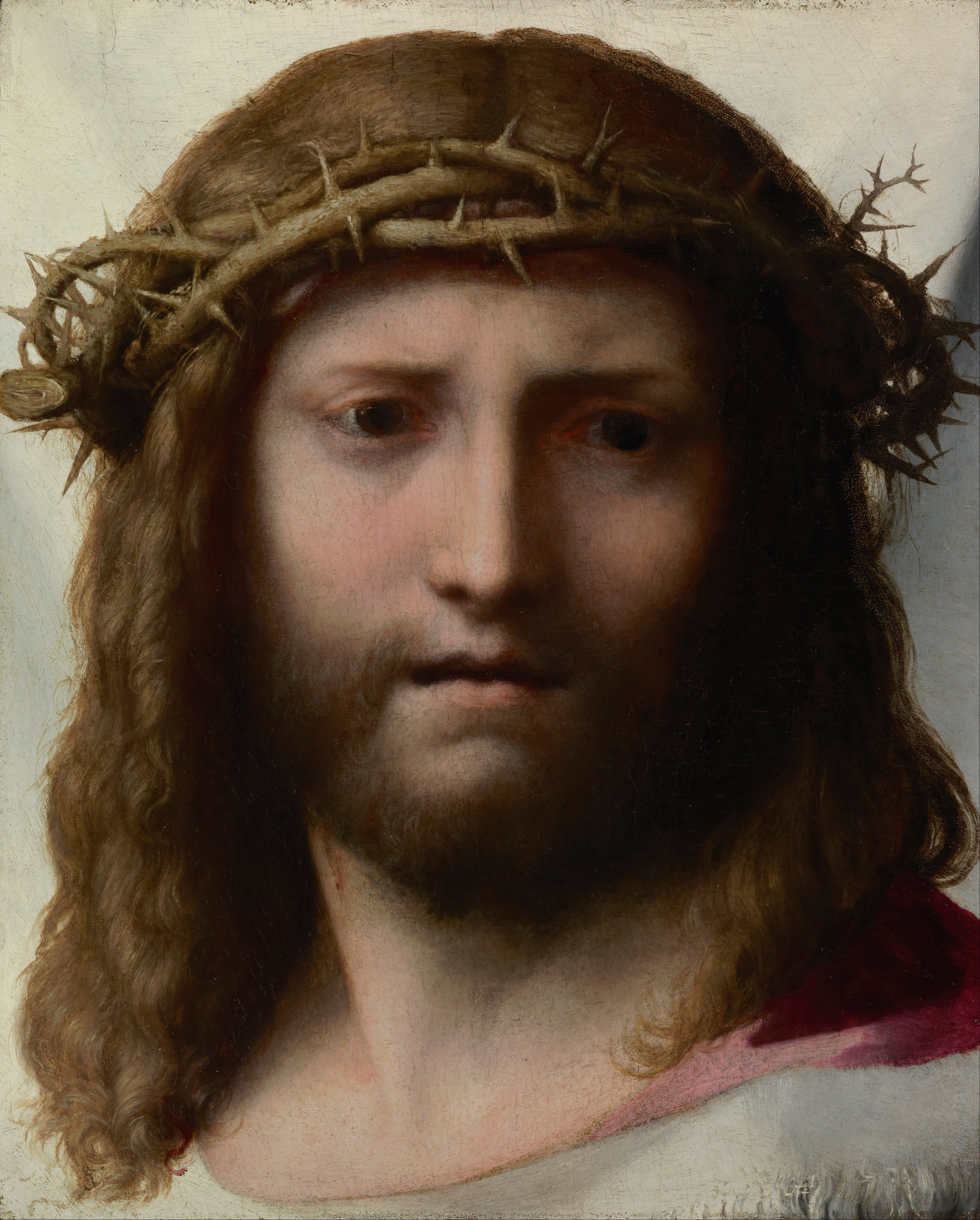
Head of Christ by Antonio Allegri, 1525-1530

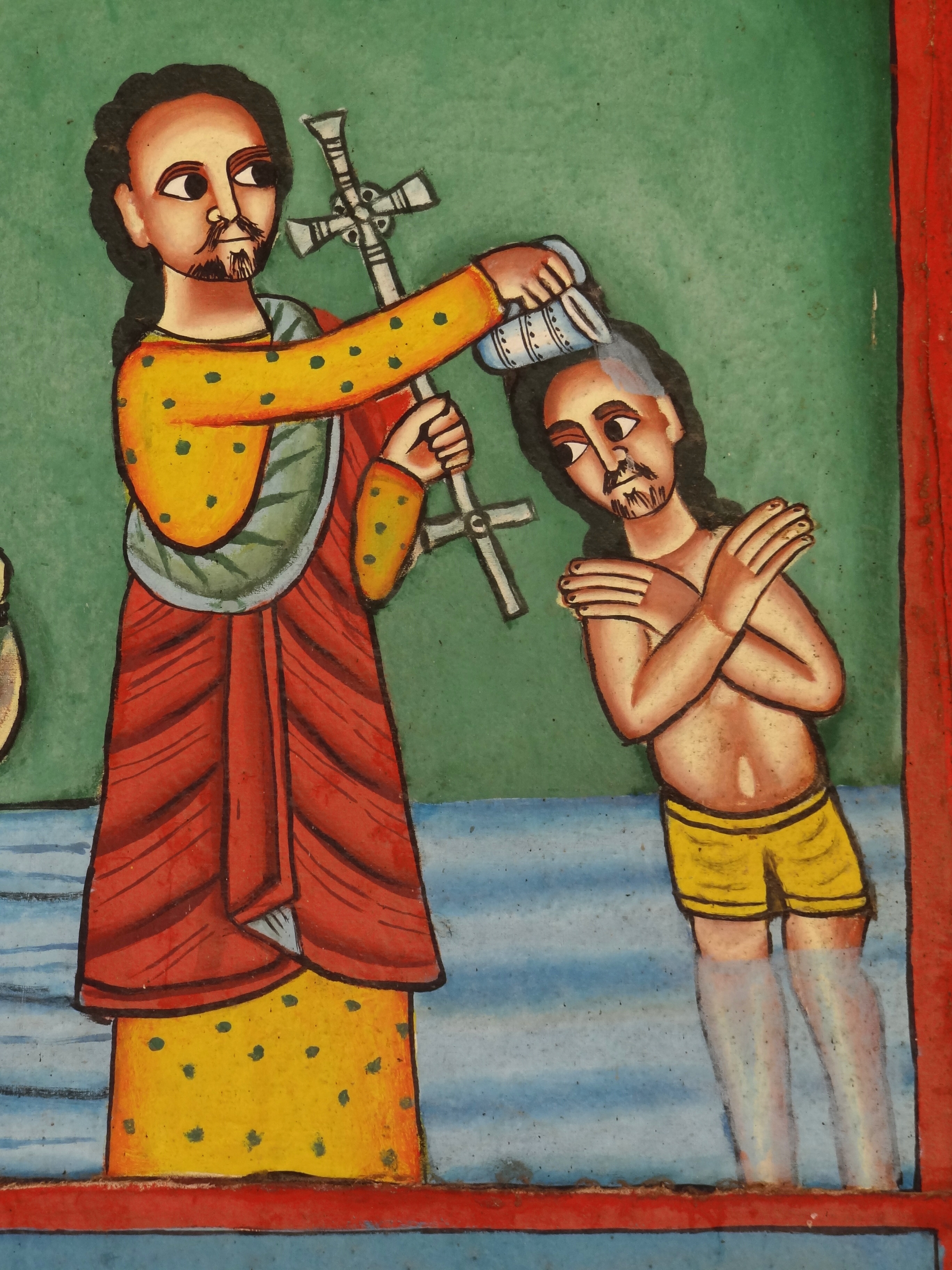
Baptism of Jesus by John the Baptist, Yesus Church - Axum (Aksum) - Ethiopia

People have made Christ look like themselves across the world.

See Race and appearance of Jesus, Depiction of Jesus

European and American artwork in the 19th and 20th centuries tended to show Jesus as a white man, often glowing white, and Jewish people as having European features. Similarly, there was and is a movement promoting a colored or non-white Jesus.

Rather than focus on race when painting Jesus, Tanner created a "cosmopolitan" Christ, a "universal" figure meant to be viewed religiously rather than in a racial sense. Further, Tanner wanted his paintings to be viewed without consideration of the artist's race. Tanner chose to portray experiences common to everyone, a quiet evening conversation and a teaching moment, a common focus to bring people together with "religious language" that they had in common. He chose to paint ordinary human experiences, places, and relationships to "connect rather than to divide viewers." He found that in France this was possible, while in America, newspaper reviewers tended to focus on his race instead of on his art.

The tendency to consider Tanner's artwork in terms of race hasn't ended; race is one of the elements looked at in the United States when considering artwork. Who made the painting, and did they have a message (even unintentionally) about race? Because of this history, those studying his Tanner's art in the United States have commented on Tanner's depiction of race in the image and how the shadows and "conflicting light sources" in the image "look deliberately calculated by the artist to obfuscate the figure's (Christ's) appearance." Similarly it has been noticed that in Flight into Egypt (1899), Tanner painted people who were rendered indistinctly in twilight, so that it was difficult to pin them down as being from a particular race or ethnic group; people could imagine their own in the painting.

Tanner had an eye for details of race and ethnicity which he applied to observing people in the Middle East. Tanner (like other Orientalists) catalogued the way people in the Middle East looked, the varieties of racial and ethnicities and painted with these. The painting Nicodemus Before Christ shows results of observations. He made study paintings throughout his trips, including one used for this artwork; the Nicodemus in this painting is thought to be based on Head of a Jew in Palestine, a study painting which Tanner would keep and rework throughout his lifetime. Tanner depicted Jesus more ambiguously than was standard for an American; even though symbolically lit to show holiness, Tanner's Jesus could be seen as Semitic or of mixed race, or he could be seen as maybe white.

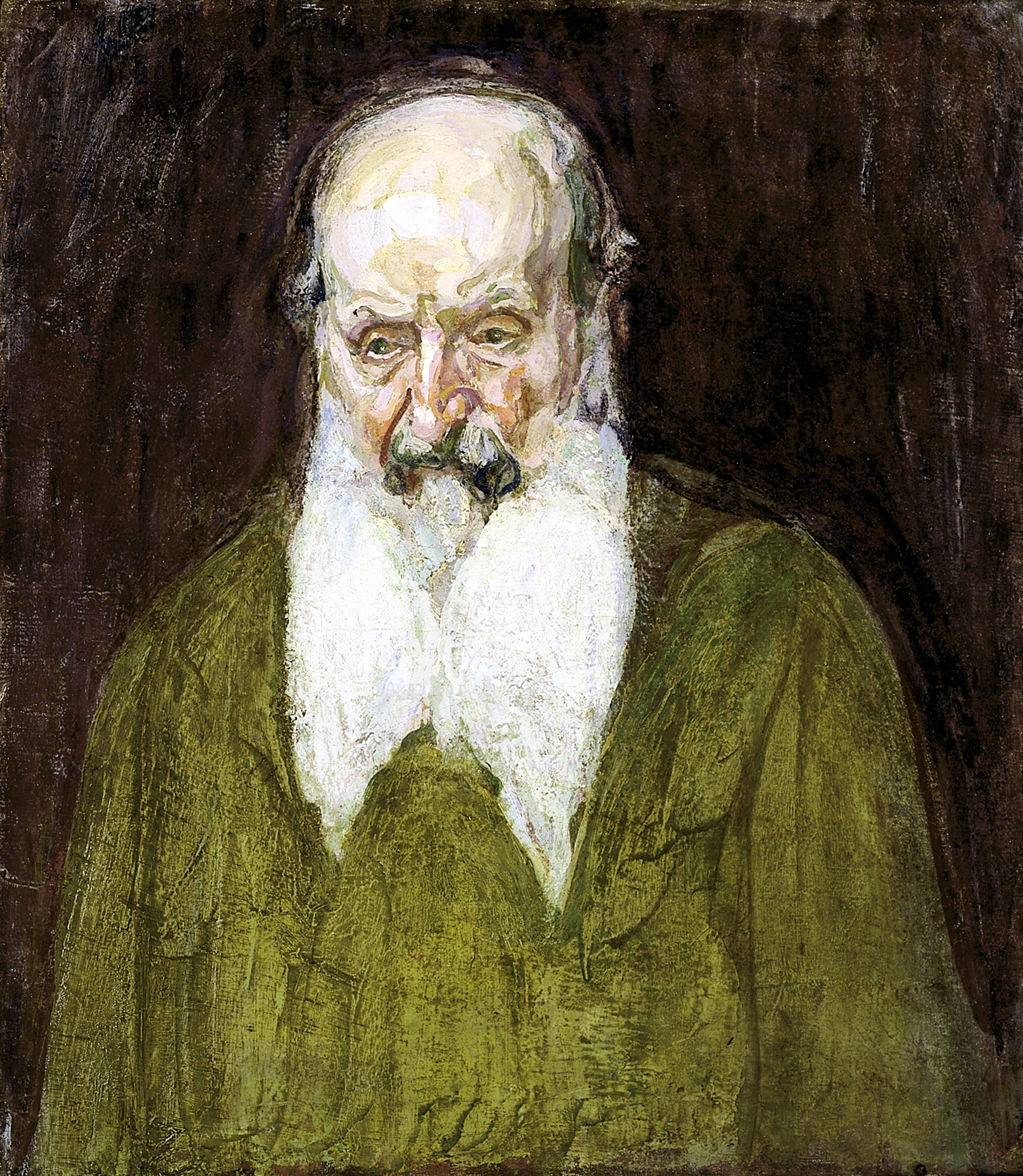
Study of a Jewish man, circa 1899, that Tanner would rework throughout his lifetime. Thought to be used as a model for Nicodemus in Nicodemus Visiting Christ.

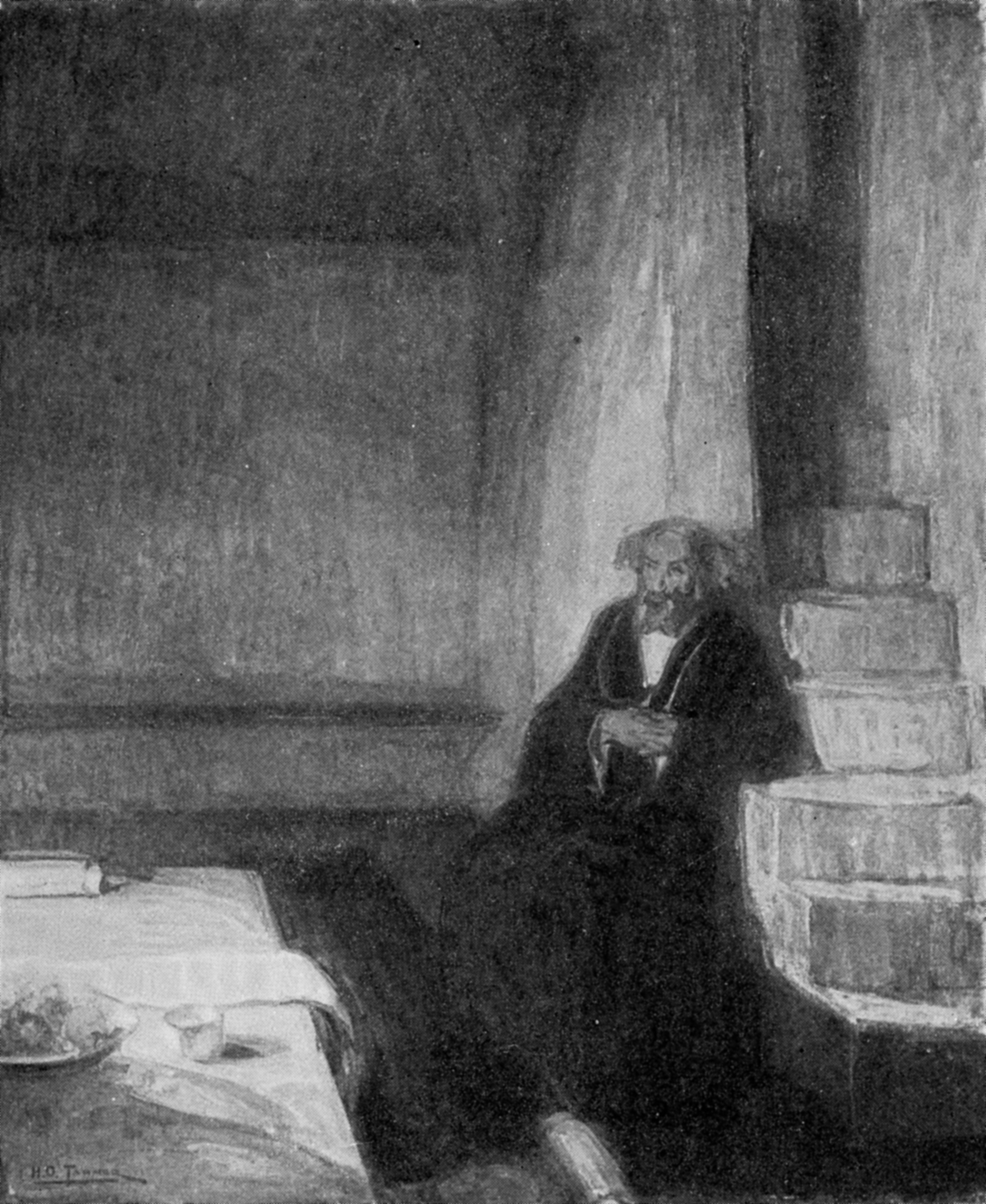
Another version of Nicodemus, painted for the Alaska–Yukon–Pacific Exposition in 1909.

== See also ==
- List of paintings by Henry Ossawa Tanner
