= Nicasius, Quirinus, Scubiculus, and Pientia =

Catholic martyrs and saints

Saints Nicasius, Quirinus, Scubiculus, and Pientia
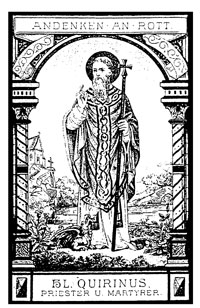
- St. Quirinus of Malmedy

Martyrs
- Died: ca AD 285; Vexin
- Venerated in: Roman Catholic Church
- Major shrine: Malmedy Abbey
- Feast: 11 October
- Attributes: Dragon (Quirinus)

Nicasius, Quirinus, Scubiculus, and Pientia were venerated as martyrs and saints. Their feast day is 11 October. Their historicity is uncertain, and "no trustworthy historical reports of [them] exist."

Nicasius has been identified with Nicasius of Rheims, and there are many saints with the name of Saint Quirinus.

== Legends ==
One legend states that they died in 285 AD and that Nicasius was one of the first missionaries sent from Rome to evangelize Gaul in the first century. Nicasius thus may have been a regionary bishop. Quirinus is stated to have been his priest while his deacon was Scubiculus (who is known as Egobille in France). According to the legend he was put to death, together with Nicasius, in the pagus Vulcassinus (Vexin).

One variant of the legend states that Quirinus, Nicasius, and the deacon Scubiculus were sent to Gaul by Pope Clement, accompanying Saint Denis there. At Vaux-sur-Seine, Quirinus fought and defeated a dragon, which had laid waste to the area and poisoned a well.

Quirinus and his companions were later imprisoned by soldiers of the emperor Domitian, and were then beheaded. The following night, the beheaded saints picked up their own heads and walked to an island on the river Epte, where they were buried by a lady named Pientia and a priest named Clarus.

== Veneration ==
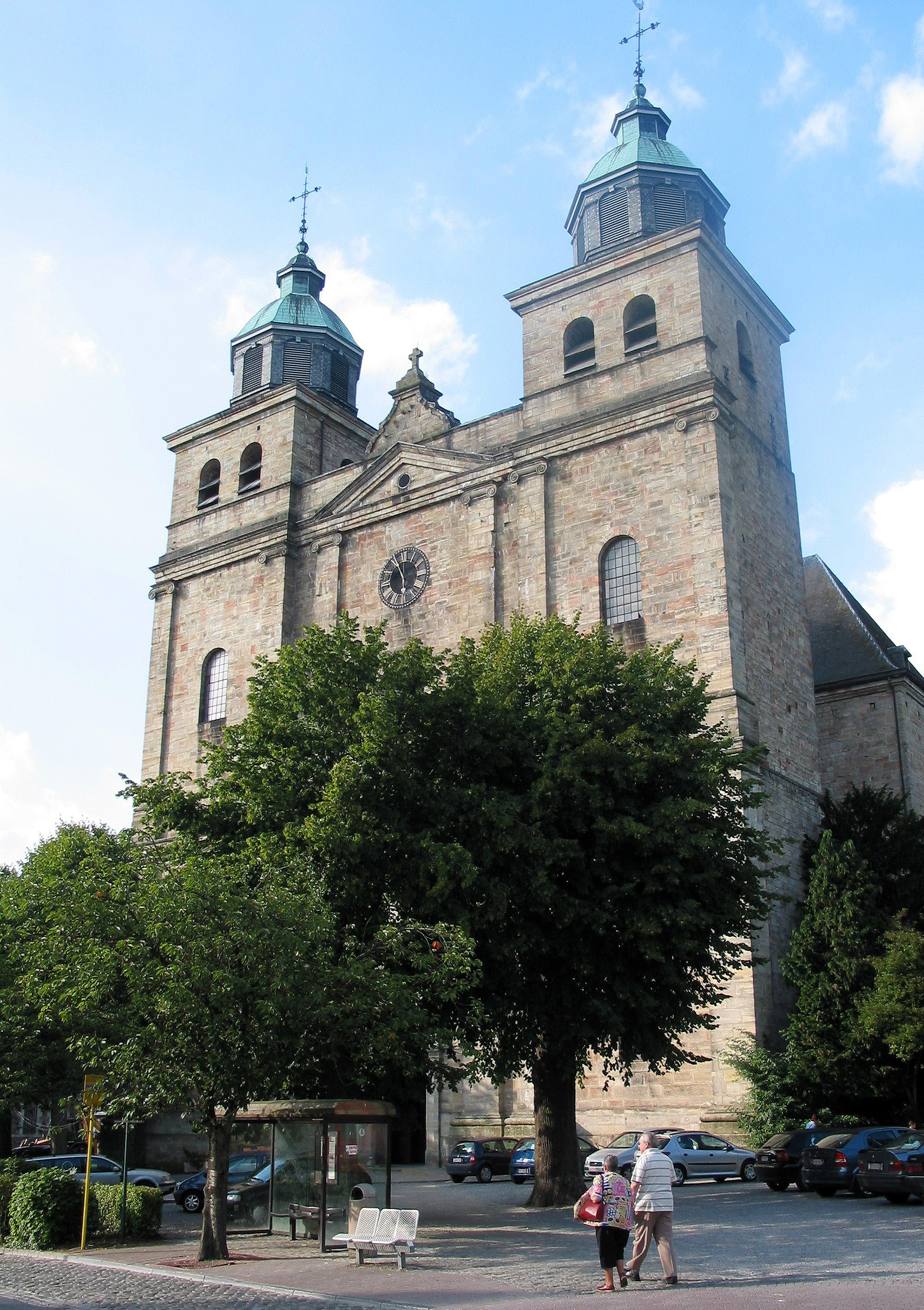
The Cathedral of Sts. Peter, Paul and Quirinus, Malmedy

Quirinus’ relics were translated around 875 to the abbey church of Malmedy during the reign of Charles the Bald, and Malmedy became the centre of his cult. Thus, he is sometimes venerated separately as St. Quirinus of Malmedy, and gained much more importance than his alleged companions Nicasius and Scubiculus. Quirinus' relics were officially confirmed as authentic by Abbot Poppo of Stavelot. They are contained inside a wooden ossuary chest at the foot of a statue on the left of the nave.

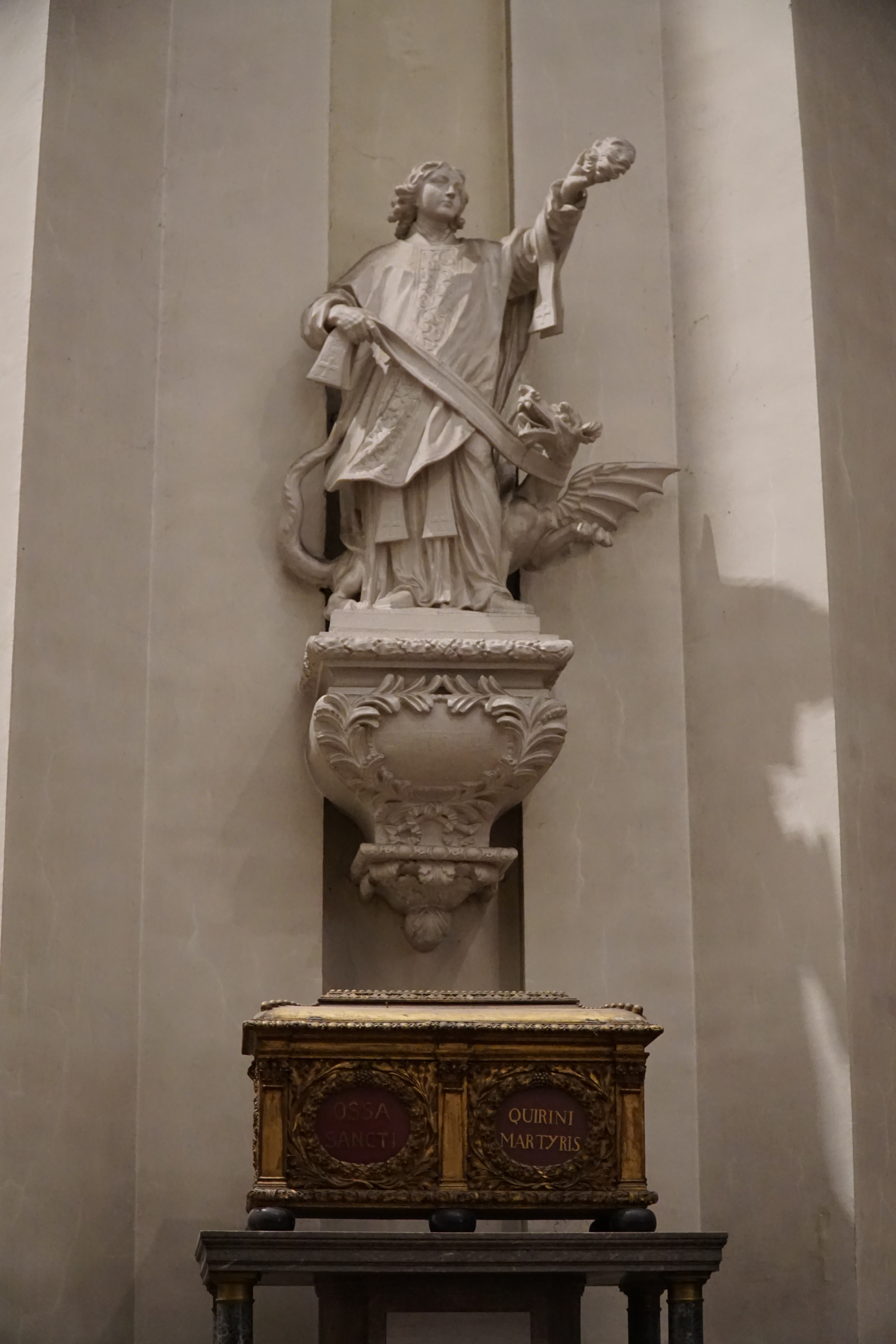
Malmedy (Belgium), Ossuary of Saint Quirin with statue inside Cathedral

Malmedy had been a branch of Stavelot, but between 1065 and 1071 became independent from this monastery. As a result, it needed as a strong heavenly intercessor as its patron saint in order to compete with Stavelot's: Saint Remaclus. Malmedy thus devised Quirinus’ legend, which was copied from other hagiographies and incorporating common tropes (fighting a dragon, cephalophoric elements, etc.), as well as elements from the lives of other saints of the same name.

Quirinus came to be invoked against drought, fever, bad weather, and demons, and farmers of the Münsterland invoked his aid against diseases affecting their cattle. Quirinus’ popularity is evidenced by the number of surnames in Central and Western Europe derived from his name, which include Quirini, Querings, Kehry, Kiry, Kuhrig, Koenrig, Crines, Krines, Krings, Kreugs, Cryns, Creins, Kreins, Krainz, Kircher, Kreine and Grein.
