= Nicodemus =

Pharisee, biblical figure appearing in the Gospel of John

Saint Nicodemus
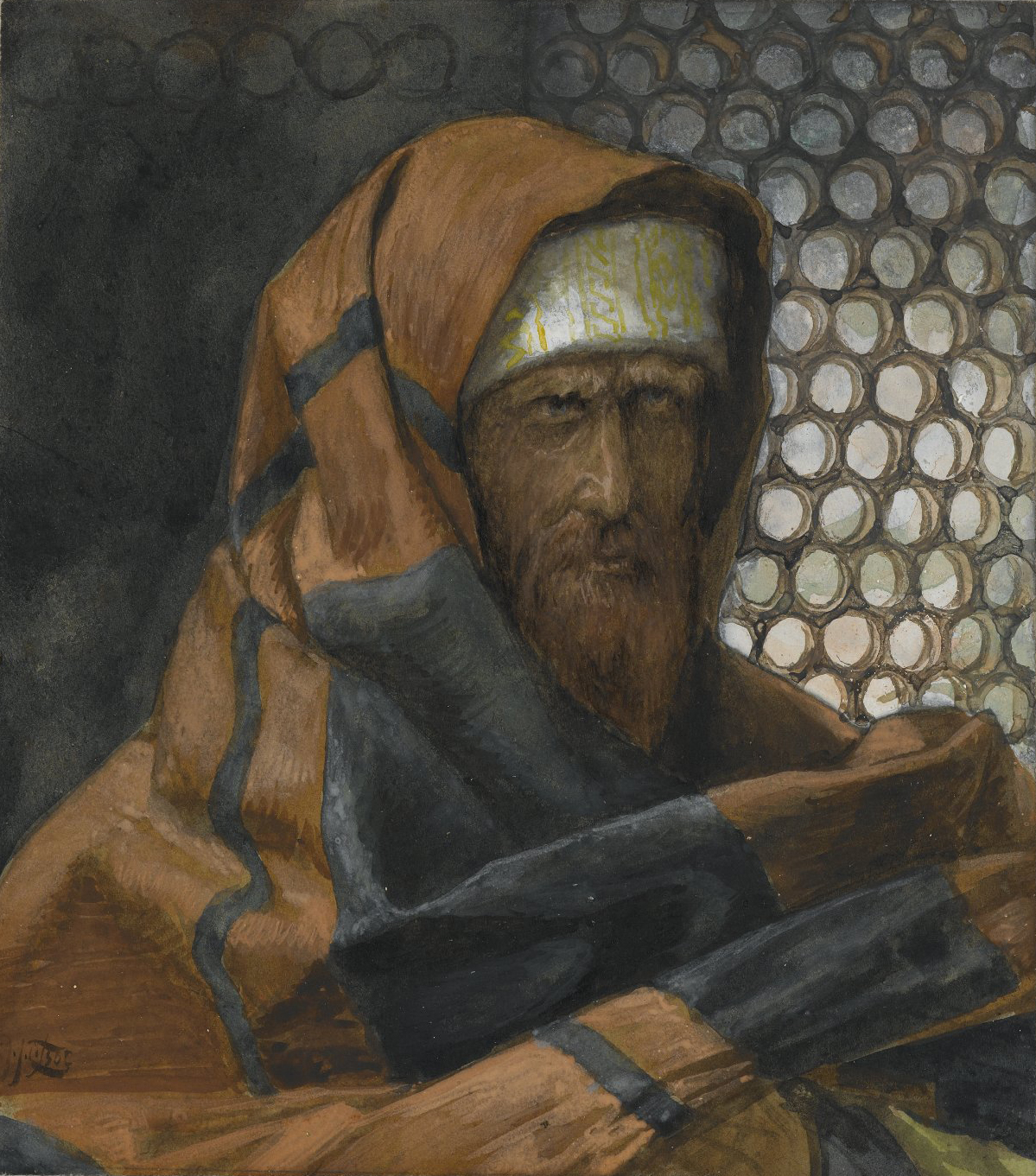
- Nicodemus by James Tissot, c. 1886 – c. 1894

Defender of Jesus
- Born: Galilee
- Died: Judea
- Venerated in: Anglicanism; Catholicism; Eastern Orthodoxy; Lutheranism; Oriental Orthodoxy
- Canonized: Pre-Congregation
- Feast: Various (see § Veneration): 3rd Sunday of Pascha, 2 August, 3 August, 31 August
- Attributes: Pharisee
- Patronage: Curiosity; Undertakers and pallbearers

Nicodemus (Note: Imperial Aramaic: 𐡍𐡒𐡃𐡉𐡌𐡅𐡍, romanized: Naqdīmūn; Hebrew: נַקְדִּימוֹן, romanized: Naqdīmōn; Ancient Greek: Νικόδημος, romanized: Nikódēmos; Ge'ez: ኒቆዲሞስ, romanized: Niqodimos) /nɪkəˈdiːməs/ is a New Testament figure venerated as a saint in a number of Christian traditions. He is depicted as a Pharisee and a member of the Sanhedrin who is drawn to hear Jesus's teachings. Like Lazarus, Nicodemus is not mentioned in the synoptic Gospels, but only by John, who devotes more than half of Chapter 3 of his gospel and a few verses of Chapter 7 to Nicodemus; and, lastly, mentions him in Chapter 19.

Nicodemus is considered in both Catholic and Eastern Orthodox traditions to have secretly been a disciple of Jesus on the basis of the narrative in John 19; there is no explicit mention of his discipleship in the Gospel of John. Owing to his insistence on a hearing for Jesus according to Jewish law, Nicodemus is sometimes called "defender of Jesus".

Some scholars have identified the Nicodemus of the New Testament with a 1st-century historic Nicodemus ben Gurion, while others consider the dates and apparent age discrepancy between the two make this unlikely. An apocryphal work under his name, the Gospel of Nicodemus, was produced in the mid-4th century, and is mostly a reworking of the earlier Acts of Pilate, which recounts the Harrowing of Hell.

== Gospel narrative ==
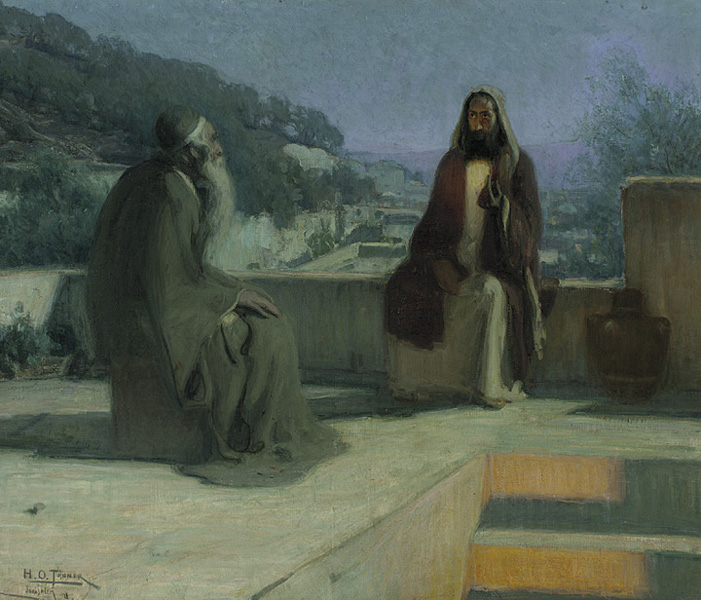
Nicodemus Visiting Christ, 1899 painting. Nicodemus (left) talking to Jesus, by Henry Ossawa Tanner

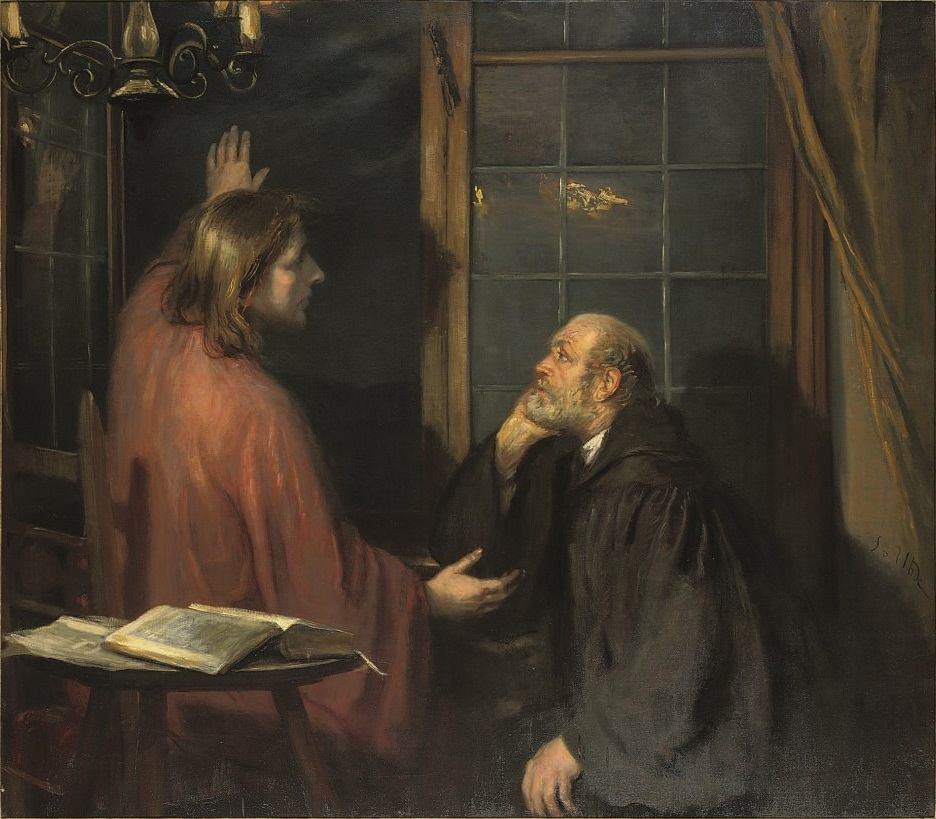
Christus und Nicodemus, by Fritz von Uhde (1848–1911)

Nicodemus is mentioned in three places in the Gospel of John:

- He first visits Jesus one night, in secret, to discuss Jesus's teachings. (John 3) (Note: John 3:1–21)
- The second time Nicodemus is mentioned, he reminds his colleagues in the Sanhedrin that the law requires that a person be heard before being judged. (John 7) (Note: John 7:50–51)
- Finally, Nicodemus appears after Jesus's crucifixion to provide the customary spices for anointing the dead, and assists Joseph of Arimathea in preparing the body of Jesus for burial. (John 19) (Note: John 19:39–42; Verse 40: "They took the body of Jesus and wrapped it with the spices in linen cloths, according to the burial custom of the Jews.")

The first time Nicodemus is mentioned, he is identified as a Pharisee who comes to see Jesus at night. According to the scripture, Jesus went to Jerusalem for the Passover feast. While in Jerusalem he chased the moneychangers from the temple and overturned their tables. His disciples remembered then the words of Psalm 69: "Zeal for your house will consume me." After these events "many believed in his name when they saw the signs that he was doing". (Note: John 2:23–25) When Nicodemus visits Jesus he makes reference to these events: "Rabbi, we know that you are a teacher who has come from God. For no one could perform the signs you are doing if God were not with him". (Note: John 3:2)

Jesus replies: "Unless one is born again he cannot see the kingdom of God." Then follows a conversation with Nicodemus about the meaning of being "born again" or "born from above" (Greek: ἄνωθεν): Nicodemus explores the notion of being literally born again from one's mother's womb, but most theologians recognise that Nicodemus knew Jesus was not speaking of literal rebirth. Theologian Charles Ellicott wrote that "after the method of Rabbinic dialogue, [Nicodemus] presses the impossible meaning of the words in order to exclude it, and to draw forth the true meaning. 'You cannot mean that a man is to enter the second time into his mother's womb, and be born. What is it, then, that you do mean?'" In this instance, Nicodemus chooses to first question with the literal (rather than the figurative) meaning of anōthen; this literal sense of the word can then be firmly set aside to allow the real significance of the term to emerge.

Jesus expresses surprise, perhaps ironically, that "a teacher of Israel" does not understand the concept of spiritual rebirth: (Note: John 3:10–11)

Jesus answered him, "Are you the teacher of Israel and yet you do not understand these things? Truly, truly, I say to you, we speak of what we know, and bear witness to what we have seen, but you do not receive our testimony."

— John 3:10–11

In Chapter 7, Nicodemus advises his colleagues among "the chief priests and the Pharisees", to hear and investigate before making a judgment concerning Jesus, reminding them that Jewish law requires that a person must be heard before they can be condemned. Their mocking response argues that no prophet comes from Galilee. Nonetheless, it is probable that he wielded a certain influence in the Sanhedrin.

Finally, when Jesus is buried, Nicodemus brought a mixture of myrrh and aloes—about 100 Roman pounds (33 kilograms, or 73 lb). (Note: John 19:39) Nicodemus must have been a man of means; in his book Jesus of Nazareth: Holy Week, Pope Benedict XVI observes that, "The quantity of the balm is extraordinary and exceeds all normal proportions. This is a royal burial."

== Interpretation ==
=== Coming by night ===
D. A. Carson observes that John gives no reason why Nicodemus came by night, and that the suggestions offered have ranged from a simple biographical reminiscence, to the practice of rabbis studying and debating late into the night, to a wish for the cover of darkness. Carson argues that the best clue lies in John's use of "night" elsewhere in the Gospel (John 9:4; John 11:10; John 13:30), where the word either stands for moral and spiritual darkness or, where it does refer to the hours of night, carries the same symbolism.

Craig S. Keener takes the detail on two levels. Within the story, Nicodemus comes at night to avoid being seen, remaining in solidarity with those who feared to confess Jesus so as not to be expelled from the synagogue (John 12:42). For John's audience the reference also works symbolically, bracketing the narrative between Nicodemus coming "by night" (John 3:2) and those who leave the darkness for the light (John 3:21), and so anticipating his part in the burial.

Kenneth E. Bailey compares the episode to the account of the Samaritan woman at the well that follows it, noting that in John the night scenes are the dark ones, with Nicodemus wavering, Judas going out into the night (John 13:30), and the arrest, the hearing before Annas and Peter's denial all taking place after dark, whereas the Samaritan woman comes at noon, hears, and believes.

== Historicity ==
Although there is no clear source of information about Nicodemus outside the Gospel of John, Ochser and Kohler, writing in The Jewish Encyclopedia in 1905, identify him with Nicodemus ben Gurion, mentioned in the Talmud as a wealthy and popular holy man reputed to have had miraculous powers. Some later 20th- and 21st-century historians make the same connection. Other scholars reject this identification, arguing that the biblical Nicodemus is likely an older man at the time of his conversation with Jesus, while Nicodemus ben Gurion was on the scene forty years later, at the time of the First Jewish-Roman War.

== Veneration ==
Nicodemus is venerated as a saint in Eastern Orthodoxy, Oriental Orthodoxy and in Catholicism. The Eastern Orthodox and Byzantine Catholic Churches commemorate him on the Sunday of the Holy Myrrhbearers, which is celebrated on the Third Sunday of Pascha (i.e., the second Sunday after Easter). Pious tradition holds that his relics were found on 2 August, along with those of Saint Stephen the Protomartyr; Gamaliel; and Gamaliel's second son, Abibon (also, "Abibas"; "Abibo"). This event is commemorated on that date in the Eastern churches, while the Catholic General Roman Calendar marks the anniversary of the translation of Nicodemus' remains, rather than their discovery, which by the same tradition occurred the following day, 3 August. In the Roman Martyrology, Nicodemus' feast day is 31 August, celebrated jointly with Saint Joseph of Arimathea, and generally followed in the Roman Rite tradition.

This does not preclude local preferences and traditions from being applied, as dioceses, national churches and religious institutes may have their own days of observance approved. For example, at the St. Nicodemus and St. Joseph of Arimathea Church, which the Franciscan Order established in Ramla in the 19th century, permission from the Latin Patriarch of Jerusalem was obtained to celebrate the feast day of the two saints on the Saturday of the third week of Easter, so that the link between their role in the burial of Jesus and Easter solemnities would be highlighted in the Holy Land. The church has a painting above its altar, attributed to Titian, The Deposition from the Cross, which shows the two saints.

=== Days of observance ===
- Eastern Christianity (including Eastern Orthodoxy, Oriental Orthodoxy and Eastern-rite Catholics):
  - Discovery of the saint's relics: 2 August
  - As a Holy Myrrhbearer: Third Sunday of Pascha (Easter)
- Roman-rite Catholicism:
  - Translation of the saint's relics: 3 August
  - Feast day: 31 August

== Legacy ==
=== Art ===
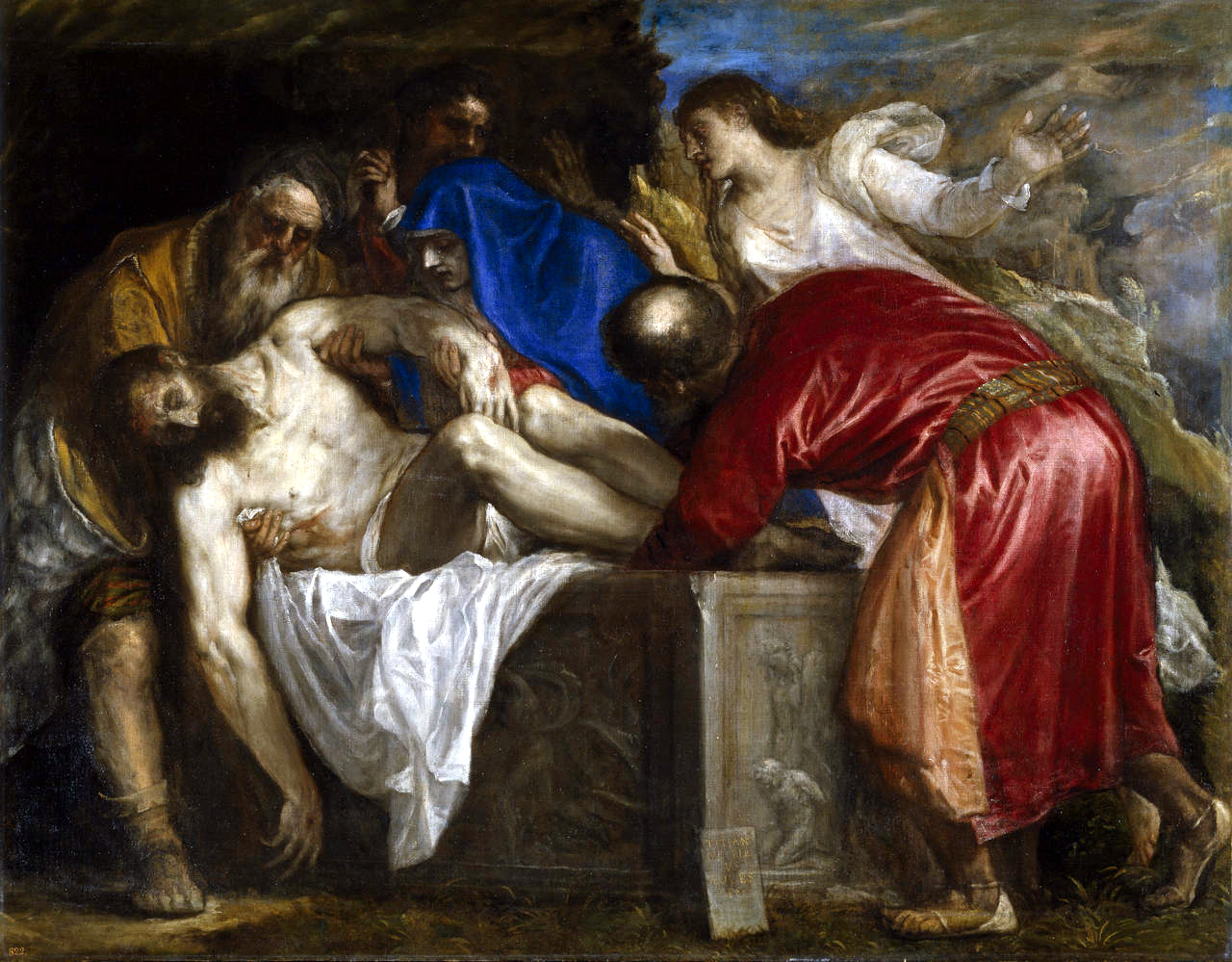
Entombment, by Titian

Nicodemus figures prominently in medieval depictions of the Deposition or Descent from the Cross in which he and Joseph of Arimathea are shown removing the dead Christ from the cross, often with the aid of a ladder.

Like Joseph, Nicodemus became the object of various pious legends during the Middle Ages, particularly in connection with monumental crosses. He was reputed to have carved both the Holy Face of Lucca and the Batlló Crucifix, receiving angelic assistance with the face in particular and thus rendering the works instances of acheiropoieta.

Both of these sculptures date from at least a millennium after Nicodemus's life, but the ascriptions attest to the contemporary interest in Nicodemus as a character in medieval Europe.

=== Literature ===
In Henry Vaughan's "The Night", Nicodemus is significant to the 17th-century poem's theme: He serves as the departure point and illustration of its meditation on night's relationship with experience of God.

Persuaded: The Story of Nicodemus by David Harder is a fictionalized account of the life of Nicodemus. According to the author, he used episodes and timetables sourced from all four gospels and the Acts of the Apostles to develop his novel's timeline of events. Scripture quoted within the novel is taken from the Passion Translation (Note: Passion Translation) version of the Bible.

=== Music ===
In 18th-century Lutheranism, prescribed readings were assigned throughout the year; the gospel text of the meeting of Jesus and Nicodemus at night was assigned to Trinity Sunday. Johann Sebastian Bach composed several cantatas for the occasion, of which O heilges Geist- und Wasserbad, BWV 165, composed in 1715, stays close to the gospel based on a libretto by the court poet in Weimar, Salomo Franck.

In popular music, Nicodemus's name was used figuratively in Henry Clay Work's 1864 American Civil War-era piece "Wake Nicodemus!", an abolitionist song hailing the end of slavery, which at that time was popular in minstrel shows. In 1978 Tim Curry covered the song on his debut album Read My Lips. The song's layered connotations, its anti-slavery sentiment—gave it a connection with "rebirths", and to John's "born again" Nicodemus. By extension, it became associated with the civil rights movement in the § United States.

Ernst Pepping composed an Evangelienmotette (motet on gospel text) Jesus und Nikodemus in 1937. In 1941, The Golden Gate Quartet, sang the Gospel "God Told Nicodemus", in the African-American Jubilee style. The Bob Dylan song "In The Garden", released on the 1980 album Saved, contains the lines "Nicodemus came at night so he wouldn't be seen by men / Saying, 'Master, tell me why a man must be born again'". The song "Help Yourself" by The Devil Makes Three, from their 2009 Do Wrong Right album, contains a very informal retelling of the relationship between Nicodemus and Jesus.

=== Film and television ===
Nicodemus is portrayed by Diego Matamoros in the 2003 film The Gospel of John. In the 2025 animated film, Light of the World, Michael Benyaer voices Nicodemus.

The figure of Nicodemus appears in several television productions:

- In the 1952 series, The Living Bible, Forrest Taylor appears in the role of Nicodemus
- In the 1965 film, The Greatest Story Ever Told, Joseph Schildkraut plays the character of Nicodemus
- Sir Laurence Olivier portrayed Nicodemus in Franco Zeffirelli's 1977 series, Jesus of Nazareth
- Erick Avari plays Nicodemus in the 2019 web series The Chosen
- In the 2018–2019 Brazilian television series Jesus, actor Ernani Moraes depicts Nicodemus

== Social influence ==
=== The Reformation and religious conflict ===
During the struggle between Protestants and Catholics in Europe, from the 16th century to the 18th, a person professing a creed different from the locally approved one often risked severe penalties—in many cases, capital punishment. There developed the use of "Nicodemite", usually a term of disparagement, referring to a person who is suspected of public misrepresentation of their actual religious beliefs. The term is recorded from at least 1529, in relation to religious concealment or reticence. It is a reference to the clandestine night visit of Nicodemus to Jesus, suggesting an analogy between the undeclared belief of Nicodemus and the reluctance of some dissenters from (at first) Catholicism to risk being open about their true creed. To John Calvin, who opposed all veneration of saints, the fact of Nicodemus being a Catholic saint in no way exonerated this "duplicity". Calvin used the word in his 1544 Excuse à messieurs les Nicodemites referring to religious dissemblers in France—outwardly, conforming Catholics; inwardly, adherents of Protestantism. He was apparently not completely comfortable with the term's allusion to Nicodemus, however; subsequent editions of the work reduced the label's use and later French editions replaced the word with "faux ('false') Nicodemus" instead. While the epithet initially applied to crypto-Protestants, it later came to be used broadly for anyone suspected of exhibiting a false appearance of their religious adherence and concealing their genuine beliefs.

=== United States ===
The discussion with Jesus is the source of several common expressions of contemporary American Christianity, specifically, the descriptive phrase "born again" used to describe salvation or baptism by some groups, and John 3:16, a commonly quoted verse used to describe God's plan of salvation.

The Nicodemus National Historic Site, commemorating the only remaining western town established by African Americans during the Reconstruction Period following the American Civil War, is in Kansas. The National Park Service indicates the town's name came from the 1864 piece, "Wake Nicodemus" by Henry Clay Work. Some point to the lyrics' use of the name Nicodemus as a figurative reference to the biblical figure. In the case of the song, Nicodemus is an enslaved African, long deceased, but acknowledged in the lyrics as both prophet and herald of freedom. The contrast in the lyrics between night and morning, and the enslaved Nicodemus' certainty in what the metaphorical "morning" would bring, have been seen as drawing a parallel to, and being inspired by, the story of the biblical figure. In one story, emancipation, and in the other, salvation, is to come "in the morning"; each Nicodemus has faith in their eventual advent. The lyrics say, in part:

First verse:
Nicodemus, the slave, was of African birth,
And was bought for a bagful of gold; [...]
But he died years ago, very old. [...]
"Wake me up!" was his charge,
at the first break of day–
Wake me up for the great Jubilee!

Chorus:
The "Good Coming" is almost here!
It was long, long, long on the way!
Now run and tell Elijah to hurry up, Pomp
And meet up at the gum tree down in the swamp,
To wake Nicodemus today.

Fourth verse:
'Twas a long weary night – we were almost in fear
That the future was more than he knew;
'Twas a long weary night – but the morning is near,
And the words of our prophet are true. ...

— Extract from "Wake Nicodemus" by Henry Clay Work (1864)

Rosamund Rodman, a researcher and scholar of placenames, noted in a 2008 article that slaves who learnt to read generally did so in secret and at night, due to risks of punishment for this forbidden activity. The gospel's Nicodemus came to Jesus to learn from him, also in secret and at night, for fear of repercussions. Such connections and allusions lead Rodman to conclude that the town's name has its ultimate origin with the biblical figure. Religious affairs journalist Daniel Burke notes that, "To blacks after the Civil War, he was a model of rebirth as they sought to cast off their old identity as slaves".

On 16 August 1967, Martin Luther King Jr. invoked Nicodemus as a metaphor concerning the need for the United States to be "born again" in order to effectively address social and economic inequality. The speech, called "Where Do We Go From Here?", was delivered at the 11th Annual Southern Christian Leadership Conference (SCLC) Convention in Atlanta, Georgia.

== Gallery ==
Nicodemus in art

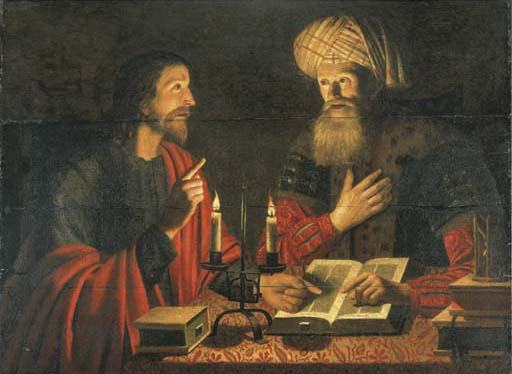
Jesus and Nicodemus, by Crijn Hendricksz

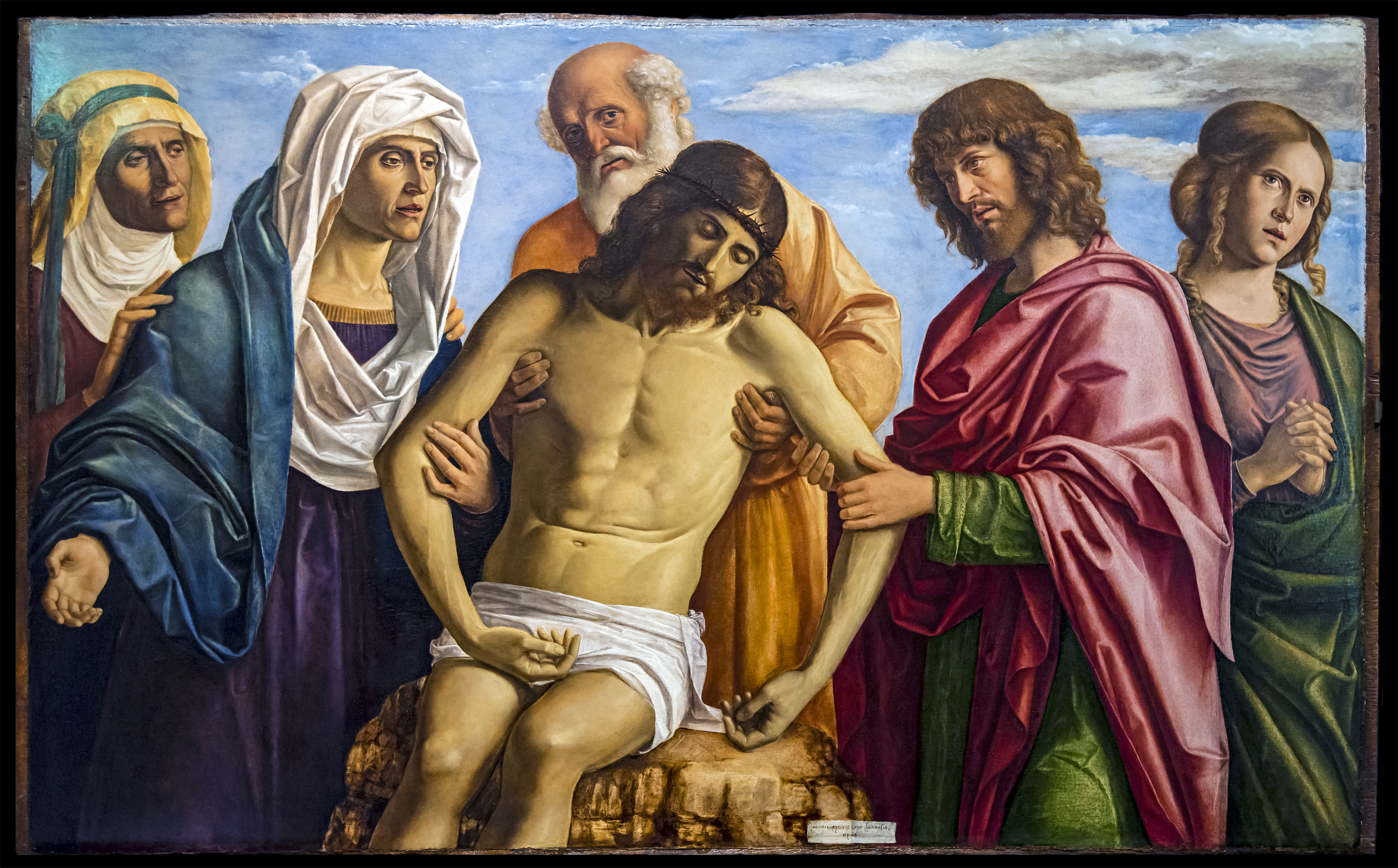
Nicodemus with Christ's body, by Cima da Conegliano, with Apostle John on the right and Mary to left.

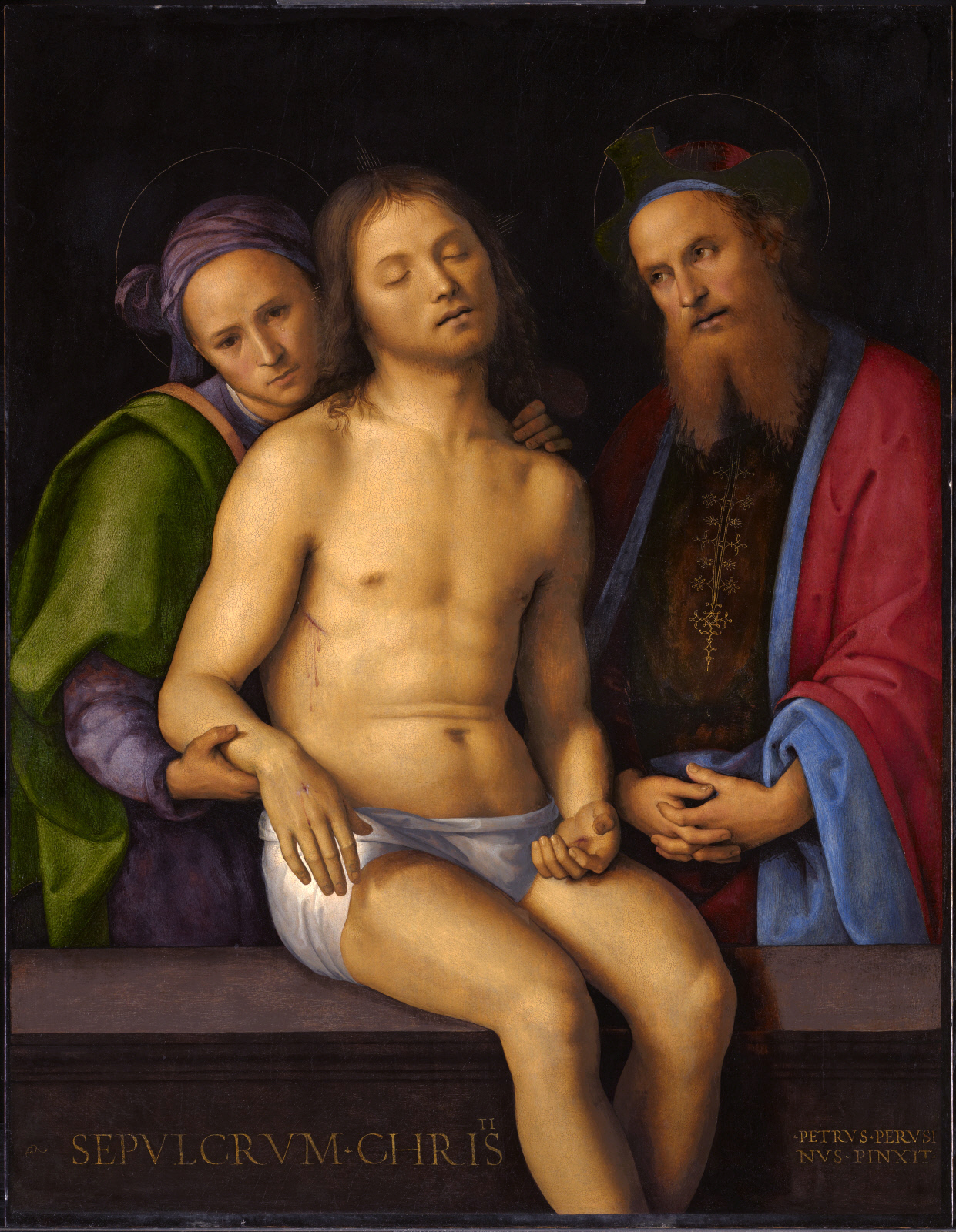
Entombment, by Pietro Perugino, with Nicodemus and Joseph of Arimatea

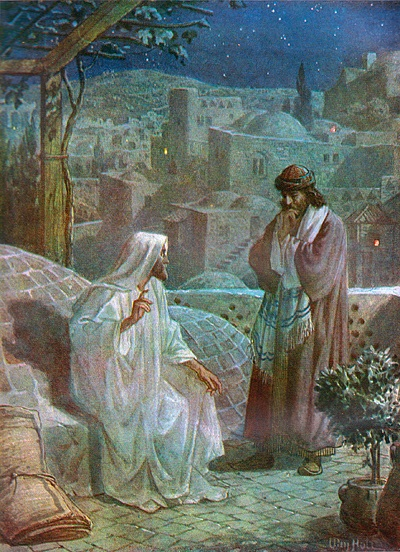
Nicodemus (right) talking to Jesus, by William Brassey Hole

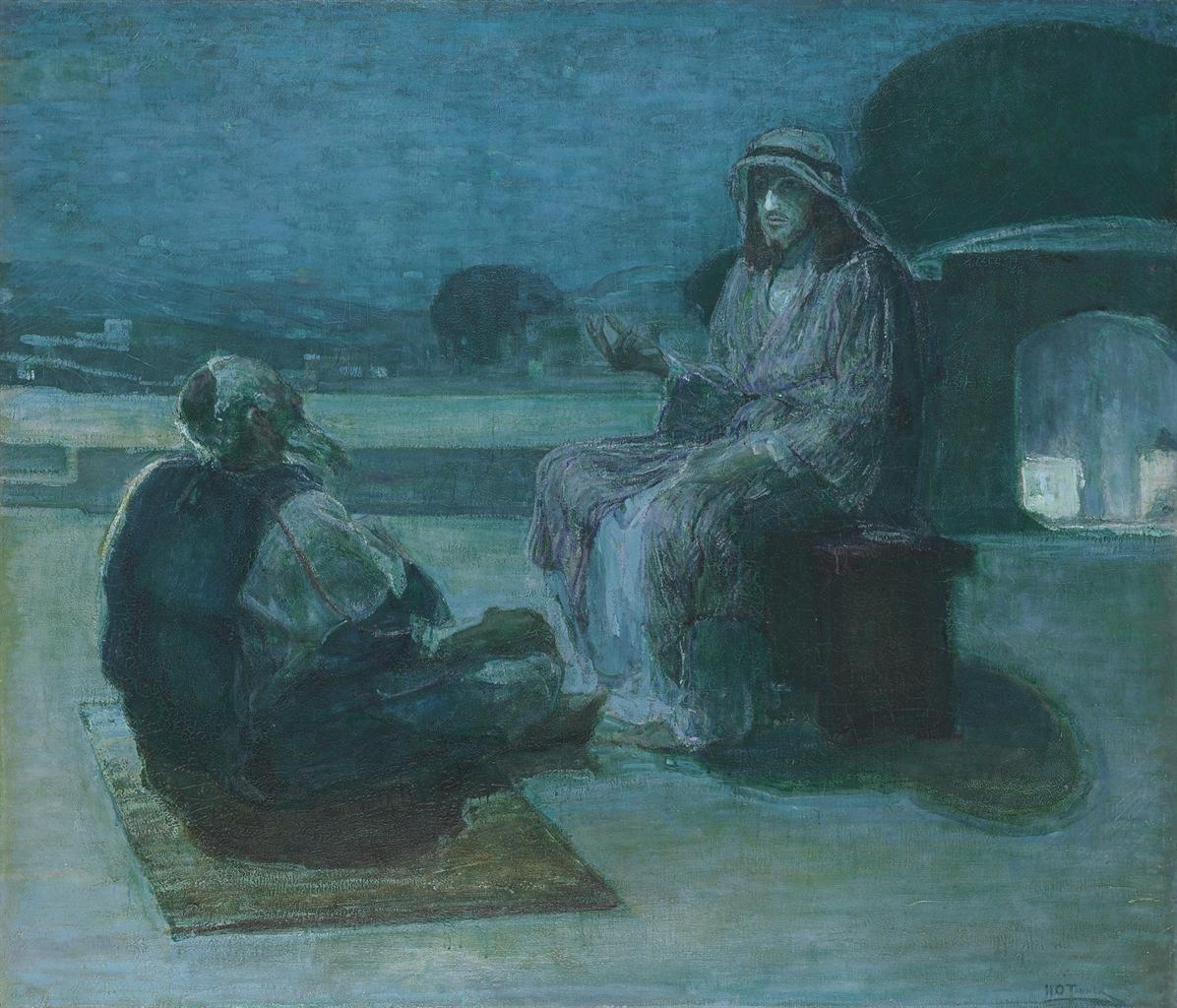
Nicodemus coming to Christ, by Henry Ossawa Tanner

== See also ==
- Saint Nicodemus, patron saint archive
- Christ's discourse with Nicodemus
- Chapel of Saint Joseph of Arimathea and Saint Nicodemus, the Syrian Orthodox chapel within the Church of the Holy Sepulchre, Jerusalem

== Notes ==
Nicodemus Life of Jesus
Preceded by Temple Cleansing	New Testament Events	Succeeded by Samaritan Woman at the Well
