= Quirijn =

Quirijn is a Dutch masculine given name. It is a form of Quirinus. The name Quirinus became popular in the Low Countries due to the veneration of Saint Quirinus of Neuss. The name took many different forms from the 15th century on: Corijn, Crijn, Krijn, Quirijn and Quiringh. Among female versions are Krijntje and Quirine. People with these names include:

Quirijn

- Quirijn Boel (1620–1668), Flemish engraver
- Quirijn van Brekelenkam (c.1625–c.1670), Dutch genre painter
- Quirijn Jansz Damast (1580–1638), Dutch linen weaver and mayor of Haarlem
- Quirijn Gunning (born 1991), Dutch cricketer
- Quirijn Maurits Rudolph Ver Huell (1787–1860), Dutch navy officer, writer, painter and entomologist

Crijn / Krijn

- Krijn, name given to a Neanderthal man, whose fossil was discovered off the Dutch coast
- Krijn ter Braak (born 1941), Dutch actor and television director
- Krijn Breur (1917–1943), Dutch resistance fighter in World War II
- Crijn Fredericks, chief engineer of the New Netherland colony in 1625 and 1626
- Crijn Hendricksz Volmarijn (1601–1645), Dutch painter
- Krijn Torringa (1940–2006), Dutch radio presenter

Quirine

- Quirine Lemoine (born 1991), Dutch tennis player
- Quirine Oosterveld (born 1990), Dutch volleyball player
- Quirine Viersen (born 1972), Dutch cellist
