= Christ's discourse with Nicodemus =

Nicodemus' discourse with Jesus at Night

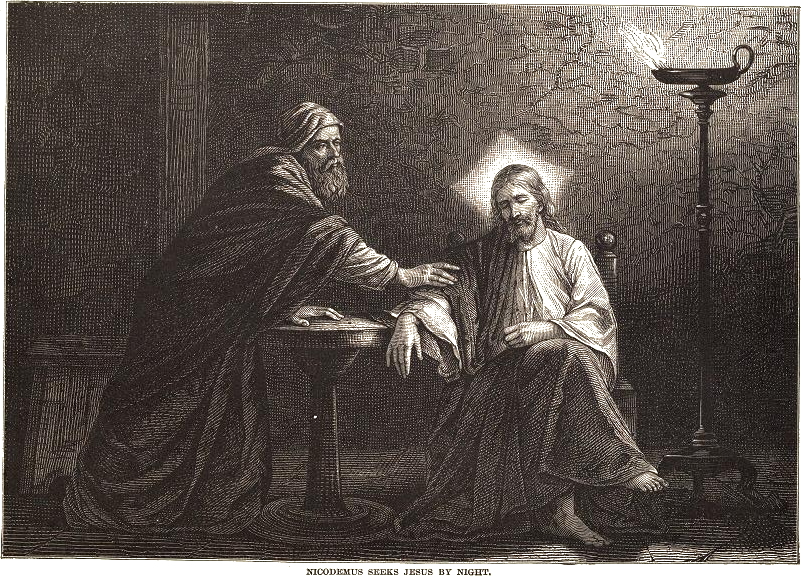
Nicodemus seeks Jesus by night by Alexandre Bida (1875)

Jesus' discourse with Nicodemus is related in John 3:1–21, but not in the synoptic gospels. For fear of the Jewish authorities a ruler in Israel, Nicodemus, one of the Pharisees, comes by night to see Jesus. Jesus explains to him that to enter the Kingdom of God, he must be born again of water and of the Spirit. These words are thought to refer to the Sacrament of Baptism.

== Narrative ==
Now there was a man of the Pharisees named Nicodemus, a ruler of the Jews. This man came to Jesus by night because he was afraid of being seen with him in daylight and said to him, “Rabbi, we know that you are a teacher who has come from God, for no one can do these signs that you do unless God is with him.” Jesus answered him, “Truly, truly, I say to you, unless one is born again he cannot see the kingdom of God.” Nicodemus asked, “How can a man be born when he is old? Can he enter a second time into his mother’s womb and be born?” Jesus answered, “Truly, truly, I say to you, unless one is born of water and the Spirit, he cannot enter the kingdom of God. That which is born of the flesh is flesh, and that which is born of the Spirit is spirit. Do not marvel that I said to you, ‘You must be born again.’ The wind blows where it wishes, and you hear its sound, but you do not know where it comes from or goes. So it is with everyone who is born of the Spirit.”

— John 3:1-8, English Standard Version

== Context ==
Nicodemus is thought to have been one of about 6,000 Pharisees at the time. Jesus was not well regarded by the Pharisees or Sanhedrin. Any meetings with Jesus would have jeopardized a Pharisee's position and reputation, and so this may have the reason for him coming by night.

This new birth that Jesus speaks of is thought to allude to Hosea 2:1, “Ye shall be called the sons of the living God.”

The wind is compared to the Holy Spirit in verse 8 of the discourse. This may be compared to Acts 2, when the Holy Spirit came down upon the Apostles as "a rushing mighty wind".

Nicodemus is mentioned again in John 7:50 and 19:39. The latter reference mentions the occasion in John 3 when Nicodemus met with Jesus.

== Commentary ==
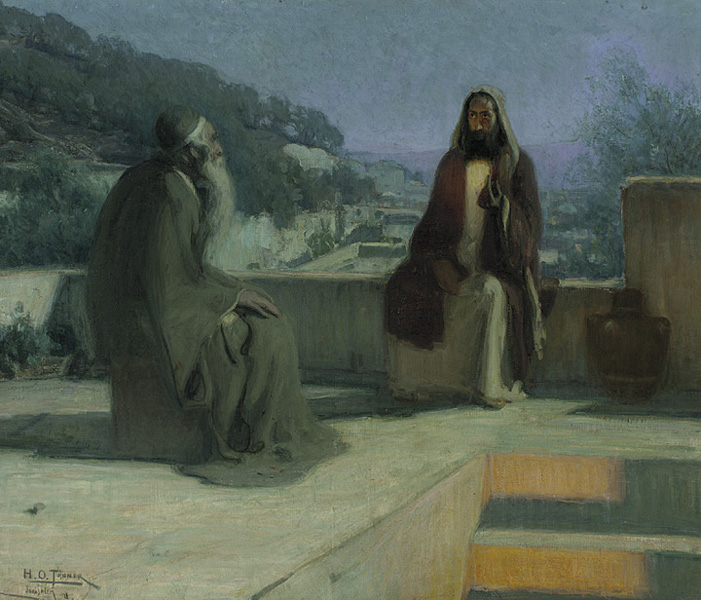
Nicodemus (left) talking to Jesus. Painting (1899) by Henry Ossawa Tanner.

Roger Baxter, in his Meditations, reflects on moral quality of Nicodemus' timidity:

Nicodemus being a man of high character, among his fellow citizens, and afraid of the censures of the world, came during the night, for instructions to Christ. He came in this private manner, "for fear of the Jews", for his mind probably revolted at the idea of appearing among the unlettered and poor disciples of the Man-God. How many thousands have lost their immortal souls by indulging this feeling! How many at this moment indulge it! Do not imitate their example, but say with St Paul, "I am not ashamed of the Gospel". (Rom. 1:16) Confess God both confidently, and openly, for Christ says: "Whosoever shall be ashamed of Me, and of My words, of him shall the Son of man be ashamed, when He shall come in His majesty." (Luke 9:26)

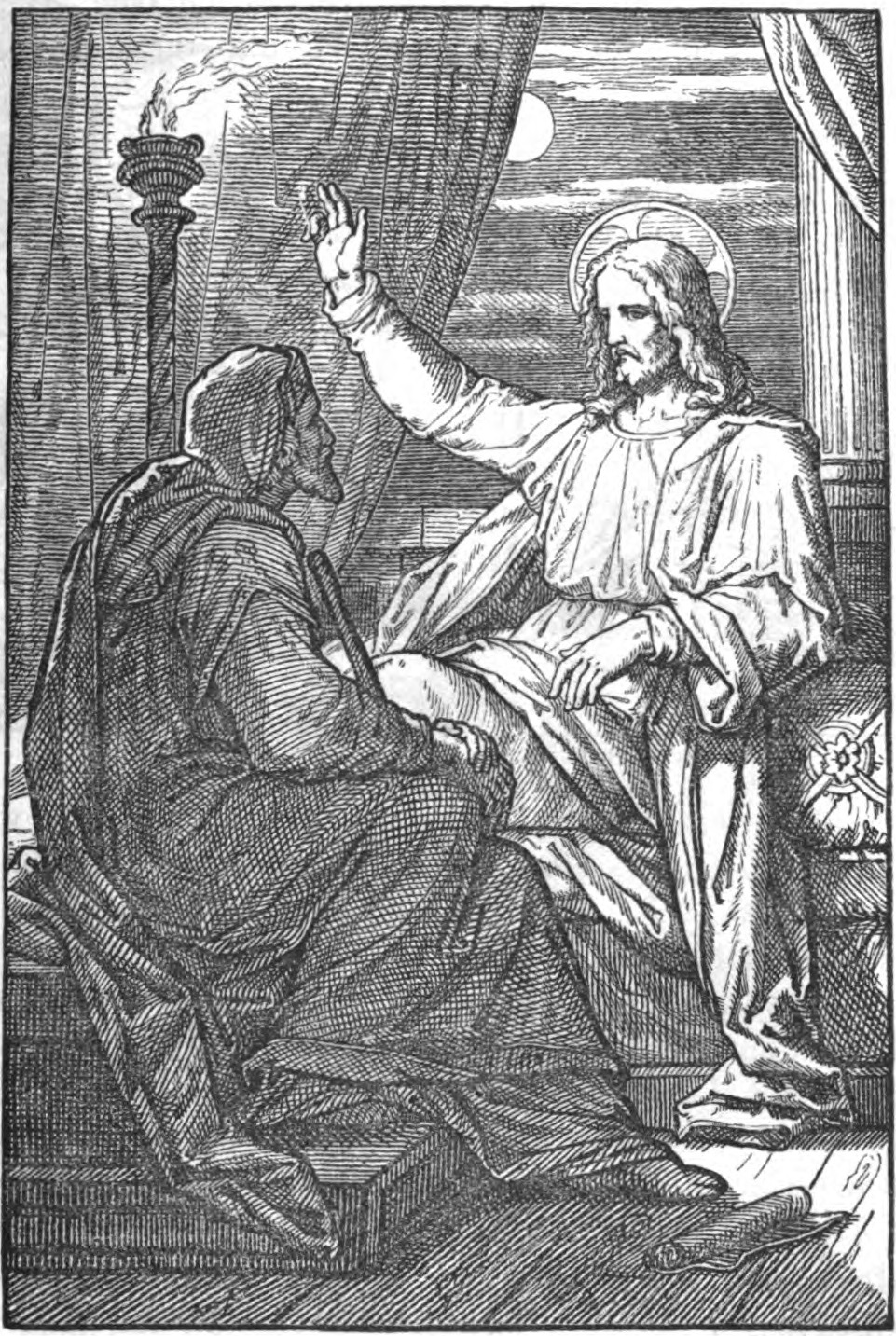
Nicodemus comes to Jesus by night. (1873)

German theologian Justus Knecht highlights two doctrinal points that come from this narrative:

1. The necessity of Baptism. Only he who is born again of water and of the Holy Ghost has any part in the kingdom of God. By Baptism man becomes a member of God’s kingdom upon earth, i.e. the Church of Jesus Christ, and an heir of God’s kingdom in heaven. Thus Baptism is absolutely necessary to salvation.

2. Original sin. The words of our Lord testify to the existence of original sin. They suppose that by our natural birth we have not that spiritual divine life in our soul which was given to our first parents in Paradise, and consequently that we have lost the principle of that life, sanctifying grace and all that was connected with it. We are born (spiritually) dead. This is the sin of our origin from Adam.

Australian pastor Paul Francis Porta presents a distinct view from that which identifies "being born of water" with baptism:

Jesus said to Nicodemus: “[...] unless one is born of water and the Spirit, he cannot enter the kingdom of God.” What does this mean? What did Nicodemus understand by “of water and the Spirit”? I don’t believe he understood these words as a reference to the rite of Christian baptism. Jesus did not intend to speak to him about something that could only be practiced after his death and resurrection. Furthermore, baptism was considered a testimony of salvation, not a means of salvation. There is a possibility that Nicodemus thought Jesus was referring to the baptismal rite of John the Baptist and repentance. However, there was another meaning that would have been more apparent to Nicodemus. Nicodemus was one of the Jewish leaders and, therefore, was well-versed in the teachings of the Old Testament. When Jesus mentioned water and the Spirit in the same expression, Nicodemus must have recalled the use of water in the Old Testament as a symbol of the Holy Spirit. Water was frequently used in the Old Testament to refer to the promise of a future outpouring of the Holy Spirit (Isaiah 32:15; 44:3-5; 55:1-3; Jeremiah 2:13; 17:13; Ezekiel 36:25-27; 39:29; Joel 2:28). Jesus continued the same symbolism in his teaching about the Holy Spirit. He said to the Samaritan woman: “[…] whoever drinks the water I give them will never thirst. Indeed, the water I give them will become in them a spring of water welling up to eternal life” (John 4:14). At the Feast of Tabernacles, Jesus promised: “Whoever believes in me, as Scripture has said, rivers of living water will flow from within them” (John 7:38). What was this river of living water? John's own comment regarding this promise leaves us with no doubt as to what Jesus meant: “And this he said of the Spirit [...]” (v. 39). Based on the Bible, we believe that Nicodemus must have applied Jesus' words (being born of water and the Spirit) to a personal experience of spiritual purification ministered by the Spirit of God.

== See also ==
- Life of Jesus in the New Testament
- Ministry of Jesus
- Nicodemus
- John 3:16
