= Pieter Nijs =

Dutch Golden Age painter

- Born: April 15, 1624; Amsterdam
- Died: June 16, 1681 (aged 57); Amsterdam
- Known for: Dutch painter

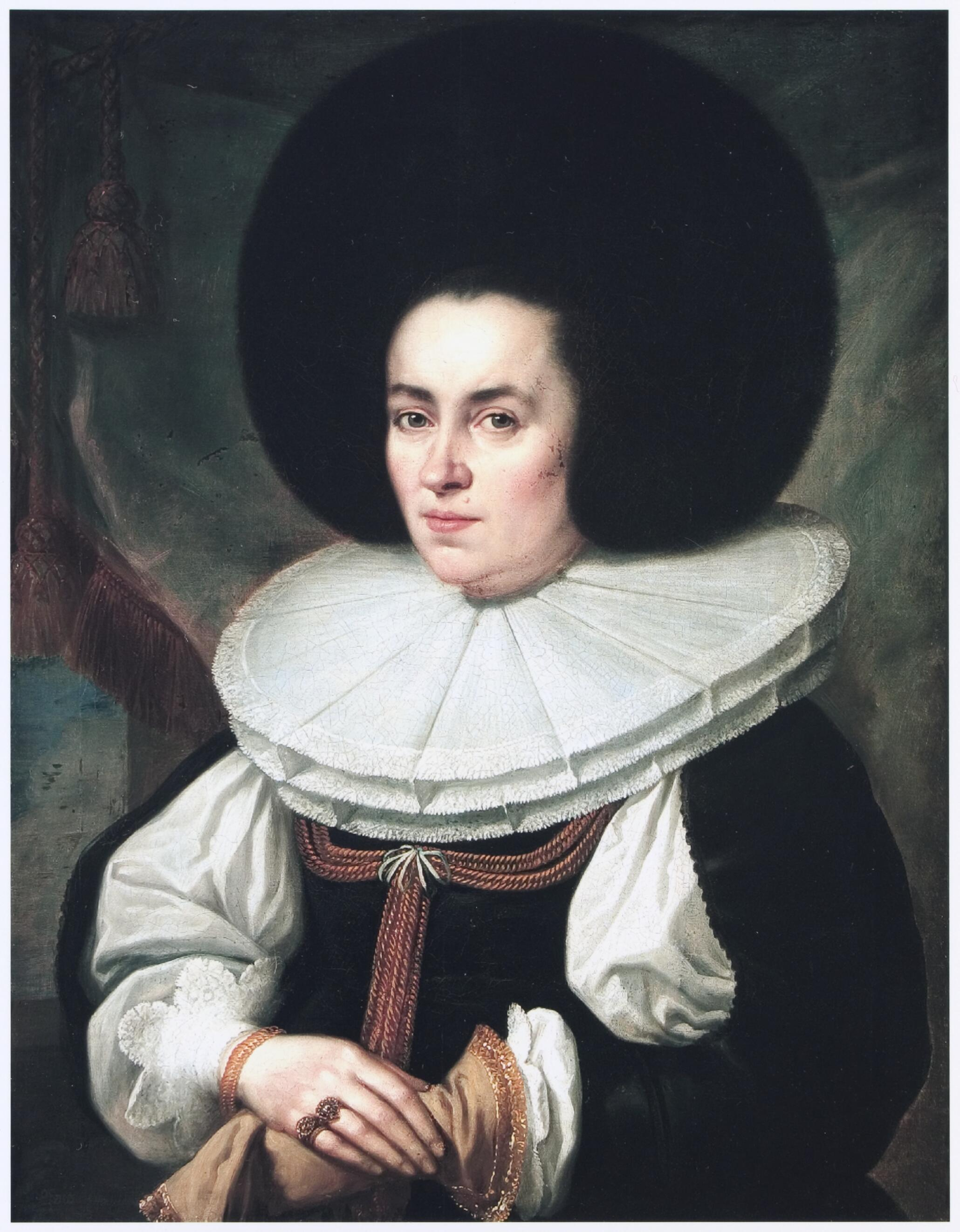
Portrait of a lady in South-German costume with boxed ruff collar and brämikappe, signed and dated 1654

Pieter Nijs or Nys (April 15, 1624 – June 16, 1681), was a Dutch Golden Age painter. Nijs was born in Amsterdam. According to the RKD he was a pupil of Hendrik Martensz Sorgh. Besides in Amsterdam, he worked in Rotterdam, Leuven and Antwerp and various towns in Germany. He is known for genre works, farm scenes, and portraits.

Nijs died in Amsterdam.
