= Crijn Hendricksz Volmarijn =

Dutch Golden Age painter

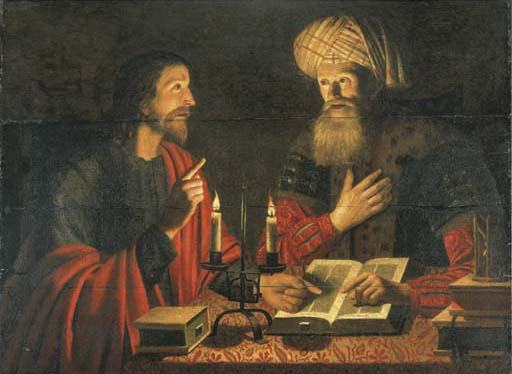
Jesus and Nicodemus, by Crijn Hendricksz Volmarijn

Crijn Hendricksz Volmarijn (1601 in Rotterdam – 1645 in Rotterdam) was a Dutch Golden Age painter.

== Biography ==
According to the RKD, he was a follower of Caravaggio known for his historical allegories. He was probably related to Pieter Crijnse Volmarijn, who became a pupil of his friend Hendrik Martenszoon Sorgh.
