= Quirinus of Tivoli =

Roman Catholic martyr and saint

Martyr
- Venerated in: Roman Catholic Church
- Feast: June 4

Saint Quirinus of Tivoli is venerated as a martyr and saint of the Catholic Church. His cult is centered at Tivoli. Quirinus of Tivoli may be the same saint as Quirinus of Sescia, whose relics were carried from Pannonia to Rome, and perhaps Tivoli as well, explaining the existence of a cult to Saint Quirinus of Tivoli. According to this interpretation, Quirinus of Sescia relics were reportedly moved to Apennine Peninsula during the invasion of the Huns.

According to the Johann Peter Kirsch, "there is no historical account of him; he is, perhaps, identical with one of the martyrs of this name who are mentioned in the Martyrology of Jerome among groups of martyrs under the dates of March 12, 3 and June 4. Under June 4, a Quirinus is mentioned with a statement of the place 'Nividuno civitate'." The Bibliotheca Sanctorum states that Quirinus of Tivoli's relics rested at the basilica of San Lorenzo in Tivoli, but nothing else about him is known. Cesare Baronio inserted his name into the Roman Martyrology under June 4.
