= Quirinus of Sescia =

Roman bishop

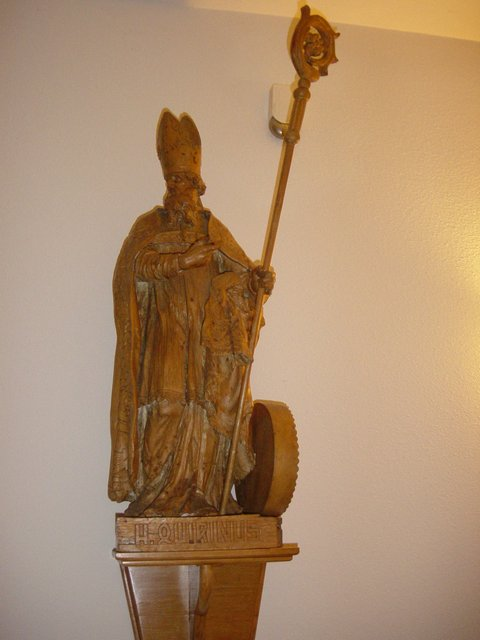
- Statue in Halsteren, Netherlands

Bishop and martyr
- Died: 309 AD; Sabaria, Pannonia, Roman Empire
- Venerated in: Roman Catholic Church, True Orthodox Church, Orthodox Church
- Canonized: Pre-Congregation
- Major shrine: Basilica of San Sebastiano fuori le mura, Rome, Italy
- Feast: 4 June
- Attributes: millstone hanging from his neck
- Patronage: Sisak

Quirinus (died 309 AD) is venerated as an early bishop of Sescia, now Sisak in Croatia. He is mentioned by Eusebius of Caesarea.

A Passio, considered unreliable, states that Quirinus was killed during the persecutions of Diocletian after being arrested in 309. Quirinus had attempted to flee but was imprisoned. He managed to convert his jailer, named Marcellus, to Christianity. After three days, the governor of Pannonia Prima, Amantius, ordered him taken to Sabaria (present-day Szombathely, Hungary), where after attempting to make Quirinus abjure his faith, he had the bishop thrown into the local Gyöngyös River with a millstone around his neck.

A variant of the legend states that he was almost killed during Diocletian's persecution of Christians: the authorities tied him to a millstone and threw him into a river, but he freed himself from the weight, escaped and continued to preach his faith. Saint Florian, another saint associated with Pannonia, was also said to have been executed by drowning with a stone tied around his neck. The Acts of the martyrdom of the saint were collected in (Thierry Ruinart, "Acta martyrum", Ratisbon, 522), and a hymn was written in his honour by Prudentius (loc. cit., 524).

== Veneration ==
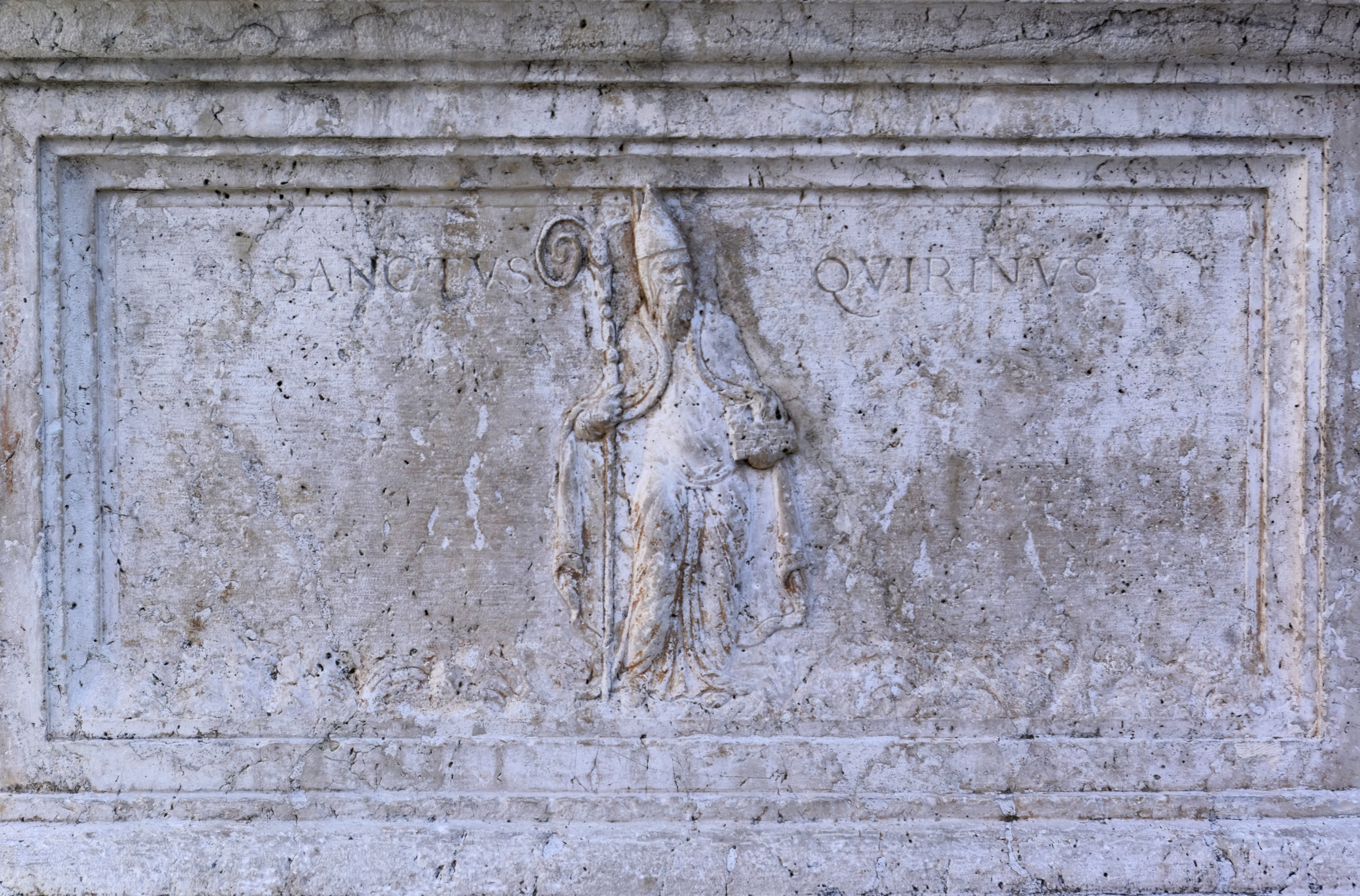
The main well at Krk depicts Saint Quirinus

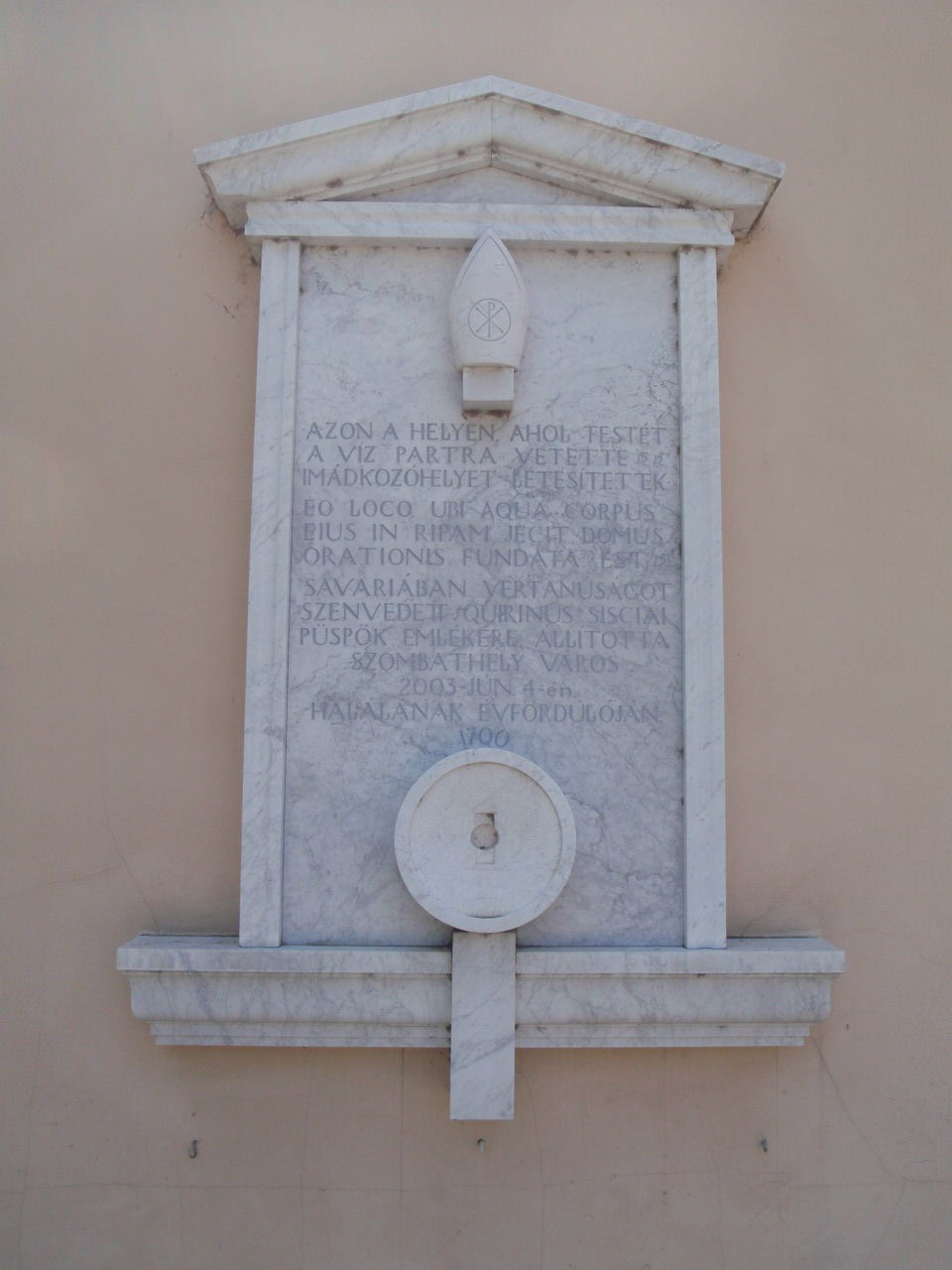
Szombathely Óperint Street - Plaque of the death of the 1700th anniversary

Local Christians of Savaria recovered his body and buried it near the gate known as the "Scarabateus" (likely at Sopron).

Upon the incursion of the barbarians into Pannonia at the end of the fourth century and at the beginning of the fifth, his relics were taken to Rome and deposited in a mausoleum or vaulted chamber named Platonia, behind the apse of the Basilica of San Sebastiano fuori le mura on the Appian Way.

The "Platonia" was a construction at the rear of the basilica; it was long believed to have been the temporary tomb for Peter and Paul, but was a tomb for Quirinus.

His cult became popular, as attested by the Itineraries of the 7th century. Some sources state that his relics were translated to various locations, including Correggio, Emilia-Romagna, Milan, Aquileia, and the Basilica of Santa Maria in Trastevere in Rome. His relics may have also been carried to Tivoli. There is a cult of Saint Quirinus of Tivoli, who may or may not be the same saint. The relics in Tivoli were reportedly moved to Apennine Peninsula during the invasion of the Huns.

Quirinus became considered one of the national protectors of the Republic of San Marino after a dense fog attributed to him by the Sammarinese on his feast day of June 4, 1543, thwarted an attempted conquest of the country by Fabiano di Monte San Savino, nephew of the later Pope Julius III. The Franciscan Capuchin Church of San Quirino was subsequently built in the capital of San Marino around 1550.

Quirinus (Croatian: Kvirin) is the patron saint of the present-day Diocese of Sisak.

A church is dedicated to him at Jesenovik, Croatia. His feast is observed on 4 June.
