= Missa Dona nobis pacem =

Missa
- Dona nobis pacem
- by Ernst Pepping
- English: Mass Grant us peace
- Genre: Mass
- Text: Order of Mass
- Language: Latin
- Performed: 17 November 1948
- Published: 1949
- Duration: 35 minutes
- Movements: 5
- Scoring: für Chor, two choirs SATB

The Missa Dona nobis pacem (Mass Grant us peace) is a setting of the Latin Order of Mass by the Lutheran composer Ernst Pepping for unaccompanied choir (für Chor). The voices are divided from four-part choir SATB to two four-part choirs. Composed in 1948, the work was published by Bärenreiter in 1949.

== Background ==
Pepping was a composer who relied on Baroque models but first wrote severe works with "uncompromising dissonance". An able teacher with ties to the Confessing Church in the 1930s he wrote more compromising music and was "left alone" by the Nazis. He composed a Deutsche Choralmesse in 1931, setting not the Order of Mass, but a series of chorales related to the functions in the liturgy of the mass, and thus comparable to Schubert's Deutsche Messe. In 1938, after a 1937 Church Music Festival in which he participated, he composed a German mass, Deutsche Messe: Kyrie Gott Vater in Ewigkeit (German Mass: Kyrie God Father in Eternity) for a six-part mixed choir, which stressed German, following the party line.

Pepping composed no more church music until 1948, when he wrote the Missa Dona nobis pacem, possibly as a "personal plea". The musicologist Sven Hiemke who analyzed the work in a book on Pepping's mass compositions notes that the work can be understood as Bekenntnismusik (confessional music) even if the composer would disagree.

== Structure and music ==
The mass is structured in five sections of different allocations of the soprano, alto, tenor and bass voices (SATB): In the following table of the movements, the markings and time signatures are taken from the score.

Incipit	English	Voices	Marking	Time
Kyrie	Lord, have mercy	SATB	Grave	4/2
Gloria	Glory [to God in the highest]	SSATBB	Allegro sostenuto	4/2, 12/4
Credo	I believe	SATB + SATB	Agitato	changing
Sanctus and Benedictus	Holy and Blessed	SSATBB	Moderato	4/2
Agnus dei and Dona nobis pacem	Lamb of God and Grand us peace	SSATBB	Grave	4/2

Pepping uses polyphony and a modal tonality to achieve a characteristic colourful sound ("charakteristische Farbigkeit des Klanges"). A reviewer of a recording notes that the first reactions saw a relation of the disturbing ("verstörend") setting of the text to the time of its creation – full of uncertainty and dread of the future – while Pepping refused to acknowledge a relation between his music and his life. The mass shows brittle, jagged sections ("spröde, zerklüftete Abschnitte") in complex formality and composition technique, especially in the fugues. Other sections show a rather meditative sound of only four parts.

== Publication and performances ==
The premiere was planned for 31 October 1948 as part of the Berliner Kirchenmusiktage (Berlin Days of Church Music). Instead, the work was first performed in Berlin on 17 November 1948 by the Spandauer Kantorei, conducted by Gottfried Grote, then the director of the Spandauer Kirchenmusikschule.

The 24 page manuscript, including corrections and sketches, is kept in Berlin.

The first edition was by Bärenreiter in 1948. The editor Richard Baum wrote on 18 September 1948: "Wir sind glücklich, dieses außerordentliche Werk verlegen zu dürfen. [...] Man wird gefesselt und beeindruckt von der kontrapunktischen Feinarbeit ebenso wie von der harmonischen Farbigkeit und der starken Rhythmik des Werkes." (We are happy to publish this extraordinary work. [...] One will be spellbound and impressed by the contrapuntal precision work as well as by the colourful harmonies and the strong rhythm of the work.) Further editions followed in 1962 and 1996.

The review of a performance in the Marktkirche Wiesbaden in October 1980 by the Kantorei St. Johannis of the Neustädter Kirche, conducted by Pepping's pupil Erhard Egidi was titled Intensives Bekenntnis (Intense profession), confirming the character of the music as a personal statement.

== Selected recordings ==
- Missa Dona nobis pacem, Ein jegliches hat seine Zeit, Choralsätze (Vol. 10 of the Pepping Collection), Kreuzberger Kantorei, Volkher Häusler
- Missa, with the motets Jesus und Nikodemus, Ein jegliches hat seine Zeit, Uns ist ein Kind geboren, Bernd Stegmann, Berliner Vokalensemble, Cantate, 2006
