= Erhard Egidi =

German cantor, organist and music composer

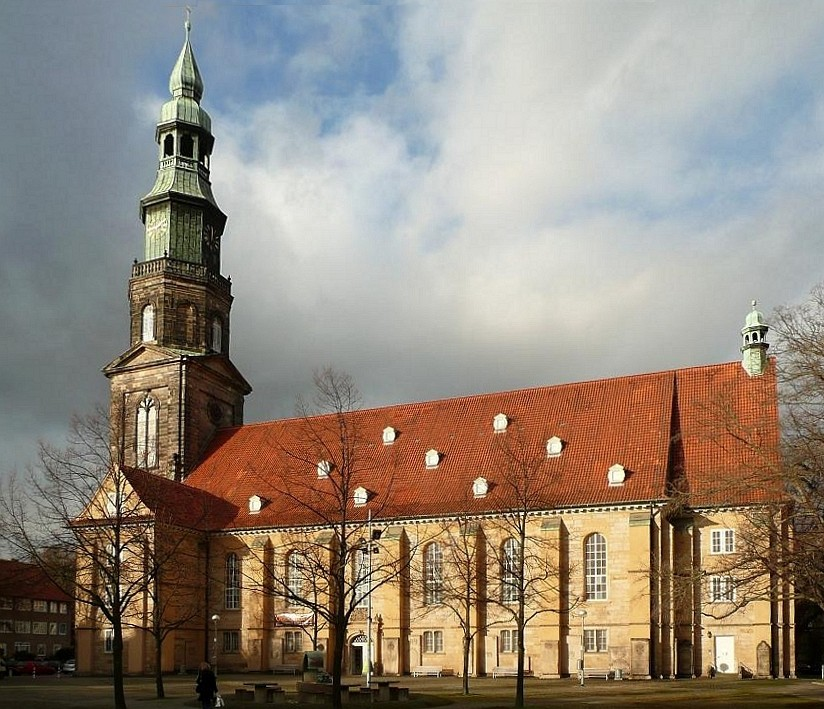
- Neustädter Kirche, Hannover, where he was responsible for the Protestant church music of Hannover, 2009
- Born: 23 April 1929; Rheinsberg, Germany
- Died: 8 September 2014 (aged 85); Hannover, Germany
- Education: Spandauer Kirchenmusikschule
- Occupation: Kantor
- Years active: 1954–1991

Erhard Egidi (23 April 1929 – 8 September 2014) was a German cantor, organist and composer of sacred music. He was Kantor at the Neustädter Kirche, Hannover, from 1972 to 1991, where he focused on music in church services, but also conducted concerts, with a preference for works of Johann Sebastian Bach and his own teacher Ernst Pepping. He was appointed Kirchenmusikdirektor (church music director), responsible for the church music of Hanover.

== Career ==
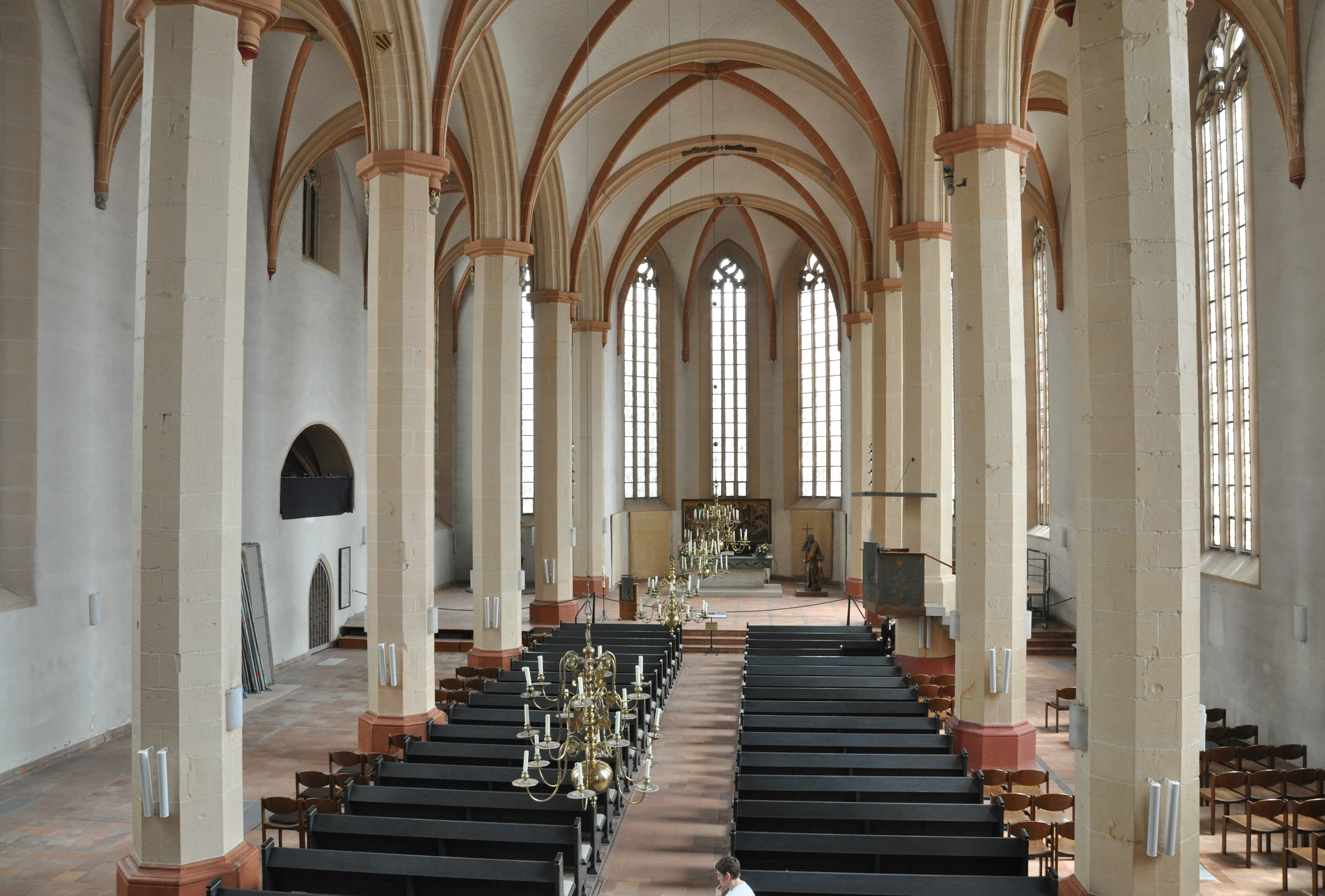
St. Lamberti, Hildesheim, where he worked from 1954 to 1972

Born in Rheinsberg, he studied in Berlin at the Spandauer Kirchenmusikschule (Spandau academy of church music) with Gottfried Grote, Ernst Pepping and Herbert Schulze. He was cantor at St. Lamberti, Hildesheim from 1954. He included contemporary music, for example in 1957 a concert for Trinity Sunday with works including works by Johann Nepomuk David, Burkhard's Die Sintflut, and Pepping's setting of the Gospel for the Sunday, Jesus und Nikodemus from the Gospel of John, and a setting of the Epistle, "O welch eine Tiefe des Reichtums".

From 1972 Egidi was cantor at the Neustädter Kirche, Hannover, later appointed Kirchenmusikdirektor (church music director), responsible for the church music of Hanover. His first concert with the chorale Kantorei St. Johannis presented Bach's Missa in A and Mozart's Vesperae solennes de confessore. As a keyboard player, he performed works for harpsichord, such as Bach's Goldberg Variations, and for clavichord, for example a sonata by Friedrich Wilhelm Rust. He performed Bach's Clavierübung III with his wife Maria on two organs in 1986. Each autumn, the choir toured with an a cappella program. In 1980 it included a concert at the Marktkirche in Wiesbaden, with Leonhard Lechner's motet Ach Gott, Dir tu ich klagen, Bach's motet Der Geist hilft unser Schwachheit auf, BWV 226, and Pepping's Missa Dona nobis pacem. Destinations have included Copenhagen (1972), Paris (1973), Strasbourg (1979), Black Forest (1982, including Bach's Jesu, meine Freude), and Vaduz (1987), and small towns without choirs.

Egidi founded a chamber orchestra Kammerorchester St. Johannis, mostly of teachers and students of the Musikhochschule Hannover, to play with the choir and perform instrumental concerts. He performed in 1979 Handel's Messiah, with soloists Ute Frühhaber, Renate Naber, Lutz-Michael Harder and Heiner Eckels. In 1982 he conducted Bach's St Matthew Passion with Harder as the Evangelist, and Gerhard Faulstich as vox Christi. On 11 June 1983 Egidi conducted Bach's Mass in B minor for the "20. Deutscher Evangelischer Kirchentag". The last movement, Dona nobis pacem (Give us peace), matched a visible participation of members of the Peace movement in the audience. In 1986 he combined Stravinsky's Canticum sacrum and Ein deutsches Requiem by Brahms, in 1988 he conducted Stravinsky's Cantata and Mozart's Great Mass in C minor, in 1990 Bach's Mass in B minor.

In November 1990 he performed a Trauermusik (Funeral music) by Johann Anton Coberg that had been lost for 300 years. The owner had found the print of 1683, a score of 40 pages, on a farm close to Loccum. Coberg had been the first organist at the Neustädter Kirche, who composed the work likely for the memory of Heinrich von Voß, who had served at the court of Ernst August and died on 23 September 1682. The first performance on 24 October 1682 was conducted by cantor Arnold Meyer. The work is set for up to eight voices and continuo and contains the ten stanzas of the hymn "Herr Jesus Christ, meins Lebens Licht" (1608), interspersed with concertos on Bible passages and a concluding motet for double choir. Egidi prepared the parts from the score and combined the work in concert on 25 November 1990 with Bach's motet Komm, Jesu, komm and cantata Wachet auf, ruft uns die Stimme, BWV 140, and Stravinsky's Psalmensymphonie.

In his last concert before his retirement in 1991, Egidi performed once more in 1991 Bach's St Matthew Passion, with Dantes Diwiak as the Evangelist, Anselm Richter as vox Christi, Monika Frimmer, Ralf Popken and Joachim Gebhardt. The review by Hugo Thielen on 12 March 1991 in the HAZ stressed the dramatic drive and the concentrated performance.

He kept playing concerts for historic keyboard instruments, such as a program for clavichord on 13 October 2001. Several of his private organ students became cantors, such as Axel Fischer and Alexander Kuhlo. Egidi composed works for use in the church, some were published by Carus-Verlag.

Egidi died on 8 September 2014 at the age of 85.
