= Neustädter Kirche =

Neustädter Kirche may refer to several churches in Germany:

- Neustädter Kirche, Erlangen
- Neustädter Kirche, Eschwege, a 75 m tall church
- Neustädter Kirche, Hannover
