= Lothar Mohn =

German church musician (born 1954)

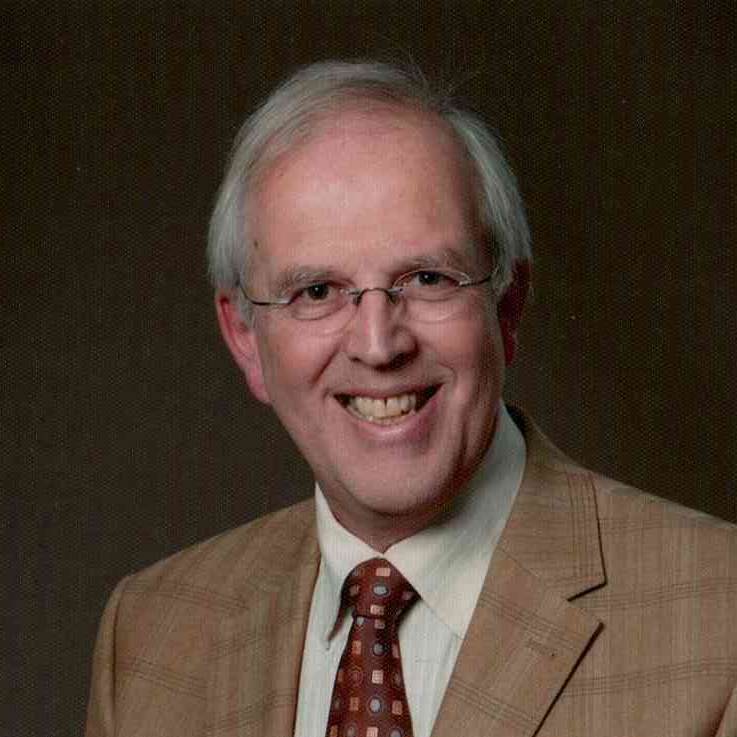
Lothar Mohn, 2010

Lothar Mohn (born 6 November 1954) is a German church musician.

After studying church music at the "Hochschule für Kirchenmusik der Evangelischen Kirche von Westfalen" (Translated from german: University for church music of Protestant Church in Westfalen) in Herford, he was the cantor of the "Petrikirche" in Melle and regional cantor from 1982 to 1991. In 1991, he succeeded Erhard Egidi as cantor of the Neustädter Kirche in Hanover and church music director. At the church, he leads the Kantorei St. Johannis, a handbell choir and a senior choir.

He was the initiator of the foundation Musikstiftung St. Johannis. From 1997 to 2006, he was president of the association of church musicians in the Protestant Landeskirche Hanover. From 2007 to 2008, he was president of the national association. He was co-editor of the journal "Forum Kirchenmusik".

== Selected publications ==
as author

- Die Christian-Vater-Orgel in der St.-Petri-Kirche zu Melle in „Der Grönegau“. In: Meller Jahrbuch. vol. 6 (1988), ps. 52–69.
- Chorbuch Mendelssohn (Chor & Orgel), Jubiläumsausgabe zum 200. Geburtstag Mendelssohns. ISMN M-007-09340-2, Carus-Verlag CV 4.105

as editor

- Gott loben – das ist unser Amt. Orgelvorspiele zum Evangelischen Gesangbuch. ISMN M-2007-1651-1
