= St. Lamberti, Hildesheim =

St. Lamberti
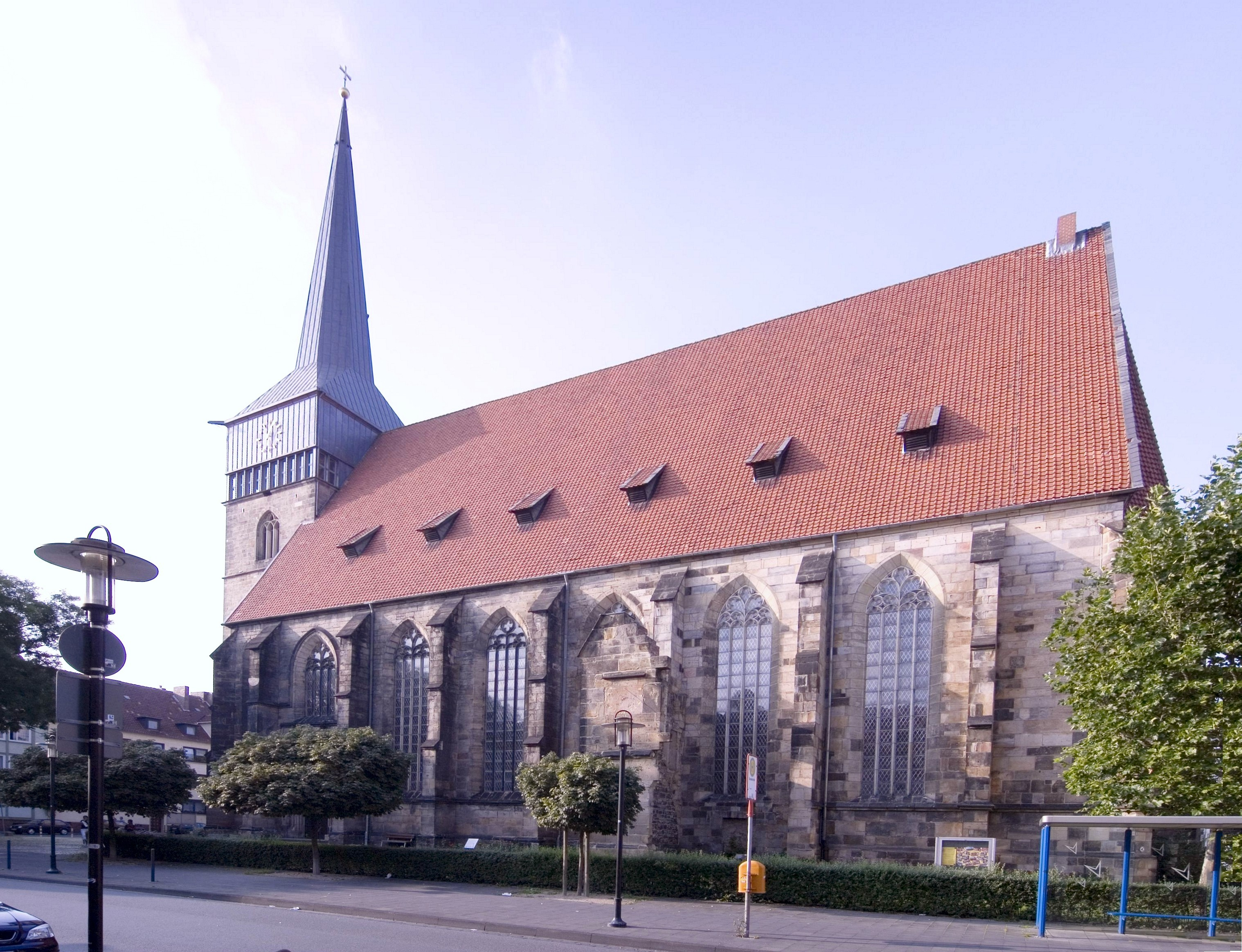
- St. Lamberti from the south, 2007
- St. Lamberti
- 52°8′51″N 9°57′17″E
- Location: Hildesheim, Lower Saxony
- Country: Germany
- Denomination: Lutheran
- Previous denomination: Catholic
- Website: www.st-lamberti-hildesheim.de

History
- Consecrated: 1488

Architecture
- Architectural type: hall church
- Style: Gothic

Administration
- Deanery: Hildesheim-Sarstedt (Kirchenkreis)
- Parish: St.-lamberti-Gemeinde, Hildesheim

St. Lamberti is a parish and church in Hildesheim, Germany, the parish of the town's Neustadt (new town). It is named after Lambert of Maastricht, the patron saint of Hildesheim. The church is a late Gothic building, the only hall church of the town. Since the Reformation, it has been a Lutheran parish church. It is situated in the Goschenstraße (Goschen Road), on the Neustädter Markt (New town market).

== History ==
The Hildesheim town seal of 1300 depicts the previous twin-towered Romanesque church on the site; while excavations in the summer of 1952 revealed that the first Church St Lamberti was similar in design to the nearby Godehardikirche with the cruciform design of a Romanesque basilica. To a degree, this plan corresponds to the design of the present church; the crossing of the older church corresponds exactly to the site between present nave and chancel; the present church has side aisles, but no transepts to form a true crossing.

The foundation stone for the new building was laid (according to an inscription on the north eastern buttresses of the choir) on 13 May 1474. On completion of the choir in 1488, the church was consecrated and dedicated to Lambert of Maastricht; however overall completion was to take over 30 years; during this period, those parts not yet demolished of the older church continue to be used. The nave, with its rib vault of seven bays was completed in 1505.

As a result of the Reformation, in 1542 the church became Lutheran, as did all parish churches of the town, except the Cathedral and most monastic churches. St Lamberti's churchyard was used for burials until 1812, and in 1816 was transformed into a garden.

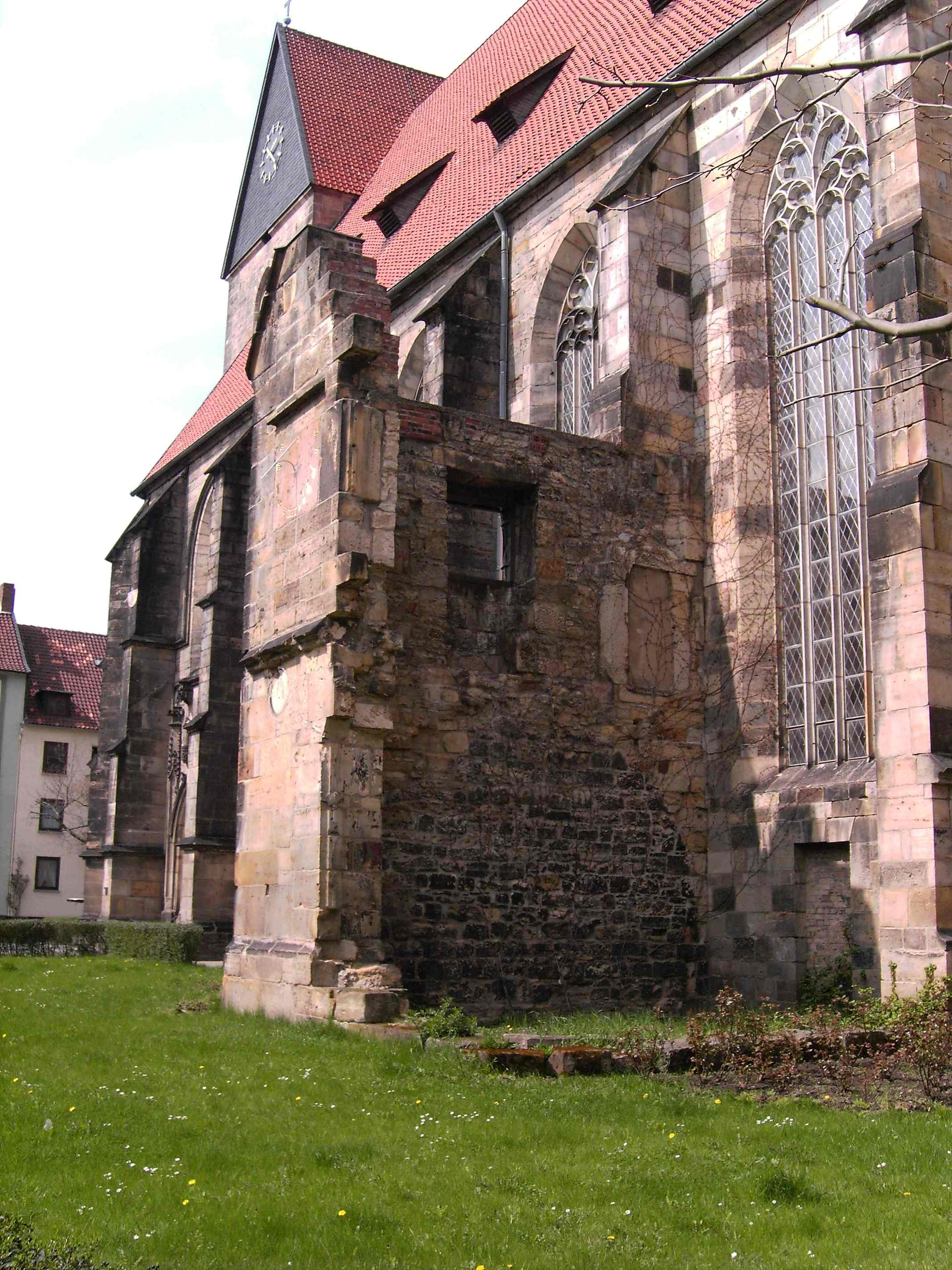
Southern annex left as a ruin as a memorial, 2006

The church was almost destroyed by Allied bombing on 22 March 1945. It had already suffered significant damage to the choir's roof and windows in February of that year, but the latter air-raid razed all but the base of the tower and some remnants of the nave's walls. A rebuilding program, sponsored by the Protestant Church, was completed in 1952. However, a southern annex, dating from 1482, was left in ruins as a memorial monument. The tower was left with a provisional roof, but was given a new spire in 2007.

== Interior ==
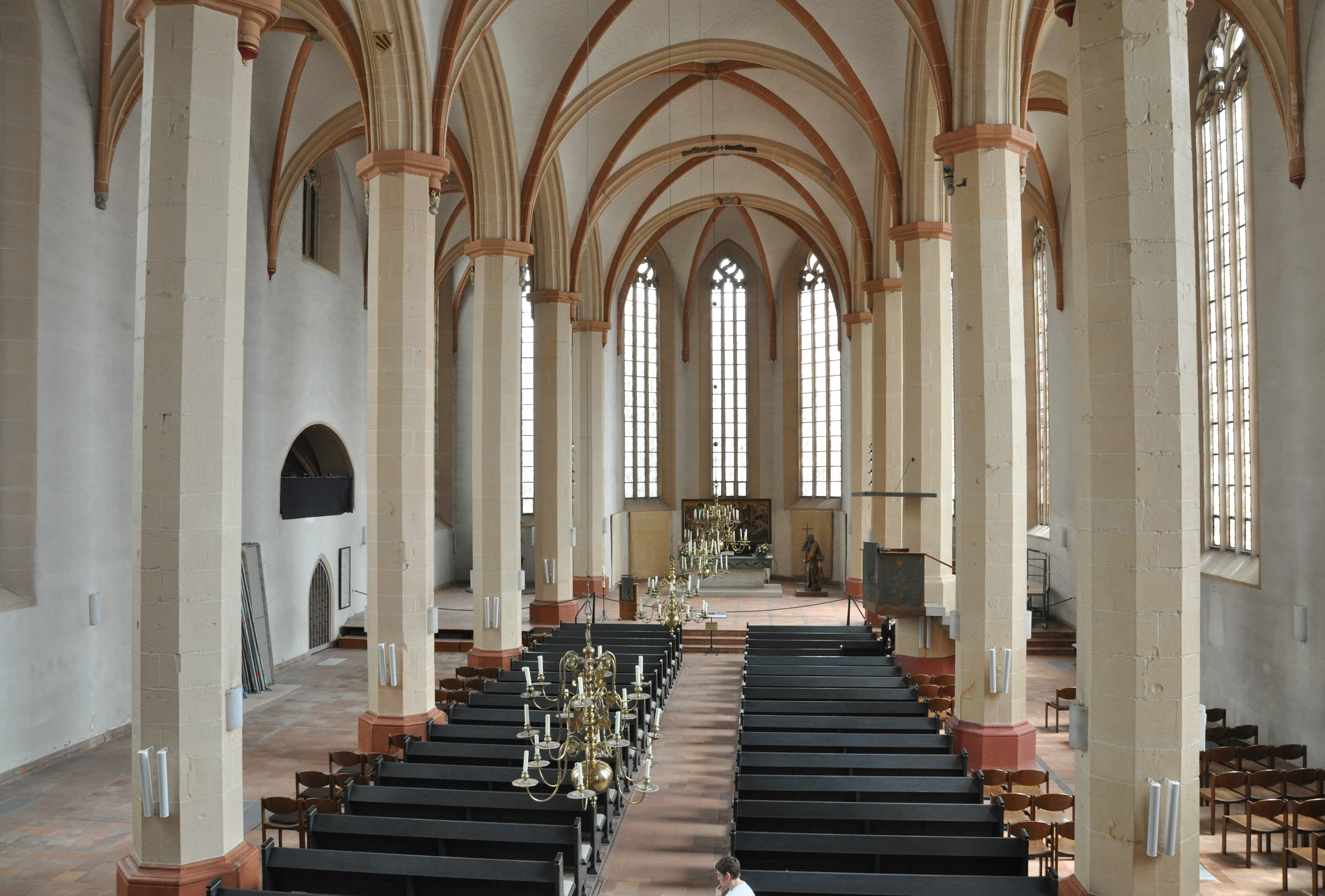
Interior

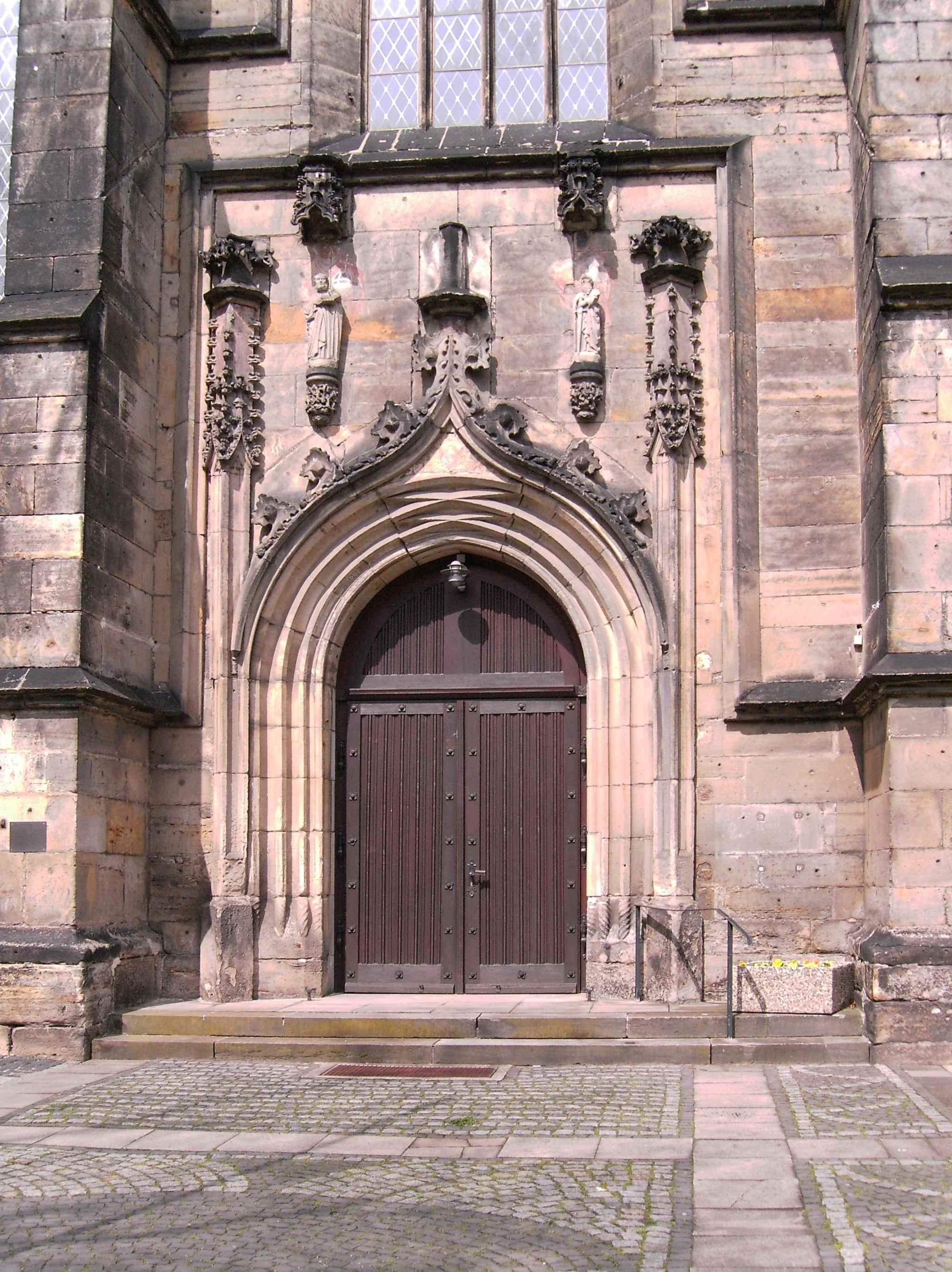
The church's Gothic principal entrance

The principal entrance is on the western side of the building while the choir, of Peter and Paul, faces east with the Passion altar constructed in 1420. The pulpit, used on special occasions, was built by Carl Dornick; it is engraved with figures.

The baptismal font was constructed in 1502; it is mounted on three lion masks and has an impressive cover made in 1550 by Hans Meissner of Brunswick. The unique features of the font are the embossed figure of St. Lambert (wearing shoes), the patron saint of the Church, and an unusual cruciform. The cover of the font has images of 36 dancing angels, four times nine, four representing the evangelists and the rivers of Paradise, nine for the choirs of angels. Eleven of the angels are male (12 disciples minus Judas Iscariot) and twenty-five are female (the five senses multiplied by five). Above the angels are eight additional figures of saints: John the Baptist, St. Luke, Andrew the Apostle, John the Evangelist, St. Peter, St. Matthew, Paul the Apostle and Markus the Evangelist.

== Church music ==
Church music has a long tradition at the church. A small organ was built in 1590 by Henning Hencke (1550-c.1620). It was sold in 1715 and replaced by a large Baroque organ, built by Johann Matthias Naumann, a pupil of Arp Schnitger. It was restored several times, but destroyed in 1945. The present instrument was built by Ernst Palandt, who used material from several Baroque organs, trying to create an instrument similar to the destroyed one. He finished his work in 1960. The Kantorei (chorale) performs in services, but also concerts of Bach's Passions, masses of the classical period and works by John Rutter, among others. They offer weekends with a Bach cantata rehearsed with a project choir and performed in a service the next day. Erhard Egidi was cantor until 1972, when he moved to the Neustädter Kirche, Hannover. Cantor as of 2013 is Helge Metzner, who is also regional cantor. The church runs a weekly concert series Musik zur Marktzeit (music during market time) on Saturdays. The 1500th event took place in 2012.

== Literature ==
- Fritz Garbe: St. Lamberti in Hildesheim von der Väter Tagen bis in unsere Zeit. Gerstenberg, Hildesheim 1960
- Johannes Heinrich Gebauer: Geschichte der Neustadt Hildesheim. Lax, Hildesheim/Leipzig 1937, ISBN 3-8269-6305-9
- Nicolaus Heutger: Aus Hildesheims Kirchengeschichte. Lax, Hildesheim 1984, ISBN 3-7848-4027-2
- derselbe, 500 Jahre Hallenkirche St. Lamberti in der Hildesheimer Neustadt 1488-1988. Hildesheim 1988
