= Hochreither =

Hochreither is a surname of German origin. People with that name include:

- Joseph Balthasar Hochreither (1669-1731), Austrian organist and composer
- Karl Hochreither (1933-2018), German organist, conductor, music educator and musicologist

== See also ==
- Sepp Hochreiter (born 1967), German computer scientist
