= Ernst Palandt =

German organ builder (1907–1979)

Ernst Palandt (7 March 1907 – 6 July 1979) was a German organ builder.

== Life ==
Born in Bochum, Palandt worked as an organ builder in Halberstadt and Hildesheim between 1933 and 1969. He initially entered into a partnership with Wilhelm Sohnle and operated under the name E. Palandt & Sohnle KG. In 1952, the two separated and Palandt continued to work alone as the owner of the Hildesheim organ building workshop. In 1970, long-time employee Dieter Kollibay took over the company.

His estate is of particular importance because Palandt conducted intensive historical research on the organs he restored and maintained before the Destruction of Hildesheim and left behind extracts of files. He also built up an extensive photographic archive. Even if Palandt's work on historic organs no longer corresponds to the current state of restorative organ building, he nevertheless preserved essential substance and preserved many organs.

Accordingly, Palandt saw himself stylistically committed to the organ-building tradition of the North German Baroque.

Palandt died in Hildesheim at the age of 72.

== List of works (selection) ==
Year	Location	Building	Picture	Manual	Stops	Notes
1939	Halberstadt	St.-Johannes-Kirche		III/P	37	Behind historical casing of Elias (1605); destroyed in 1945
1940–1944	Aschersleben	St.-Stephani-Kirche		III/P	51	Extension reconstruction of the organ by Ernst Röver (1907) behind facade by Edmund Schulze (1855)
1953	Hildesheim	St. Lamberti, Hildesheim		III/P	29	Technical new construction in historic baroque casing using historic pipe material, main work by Johann Conrad Müller (1765), Rückpositiv from the beginning of the 18th century; removal of a Brustwerk prepared.
1958	Braunschweig	Brüdernkirche, Chororgel		I/P	9	In baroque casing, today integrated as Rückpositiv of the Steinmann organ, separately playable
1958	Braunschweig	Heilig-Geist-Kirche		II/P	25	The disposition goes back to the organ of the St. Mauritius Church.
1965	Bartolfelde	St.-Bartholdi-Kirche		II/P	13	
1965	Katlenburg-Lindau	Ev. Kirche		II/P	14	

== Publications ==
- Hildesheimer Orgelchronik 1962. 1st issue. Ein Bildwerk als Tätigkeitsbericht zum 25- bzw. 140-jährigen Bestehen der Hildesheimer Orgelbauwerkstatt, Hildesheim 1962.
- Hildesheimer Orgelchronik 1969. 2nd issue. Orgelwerke, Orgelbauer und Organisten der Hildesheimer Neustadt, Hildesheim 1969.
- Hildesheimer Orgelchronik 1973. 3rd issue. Geschichte der Domorgeln, Hildesheim 1973.
- Hildesheimer Orgelchronik 1975. 4th issue. Die Geschichte der Orgelwerke in St. Andreas zu Hildesheim, Hildesheim 1975.
- Die Geschichte der Orgelwerke in St. Godehardi. In Alt-Hildesheim 48 (1977), Jahrbuch für Stadt und Stift Hildesheim issue 1, 1919 – 62nd issue, 1991.
- with Franz Philipp, Liste: Die Hildesheimer Handschrift: Bestandsaufnahme aller Orgeldispositionen im Anfang d. 19. Jahrhunderts, Verlag Lax, 1976.
- Von deutscher Orgelbaukunst: eine kulturhistorische Werkstattstudie, Hildesheim 1934.
- Organographia historica Cellensis; Hildesheim 1932.

Also:

- Johann Hermann Biermann, Organographia Hildesiensis specialis, Hildesheim 1738, reprint with an afterword by Ernst Palandt, Kassel 1930, pp. 23–24.
