= Martin Behrmann =

German author and choral conductor

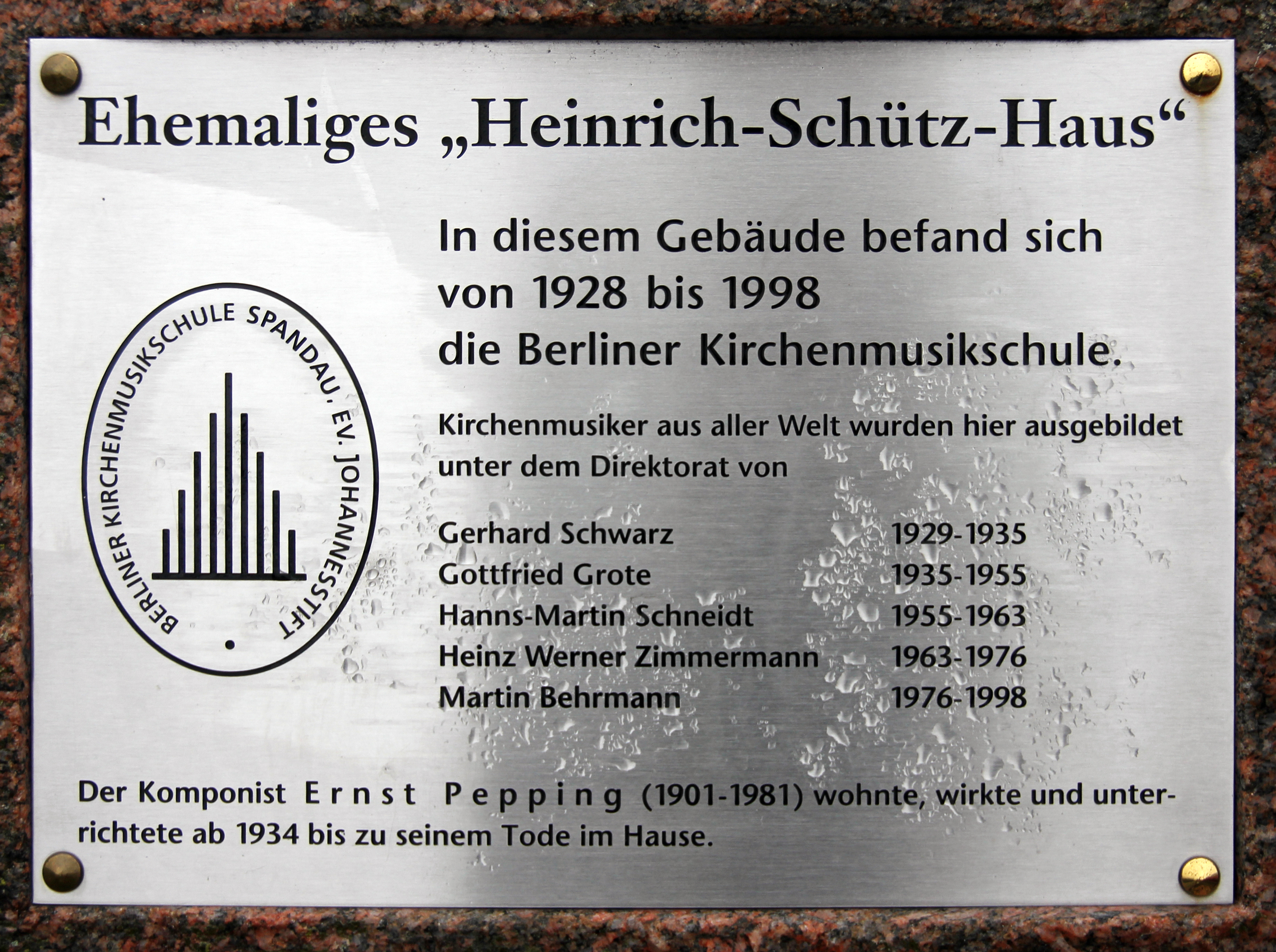
Commemorative plaque at the "Janusz-Korczak-Haus", Schönwalder Allee 26, in Hakenfelde

Martin Behrmann (16 July 1930 – 5 January 2014) was a German choirmaster and university teacher.

== Life ==
Born in Dessau, Behrmann was a grammar school pupil at the Katharineum in Lübeck and passed the Abitur at the Johanneum in Hamburg. He studied church music at the Musikhochschule Freiburg and pipe organ with Walter Kraft. He passed the A-examination at the Musikhochschule Lübeck.

From 1957 to 1966 he was cantor at the St. Andreas Church in Hamburg. He founded the Cappella Vocale Hamburg and was choir conducting teacher at the Hamburg University of Music until 1966. In 1966 he followed the call to teach choir conducting at the Spandauer Kirchenmusikschule (KMS), whose director he was from 1976 to 1998. He directed the Spandauer Kantorei for 29 years.

Behrmann was also involved with foreign church music associations such as the Sambalikhaan Foundation in the Philippines. There, together with other renowned church music teachers, he participated in corresponding workshops. The theological faculty of the Humboldt University in Berlin awarded him the title of professor. Until 2010, he taught at the Korean National University of Arts in Seoul, Korea.

Behrmann died in Löningen in Oldenburger Münsterland at age 83.

== Publications ==
- Chorleitung. Musikverlag Carus, Stuttgart, 1984, ISBN 3-923053-04-5
  SCM Hänssler, ISBN 3-7753-0876-8
- Pepping, Ernst (1971). Festschrift Ernst Pepping : zu seinem 70. Geburtstag am 12. September 1971 (in German). Berlin: Merseburger. ISBN 978-3-87537-003-4. OCLC 271554.

== Recordings ==
- Schubert, Franz (2007). "SCHUBERT : German and Latin Masses". Naxos Digital Services Ltd. OCLC 716489734.
- Schubert, Franz (2001), Franz Schubert : Messen nr. 2, 3, 5, 6 : Masses no. 2, 3, 5, 6 (in German), EMI Records, OCLC 813424422
- Ernst Pepping Passionsbericht des Matthäus (von Spandauer Kantorei und Capella Vocale Hamburg, Behrmann, Cad (Note 1), Audio-CD 2003. OCLC 27702548
- César Franck Dramatische Evangelienmotetten (von Spandauer Kantorei Berlin, Cap.Vocale Hamburg, Behrmann, Hänssler, Audio-CD 1997. OCLC 812117577
- 25 Classical Christian Favorites. Cameo. OCLC 64563661
- Johann Hermann Schein Israelsbrünnlein, Vox. OCLC 313333499
