= Helmut Barbe =

German composer (1927–2021)

Helmut Barbe (28 December 1927, Halle (Saale) – 18 April 2021, Berlin) was a German composer.

Barbe studied at the Berlin School of Church Music where he was taught by Gottfried Grote and Ernst Pepping. Between 1952 and 1975 he was the cantor at the church St. Nikolai in Berlin's Spandau quarter. After this, he took a post as a professor at the Berlin University of the Arts in what was at that time West Berlin.

In 1956 Barbe premiered his musical Hallelujah, Billy at the German Evangelical Church Assembly in Frankfurt am Main. This led commentators to identify him as a pioneer of contemporary worship music, in German Neues Geistliches Lied (NGL, literally: new spiritual song).
