= Willy Burkhard =

Swiss composer and academic teacher

- Born: 17 April 1900; Evilard, Canton of Bern, Switzerland
- Died: 18 June 1955 (aged 55); Zürich, Switzerland
- Occupations: Composer; Academic teacher
- Organizations: Berne Conservatory; Zürich Conservatory

Willy Burkhard (17 April 1900 – 18 June 1955) was a Swiss composer and academic teacher, influential in both capacities. He taught music theory at the Berne Conservatory and the Zürich Conservatory. His works include an opera, oratorios, cantatas, and many instrumental genres from piano pieces to symphonies.

== Life ==
Burkhard was born in Evilard, Canton of Bern. He attended and graduated from a teachers' training college Evangelisches Lehrerseminar Muristalden. He also study with Ernst Graf, organist at the Berner Münster. He moved to Leipzig to study piano with Robert Teichmüller and composition with Sigfrid Karg-Elert. After Leipzig, he moved on to Munich to study with Walter Courvoisier and later to Paris to work with Max d'Ollone.

From 1924, he began teaching composition, theory and the piano in Berne. He was appointed professor at the Berne Conservatory in 1928. He conducted several choirs and small orchestras there. In 1932 he was struck with tuberculosis, and was compelled to live for several years in Montana and Davos. During that time, he turned more towards composition. He settled in Zürich in 1942 and taught composition and music theory at the Zürich Conservatory, where his students included Klaus Huber, Rudolf Kelterborn, Ernst Pfiffner, Armin Schibler and Ernst Widmer. In 1950 he received a prize from the Schweizerischer Tonkünstlerverein (Swiss Association of Musicians). He died in Zürich in 1955 at the age of 55.

== Work ==
Burkhard published 98 works with Opus numbers, and left a large amount of unpublished works held as manuscripts by the Paul Sacher Foundation. He began to compose in late-Romantic style. His personal style developed from 1930, comparable to Paul Hindemith and Frank Martin. Late in life, he used some features of twelve-tone composition, but remained within tonality. He was interested to compose for voices, and regarded for renovated sacred music.

Burkhard is known for sacred choral music, including oratorios Das Gesicht Jesajas (Isaiah's vision) and Das Jahr (The year), and the cantata Die Sintflut (The Flood). He composed an opera, Die Schwarze Spinne based on Gotthelf's novella The Black Spider. He wrote song settings for solo voice and choirs, chamber music and piano works. His orchestral music was often dedicated to Paul Sacher's Sinfonietta, including a Violin Concerto, and two symphonies.

=== Dramatic works ===
- Im Zeichen des Kreuzes, incidental music, 1938–9
- Laupenspiel, Op. 56, radio score, 1939
- Oedipus rex, Op. 72, incidental music to Oedipus Rex by Sophocles, speaking choruses, wind instruments, timpani, 1944
- Die schwarze Spinne, text by R. Faesi and G. Boner based on Gotthelf's The Black Spider, Op. 80, 1948, rev. 1954

=== Accompanied choral works ===
- Choral duets, Op. 22/1, text by Christian Morgenstern, men's choir, tpt, trombones, Op. 22/2, text by Conrad Ferdinand Meyer, choir, vn, fl, 1926–28
- Till Ulenspiegel, cantata, Op. 24, T, B, male chorus, orch, 1929
- Vorfrühling, cantata, text by Morgenstern, Op. 27, chorus, str, 1930
- Te Deum, Op. 33, choir 2vv, tpt, trombone, timp, org, 1931
- Spruchkantate, Op. 38, text by Joseph von Eichendorff, male chorus, str, 1933
- Musikalische Übung, Op. 39, Psalm 12 translate by Martin Luther, choir and organ, 1934
- Das Gesicht Jesajas, oratorio, Op. 41, solo voice, choir, organ and orchestra, 1933–5
- Die Versuchung Jesu, cantata, Op. 44, A/B, unison vv ad lib, org, 1936
- Ps xciii, Op. 49, Psalm 17, unison vv, org, 1937
- Genug ist nicht genug, cantata, text by Meyer, Op. 53, chorus, 2 tpt, timp, str, 1938–9
- Lob der Musik, cantata, Op. 54, solo vv, chorus, orch, c1939
- Cantate Domino, Op. 61/2, S, chorus, str, timp, 1940
- Heimatliche Kantate, text by Gottfried Keller, Op. 61/3, Mez/Bar, unison vv ad lib, orch, 1940
- Kreuzvolk der Schweiz, text by Meyer, Op. 61/4, chorus, org, 1941
- Das Jahr, oratorio, text by H. Hiltbrunner, Op. 62, solo vv, chorus, orch, 1942
- Christi Leidensverkündigung, cantata, Op. 65, T, small chorus, org, 1942
- Cantique de notre terre, text by J. P. Zimmermann, Op. 67, solo vv, chorus, orch, 1943
- Mass, Op. 85, soprano, bass, choir and orchestra, 1951
- Psalmen-Kantate, Op. 90, S, chorus, org, chbr orch, 1952
- Ps clxviii, Op. 96, Psalm ?, unison vv, insts, 1954

=== Unaccompanied choral works ===
- 2 Choruses, Op. 2, 1923
- Cantata, text from the Bible, Op. 3, tenor and choir, 1923
- Motets, Op. 10, boys' choir, 1925
- 8 Sprüche aus dem ‘Cherubinischen Wandersmann’, 2 sets, Op. 17/1, text by Angelus Silesius, 1927
- Ezzolied, Op. 19, motet, 1927
- 5 Gesänge, text by Richard Dehmel, Op. 26, 1930
- 24 Melodien aus den Hassler’schen Choralgesängen, Op. 30, 4vv, 1931
- Das deutsche Sanctus, 2 unison choruses, 1932
- Neue Kraft, suite, text from the Bible etc., Op. 34, 1932
- 4 Choruses, Op. 35, male chorus, 1936
- Der Tod, chorus 4vv, 1933
- Vermahnlied, 2–4vv, 1934
- Bärnerlüt, male chorus 4vv, 1935
- 2 Gesänge, chorus 4vv, 1936
- Choruses, Op. 47, male chorus, 1936
- Die Verkündigung Mariä, motet, Op. 51, 1938
- 5 Choräle, chorus, 1939
- Sommerzeit, Op. 61/1, 1940
- 9 folksong arrangements, s. and chorus, female chorus, 1942
- 2 Choruses: Mon âme, bénis l’éternel, Oui, glorifiez l’éternel, 1942
- Kleiner Psalter, Op. 82, 1949
- Frühlingsglaube, text by Keller, male chorus, 1950
- Wer das längere Lebensteil wünscht, male chorus 4vv, 1950
- 2 Gesänge, 2vv, 1952
- Die Sintflut, cantata, Op. 97, chorus 8vv, 195

=== Orchestral works ===
- Violin Concerto No. 1, Op. 7, 1925
- Suite aus der Musik zu einem Weihnachtsmärchen, Op. 12, 1926
- Symphony, Op. 21, 1926–8
- Ulenspiegel-Variationen, Op. 37 [prelude to op.24], 1932
- Fantasy, Op. 40, str, 1934
- Kleine Serenade, Op. 42, str, 1935
- Concerto, Op. 50, str, 1939
- Hymnus, Op. 57, 1939
- Concertino, Op. 60, vc, str, 1940
- Violin Concerto No. 2, Op. 69, 1943
- Symphony No. 2 (one movement), Op. 73, 1944
- Concerto, Op. 74, org, str, brass, 1945
- Konzertstück, Op. 75, org, orch, 1945
- Canzona, Op. 76, 2 fl, low str, 1945
- Kleine konzertante Suite, Op. 79, 1946
- Piccola sinfonia giocosa, Op. 81, small orchestra, 1949
- Fantasia mattutina, Op. 83, 1949; Toccata, op.86, 1951
- Sonata da camera, Op. 89, str, perc, 1952
- Viola Concerto, Op. 93, 1953
- Concertino, Op. 94, 2 fl, hpd, str, 1954
- Divertimento, Op. 95, str, 1954

=== Chamber music ===
- Fantasie, Op. 1, pf, 1922
- Variationen über ein Volkslied, Op. 8, pf, 1925
- Inventionen, Op. 14, pf, 1926
- String Trio No, 1, Op. 13, 1 movt, 1926
- Kleine zweistimmige Suite, Op. 14a [arr. op.14], 11 insts, 1926
- 3 Preludes and Fugues, Op. 16, pf, 1927
- 2 Trio Sonatas, Op. 18, org, 1927
- Kleine Serenade, Op. 15, vn, va, 1927
- Stinis Puppe Theresli, pf, 1928
- String Quartet No. 1, Op. 23, 1929
- Variations on a *Minuet by Haydn", Op. 29, pf, 1930
- Variations on Chorale settings by Hassler, Op. 28, org, 1930
- Kleine Stücke, Op. 31, pf, 1931
- Fantasie, v32, org, 1931
- Wer nur den lieben Gott lässt walten, partita, org, 1932
- Grosser Gott wir loben dich, partita, org, 1932
- Praeludium und Fuge, E, org, 1932
- Was die Hirten alles erlebten, pf, 1935
- Piano Trio, Op. 43, 1936
- Sonatina, Op. 45, vn, pf, 1936
- Suite, Op. 48, 2 vn, 1937
- 8 kleine Klavierstücke, 1938
- Sonatina, Op. 52, org, 1938
- Fantasy and Chorale "Ein feste Burg", op.58, org, 1939
- Sonata, Op. 59, va, 1939
- Etude concertante, vc, pf, 1940
- Sonatina, pf, 1940
- Weichnachtssonatine, Op. 71/1, pf, 1940
- Sonata, Op. 66, pf, 1943
- String Quartet No. 2, Op. 68, 1943
- Suite en miniature, Op. 71/2, vn, pf, 1944
- Serenade, Op. 71/3, fl, gui, c1945
- Serenade, Op. 77, fl, cl, bn, hn, vn, va, db, hp, 1945
- 4 Intermezzi, Op. 77a, hp, 1945
- Sonata, Op. 78, vn, pf, 1946
- Canzona, Op. 76a, 2 fl/fl, ob, pf/org, 1947
- Sonata, Op. 87, vc, pf, 1952
- Lyrische Musik, Op. 88, fl, va, vc, pf, c1952
- Choral-Triptychon, Op. 91, org, 1953
- Serenade, Op. 92, fl, cl, 1953
- Suite, Op. 98, fl, 1955
- 6 Preludes, Op. 99, pf, 1955
- Romanze, hn, pf

=== Solo vocal music ===
- 7 Songs, Op. 4, 1v, pf, 1924–5
- 6 Songs, Op. 5, 1v, pf, 1923–5
- 4 Nachtlieder, Op. 6, 1v, pf, 1924
- Frage, Op. 9, song cycle, 1v, pf, 1925
- 3 Duets, Op. 11, text by Friedrich Hebbel, 2S, vn, 1926
- 2 Rilke Cycles, Op. 20/1, B, chbr orch, op.20/2, S, chbr orch, 1927
- 10 Songs, Op. 25, 1v, pf, 1930
- Herbst, cantata, text by Morgenstern, Op. 36, S, pf trio, 1932
- Das ewige Brausen, text by K. L. Hamsun, Op. 46, B, orch, 1936
- Der Sonntag, cantata, text by Gotthelf, Op. 63, Mez/Bar, pf trio, 1942
- Magnificat, Op. 64, S, org, 1942, arr. as op.64a, S, str, 1942
- 9 Songs, Op. 70, text by Morgenstern, 1v, pf, 1943
- Und als der Tag der Pfingsten erfüllt war, Op. 84, A/B, org, 1951
- Psalmenmusik, soprano and orchestra, 1953
