= Armin Schibler =

Swiss composer (1920–1986)

Op 90 Monologe for Bassoon & Piano
Performed by Arthur Grossman (12:09)

Armin Schibler (Kreuzlingen am Bodensee, 20 November 1920 – Zurich, 7 September 1986) was a Swiss composer.

== Biography ==
After attending high school in the town of Aarau, he studied music under Walter Frey and Paul Müller in Zurich. From 1942 to 1945, he was the pupil of Willy Burkhard. He later went to England to perfect his training where he would meet notable contemporaries Benjamin Britten, Edmund Rubbra and Michael Tippett. In 1948 and 1953, Schibler attended the Summer Courses at Darmstadt, where he met and worked with Wolfgang Fortner, Ernst Křenek, René Leibowitz and Theodor W. Adorno. From 1944, he was the professor of music at the Zurich Literary School.

== Selected works ==
As a composer of operas, orchestral choirs, Lieder and chamber music, his works are characterized by harmonious pacing and a preference for counterpoint. He also used serial composition.

- Fantasie for viola and chamber orchestra, Op. 15 (1945)
- Der spanische Rosenstock (Le rosier espagnol) (1947–1950), opera in 3 acts after the novel by Werner Bergengruen; libretto by Max Allenspach
- Kleines Konzert for viola solo, Op. 9d (1951)
- Weil alles erneut sich begibt for low voice, viola and piano, Op. 23 (1949)
- Ballade for viola and piano, Op. 54 (1957)
- Klavierkonzert for piano and orchestra, Op. 71 (1961)
- Konzertante Fantasie for alto saxophone and small orchestra, Op. 95 (1978)
