= Santiago Apóstol, Liétor =

Church in Liétor, Spain

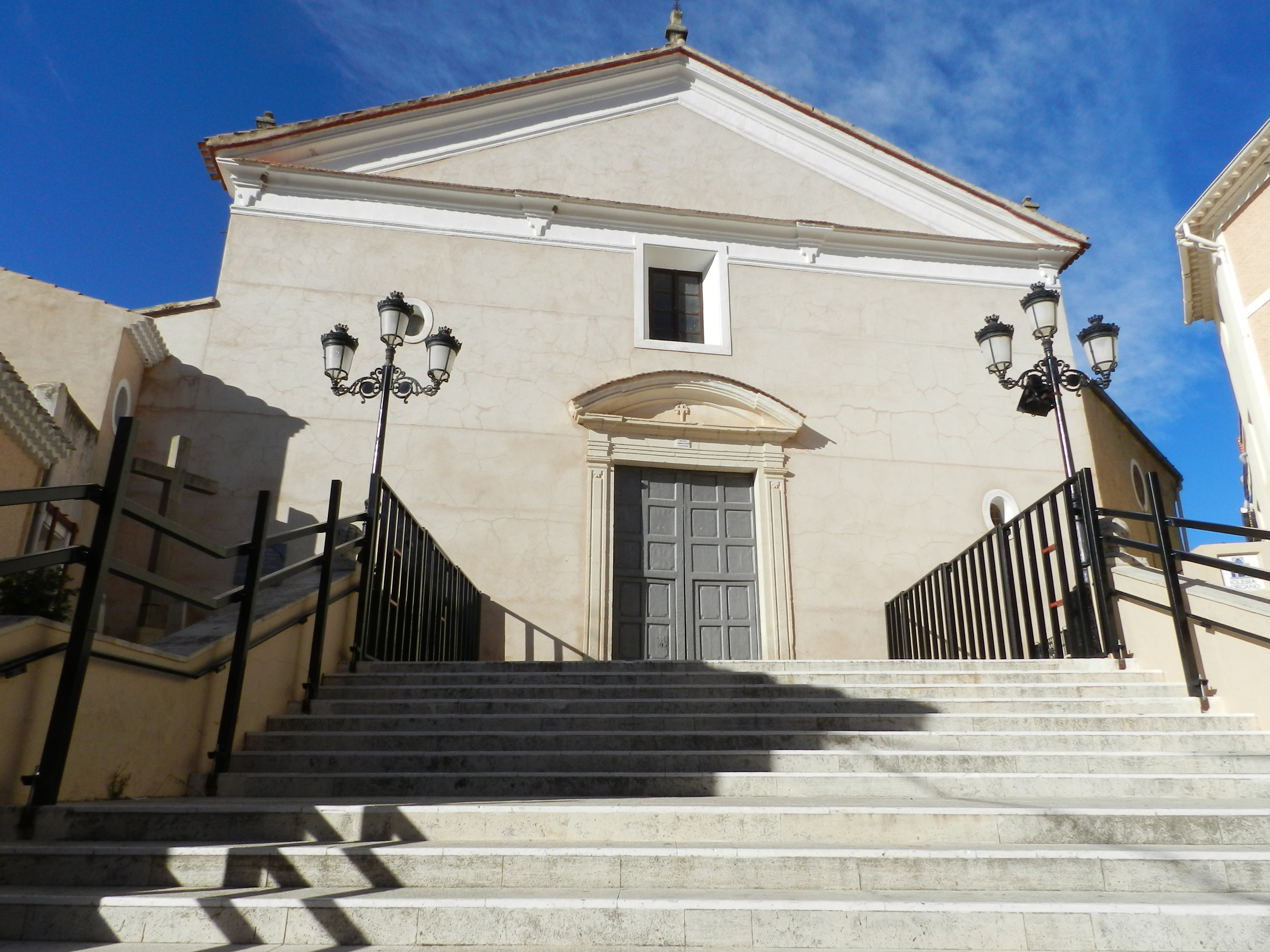
Exterior

Santiago Apóstol (Spanish for 'St James the Apostle') is a Roman Catholic parish church located in Liétor, in the Community of Castilla–La Mancha, Spain.

The church is erected on the site an earlier church present before the 18th century, with a tower probably from the 15th century. The main facade is neoclassical in style with a tympanum displaying the Cross of Saint James. The layout is a traditional Latin Cross with side chapels, and the church contains an 18th-century organ.

Among the chapel altars are those dedicated to:

- Saint Rita (1678)
- The Resurrection (1794)
- Our Lady of the Rosary (1772) with polychrome wooden retablo completed in 1733 by Blas Crespo and an icon of the Virgin of the Rosary (1784) by Joseph López
- Our Lady of Solitude with a retablo (1795) by Paolo Sistori and an image by Roque López
- Immaculate Conception with a 17th-century retablo derived from the former convent of the Carmelite nuns
- Our Lady of the Carmelites also with an retablo derived from the former convent of the Carmelite nuns
- Virgin of Hope with image by Salcillo
- Father Jesus with 18th-century retablo with an image of Christ by José Sánchez Lozano
- Saint Joseph with retablo from 1773 carved by Matías Reolid with image (1862) by Eusebio Baglietto
- Saint Cajetan
- Saint Antony Abbot

Other works in the church include the main altar (1795) by Paolo Sistori and the Retablo de Nuestra Señora del Espino (1730) commissioned by Juan de Valdelvira Belmonte and his wife, Mariana de Tobarra Alcantud, with the image of the Virgin by José Sánchez Lozano. The parish museum contains various works, both Christian and ancient, from the region.
