= Convent and church of Carmelitas =

- Convento de Carmelitas y la Iglesia (Spanish)
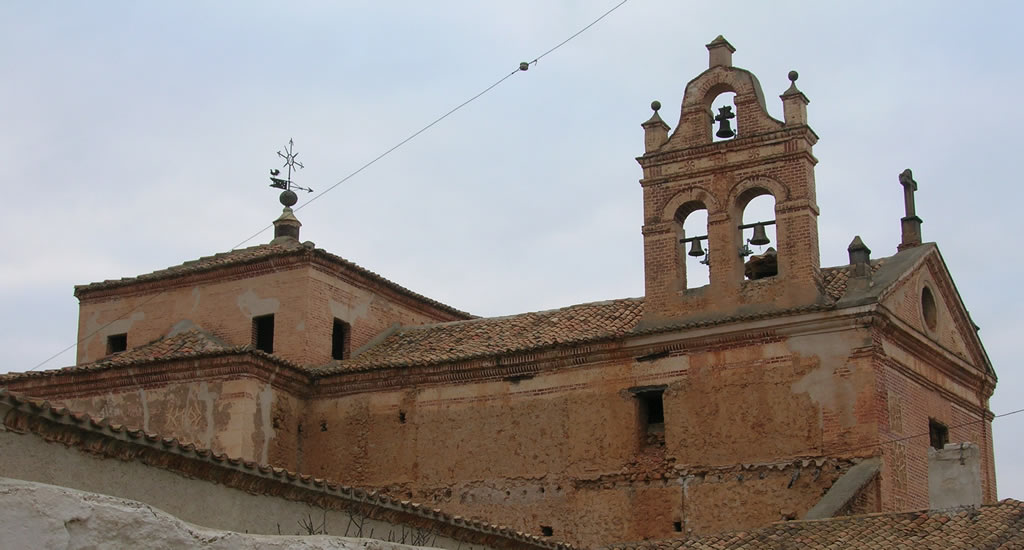

- Location within Spain
- 38.540546°N 1.952667°W
- Location: Liétor, Spain

Spanish Cultural Heritage
- Official name: Convento de Carmelitas y la Iglesia
- Type: Non-movable
- Criteria: Monument
- Designated: 1981
- Reference no.: RI-51-0004517

The Convent and church of Carmelitas (Spanish: Convento de Carmelitas y la Iglesia) is a convent located in Liétor, Spain. It was declared Bien de Interés Cultural in 1981.
