= Die Sintflut =

Cantata composed by Willy Burkhard

- Sacred cantata by Willy Burkhard
- Opus: 97
- Text: Book of Genesis, 6:9–9:17
- Language: German
- Composed: 1954–55
- Movements: 5
- Scoring: SATB choir in eight parts

Die Sintflut (The Flood), Op. 97, is a cantata (Kantate) for eight-part unaccompanied choir by Willy Burkhard, on a German text based on the Biblical story of Noah and the flood, composed in 1954/55.

== History, text and music ==
Burkhard composed the setting of Biblical text from the Book of Genesis, 6:9–9:17, in German in 1954 and 1955 when he lived and taught in Zürich. It was intended for the Berner Kammerchor. The composition was to be his penultimate work. It was published by Bärenreiter, first in 1955 and last in 2003, then subtitled "Kantate nach dem Bericht aus dem ersten Buch Mose / für gemischten Chor a cappella" (Cantata after the record from the First Book of Moses / for mixed choir a cappella).

== Text and music ==
Burkhard wrote the text following the Biblical account, slightly shortening it and inserting some repetitions. He was drawn to it as a story which fascinated him by both its general statement (überpersönliche Aussage) and language full of imagery but without fixed metre. He organized the work in five movements:

- I Die Verderbtheit des Menschengeschlechts (The depravity of man)
- II Die Berufung Noahs (The calling of Noah)
- III Der Ausbruch der Sintflut (The outbreak of the Flood)
- IV Der Sintflut Ende (The end of the Flood)
- V Gottes Bund mit Noah und der Regenbogen (God's covenant with Noah, and the rainbow)

The music uses several means of a cappella singing, such as homophony, imitation, and recitative of the choir (Chorrezitativ). Burkhard followed the diction of the text by precise rhythmical notation. He used word painting to depict the waters and the rainbow. The final movement is structured as a passacaglia on an ostinato bass, which is repeated seven times. The rainbow is depicted by harmony beginning in the lowest voice, rising in upward motifs to the highest, while the lower voices keep singing, and returning in downward motifs to the lowest while the upper voices fade out.

== Performances and recordings ==
The Fifth International Congress of Church Music (5. Internationaler Kongress für Kirchenmusik) in Berne in 2015 programmed Die Sintflut as part of a vespers service, performed by the Berner Kantorei conducted by Johannes Günther.

It was recorded by the Engadiner Kantorei conducted by Martin Flämig.
