= Karl Hochreither =

German organist, conductor and music educator

Karl Hochreither (27 October 1933 – 23 October 2018) was a German organist, conductor, music educator and musicologist.

== Life ==
Born in Speyer, the son of a carpenter made his first musical experiences as a choir singer under the elementary school teacher and honorary church musician Adolf Graf, who ensured that the gifted boy received a good education on the piano and introduced him to church music in organ lessons, church choir and theory lessons. Hochreither attended the natural science department of the Staatliches Gymmasium Speyer (altsprachlich und naturwissenschaftlich), the present Gymnasium am Kaiserdom. After his Abitur in 1952 he studied German language and literature, history and philosophy at the Albert-Ludwigs-Universität Freiburg and afterwards church music at the Hochschule für Musik Detmold, where he became a student of Michael Schneider, with whom he had a lifelong friendship. After completing his studies, Hochreither began working as a cantor in 1959 in Speyer in the office for church music of the Evangelical Church of the Palatinate, which was led by his mentor Graf, who had meanwhile been appointed director of church music. Originally intended as Graf's successor, he moved to the Spandauer Kirchenmusikschule in 1963 as a lecturer for artistic organ playing and taught there until his retirement in 1998. From 1964 to 2001, he was the successor of Hanns-Martin Schneidt and Helmuth Rilling and directed the [Bach-Chor_an_der_Kaiser-Wilhelm-Gedaechtniskirche] in Berlin and the Kirchenmusik at the Hochschule für Musik Detmold.

As organist and conductor his concert tours have taken him all over the world. Since the end of the sixties he has been working abroad as an educator. As Artist in Residence he was a guest of the University of Western Ontario in Canada and the "Asian Institute for Liturgy and Music" in Manila. From 1997 to 2007 he was artistic director of the Bach Festival in Grand Rapids, Michigan.

In addition to his musical and pedagogical activities, he was also active as an author, especially on topics concerning the composer Johann Sebastian Bach. In 1993, the Governing Mayor of Berlin awarded him the title "Professor e.h." in recognition of his "outstanding cultural services to Berlin". In 2002 he was awarded the Verdienstorden der Bundesrepublik Deutschland.

Hochreiter died at the age of 85 in Berlin. His grave is located at the Friedhöfe vor dem Halleschen Tor.

== Publications ==
- Karl Hochreither: Zur Aufführungspraxis der Vokal-Instrumentalwerke Johann Sebastian Bachs. 183 pages with 7 illustrations, 27 facsimiles and 26 music samples. Verlag Merseburger, Kassel
- Rudolf Elvers and Karl Hochreither (ed.): Bach-Kantaten in Berlin – eine Jubiläumsschrift im Auftrag des Bach-Chores an der Kaiser-Wilhelm-Gedächtnis-Kirche. CZV-Verlag, Berlin
- Karl Hochreither: Ernst Peppings Toccata und Fuge „Mitten wir im Leben sind“. In Heinrich Poos (ed.): Festschrift Ernst Pepping zu seinem 70. Geburtstag am 12. September 1971. Verlag Merseburger, Berlin 1971.
- Karl Hochreither: Epilog. In Gerda Graf [Red.], Hans Graf, Martin Graf (ed.): Leben und Wirken von Adolf Graf 14.7.1899 – 4.11.1978. Karl Stock, Annweiler am Trifels 1979. Without pagination.

== Recordings ==
- Franz Liszt: Werke für Orgel. Contents:

– Präludium und Fuge über den Namen B-A-C-H (2nd version). – Évocation à la Chapelle Sistine (cooperation): 1. Gregorio Allegri: Miserere. 2. Wolfgang Amadeus Mozart: Ave verum corpus. – Jakob Acadelt: Ave Maria (cooperation). – Variationen über den basso continuo des 1. Satzes der Kantate Weinen, Klagen, Sorgen, Zagen und des Crucifixus aus der h-moll Messe von Johann Sebastian Bach.

(LP EMI ELECTROLA, Köln 1974, Stereo 33 Nr. 29 0735 1 A/1B. Karl Hochreither at the Rieger-Orgel der St. Jakobskirche zu Rothenburg o. T. Recording 11 – 13 December 1973. Productor: Gerd Berg. Tonmeister: Johann-Nikolaus Matthes)

- Johann Sebastian Bach: Kantaten BWV 11, 51, 56, 82, 172, Motetten BWV 225–230. Einzelheiten unter: bach-cantatas.com
