= Neustädter Kirche, Hanover =

Church in Hanover, Lower Saxony

Neustädter Kirche St. Johannis
- Neustädter Hof- und Stadtkirche St. Johannis zu Hannover
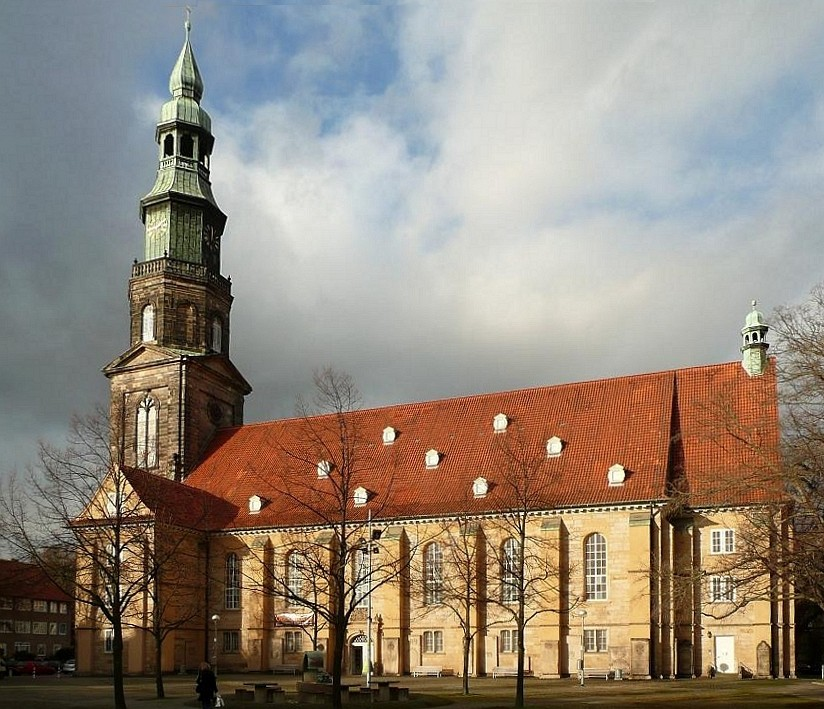
- Neustädter Kirche, 2009
- New Town Church and the approximate location of the former 13th-century defensive wall encircling the old town (●) within the 17th-century inner bastion (●).
- 52°22′16″N 9°43′43″E
- Location: Hanover
- Country: Germany
- Denomination: Lutheran
- Website: hofundstadtkirche.org

Architecture
- Architect: Girolamo Sartorio?
- Architectural type: Aisleless church
- Style: Baroque
- Groundbreaking: 1666
- Completed: 1670

Administration
- Diocese: Sprengel Hannover
- Deanery: Hanover City (Stadtkirchenverband)
- Parish: Kirchengemeinde der Hof- und Stadtkirche, Hanover

The New Town Church (German: Neustädter Kirche) is a main Lutheran parish church in Hanover, Germany. Its official name is St. John's Church of the court and city in the New Town at Hanover (Neustädter Hof- und Stadtkirche St. Johannis zu Hannover). The Baroque church was built in 1666–70 and is one of the oldest Protestant aisleless churches (Saalkirchen) in Lower Saxony, conceived for the sermon as the main act of the Lutheran church service. Mathematician and philosopher Gottfried Wilhelm Leibniz and Field Marshal Carl August von Alten are buried here.

The church is known for its church music, performed in service and concert by St. John's chorale (Kantorei St. Johannis), and serves as a venue for concerts, for example in the context of the Expo 2000 and the German Evangelical Church Assembly (Kirchentag). In collaboration with the Hanover University of Music, Drama and Media, an organ called Spanish organ that reflects principles of Spanish Baroque organ building without copying a specific instrument (and which is thus suitable for early Baroque music) was installed on the north balcony of the church in 1998–2001.

== History ==
The church is the successor of a castle chapel of St. Gall, founded by the Counts of Lauenrode for their castle, first mentioned in 1241 as the Gaulish Church (Latin: ecclesia Galli). After the destruction of the castle during the Lüneburg War of Succession, a new chapel was built before 1388 by Cord van Alten on the Rosmarinhof within the Hanover town walls, close to the present location of the church. It was dedicated to Mary (beatissime Marie Virginis). In 1396, Bishop Otto of Minden made it the Kollegiat- und Pfarrkirche (collegiate and parish church) of the Calenberger Neustadt, the new part of the town south of the Leine. The church became Lutheran in 1533.

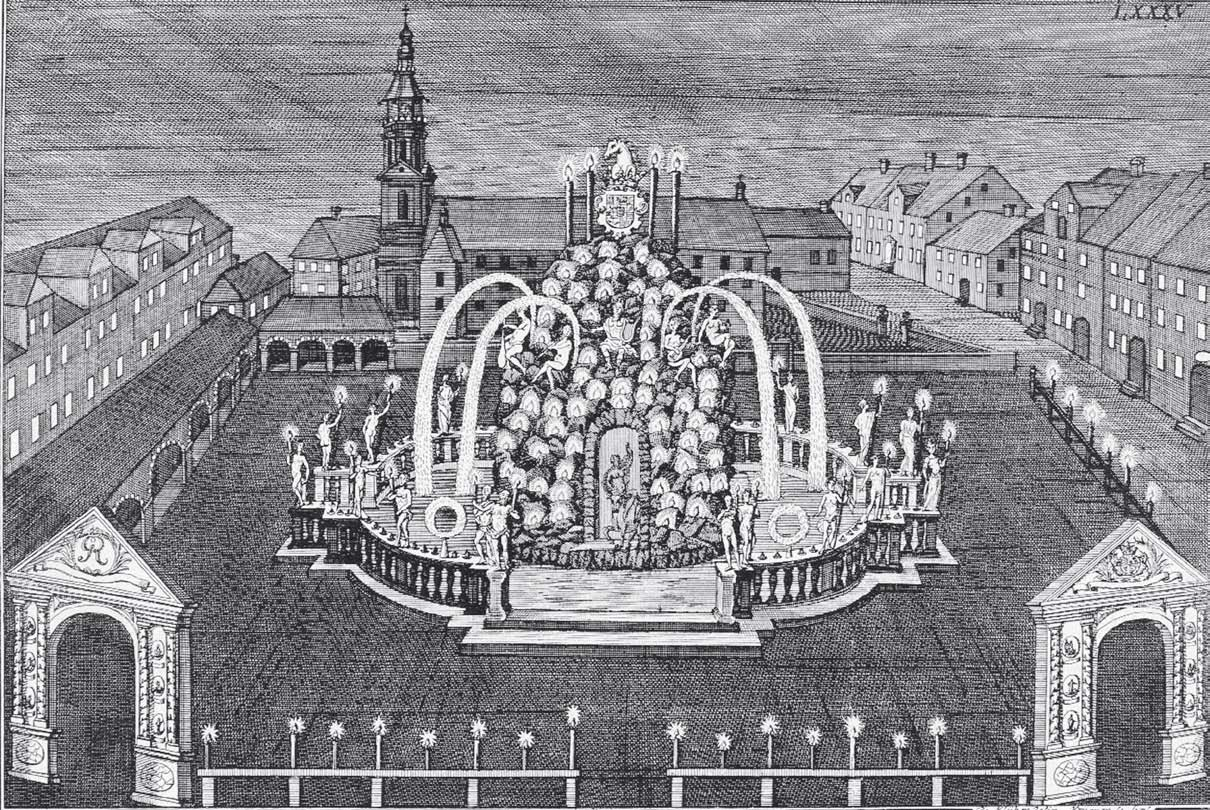
Neustädter Markt with the Parnaßbrunnen fountain, also designed by Sartorio, steel engraving by Johann Anton de Klyher, 1727

John Frederick, Duke of Brunswick-Lüneburg, converted to Catholicism in 1651. When he took over the Principality of Calenberg in 1665, the court chapel in the Leineschloss was converted to Catholic, and the Protestant members of the court needed a new church. It was built from 1666 to 1670 in the Calenberger Neustadt, across the Leine from the Altstadt (old town), across the river from the Leineschloss, then the courtly residence. The church was designed in Baroque style, probably by the Venetian architect Girolamo Sartorio, the duke's Bauverwalter, who didn't follow models but built a hall focused on the sermon. The architect was the duke's Hofbauschreiber Brand Westermann. The building was financed by the duke and the representatives of the Principality of Calenberg, and to a large extent by the early capitalist merchant and banker John Duve. Material from a former chapel of St. Gall in the old town was reused. The church was the burial site for members of the court.

Since the original tower was in danger of collapsing, a new tower was erected above the west portal from 1691 to 1700. The landmark has a square base, an octagonal upper floor and a copper-roofed cupola with lantern and apex.

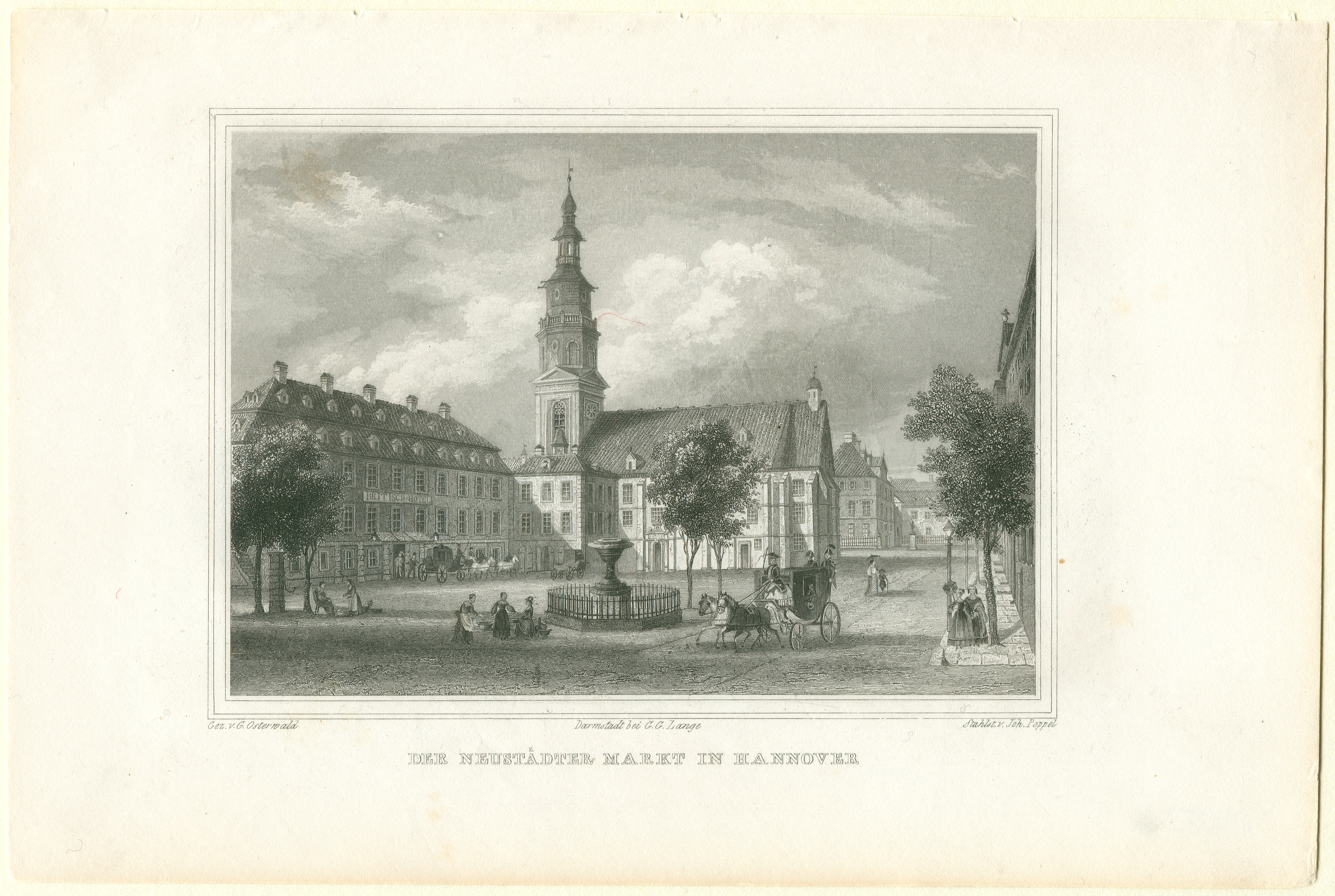
Neustädter Markt, 1850, steel engraving by John Poppel after a drawing by George Osterwald

The Neustädter Kirche was until 1936 the church of the General Superintendent. Johann Adolf Schlegel was superintendent from 1775 until his death in 1793.

In World War II, air raids heavily damaged the church; only the exterior walls remained. A reconstruction was carried out 1956–58 in simple form, led by Wilhelm Ziegeler.

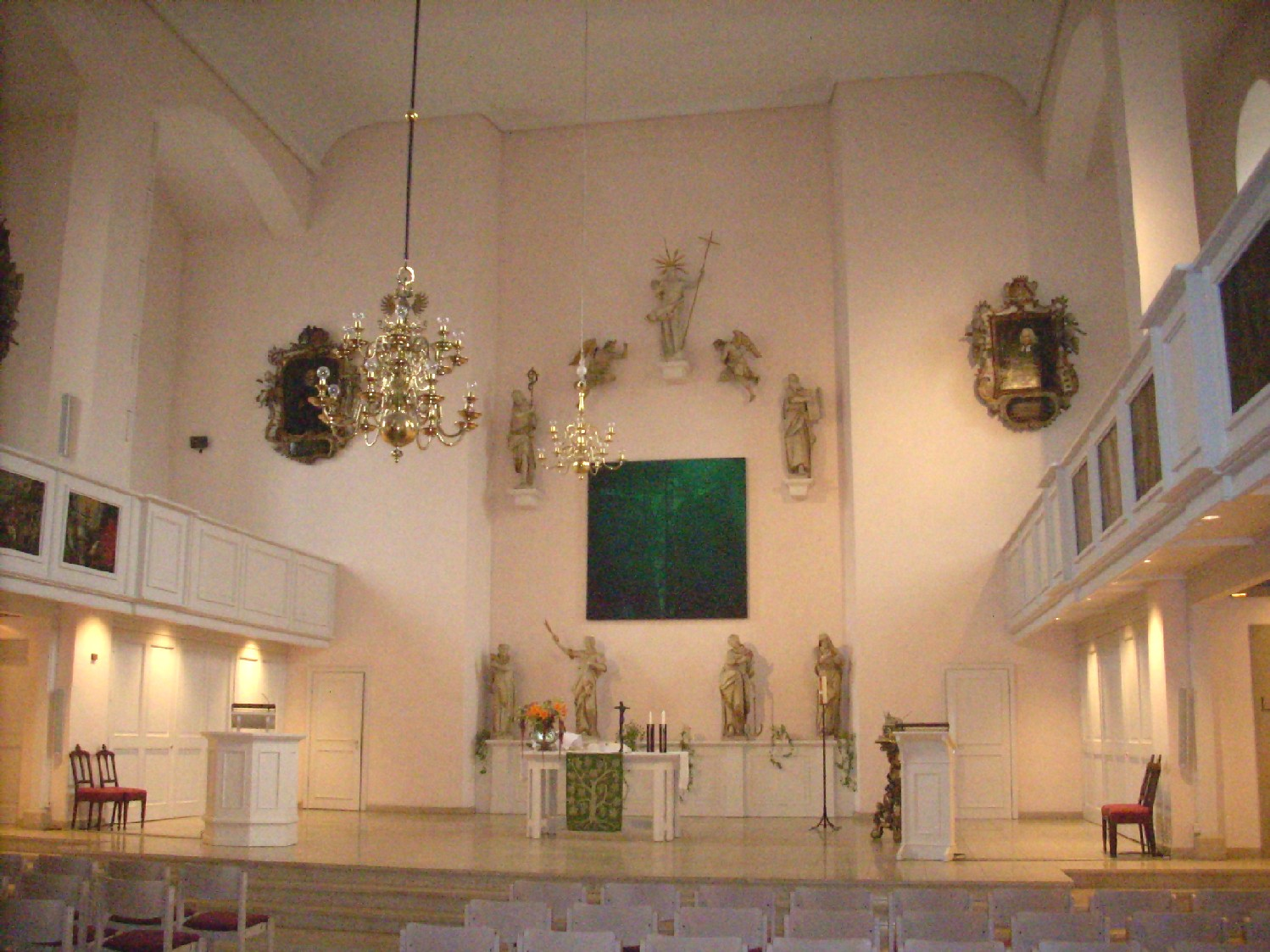
Interior, 2007

A renovation of the interior 1992/94 was closer to the original concept and restored some of the surviving Baroque features. The Baroque interior was not restored completely, but preserved parts of the original furnishings; statues and images of Christ, angels, and saints, as well as allegorical figures, portraits, and monuments, were combined and rearranged with modern elements.

== Architecture ==
The Neustädter Kirche shows the characteristics of a rigorous early Baroque style, still based on antique models. It is one of the oldest Protestant Saalkirche (Aisleless church) in Lower Saxony, conceived for the sermon as the main act of Lutheran church service. It is a long and spacious hall church, which closes to the east with a slightly narrower chancel. It has a large organ balcony to the west and small balconies along the south and north sides. The rich interior decoration was mostly lost in World War II.

== Epitaphs ==
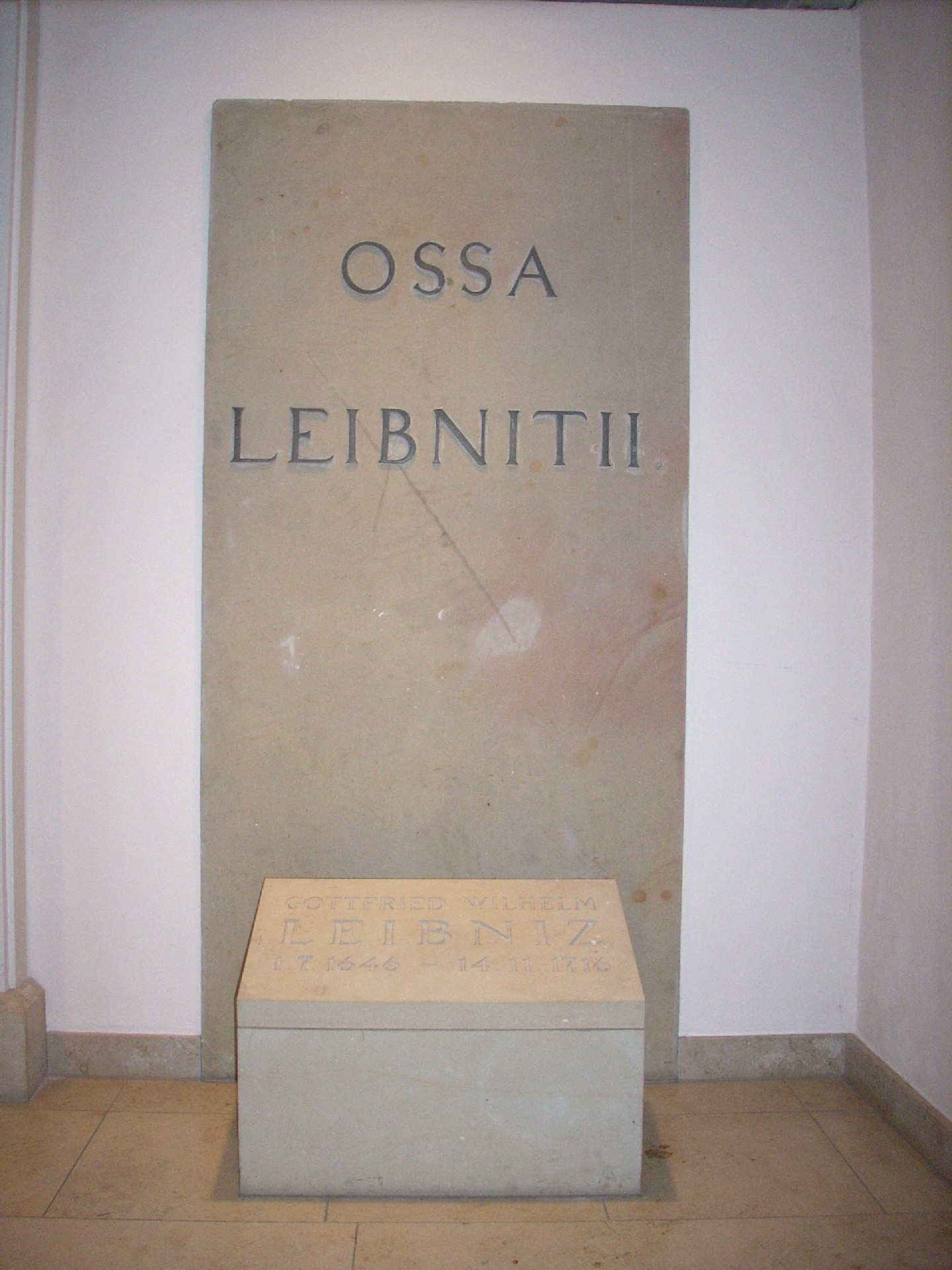
Epitaph of Gottfried Wilhelm Leibniz

Since 1902, epitaphs and tombstones which originally covered the floor of the church completely, were placed on the exterior walls, in memory of court officials, court ministers and superintendents with their families. The most important burial sites remained inside, including those of Gottfried Wilhelm Leibniz who was buried on 14 December 1716, and general Carl August von Alten (1840).

== Organs ==
On the west balcony, a main organ was installed in 1963 by Detlef Kleuker with three manuals and 38 stops. In 2010, the organ was beyond repair and was sold. A new main organ is planned. A temporary movable organ serves in the church.

A second organ, called Spanische Orgel (Spanish organ), was installed on the north balcony 1998–2001 by Patrick Collon (Belgium). It reflects principles of Spanish Baroque organ building without copying a specific instrument. One model is the organ from the 17th century of the Iglesia Colegial in Lerma close to Burgos, other models are in churches in Covarrubias and in Liétor.

This organ belongs not to the parish, but to the Hochschule für Musik und Theater Hannover, serving students in classes and master classes. At present this organ is the only Spanish Baroque organ in Germany and is used for concerts and services.

== Church music ==
The church is known for its church music, performed in service and concert by the choir Kantorei St. Johannis, founded in 1958. It serves as a venue for concerts, for example in the context of the Expo 2000 and the Kirchentag.

When the church was restored after World War II, a service was held on the first Sunday of Advent, performing Bach's cantata BWV 61, conducted by Kantor Werner Burckhardt. The church choir was named Kantorei on this occasion. Burckhardt was succeeded in 1968 by Christhard Vandré. Erhard Egidi was Kantor from 1972 to 1991. All cantors concentrated on music in church services, but also conducted concerts, with a preference of works by Johann Sebastian Bach. Egidi also performed works by his teacher Ernst Pepping and contemporary music. In 1986 he combined Stravinsky's Canticum sacrum and Ein deutsches Requiem by Brahms, in 1988 he conducted Stravinsky's Cantata and Mozart's Great Mass in C minor, in 1990 Bach's Mass in B minor, and in 1991 Bach's St Matthew Passion,

Since 1991, the cantor has been Lothar Mohn. He kept his predecessors' tradition of an annual Passionskonzert (Lenten concert), frequently performing Bach's St Matthew Passion or St John Passion. In 2008 he installed a series of Bach cantatas named "Bach um Fünf" (Bach at five), beginning with Sie werden aus Saba alle kommen, BWV 65.

== Literature ==
- Wolfgang Puschmann: Neustädter Hof- und Stadtkirche St. Johannis, in: Hannovers Kirchen. 140 Kirchen in Stadt und Umland. Wolfgang Puschmann. Hermannsburg. 2005, ps. 12–15. ISBN 3-937301-35-6.
