= Neustädter Kirche, Erlangen =

Church in Erlangen, Germany

Coordinates: 49°35′44″N 11°00′20″E

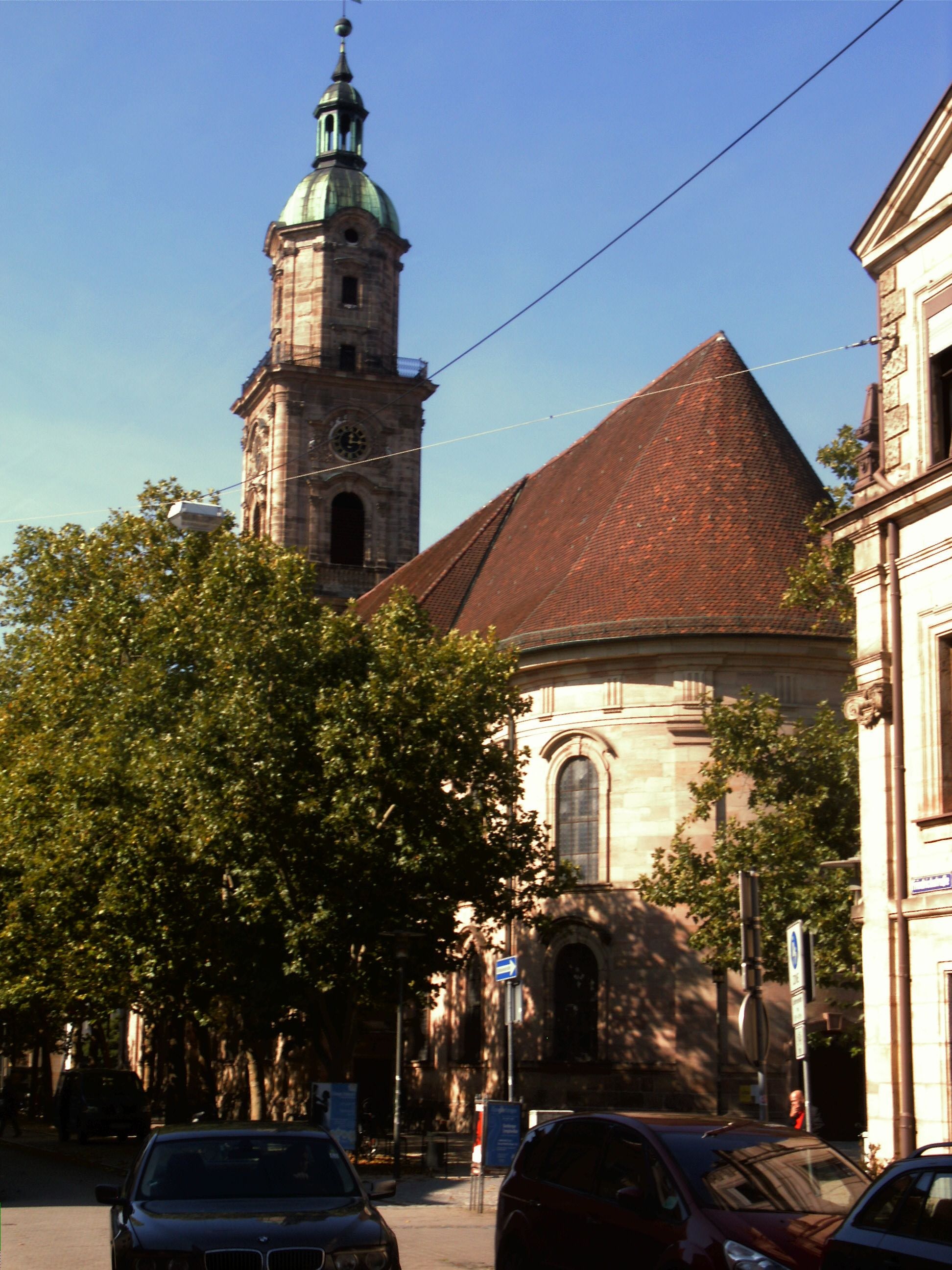
Neustädter Kirche, from the east

Neustädter Kirche ("new town church" in German) is one of three large downtown churches of the Baroque old town of Erlangen. Germany. The church is Lutheran. It dominates the town, together with the Reformed Hugenottenkirche (church of the Huguenots) and the Lutheran Altstädter Kirche (old town church).

== History ==
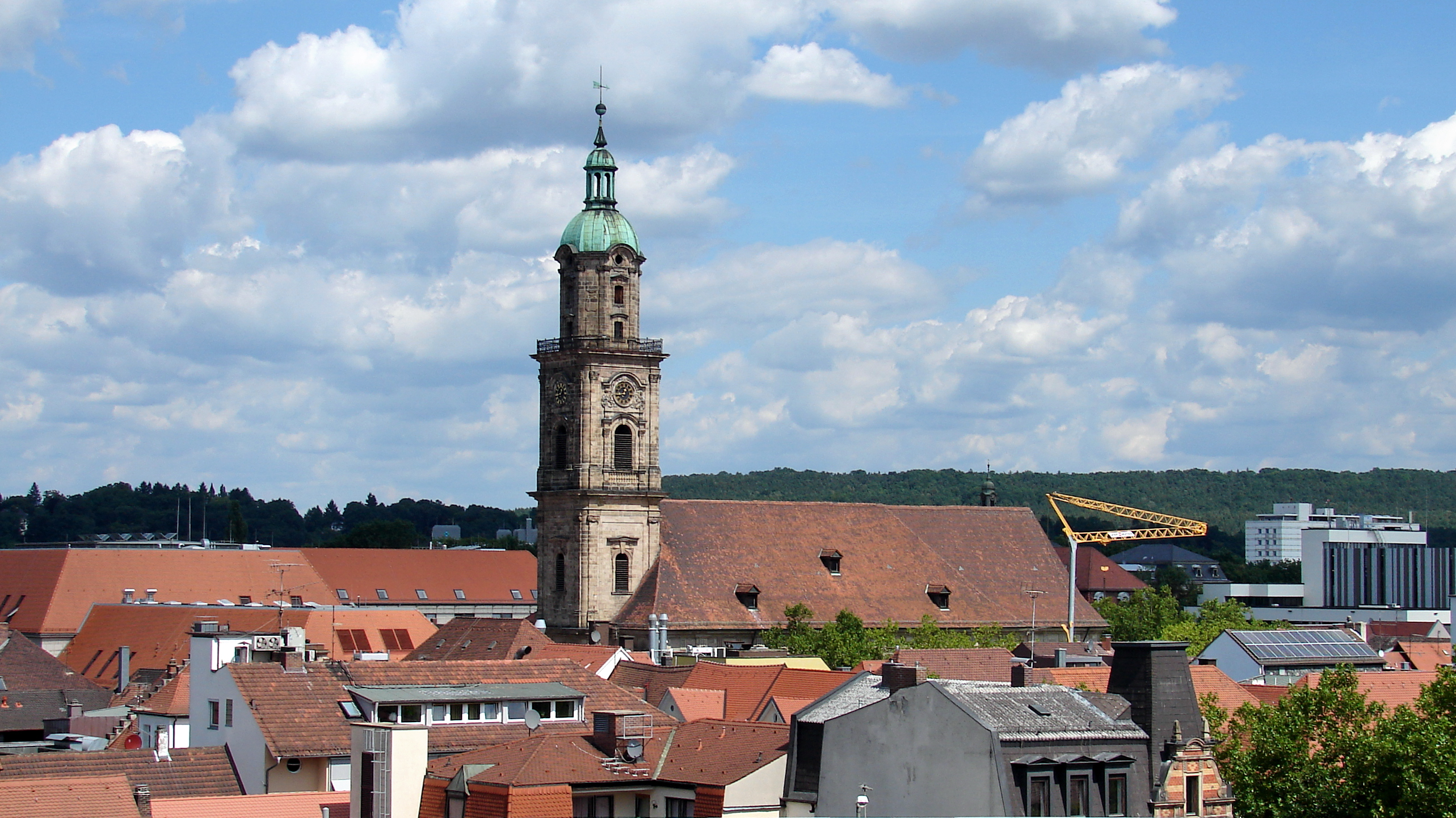
Neustädter Kirche viewed from the Erlangen Arcade (2012)

The decree to build the church was on 22 January 1703 by Margrave Christian Ernst.

The Church was built between 1725 and 1737, for the growing population of Lutheran people in the city.

The Franco-Prussian philosopher of law and conservative politician Friedrich Julius Stahl, later professor at the University of Erlangen, was baptised here on 6 November 1819. During World War II the church was severely damaged by bombs and rebuilt in 1955.

The organ was rebuilt in 2005.

== Architecture ==
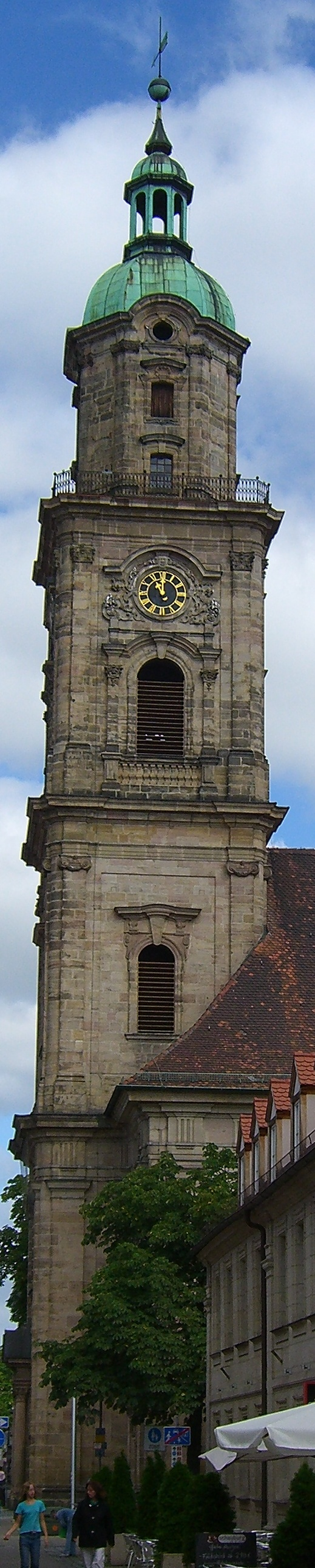
Tower of the church

The architecture of the church is the Old Church and Church of the Huguenots a unit. This is evident already at the location. Although all three churches are on the typical east-west axis, only the two Lutheran churches (Church of Old Town, New Town Church) always faces east, so constructed with the choir in the east. Its tower stands on the west side of the church.

A striking feature of the facade is primarily the pillar system, which combines all three major inner city churches. Looking at the tower, it is found that it is divided into four. It can be found at its four corners from bottom to top: Doric capitals, Ionic capitals and Corinthian capitals. It is then one viewing platform at the center is then a small octagonal tower attachment.

The Church was designed by Wenzel Perner, with "Ceiling frescoes by Christian and Karl Georg Leinberger".

=== Organ ===
The history of church organs in the New Town dates back to the year 1741, when Johann Glis (Nuremberg) built the first instrument with 31 registers.

The present organ was created in 2004 and 2005 by the organ builder Goll (Lucerne / Switzerland), historical re-using existing structures. The instrument has 45 stops and three transmissions on three manuals and pedal. The disposition was created based on the Franco-baroque sound of Glis-organs. The Spieltrakturen are mechanical. The mechanical stop actions are equipped with electromagnets. Manual on the second chorus, the organ is playable, which is located behind the high altar. This instrument was built with 20 registers of the organ builder GF Steinmeyer & Co. (Oettingen) in 1919.
