= Liétor =

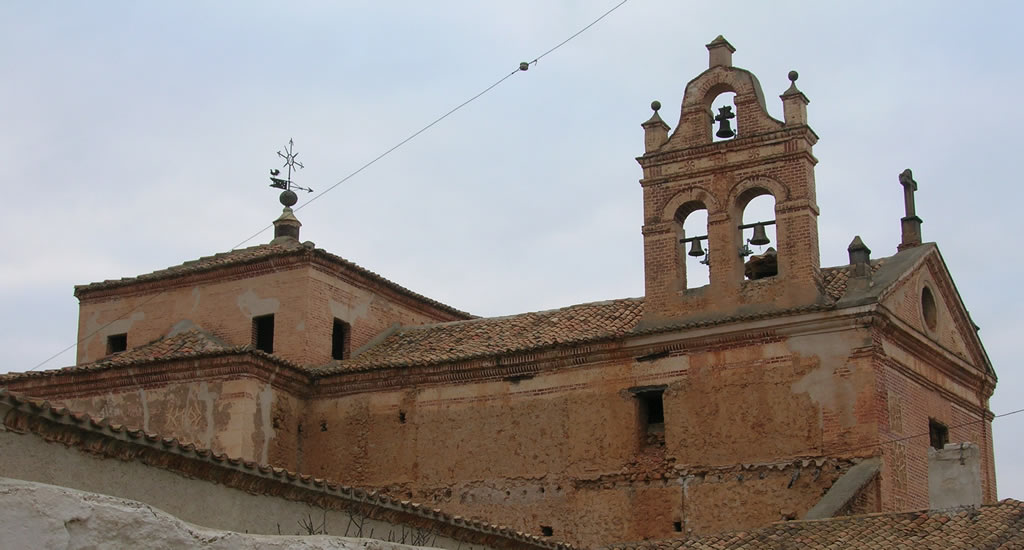

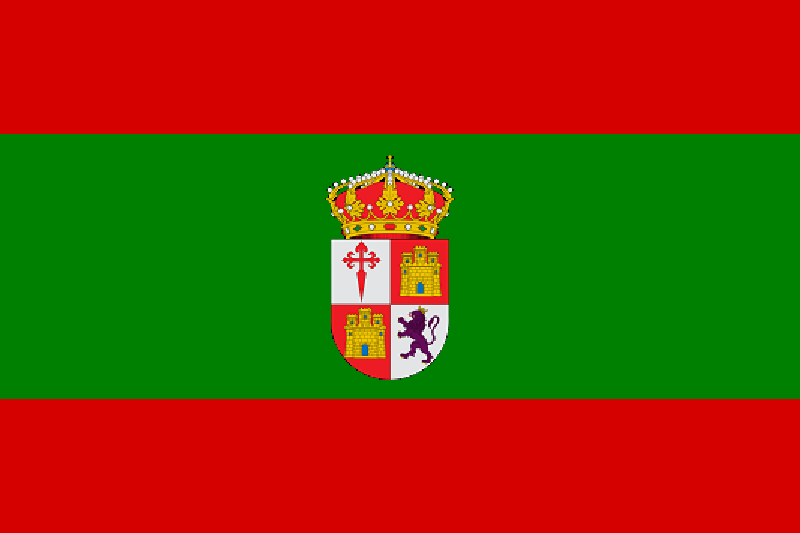
Flag of Liétor

Coat of arms of Liétor

Liétor (Spanish pronunciation: [ˈlje.toɾ]) is a municipality in Albacete, Castile-La Mancha, Spain, located southeast of the Iberian peninsula, in the valley of the "Mundo" river. It has a population of 1,279 inhabitants (according to INE data for 2016). It comprises the districts of Cañada de Tobarra, Casablanca, El Ginete, Híjar, Mullidar, Talave and La Alcadima.

Among its temples is the church of Santiago Apostol.

== History ==
Already in the pre-Roman times, small settlements of population and limited economic importance are found in the valley of the Mundo river. However, the urban nucleus on which the population later settled during the Middle Ages did not exist as such.

Liétor emerged during the Islamic period of al-Andalus. The exact date of its foundation is not known, but it is estimated that it occurred around the tenth century. The archeological findings of "Los Infiernos" site prove the importance of Liétor as a border settlement during the Christian Reconquest.These items reflect a period of Muslim occupation in which the population was part of the border with the Christian kingdoms. The Arab knight whose objects were found in Los Infiernos, was probably spending long seasons warring and defending the territories of al-Andalus or trying to annex new ones.

After the Reconquest, at the beginning of the 13th century, the monarch Fernando III donated the town to the Order of Santiago, an administrative unit that would last until the mid-nineteenth century.

In the last third of the 15th century, a number of knights ("caballeros de cuantía") moved into the village. It was their occupation to wage war and control the borders with neighboring Muslim kingdoms, and in exchange they were exempt from a large part of the taxes which they would have had to otherwise pay to the coffers of the "encomienda" (administrative unit).

== Heritage ==
Apart from its beautiful natural location, three monuments stand out, all of them declared of "Bienes de Interés Cultural" ("Heritage of cultural interest", a category of the heritage register in Spain):

=== Church of Santiago Apóstol ===
The church of Santiago Apóstol was declared of Cultural Interest on 22 December 1992.

Located in the Plaza Mayor (Major Square), the temple was probably raised on the site of another medieval building, from which only the tower is preserved. The aforementioned tower is estimated to have been constructed in the late fifteenth or early sixteenth century. This squared tower is a solid construction of ashlar, with gargoyles in the corners.

Inside the temple we find the "Espino" chapel, founded in 1669 by Don Juan de Vandelvira and his wife, Dona Mariana de Tovarra; which consists of a large space covered with dome and a large altarpiece in the background, dating from the year 1720.

The general construction of the temple was undertaken in the second half of the eighteenth century. The church consists of Latin cross floor plan, three naves, enclosed chapels and a flat head. This expansion conducted in the 18th century was planned due to the increase of population of the town, which was in need of a larger parish.

Among the artistic works preserved in the temple is the main altarpiece with a simulated perspective of the main chapel, which is a work by the Italian Paolo Sistori. The church also has a magnificent baroque organ, with a wooden box in rococo style, made in 1787 by the master Joseph Lopis. There is also an important imagery collection: works by Francisco Salzillo (Dolorosa and Esperanza), Roque López (Our Lady of Soledad), Baglieto (San José) or José Sánchez Lozano (Our Father Jesus).

=== Convent and church of Carmelitas Descalzos ===
The Convent (and the church) of the Carmelites was declared of Cultural Interest on 18 September 1981.

The former convent of the Carmelites was founded in honor of St. John of the Cross in 1679, under the reign of Charles II. The work of the building was designed by some friar of the Order and built entirely in brick. During the confiscation of Mendizábal in 1835, the friars were expelled, and since then the convent has remained uninhabited. At present, the building is used to host different cultural events.

The convent church has a Latin cross floor plan, with a dome. The facade was built in the year 1700 as it appears in an inscription. Inside the temple, there is a sculpture of the Virgen del Carmen, attributed to the imager Francisco Salzillo. The main altarpiece was moved to Murcia in the 19th century, where it was destroyed during the Spanish Civil War.

The convent section was built in 1696 and has painted decoration that imitates bricks. In the crypt, which is open for public visits, the remains of some mummies are preserved.

=== Hermitage of Our Lady of Bethlehem ===
The hermitage of Our Lady of Bethlehem was declared a Property of Cultural Interest on 5 March 1976.

The hermitage of Our Lady of Bethlehem has a very simple rectangular floor plan, with arches of diaphragm and wooden cover. Its interest, above all, lies in the great pictorial cycle that adorns all its corners with very peculiar popular paintings, made between 1734 and 1735.

Everything is painted, altarpieces, curtains, illusory architectures, in a naive and colorful line within the best popular aesthetic. Stylistically these murals are filled with enchanting archaisms and imperfections, but it is perhaps that which gives it a remarkable charm. Here, murals include saints, scenes, decoration, even the allegory of death, sometimes accompanied by exemplary sentences and verses. The front comprises three panels, occupied by paintings of the Visitation, the Holy Family and the Immaculate.

Many other painted altarpieces fill the inner space of the hermitage, of which it is worthy to highlight the one of San Antonio and the one of Santa Bárbara.
