= Jesus und Nikodemus =

Sacred 1937 motet by Ernst Pepping

- Evangelienmotette für vierstimmigen Chor a cappella
- Motet by Ernst Pepping
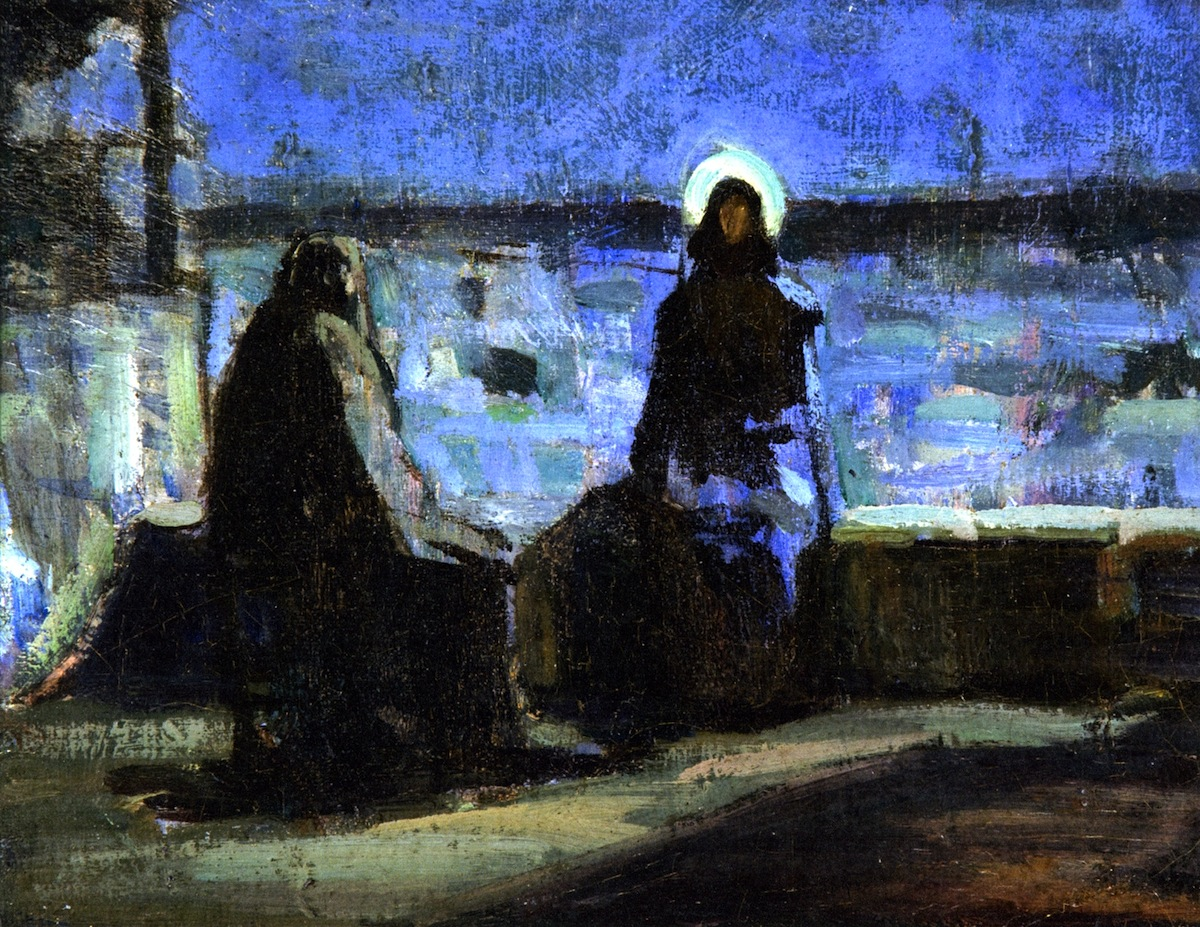
- Christ and Nicodemus, the scene of the gospel
- English: Jesus and Nicodemus, gospel motet for four-part choir a capella
- Form: Motet
- Text: John 3:1–15
- Language: German
- Composed: 1937
- Published: 1938
- Scoring: SATB choir

Jesus und Nikodemus (Jesus and Nicodemus) is a sacred motet by Ernst Pepping, a setting of a passage from the Gospel of John. Pepping composed in 1937 an Evangelienmotette für vierstimmigen Chor a cappella, a motet on gospel text for four-part choir a cappella.

== Topic ==
The topic is the meeting of Jesus and Nicodemus at night (John 3, John 3:1–15). While some believe that Nicodemus, a member of the Sanhedrin who will later contribute to the funeral of Jesus, came to meet Jesus at night because he wanted not to be seen with him, others think that he wanted to concentrate in the silence of the night. The two men discuss the necessity to be born again in the Spirit.

== Background and music ==
Pepping was a composer who relied on Baroque models but wrote severe works with "uncompromising dissonance" in the 1920s. An able teacher with ties to the Confessing Church, he wrote more compromising music in the 1930s and was "left alone" by the Nazis. Afterwards, he was first regarded as a composer who had not distanced himself enough from the Nazis, as also Johann Nepomuk David and Hugo Distler. Their importance for musical innovations was neglected for a long time, as a 2013 concert program showed, "Von Kaminski bis Pepping / Kirchenmusik im Spannungsfeld der 1930er Jahre" (From Kaminski to Pepping / Church music in the area of tension of the 1930s). It presented the motet in the context of other works by Pepping and compositions by Igor Stravinsky, Ernest Bloch, Erich Wolfgang Korngold, Paul Ben-Haim and Heinrich Kaminski.

Pepping set the biblical text in German, showing "by musical means the sensuality and the expressive emotion of the gospel text ("mit musikalischen Mitteln zugleich die hohe Sinnlichkeit und die expressive Emotionalität des Evangeliumtextes"). The narration is given to the bass, the words of Nicodemus to tenor and bass, the words of Jesus are sung by the full choir. In a time of oppression, Pepping's music offers "the reality of a different, heavenly world" (die Wirklichkeit einer anderen, himmlischen Welt).

== Publication and recordings ==
The motet was published by Schott in 1938. It is No. 1 of Drei Evangelien-Motetten (Three Gospel Motets), the others being No. 2 Gleichnis vom Unkraut "Das Himmelreich gleicht einem Menschen" (Parable of the Weeds) and Gleichnis von der königlichen Hochzeit "Saget den Gästen" (Parable of the royal wedding) for mixed choir (SSATTB).

The motet was recorded in 2006, along with Missa Dona nobis pacem and with other motets, by Berliner Vokalensemble conducted by Bernd Stegmann. It is in the repertory of the Dresdner Kreuzchor, typically performed in vesper services and recorded in 2010 on a collection of works related to the Holy Spirit (Komm, Heiliger Geist) from the Renaissance to contemporary, conducted by Roderich Kreile.

== Sources ==
- Pepping Collection Pepping Society
- Jesus und Nikodemus WorldCat
