= St. Mauritius Church =

Church building in Hildesheim, Germany

Coordinates: 52°08′50″N 9°55′35″E

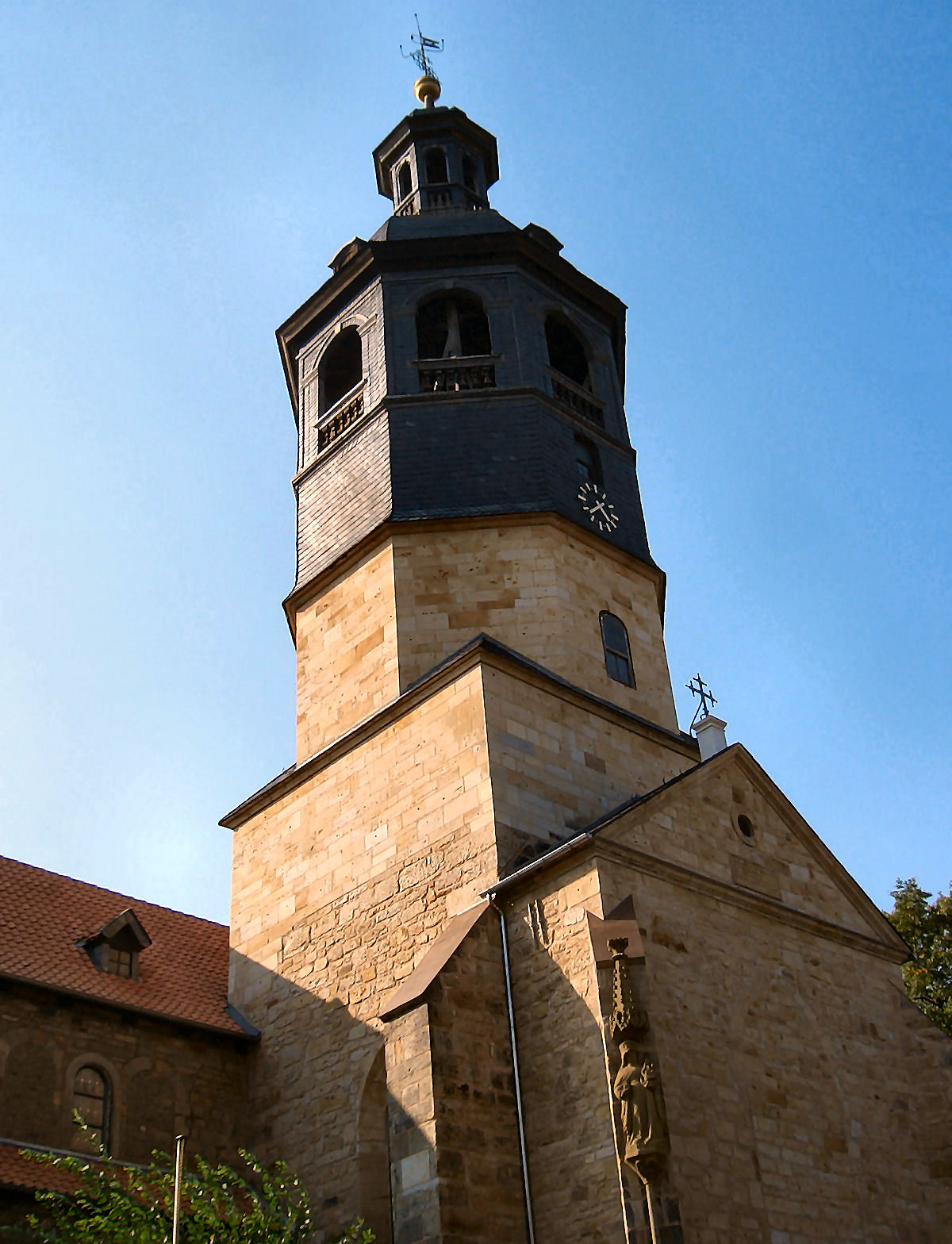
Tower

Stiftskirche St. Mauritius is a Catholic church on the Moritzberg in Hildesheim, Germany. The early Romanesque basilica built in 1058–1072 has been preserved without any major changes. The interior has been Baroque since the 18th century. The cloister is one of the city's most peaceful squares. Under the church is an impressive crypt, also used for church services.
