= Spandauer Kirchenmusikschule =

German school of church music (1929–1998)

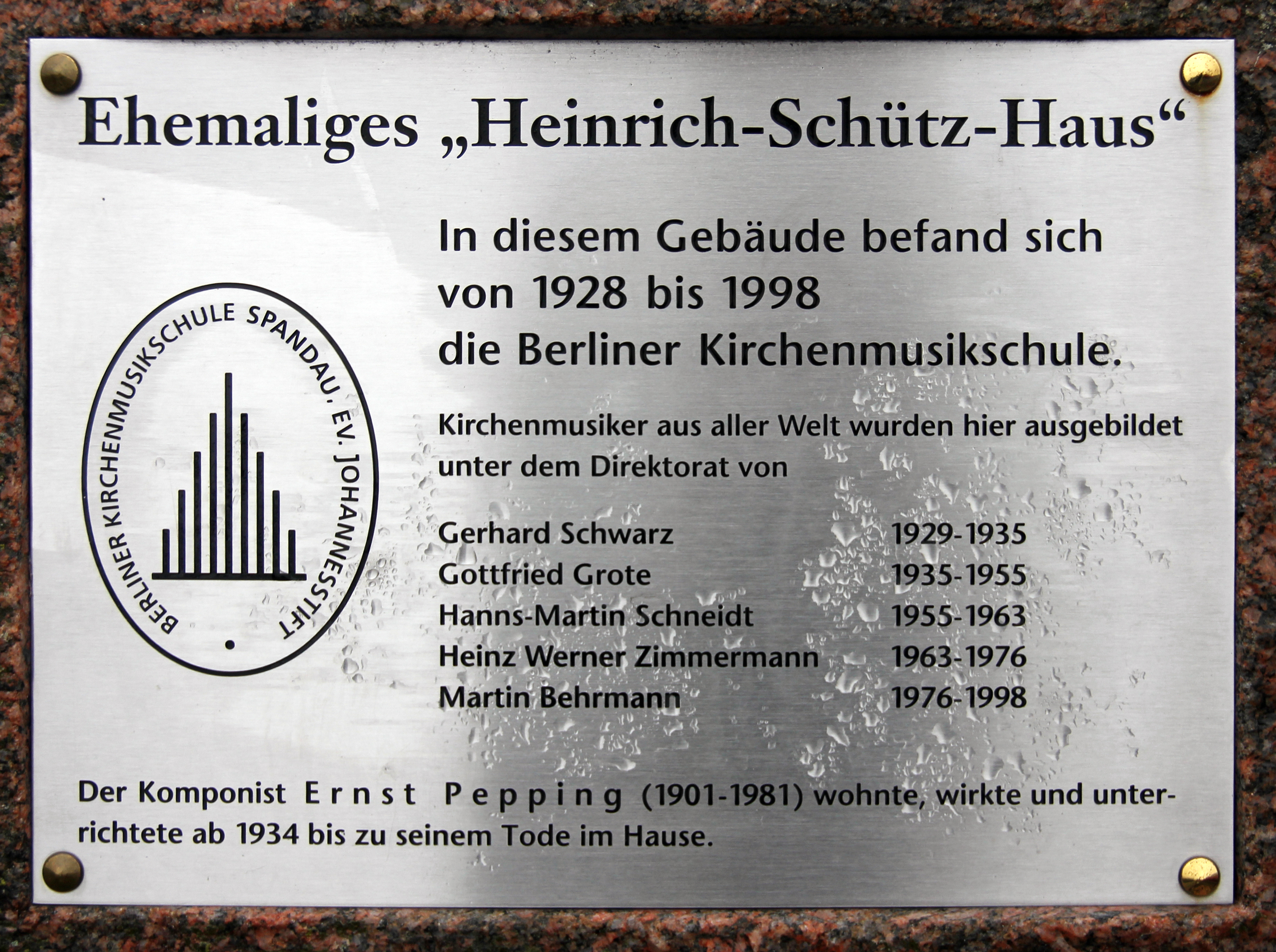
- Plaque with the names of directors at the Janusz-Korczak-Haus in Berlin
- Successor: Berliner Kirchenmusikschule
- Established: 1929
- Founded at: Spandau (now part of Berlin)
- Dissolved: 1998
- Coordinates: 52°34′7″N 13°11′37″E
- Services: Academy of church music
- Key people: Hugo Distler; Gottfried Grote; Ernst Pepping; Helmuth Rilling; Hanns-Martin Schneidt; Heinz Werner Zimmermann

The Spandauer Kirchenmusikschule (Spandau school of church music) was a music academy in Spandau, Berlin, Germany. Founded in 1929, it was housed in the Heinrich-Schütz-Haus in Spandau and was closed in 1998. The schools choir appeared and recorded as the Spandauer Kantorei. It was located in today's Berlin-Hakenfelde, and is also known as Berliner Kirchenmusikschule.

Students of the Spandauer Kirchenmusikschule formed the base of the Spandauer Kantorei (Spandau chorale), a mixed choir which presented numerous concerts and radio broadcasts in Berlin. Notable teachers included composers Hugo Distler, Ernst Pepping, Winfried Radeke and Heinz Werner Zimmermann, his wife Renate Zimmermann, the organists Heinz Lohmann and Karl Hochreither, and the conductor Helmuth Rilling (until 1966). The last director was Martin Behrmann, who published a Handbuch für Chorleitung (manual for choral conducting).

The school was suggested for university status in 1990 because of its excellent reputation, but instead it was dissolved in 1998 and became part of the Musikhochschule Berlin.

== Directors ==
- 1929–1935 Gerhard Schwarz
- 1935–1955 Gottfried Grote
- 1955–1963 Hanns-Martin Schneidt
- 1963–1976 Heinz Werner Zimmermann
- 1976–1998 Martin Behrmann
