= Gottfried Grote =

German musician

Gottfried Grote (15 May 1903 – July 1976) was a German church musician.

Born in Oberfrohna, Grote was from 1926 to 1935 organist and choir director of the Bach-Verein (Bach association) in Wuppertal, which later was named Wupperfelder Kantorei (Wupperfeld chorale). From 1935 he was director of the Spandauer Kirchenmusikschule (Spandau school of church music. Grote also became a professor at the Berlin Conservatory. From 1955 he was the conductor of the Staats- und Domchor Berlin (State and cathedral choir Berlin). He is best known as editor of the collection of hymns Das Geistliche Chorlied (The sacred choral song), nicknamed after him "Der Grote".

Grote was a particular admirer of Heinrich Schütz. He arranged in Wupperfeld the third festival Heinrich-Schütz-Fest. He died in Berlin. Pupils of Gottfried Grote have included Ewald Dorfmüller and Erhard Egidi.
