= Ernst Pepping =

German composer

- Pepping, c. 1960
- Born: Ernst Heinrich Franz Pepping; 12 September 1901; Duisburg, German Empire
- Died: 1 February 1981 (aged 79); Spandau, West Berlin, West Germany
- Occupations: Composer; Academic teacher
- Organizations: Spandauer Kirchenmusikschule; Berliner Hochschule für Musik

Ernst Pepping (12 September 1901 – 1 February 1981) was a German composer of classical music and academic teacher. He is regarded as an important composer of Protestant sacred music in the 20th century.

Pepping taught at the Spandauer Kirchenmusikschule and the Berliner Hochschule für Musik. His music includes works for instruments (three symphonies), the church (the motet Jesus und Nikodemus, the Missa Dona nobis pacem), and collections including the Spandauer Chorbuch (Spandau choir book) and the three volume Großes Orgelbuch (Great Organ Book), which provides pieces for the entire liturgical year.

== Career ==
Born Ernst Heinrich Franz Pepping in Duisburg, Pepping first studied to be a teacher. From 1922 to 1926 he studied composition at the Berliner Hochschule für Musik with Walter Gmeindl, a pupil of Franz Schreker. Pepping composed mostly instrumental music until 1928. In 1926 his works Kleine Serenade für Militärorchester (Little serenade for military band) and Suite für Trompete, Saxophon und Posaune (Suite for trumpet, saxophone and trombone) were premiered at the Donaueschinger Musiktage. He received the composition award of the Mendelssohn Foundation. In 1929 his Choralsuite (Chorale suite) was first performed in Duisburg and well received.

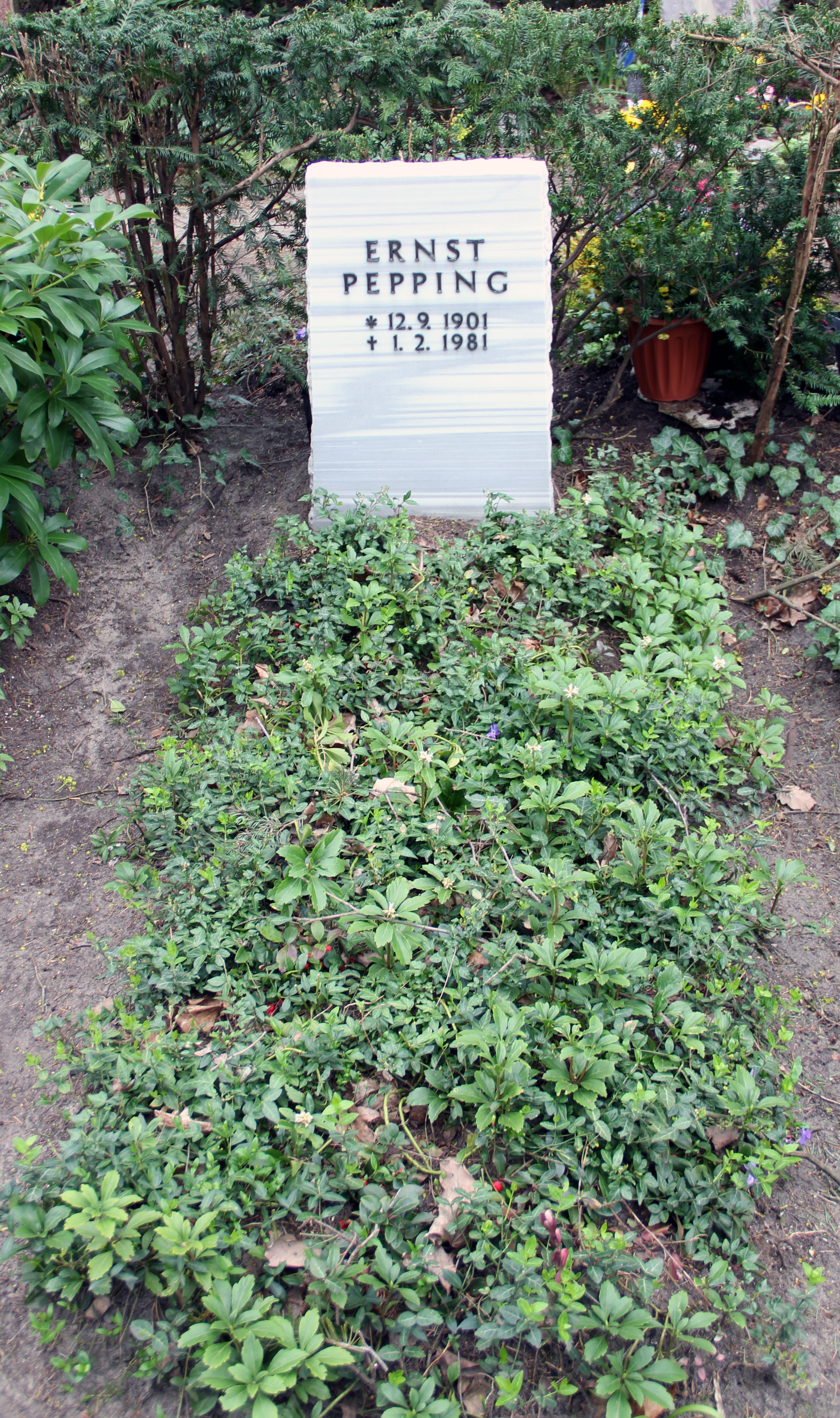
Tomb in Berlin

In 1934, Pepping accepted a position as teacher of harmony, sight-reading and counterpoint at the Spandauer Kirchenmusikschule of the Protestant Johannesstift Berlin in Spandau, where he lived until his death. Among his many students were Helmut Barbe and Erhard Egidi. Pepping also taught at the Berliner Hochschule from 1935 to 1938 as a professor of church music and composition. He had ties to the Confessing Church and wrote a great deal of music on German texts. In 1938, after a 1937 Church Music Festival in which he participated, he composed a German mass, Deutsche Messe: Kyrie Gott Vater in Ewigkeit (German Mass: Kyrie God Father in Eternity), which stressed the German nation, and which also followed the Party line. During World War II, even during its final phase, Pepping was included in the Gottbegnadeten list of artists deemed crucial to the art of the Third Reich, and was therefore exempted from military service.

Pepping taught again at the Berliner Hochschule from 1947 to 1968. He retired in 1968 and also stopped composing. He died in Spandau and is buried in Berlin's Friedhof Heerstraße Cemetery.

== Composition ==
Pepping is regarded as one of the most important composers of Protestant church music in the 20th century. His sacred works for choir a cappella included masses such as the Missa Dona nobis pacem, motets and chorales, for example the collection Spandauer Chorbuch (Spandau choir book). He also composed secular vocal music, organ music, orchestral works including three symphonies, and chamber music. Pepping based his church music on Protestant hymns, the vocal polyphony of the 16th and 17th century and modal keys.

Pepping first wrote severe works with "uncompromising dissonance". In the 1930s he wrote more compromising music, including a Deutsche Choralmesse in 1931, a setting not of the Order of Mass, but a series of chorales related to the functions in the liturgy of the service, comparable to Schubert's Deutsche Messe and in 1938 a German mass, Deutsche Messe: Kyrie Gott Vater in Ewigkeit (German Mass: Kyrie God Father in Eternity) for a six-part mixed choir. On 30 October 1943 his Symphony No. 2 in F minor was performed to great acclaim by the Berlin Philharmonic, conducted by Wilhelm Furtwängler.

Pepping composed no more church music until 1948, when he wrote the Missa Dona nobis pacem, possibly as a "personal plea". The musicologist Sven Hiemke who analyzed the work in a book on Pepping's mass compositions notes that the work can be understood as Bekenntnismusik (confessional music) even if the composer would disagree.

Pepping's works were published by Schott Music. They are kept in the archive of the Academy of Arts, Berlin. His Nachlass is held by the Berlin State Library.

== Awards ==
Pepping received honorary doctorates from the Free University of Berlin (1961) and the Kirchliche Hochschule Berlin (1971). He was a member of the Academy of Arts, Berlin, and the Bavarian Academy of Fine Arts, Munich.

The minor planet 11043 Pepping is named after him.

== Selected works ==
- Three symphonies (recorded on cpo) 1932, 1942 (F minor), 1944 (E-flat) (Die Tageszeiten)
- A piano concerto (1950)
- Variations for orchestra (pub. 1949)
- Zwei Orchesterstücke über ein Chanson des Binchois (1958)
- Masses, motets and other works for liturgical use including
  - Deutsche Choralmesse (1931)
  - Und ist ein Kind geboren, motet (1936)
  - Ein jegliches hat seine Zeit, three motets from Leviticus (1937)
  - Jesus und Nikodemus, motet on gospel text (1938)
  - Deutsche Messe (1938)
  - Missa Dona nobis pacem (1948)
  - Heut und ewig Liederkreis nach Gedichten von Goethe for a cappella choir
  - A setting of the Te Deum (1956)
  - Die Weihnachtsgeschichte des Lukas, a cappella choir (1959)
  - Passionsbericht des Matthäus, a cappella choir (1960)
  - A setting of the Psalm 23 (published 1962)
- Organ works (a CD of which was released by cpo in 1992, including his second concerto for organ, the Chorale Partita, Wie schön leuchtet der Morgenstern on "Wie schön leuchtet der Morgenstern", four fugues, and the partita Ach wie flüchtig, ach wie nichtig on "Ach wie flüchtig, ach wie nichtig")
  - Organ Sonata (pub. 1958), other works
  - Three Fugues on BACH (pub. 1949)
  - Großes Orgelbuch I: Advent & Christmas (pub. 1941)
  - Großes Orgelbuch II: Passion (pub. 1941)
  - Großes Orgelbuch III: Easter, Ascension, Pentecost, Michaelmas (pub. 1941)
  - Kleines Orgelbuch (pub. 1941)
- Piano works
  - Sonatine (1931)
  - Sonata for piano (pub. 1937)
- Songs
  - Liederbuch nach Gedichten von Paul Gerhard for mezzo-soprano & piano (1946)
  - Haus- und Trostbuch für Singstimme und Klavier (settings by Brentano, Goethe etc.) (1949)

== Recordings ==
Pepping's Symphony No. 2 in F minor was recorded live in Berlin on 30 October 1943 by the Berlin Philharmonic conducted by Wilhelm Furtwängler, remastered and reissued in 2007 by the Russian label Melodiya-Edition, the Soviets having taken the original tapes to Moscow in 1945. In 1990, organist Wolfgang Stockmeier recorded some organ works. The Passionsbericht des Matthäus (Passion report of Matthew) was performed in 1992 by the Danish National Radio Choir, conducted by Stefan Parkman. In 2002 the Sächsisches Vocalensemble performed the song cycle after Goethe, Heut und Ewig. Liederkreis nach Goethe-Gedichten (Today and eternally). More organ works were recorded in 2005 by George Bozeman. The Berliner Vokalensemble, conducted by Bernd Stegmann, sang in 2005 the Missa Dona nobis pacem and motets. All three symphonies and the piano concerto were recorded by the Nordwestdeutsche Philharmonie, conducted by Werner Andreas Albert with the pianist Volker Banfield in 2006.
