= Catacombs of Rome =

Ancient burial places in Rome, Italy

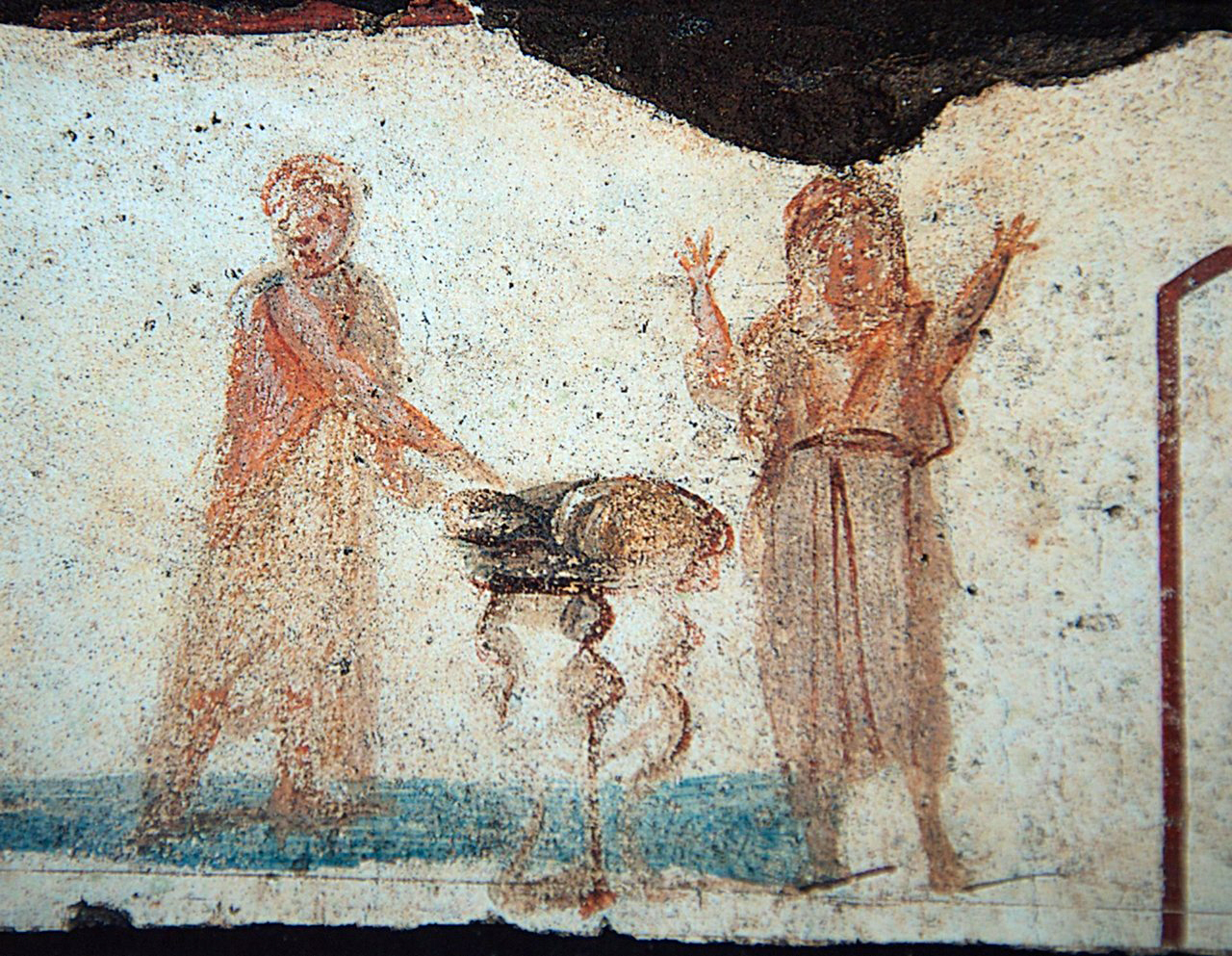
A Eucharistic fresco, Catacomb of Callixtus

The Catacombs of Rome (Italian: Catacombe di Roma) are ancient catacombs, underground burial places in and around Rome, some rediscovered since 1578, others even as late as the 1950s.

It is unknown exactly how many catacombs are in Rome. In 2012, it was noted that there were more than 40 Christian catacombs and 6 Jewish ones. However, in 2026, there are over 60 known catacombs in the city.

All of the Christian catacombs in the city are the property of the Catholic Church, and archaeologists must get permission to explore new ones.

== Background ==
Though most famous for Christian burials, either in separate catacombs or mixed together, Jews and also adherents of a variety of pagan Roman religions were buried in catacombs, beginning in the 2nd century AD, occasioned by the ancient Roman ban on burials within a city, and also as a response to overcrowding and shortage of land. The most extensive and perhaps the best known is the Christian Catacomb of Callixtus located near the Park of the Caffarella, but there are other sites, both Christian and not, scattered around the city, some of which are now engulfed by modern urban sprawl.

The Christian catacombs are extremely important for the history of Early Christian art, as they contain the great majority of examples from before about 400 AD, in fresco and sculpture, as well as gold glass medallions (these, like most bodies, have been removed). The Jewish catacombs are similarly important for the study of Jewish culture at this early period.

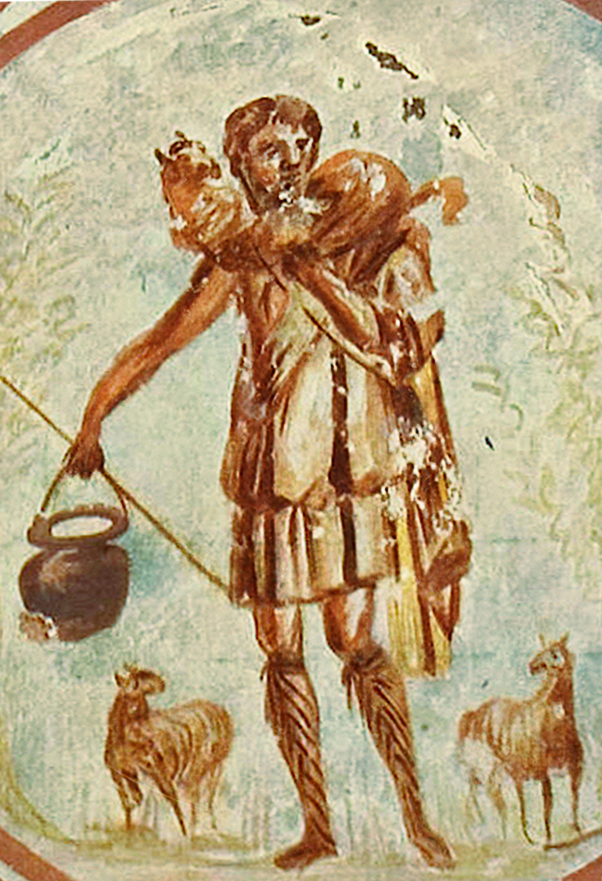
Good Shepherd fresco from the Catacombs of San Callisto

== Etymology ==
The word catacombs comes from the Latin root word catatumbas meaning either "among the tombs" or, according to other translations from the original Late Latin, "next to the quarry". The later translation stems from the first excavations done to create the catacombs system, which was conducted outside of Rome near the quarry.

== Precursors ==
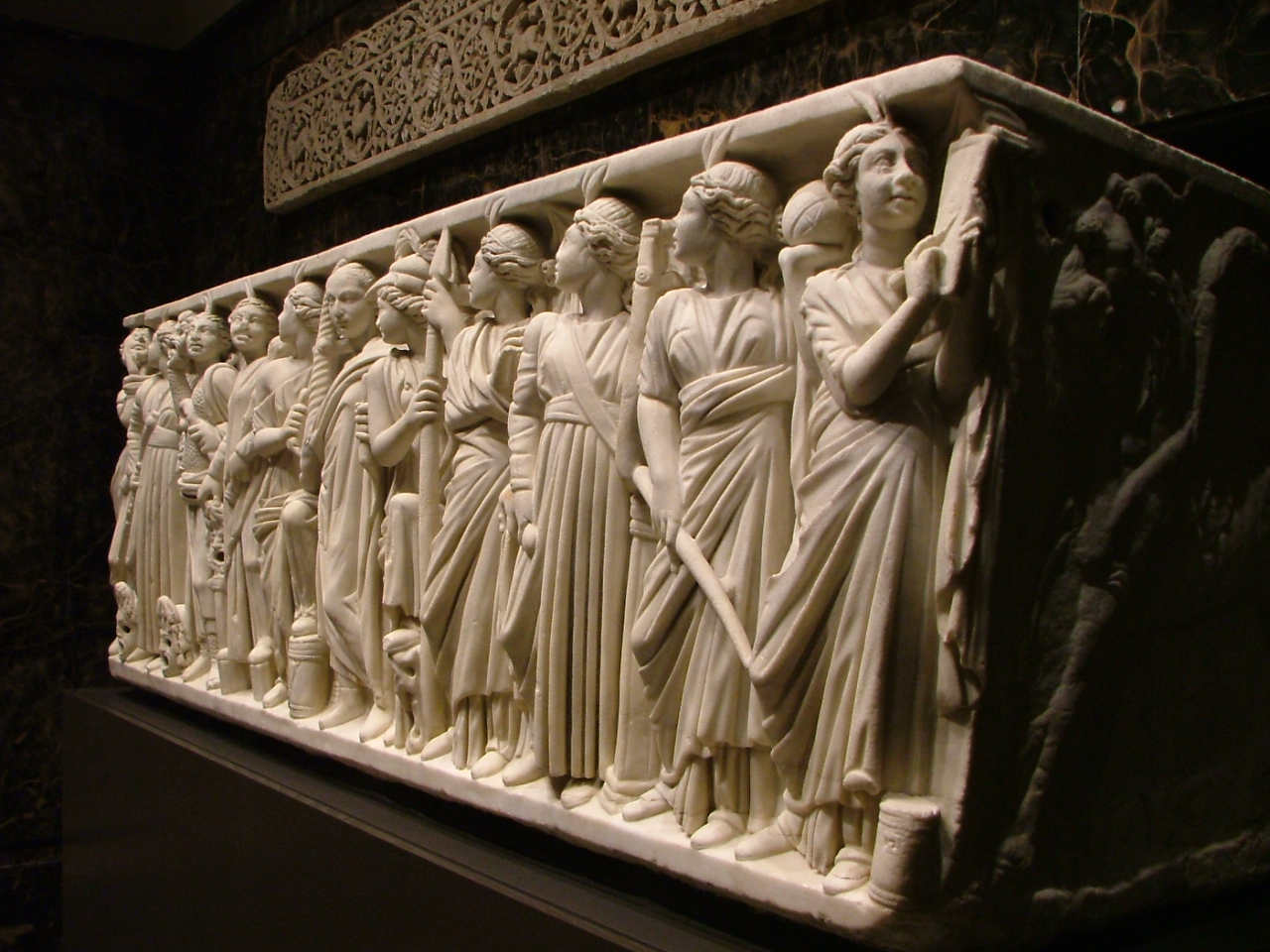
Carved Roman sarcophagus

The Etruscan civilization dominated a territory including the area which now includes Rome from perhaps 900 to 100 BC. Like many other European peoples, it had buried its dead in excavated underground chambers, such as the Tomb of the Capitals, and less complex tumuli. In contrast, the original Roman custom had been cremation of the human body, after which the burnt remains were kept in a pot, urn, or ash-chest, often deposited in a columbarium or dovecote. Rome faced two problems in the 2nd century CE: overpopulation and a lack of land. The city was growing, and many of the buildings were four or five stories tall. Since burials were not allowed inside the city walls, and early Christians did not agree with the pagan practice of cremating their dead, communal underground cemeteries provided a practical alternative. From about the 2nd century AD, inhumation (burial of unburnt human remains) became customary, either in graves or, for those who could afford them, in sarcophagi, often elaborately carved. By the 4th century, burial had overtaken cremation as the usual practice, and the construction of tombs had grown greater and spread throughout the empire. Jews and Christians preferred burial due to the idea of preserving the dead body for the resurrection. Considerable tracts of the ancient roads leading out of Rome and other Roman cities, like the Via Appia to this day, had monumental tombs running alongside them. These would inevitably cost a fortune to construct, whereas clearly in digging out of the catacombs would be less expensive.

Despite widespread popular modern ideas, these tunnels were probably not used for regular worship at first, but simply for burial. However, extending pre-existing Roman customs, memorial services, and celebrations of the anniversaries of Christian martyrs took place there. There are sixty known subterranean burial chambers in Rome. They were built outside the walls along main Roman roads, like the Via Appia, the Via Ostiense, the Via Labicana, the Via Tiburtina and the Via Nomentana. Names of the catacombs - such as St. Calixtus and St. Sebastian, which is alongside Via Appia - refer to martyrs that may have been buried there. However, about 80% of the excavations used for Christian burials date to after the time of the persecutions.

== Discoveries ==
Through research, it has been found that the population's diet consisted of freshwater fish. Sample D9-W-XVI-8, considered to be a two-year-old child, shows that children in Ancient Rome were breastfed and this child, in particular, had not yet been weaned off its mother. This results from the fact that the δ15N values had not begun to decline.

Fish had intertwined secular and religious aspects in Roman society. For one thing, it was a staple of the daily diet. It also had a variety of significance for Christians, for whom it was not only a common food, as for other Romans, but featured as a symbol in Christian iconography and was consumed at meals held to commemorate the dead.

== Christian catacombs ==
Roman law forbade burial places within city limits and so all burial places, including the catacombs, were located outside the walls of the city. The first large-scale catacombs in the vicinity of Rome were dug from the 2nd century onwards. They were carved in "tufa" (tuff), a type of volcanic rock which is relatively soft to dig into but subsequently hardens.

Christian catacombs existed as a burial ground for early Christians accompanied by inscriptions and early wall art. Although catacombs were of Jewish origin in the first century, by the end of the sixth century there were over sixty Christian catacombs. These catacombs served as a connector for various Christian communities through the underlying concepts of socio-economic status shown within the art. Additionally, the art showed a story of how Christians in the first couple of centuries viewed the world and their idealistic view of how it should be.

According to L. Michael White, the catacombs of Rome have a place in the romantic historiography of how early Christianity developed. This is because it has often been said those catacombs were good hiding places, and that when Christians were persecuted by the Roman Empire, they would go there to hold their worship.

However, White believes Christians did not use the catacombs of Rome to secretly hold their worship during times of persecutions. He says that they did not do so, in the first place because Christians were not persecuted on a regular basis by the Roman Empire, and in the second place because the larger rooms or chambers within the catacombs were not used for regular worship, the Eucharist or assembly by Christians. White says that those catacombs' larger rooms, which had some benches along their walls and were appropriate to hold eucharistic assemblies, were in fact used by Christians to "hol[d] meals for the dead". He states such "funerary meals" were practised among most families of the city of Rome. Therefore, he explains, Christians, in their everyday life, regularly went down into the catacombs of Rome, not to hold assemblies or the Eucharist, but "to hold memorial meals with dead members of their families, just like their pagan neighbors". V. Rutgers considers that "[r]esearchers have long debunked the myth that Christians used the catacombs as hiding places in times of persecution", because when those persecutions took place, the exact locations of the catacombs of Rome were widely known. Frank K. Flinn considers that during the period of Christian persecutions and shortly after it, Christians held "memorial rites and Eucharist" near the graves of the more famous Christian martyrs. He adds that "[c]ontrary to novel and movie lore," the catacombs of Rome "were not used as hiding places for Christians." Author J. Osbourne says that "nothing could be further from the truth" than the idea that Christians inhabited the Catacombs during the period of persecution.

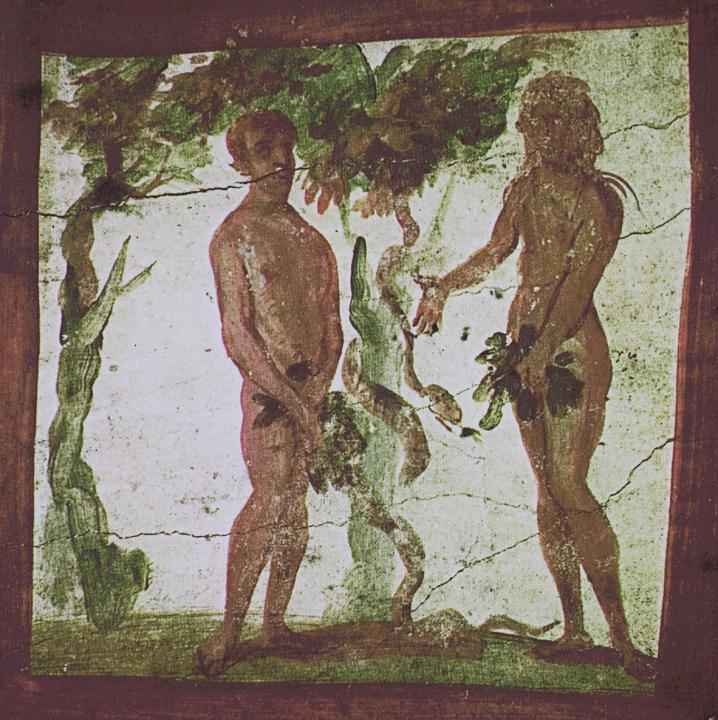
An earlier catacomb wall art, depicting Adam and Eve from the Old Testament.

Christian art in the catacombs is split into three categories: iconographic, stylistic and technical. From the first to the sixth century, the art in Roman Christian catacombs progressively went into phases as well: an early phase, an Old Testament phase and a New Testament phase.

Bodies were placed in chambers in stone sarcophagi in their clothes and bound in linen. Then the chamber was sealed with a slab bearing the name, age and the day of death. The fresco decorations provide the main surviving evidence for Early Christian art, and initially show typically Roman styles used for decorating homes - with secular iconography adapted to a religious function. The catacomb of Saint Agnes is a small church. Some families were able to construct cubicula which would house various loculi and the architectural elements of the space would offer support for decoration. Another excellent place for artistic programs were the arcosolia.

== History of original tunnelling ==
The complex system of tunnels that would later be known as the catacombs were first excavated by the Etruscan people that lived in the region predating the Romans. These tunnels were first excavated in the process of mining for various rock resources such as limestone and sandstone. These quarries became the basis for later excavation, first by the Romans for rock resources and then by the Christians and Jews for burial sites and mass graves.

== Decline and rediscovery ==
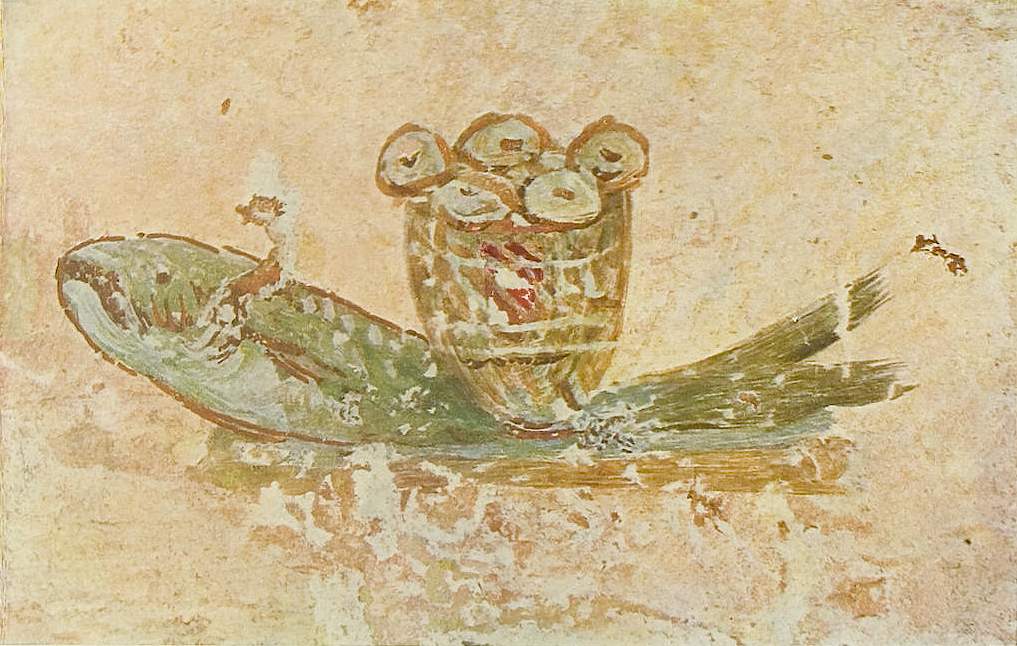
The fish and loaves fresco, Catacombs of San Callisto

After the Edict of Milan in 313, many Roman Christians flocked to the catacombs in order to find relics from the martyrs, and would pillage through the remains. Due to this, vandalism became rampant in the catacombs. In 380, Christianity became a state religion. At first, many still desired to be buried in chambers alongside the martyrs. However, the practice of catacomb burial declined slowly, and the dead were increasingly buried in church cemeteries. In the 6th century, catacombs were used only for martyrs' memorial services, though some paintings were added as late as the 7th century, for example, a Saint Stephen in the Catacomb of Commodilla. Apparently, Ostrogoths, Vandals and Lombards that sacked Rome also violated the catacombs, presumably looking for valuables. By the 10th century, catacombs were practically abandoned, and holy relics were transferred to above-ground basilicas. Osbourne disputes this characterization, suggesting that the catacombs fell into disrepair following the move out of Rome for the Avignon Papacy and it was only because of the lack of sufficient religious practice in Rome that led the catacombs to completely fall into disrepair.

In the intervening centuries they remained forgotten until they were accidentally rediscovered in 1578, after which Antonio Bosio spent decades exploring and researching them for his Roma Sotterranea (1632). Archeologist Giovanni Battista de Rossi (1822–1894) published the first extensive professional studies about catacombs. In 1956 and 1959 Italian authorities found more catacombs near Rome. The catacombs have become an important monument of the early Christian church.

== Today ==
Responsibility for the Christian catacombs lies with the Holy See, which has set up active official organizations for this purpose: the Pontifical Commission of Sacred Archaeology (Pontificia Commissione di Archeologia Sacra) directs excavations and restoration works, while the study of the catacombs is directed in particular by the Pontifical Academy of Archaeology. The administration of some sites is entrusted on a day-to-day basis to local clergy or religious orders who have an activity on or adjacent to the site. The supervision of the Catacombs of St. Callixtus by the Salesian Fathers is well known. In the last years, with the growth of the internet, updated information is often available online, with an indication of a current street address, opening hours, fees, availability of guides in the different languages, size of groups permitted, and public transport. Like other historical sites in Italy, the catacombs are often not accessible at certain times of the day or on certain days of the week and may require online pre-booking. There are currently only 5 Catacombs open to the public; San Sebastiano, San Callisto, Priscilla, Domitilla and Sant'Agnese.

== Typology ==
Roman catacombs are made up of underground passages (ambulacra), in the walls of which horizontal niches (loculi) were dug. These loculi, generally laid out in sequences (pilae) one above the other from floor or waist level, could each contain one or more bodies. When placed inside of loculi, bodies were usually covered in a shroud and often covered in lime, which helped to cover the smell of the decaying process. In order to make more money, fossors would often sell occupied loculi to other people. A loculus large enough to contain two bodies were referred to as a bisomus. Another type of burial, typical of Roman catacombs, was the arcosolium, consisting of a curved niche, enclosed under a carved horizontal marble slab. Cubicula (burial rooms containing loculi all for one family) and cryptae (chapels decorated with frescoes) are also commonly found in catacomb passages. When space began to run out, other graves were also dug in the floor of the corridors - these graves are called formae.

== List of catacombs in Rome ==
The Roman catacombs, of which there are forty in the suburbs or former suburbs, were built along the consular roads out of Rome, such as the Via Appia, the Via Ostiensis, the Via Labicana, the Via Tiburtina and the Via Nomentana. With the exception of the Via Ostiensis (Italian: Via Ostiense), these ancient Latin terms are also the current Italian names for these roads.

=== Catacombs of Marcellinus and Peter ===
These catacombs are situated on the ancient Via Labicana, today Via Casilina in Rome, Italy, near the church of Santi Marcellino e Pietro ad Duas Lauros. Their name refers to the Christian martyrs Marcellinus and Peter who, according to tradition, were buried here, near the body of St. Tiburtius.

=== Catacombs of Domitilla ===
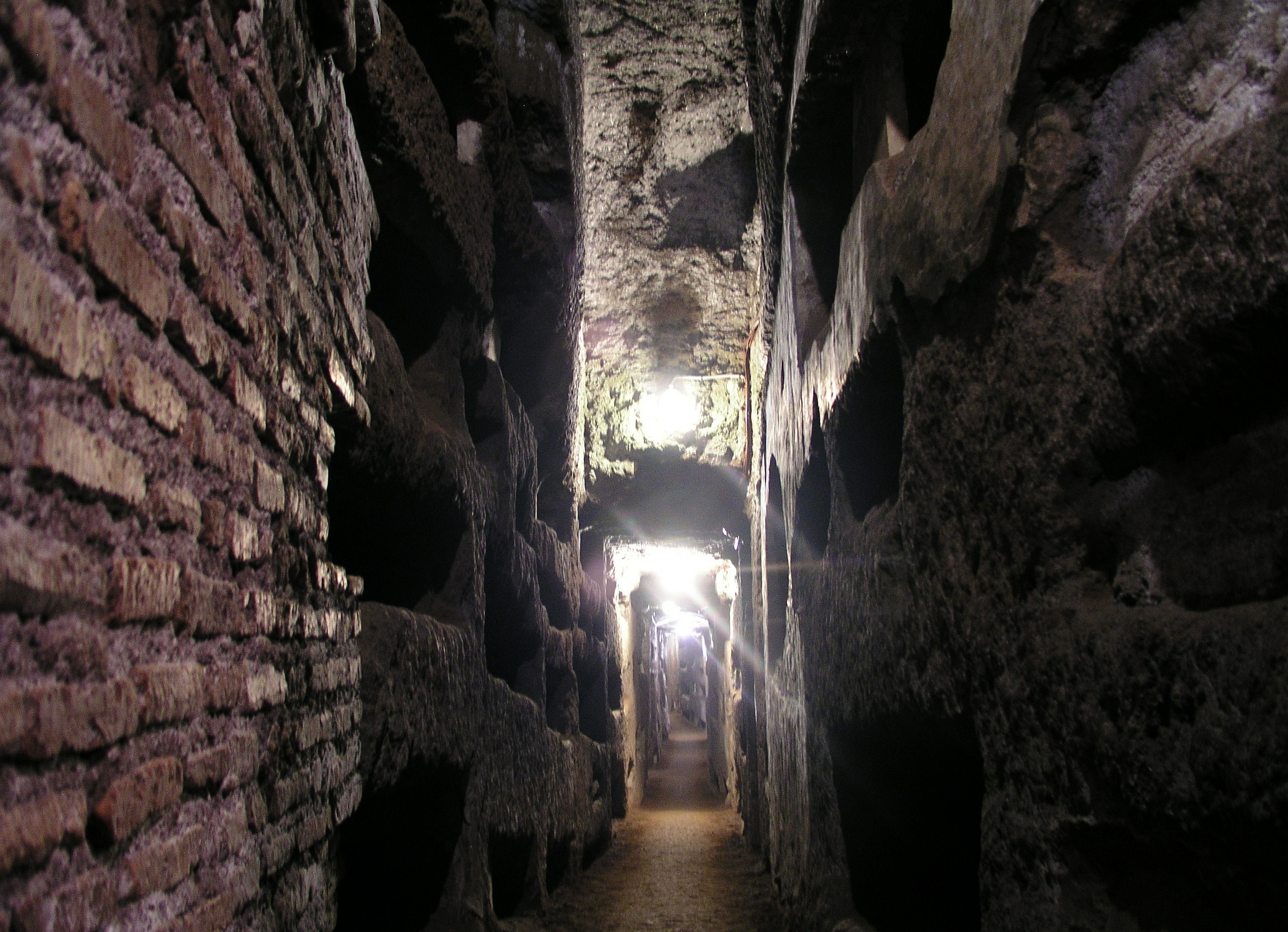
Catacombs of Domitilla

Close to the Catacombs of San Callisto are the large and impressive Catacombs of Domitilla (named after Saint Domitilla), spread over 17 kilometres (11 miles) of caves.

In the beginning of 2009, at the request of the Vatican, the Divine Word Missionaries, a Roman Catholic Society of priests and Brothers, assumed responsibility as an administrator of St. Domitilla Catacombs.

=== Catacombs of Commodilla ===
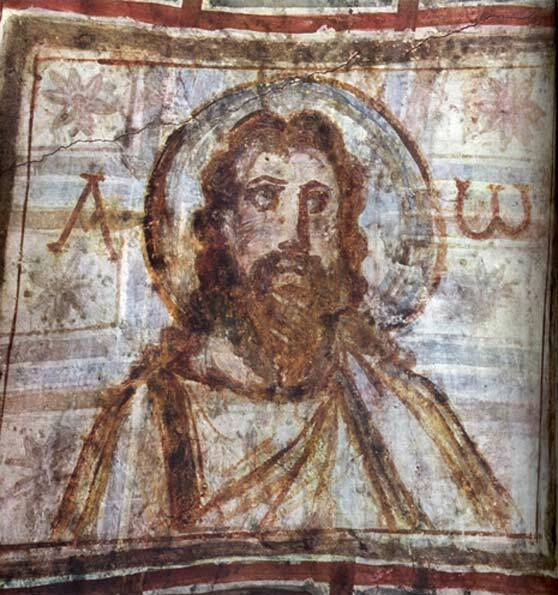
Bearded Christ, from catacombs of Commodilla

These catacombs, on the Via Ostiensis, contain one of the earliest images of a bearded Christ. They originally held the relics of Saints Felix and Adauctus. Excavations on the Commodilla were conducted by Franciscan archaeologist Bellarmino Bagatti (1933–34).

=== Catacombs of Generosa ===
Located on the Campana Road, these catacombs are said to have been the resting place, perhaps temporarily, of Simplicius, Faustinus and Beatrix, Christian Martyrs who died in Rome during the Diocletian persecution (302 or 303).

=== Catacombs of Praetextatus ===
These are found along the Via Appia and were built at the end of the 2nd century. They consist of a vast underground burial area, at first in pagan then in Christian use, housing various tombs of Christian martyrs. In the oldest parts of the complex may be found the "cubiculum of the coronation", with a rare depiction for that period of Christ being crowned with thorns, and a 4th-century painting of Susanna and the old men in the allegorical guise of a lamb and wolves.

=== Catacombs of Priscilla ===
The Catacomb of Priscilla, situated at the Via Salaria across from the Villa Ada, probably derives its name from the name of the landowner on whose land they were built. They are looked after by the Benedictine nuns of Priscilla.

=== Catacombs of San Callisto ===
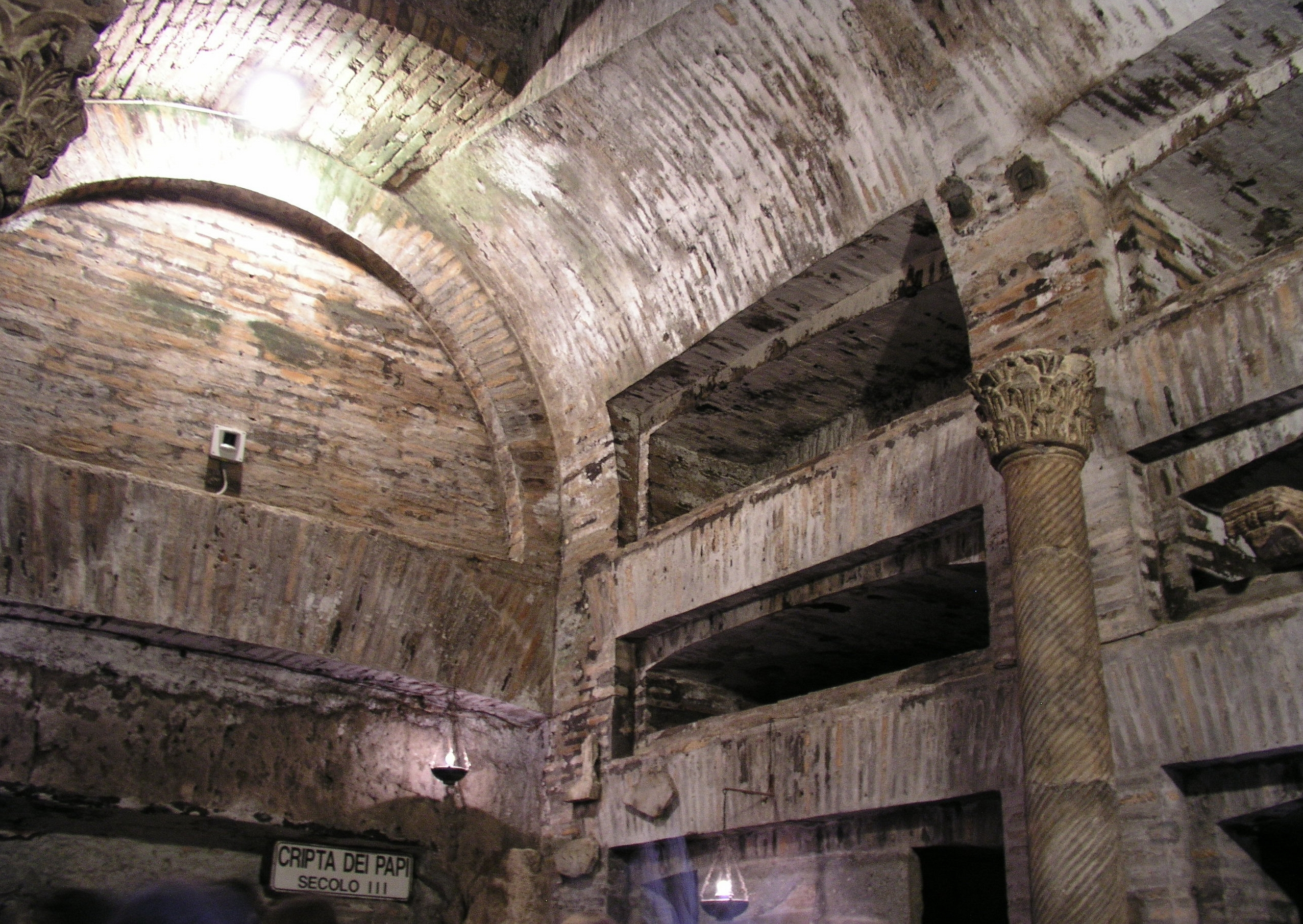
The Crypt of the Popes, Catacomb of Callixtus

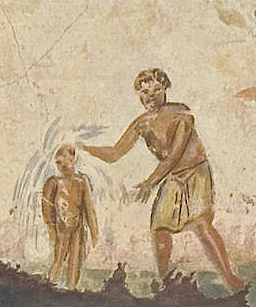
A fresco of a baptism from the Catacombs of San Callisto

Sited along the Appian way, these catacombs were built after 150 AD, with some private Christian hypogea and a funereal area directly dependent on the Catholic Church. It takes its name from the deacon Saint Callixtus, appointed by Pope Zephyrinus to administer this cemetery. On Callixtus' accession as pope, he enlarged the complex, that quite soon became the official one for the Roman Church. The arcades, where more than fifty martyrs and sixteen popes were buried, form part of a cemetery complex that occupies fifteen hectares. The Catacombs of San Callisto are around 90 acres large, 12 miles long and contain four levels, extending to a depth of more than 20 meters underground. Because of the large number of popes buried inside the catacombs, it has on occasion been called the "Little Vatican".

=== Catacombs of San Lorenzo ===
Built into the hill beside San Lorenzo fuori le Mura, these catacombs are said to have been the final resting place of St. Lawrence. The church was built by Pope Sixtus III and later remodeled into the present nave. Sixtus also redecorated the shrine in the catacomb and was buried there.

=== Catacombs of San Pancrazio ===
Established underneath the San Pacrazio basilica which was built by Pope Symmachus on the place where the body of the young martyr Saint Pancras, or Pancratius, had been buried. In the 17th century, it was given to the Discalced Carmelites, who completely remodeled it. The catacombs house fragments of sculpture and pagan and early Christian inscriptions.

=== Catacombs of San Sebastiano ===
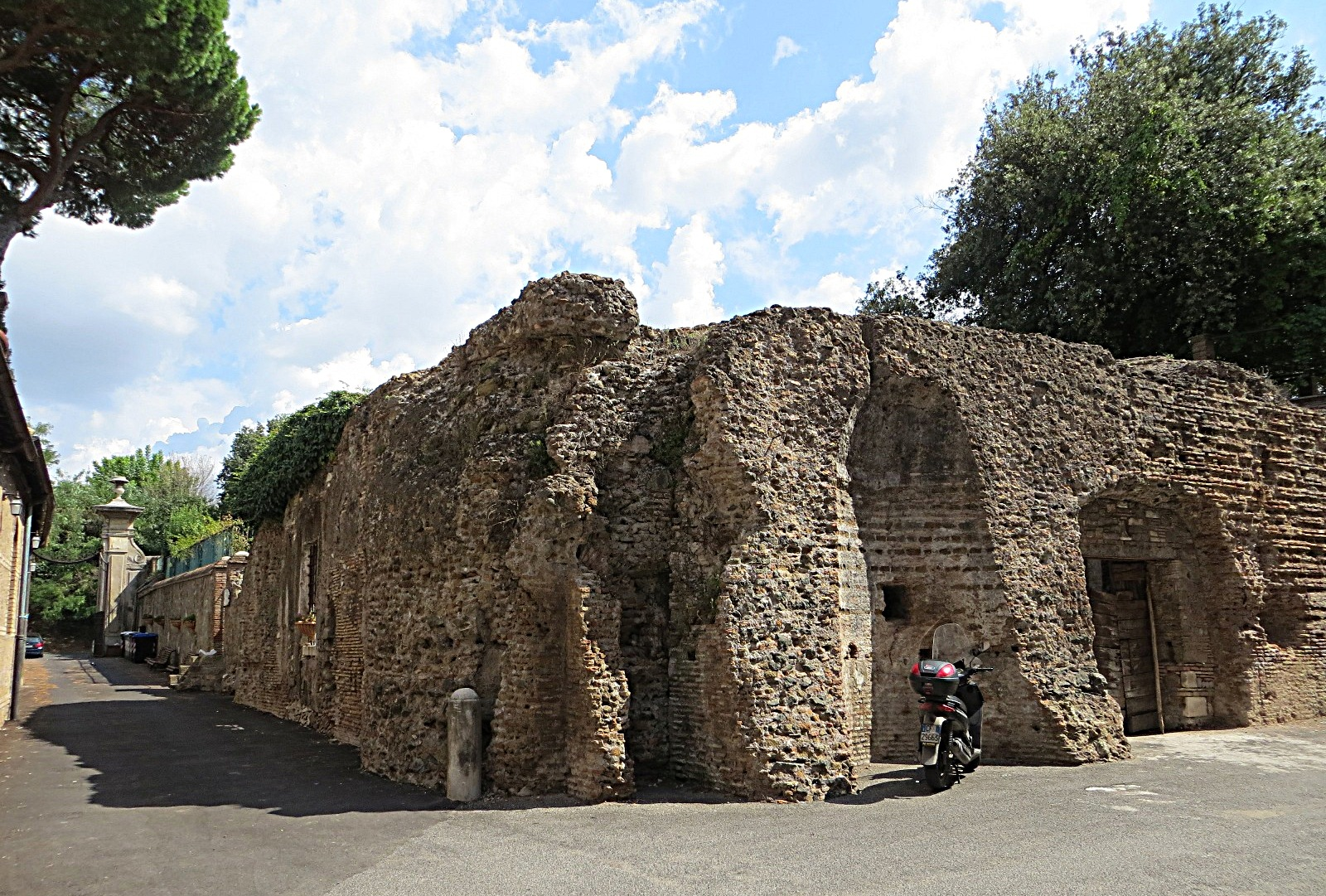
Catacombs of San Sebastiano

One of the smallest Christian cemeteries, this has always been one of the most accessible catacombs and is thus one of the least preserved (of the four original floors, the first is almost completely gone). On the left-hand end of the right-hand wall of the nave of the primitive basilica, rebuilt in 1933 on ancient remains, arches to end the middle of the nave of the actual church, built in the 13th century, are visible, along with the outside of the apse of the Chapel of the Relics; whole and fragmentary collected sarcophagi (mostly of 4th-century date) were found in excavations. This is where the martyrs Sebastian and Eutychius were buried.

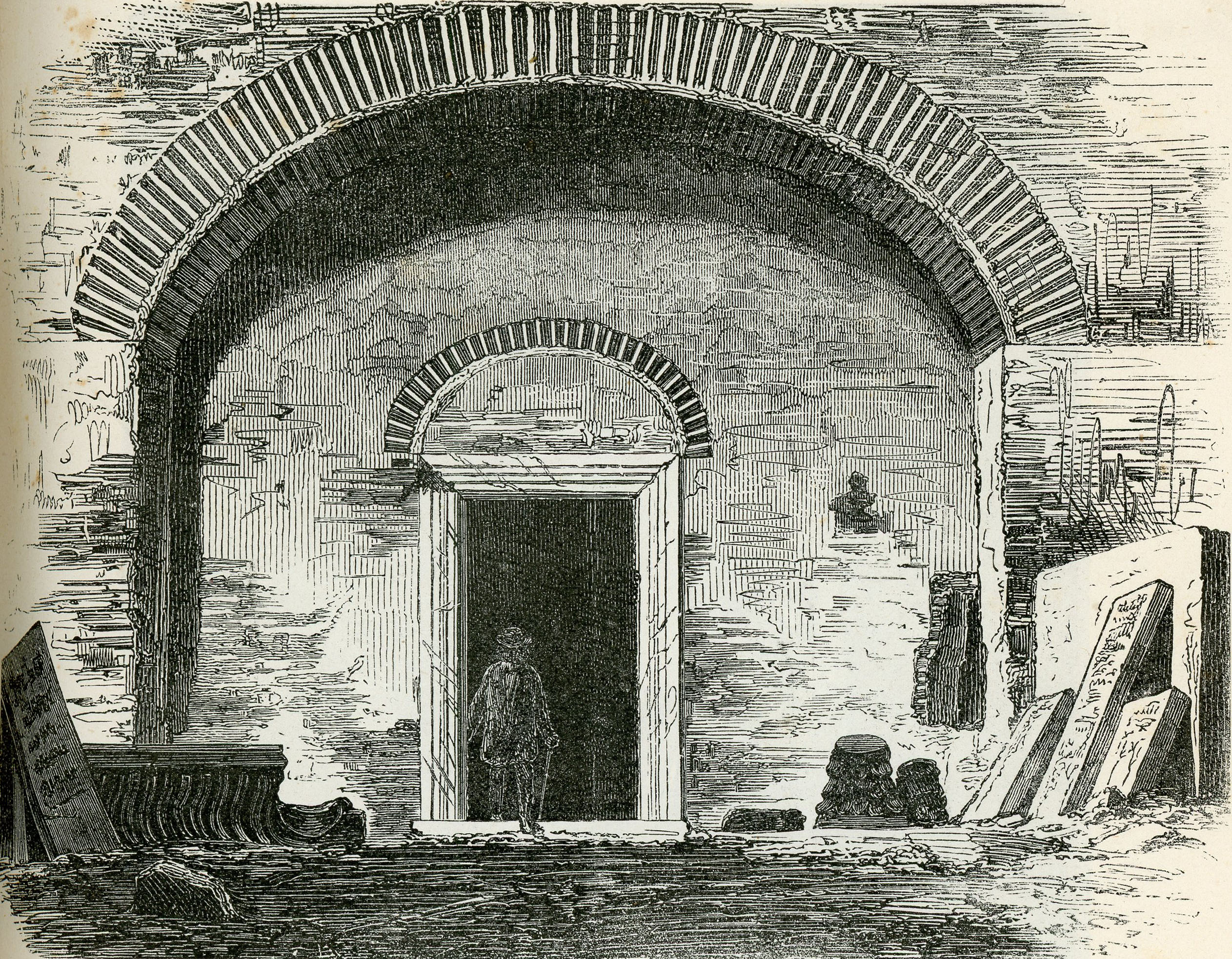
Interior picture of the catacomb of Saint Sebastian from 1894

Via a staircase down, one finds the arcades where varied cubicula (including the cubiculum of Giona's fine four stage cycle of paintings, dating to the end of the 4th century). One then arrives at the restored crypt of S. Sebastiano, with a table altar on the site of the ancient one (some remains of the original's base still survive) and a bust of Saint Sebastian attributed to Bernini. From here one reaches a platform, under which is a sandstone cavity ad catacumbas which once may have been named "ad catacumbas", thus giving this and all other tombs of this type their name. Three mausolea of the second half of the 2nd century (but also in later use) open off the platform. The first one on the right, decorated on the outside with paintings of funereal banquets and the miracle of the calling out of Cerasa's demons, on the inside contains paintings (including a ceiling painting of a Gorgon's head) and inhumation burials and has a surviving inscription reading "Marcus Clodius Hermes", the name of its owner. The second, called by some "tomb of the Innocentiores" (a burial club which owned it), has a refined stucco ceiling, Latin inscriptions in Greek characters, and a graffito with the initials of the Greek words for "Jesus Christ, Son of God, Saviour". On the left is the mausoleum of Ascia, with an exterior wall painting of vine shoots rising from kantharoi up trompe-l'œil pillars.

A room called the "Triglia" rises from the platform, roughly in the middle of the basilica and cut into from above by the present basilica. This covered room was used for funereal banquets; the plastered walls have hundreds of graffiti by the devotees at these banquets, carved in the second half of the 3rd to the beginnings of the 4th century, with appeals to the apostle's Peter and Paul. From the "Trigilia" one passed into an ancient ambulatory, which turns around into an apse: here is a collection of epitaphs and a model of all the mausolei, of the "Triglia" and of the Constantinian basilica. From here one descends into the "Platonica", construction at the rear of the basilica that was long believed to have been the temporary resting place for Peter and Paul, but was in fact (as proved by excavation) a tomb for the martyr Quirinus, bishop of Sescia in Pannonia, whose remains were brought here in the 5th century. To the right of the "Platonica" is the chapel of Honorius III, adapted as the vestibule of the mausoleum, with interesting 13th-century paintings of Peter and Paul, the Crucifixion, saints, the Massacre of the Innocents, Madonna and Child, and other subjects. On the left is an apsidal mausoleum with an altar built against the apse: on the left wall, a surviving graffito reading "domus Petri" either hints at Peter having been buried here or testifies to the belief at the time the graffito was written that Peter was buried here.

=== Catacombs of San Valentino ===
The catacombs of San Valentino were dedicated to Saint Valentine. In the 13th century, the martyr's relics were transferred to Basilica of Saint Praxedes.

=== Catacombs of Sant'Agnese ===
Built for the conservation and veneration of the remains of Saint Agnes of Rome. Agnes' bones are now conserved in the church of Sant'Agnese fuori le mura in Rome, built over the catacomb. Her skull is preserved in a side chapel in the church of Sant'Agnese in Agone in Rome's Piazza Navona.

=== Catacombs of via Anapo ===
On the via Salaria, the Catacombs of via Anapo are datable to the end of the 3rd or the beginning of the 4th century and contain diverse frescoes of biblical subjects.

=== Jewish catacombs ===
There are six known Jewish catacombs in Rome, two of which are open to the public: Vigna Randanini and Villa Torlonia.

The Jewish catacombs were discovered in 1918, and archaeological excavations continued for twelve years. The structure has two entrances, one on via Syracuse and the other inside Villa Torlonia. The catacombs extend for more than 13,000 square metres (140,000 sq ft), and date back to the period between the 2nd and 3rd centuries, and possibly remained in use until the 5th century. There are almost a century of epitaphs, but these do not show any examples of a particular belief, beyond some rare frescoes showing the classic Jewish religious symbols. The Jewish catacombs are distinguished from their Christian counterparts by various signs as well as the fact that Jews did not visit their dead in the catacombs. Parts of the Hebrew Bible - the Christian Old Testament - and the symbol of a Temple menorah have been spotted on the walls of the Jewish catacombs.

Due to high levels of humidity and temperature, bone preservation has been negatively affected in the catacombs. Scientists are unable to identify the sex of the dead due to the lack of preservation in the bones.

The other catacombs are not open to the public because of the instability of their structure and the presence of radon.

== Gallery of paintings from the catacombs of Rome ==
In the Catacombs of Rome, there are many different pieces of artwork. Most artworks are religious in nature, some depicting important Christian rites such as baptism, or scenes and stories such as the tale of "The Three Hebrews and the Fiery Furnace," or biblical figures such as Adam and Eve.

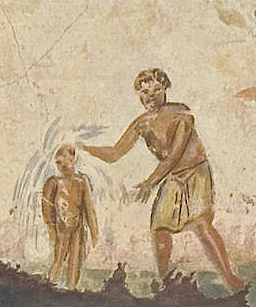

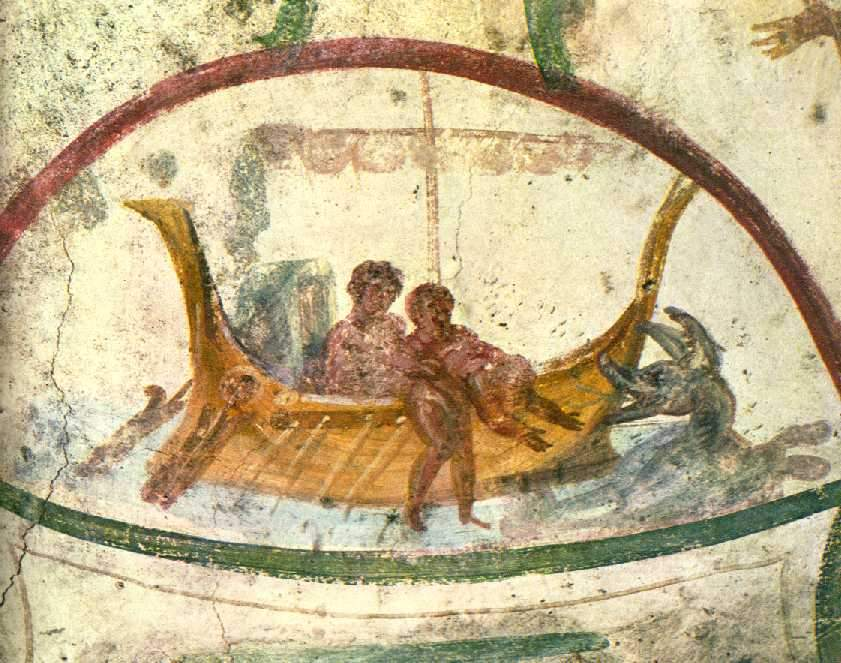

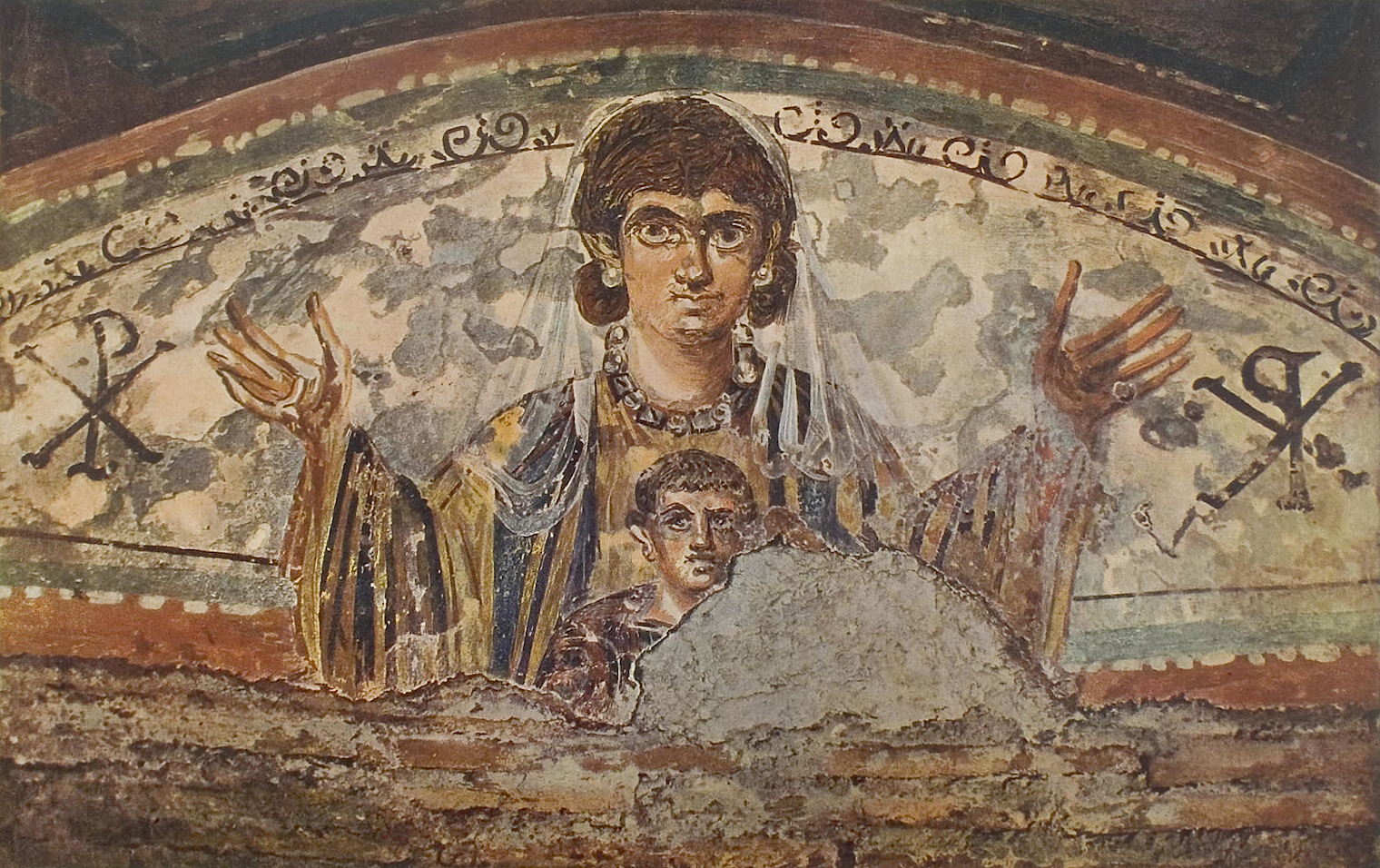

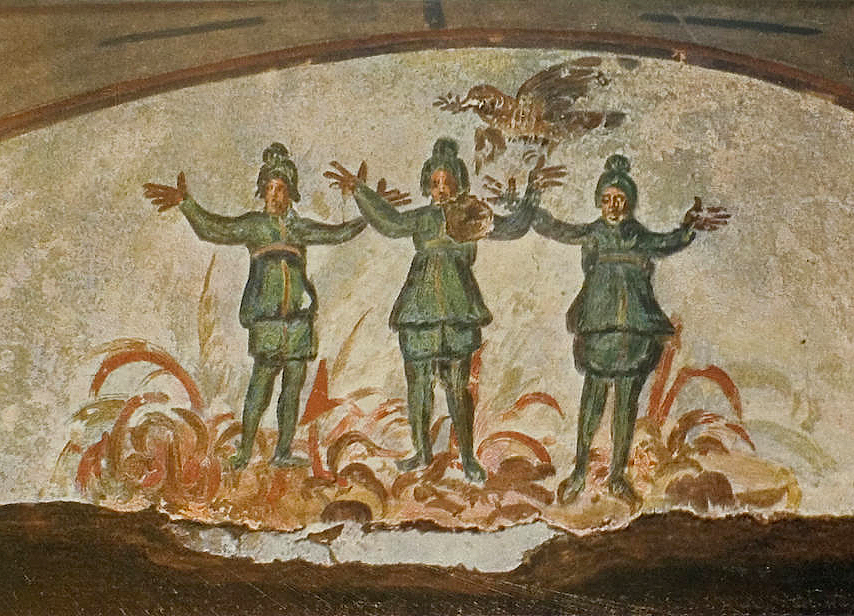

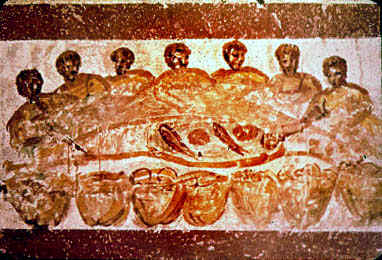

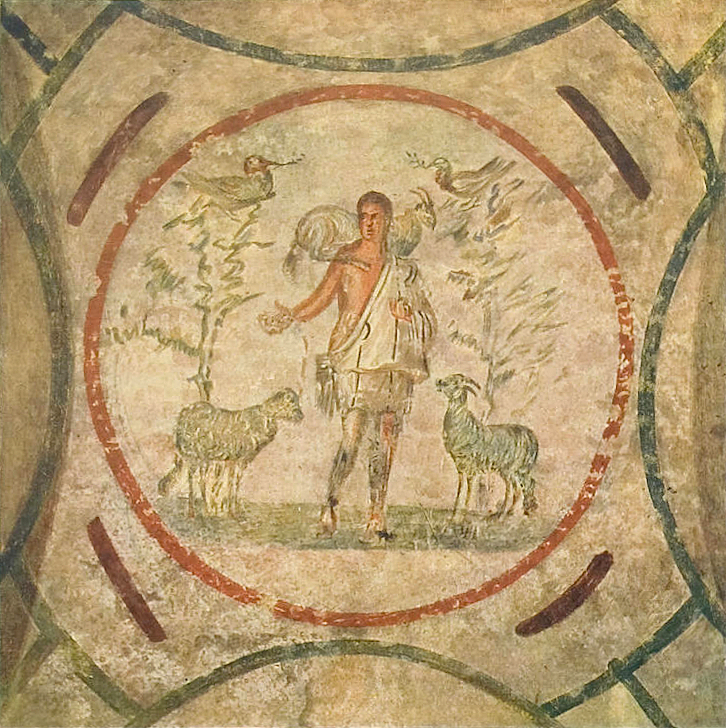

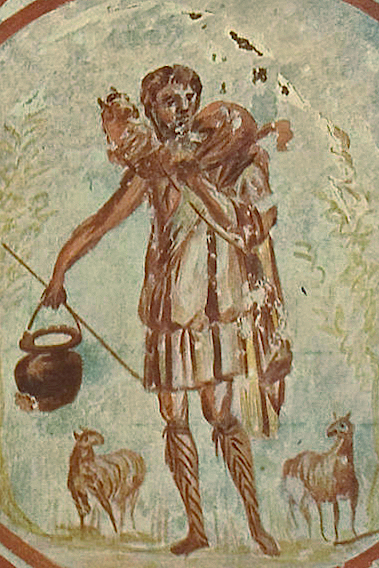

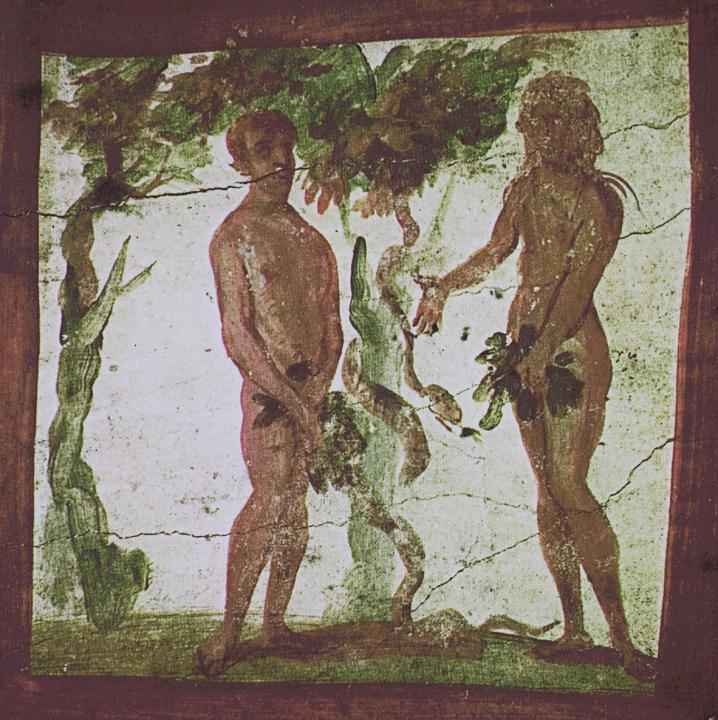

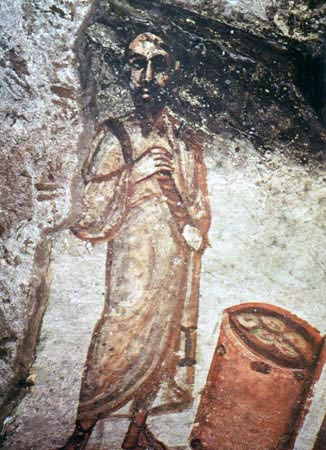

== See also ==
- Antonio Bosio, (c. 1575/1576 – 1629) – an Italian scholar, the first systematic explorer of subterranean Rome
- Catacomb saints – corpses from the Roman catacombs that were decorated and presented as relics of Christian saints
- Depiction of Jesus
- List of ancient monuments in Rome
- Ichthys

Preceded by Catacombs of Domitilla	Landmarks of Rome; Catacombs of Rome	Succeeded by Catacombs of San Sebastiano
