= Bisomus =

Type of burial tomb

A bisomus is a tomb large enough to contain two bodies.

== History ==
The ordinary tombs (loci) in the galleries of the Roman catacombs contained one body. It sometimes happened, however, that a space large enough to contain two bodies was excavated. Such a double grave is referred to in inscriptions as locus bisomus. An inscription from the catacomb of Callixtus I, for instance, mentions that a certain Boniface, who died at the age of twenty-three years and two months, was interred in a double grave which had been prepared for himself and for his father (Bonifacius, qui vixit annix XXII et II (mens) es, positus in bisomum in pace, sibi et patr. suo). A 4th century inscription tells of two women who had purchased, for their future interment, a bisomus in a "new crypt" which contained the body of a saint:

IN CRYPTA NOBA RETRO SAN
CTUS EMERVM VIVAS BALER
RA ET SABINA MERUM LOC
V BISOM AB APRONE ET A
BIATORE

"Balerra" and "Sabina" wished to be buried in the closest proximity to a martyr, retro sanctos, a privilege which, as another inscription says, "many desire but few receive" (quod multi cupiunt et rari accipiunt).
