= Columbarium of Pomponius Hylas =

Columbarium in Rome

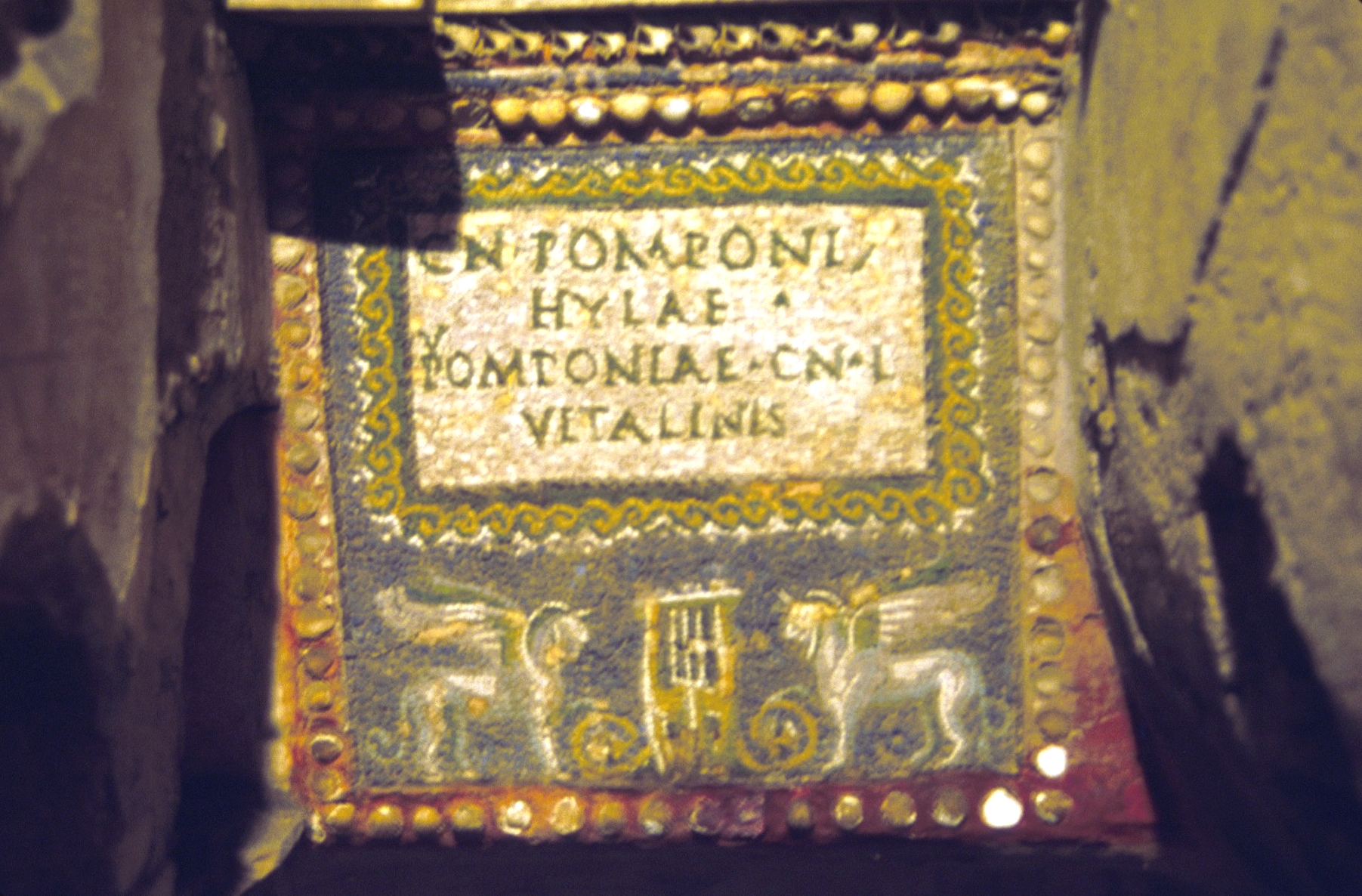
- Mosaic panel at entrance to columbarium of Pomponius Hylas on via di Porta Latina.

- Location within Rome
- Interactive map of Columbarium of Pomponius Hylas
- 41°53′N 12°30′E

The Columbarium of Pomponius Hylas is a 1st-century CE Roman columbarium, situated near the Porta Latina on the Via di Porta Latina, Rome, Italy. It was discovered and excavated in 1831 by Pietro Campana.

Though its name derives from Pomponius Hylas, who lived during the Flavian period (69–96 CE), the building itself has been dated to between 14 and 54 CE due to inscriptions on two of its niches (one dedicated to a freedman of Tiberius and the other to a freedman of Claudia Octavia, daughter of Claudius and Messalina). It was later bought by Pomponius Hylas for himself and his wife, and he added the mosaic panel over the entrance steps, which is decorated with griffins and reads:

CN(aei) POMPONI HYLAE E(t) POMPONIAE CN(aei) L(ibertae) VITALINIS
(Of Gnaeus Pomponius Hylas and Pomponia Vitalinis the freedwoman of Gnaeus)

The inscription also has a V (meaning vivit) over Pomponia's name, showing she was alive when the panel was added.

== Sources ==
- Nerone april 1996: The Columbarium of Hylas "
- JSTOR: Proposta per una Classificazione del Terzo Stile Pompeiano

Preceded by Catacombs of San Sebastiano	Landmarks of Rome; Columbarium of Pomponius Hylas	Succeeded by Mausoleum of Augustus
