= Catacombs of San Sebastiano =

Cemetery in Rome, Italy

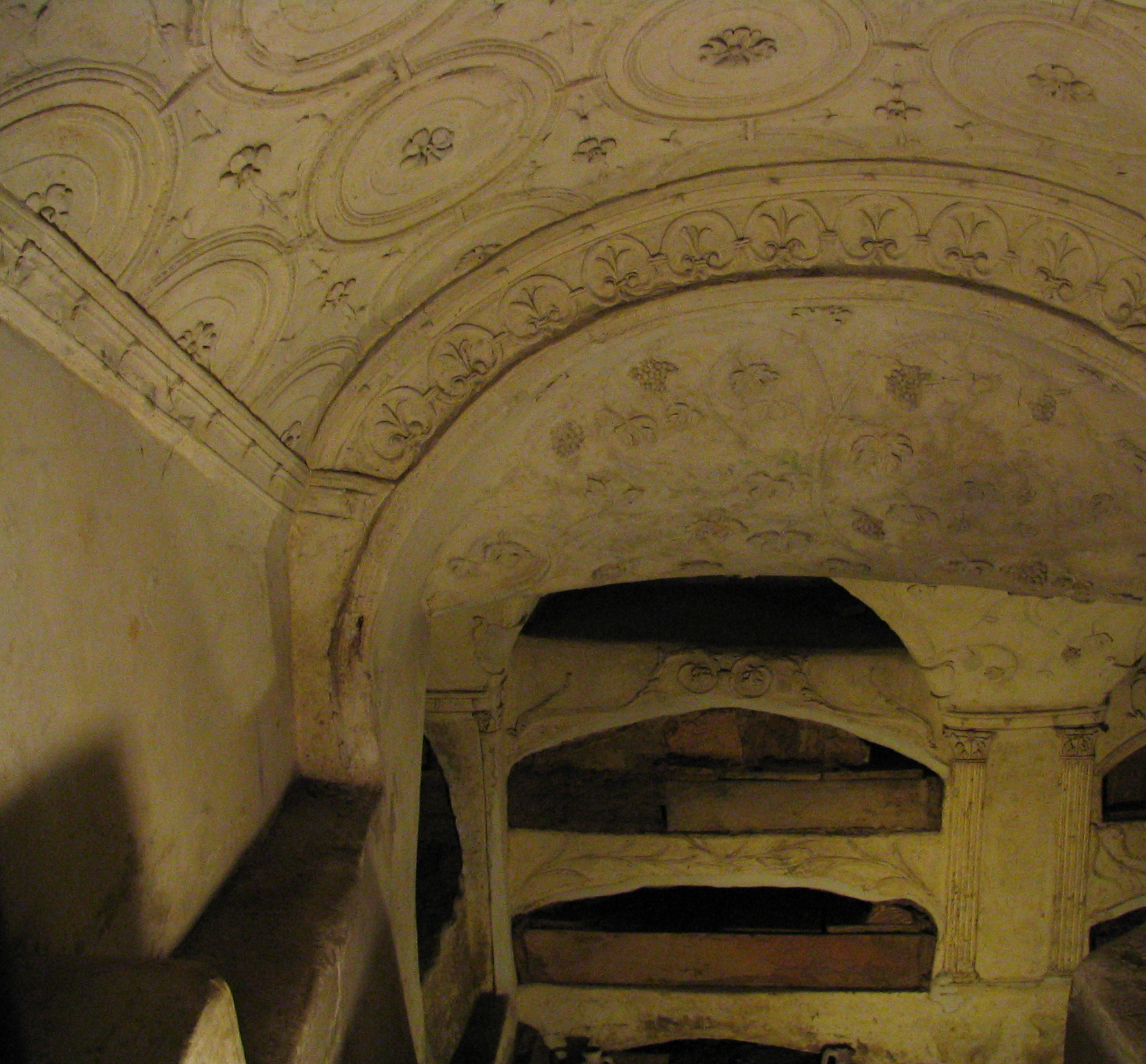
- The pagan mausoleum
- Interactive map of Catacombs of San Sebastiano
- 41°51′21″N 12°30′59″E
- Type: Catacombs
- Location: Rome, Via Appia Antica

History
- Built: Late antiquity

Site notes
- Management: Pontifical Commission of Sacred Archaeology

The Catacombs of San Sebastiano are a hypogeum cemetery in Rome, Italy, rising along Via Appia Antica, in the Ardeatino Quarter. It is one of the very few Christian burial places that has always been accessible. The first of the former four floors is now almost completely destroyed.

== The toponym ==
In ancient times the catacombs were simply known with the name in catacumbas, a Greek term composed by two words, katà and kymbe, literally meaning "close to the cavity". Actually, along the Appian Way, close to the cemetery, an evident dip in the ground is visible even now. Moreover, before its employment as a burial ground, the area was occupied by pozzolan mines, now placed about ten meters above the floor of the Basilica of San Sebastiano fuori le mura: these mines gave rise to a pagan cemetery, then used by Christians. The word catacumbas, through a process of extension and assimilation, was gradually used to identify all the hypogeum burial sites, thus simply called catacombs.

The underground graveyard, called di San Sebastiano since the Early Middle Ages, was known since the 3rd century as in memoria apostolorum, a toponym referred to the presence within the catacomb, for some time, of the relics of the Apostles Peter and Paul. In effect, the Depositio Martyrum (half of the 4th century), at the date of 29 June, talks about the recurrence of Peter in catacumbas and Paul on Via Ostiensis. The Martyrologium Hieronymianum (5th century), at the same date, cites the recurrence of Peter in the Vatican, Paul on Via Ostiensis and utrumque in catacumbas, Tusco et Basso consulibus (during the consulship of Tuscus and Bassus, that is in 258).

== The martyrs of the cemetery ==
Ancient sources attest the presence of three martyrs within the cemetery on the Appian Way: Sebastian, Quirinus and Eutychius. The names of the martyrs are mentioned in a 7th-century catalogue, called Notula oleorum, while the Early Middle Ages itineraries for pilgrims do not cite Eutychius, because its sepulchre was hard to reach.

As regards Sebastian, the Depositio Martyrum remembers his death and his entombment in catacumbas on 20 January. Little is known about him: Saint Ambrose (end of the 4th century) tells that he was born in Milan and that suffered martyrdom in Rome during the Diocletianic Persecution; the 5th-century Passio refers that he was a soldier from Narbonne, in Gaul, born of a family from Milan and died in Rome under Diocletian. His relics stood in the catacomb until the 9th century, then they were moved within the town walls and now are kept on the Appian Way again, in the Chapel of Saint Sebastian in the basilica above the cemetery.

Quirinus was a bishop of Sescia, in Pannonia, whose relics were moved to Rome by pilgrims from that region between the 4th and the 5th centuries.

Nothing is known about Eutychius but his grave, discovered during excavations carried out in the 20th century in a crumbly area of the catacombs; a poem dedicated to him, by Pope Damasus I, is now displayed at the entry of the basilica.

== History ==
Thanks to the excavations carried out at the end of 19th and during the 20th century, it was possible to recreate the topographic and architectural history of the area - consisting of three levels of galleries - in which the catacombs lie.

The area used to be a pozzolan mine; it was abandoned at the end of the 2nd century and then used by Romans as a place for pagan burial: simple graves for slaves and freedmen have been discovered, as well as monumental tombs, particularly in the so-called piazzola ("little square"), a circular compartment that had been an opencast mine, in which walls three mausoleums were dug. The presence, in these mausoleums and particularly in the so-called Mausoleum of Innocentiores, of typically Christian iconographies, such as the anchor and the fish, suggests that the mausoleums were used, at a later stage, also for the sepulture of Christians. Besides the piazzola, the dig of the cemetery galleries was started in this period.

Around the half of the 3rd century the whole piazzola was filled in, so as to create an embankment at an upper level. Three monuments have been brought to light on this shelf: the so-called triclia, a covered porticoed hall used for burial banquets, whose walls display more than 600 graffiti with invocations to the Apostles Peter and Paul; a marble-upholstered aedicule that, according to archaeologists, was the place where the relics of the two Apostles were kept during the period when they were moved in catacumbas; and a covered room with a well to draw water. The transfer of the relics of the Apostles to San Sebastiano in the mid-3rd century and their relocation in the former places at the beginning of the 4th century is still a debated issue among researchers and archaeologists.

Finally, in the first half of the 4th century also these spaces were buried, in order to build the embankment on which the Constantinian basilica was erected.

== Description ==
Within the right nave of the former basilica - rebuilt in 1933 above ancient remains - it is possible to see on the left the arches connecting with the middle nave of the present church, walled up in the 13th century, and the exterior of the apse of the Chapel of Relics. Here are gathered some sarcophagi, both entire and fragmentary (mostly dating from the 4th century), discovered during the excavations.

A ladder leads to the tunnels, with several cubicles; here, the paintings of Jonah's cubicle, dating back to the end of the 4th century and depicting four scenes of the life of the prophet, are quite outstanding. The restored Crypt of Saint Sebastian houses an altar shelf replacing the former one (of which some traces of the base still remain) and the bust of Saint Sebastian attributed to Bernini. Soon after there is the lay-by, under which lies a sandstone cavity that perhaps gave rise to the name "ad catacumbas", given to this cemetery and then extended to the other ones.

In the lay-by rise three mausolea dating back to the second half of the 2nd century, later re-used.

- The first one on the right is externally decorated with paintings (funeral banquets and the exorcism of the Gerasene demoniac) and still bears an inscription with the name of the owner, Marcus Clodius Hermes; the interior houses graves and pictures and shows a vault decorated with the head of a gorgon.
- The second one, called Mausoleum of Innocentiores referring to the funeral college to which it belonged, has a vault decorated with refined stuccoes; some recesses show inscriptions with Greek characters but written in Latin, as well as a graffito with the initials of the Greek words meaning "Jesus Christ Son of God Savior" (Ichtys).
- On the left there is the Mausoleum of the Adze, from the tool depicted on the exterior, whose decoration consists of shoots of vine sprouting from kantharoi placed on false pillars.

== Bibliography ==
- De Santis L. - Biamonte G., Le catacombe di Roma, Newton & Compton Editori, Rome 1997
- Ferrua A., La basilica e la catacomba di S. Sebastiano, Vatican City 1990
- Guarducci M., Pietro e Paolo sulla via Appia e la tomba di Pietro in Vaticano, Vatican City 1983
- Mancini G., Scavi sotto la basilica di S. Sebastiano sull'Appia, in Notizie degli Scavi di Antichità, Rome 1923, pp. 3–79

Preceded by Catacombs of Rome	Landmarks of Rome; Catacombs of San Sebastiano	Succeeded by Columbarium of Pomponius Hylas
