= Columbarium =

Place for the respectful and usually public storage of cinerary urns

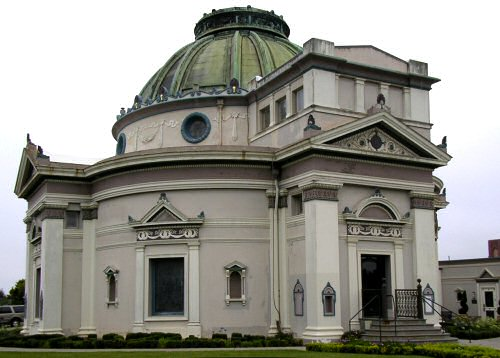
The San Francisco Columbarium

A columbarium (/ˌkɒləmˈbɛəri.əm/; pl. columbaria), also called a cinerarium, is a structure for the reverential and usually public storage of funerary urns holding cremated remains of the dead. The term comes from the Latin columba (dove) and originally solely referred to compartmentalized housing for doves and pigeons, also called dovecotes.

== Background ==
Roman columbaria were often built partly or completely underground. The Columbarium of Pomponius Hylas is an ancient Roman example, rich in frescoes, decorations, and precious mosaics.

Today's columbaria can be free-standing units or part of a mausoleum or another building. Some manufacturers produce columbaria built entirely offsite and brought to a cemetery by large truck. Many modern crematoria have columbaria. Examples of these are the columbaria in Père Lachaise Cemetery in Paris and Golders Green Crematorium in London.

In other cases, columbaria are built into church structures. One example is the Cathedral of Our Lady of the Angels (Los Angeles, California), which houses several columbarium niches in the mausoleum built into the lower levels of the Cathedral. The construction of columbaria within churches is ubiquitous in the Czechoslovak Hussite Church. An example can be seen at the Church of St Nicolas in Old Town Square, Prague. In the Catholic Church, although traditional burial is still preferred, cremation is permitted provided that the cremated remains are entombed and that the cremation is not done for reasons contrary to the Catholic faith. As a result, they are within some Catholic cemeteries.

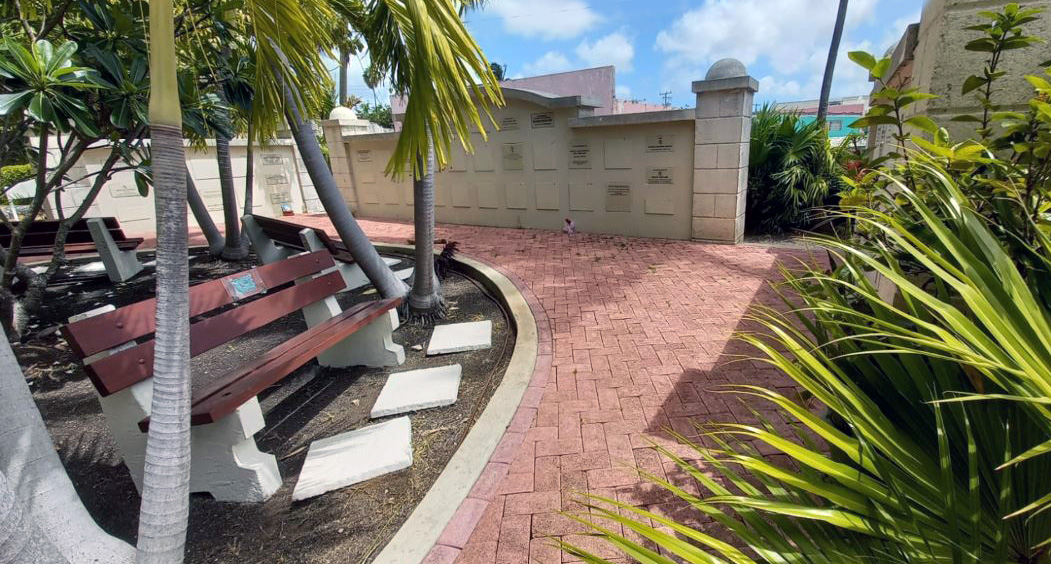
Columbarium in Hastings, Barbados.

Columbaria are often closely similar in form to pagodas, which function as in-situ columbaria pavilions at Buddhist temples, which from ancient times have housed cremated ashes. In Buddhism, ashes may be placed in a columbarium (Chinese: 納骨堂; pinyin: nágǔtáng; Japanese: のうこつどう; Korean: 납골당), which can be either attached to or a part of a Buddhist temple or cemetery. This practice allows survivors to visit the temple and carry out traditional memorials and ancestor rites.

== Gallery ==
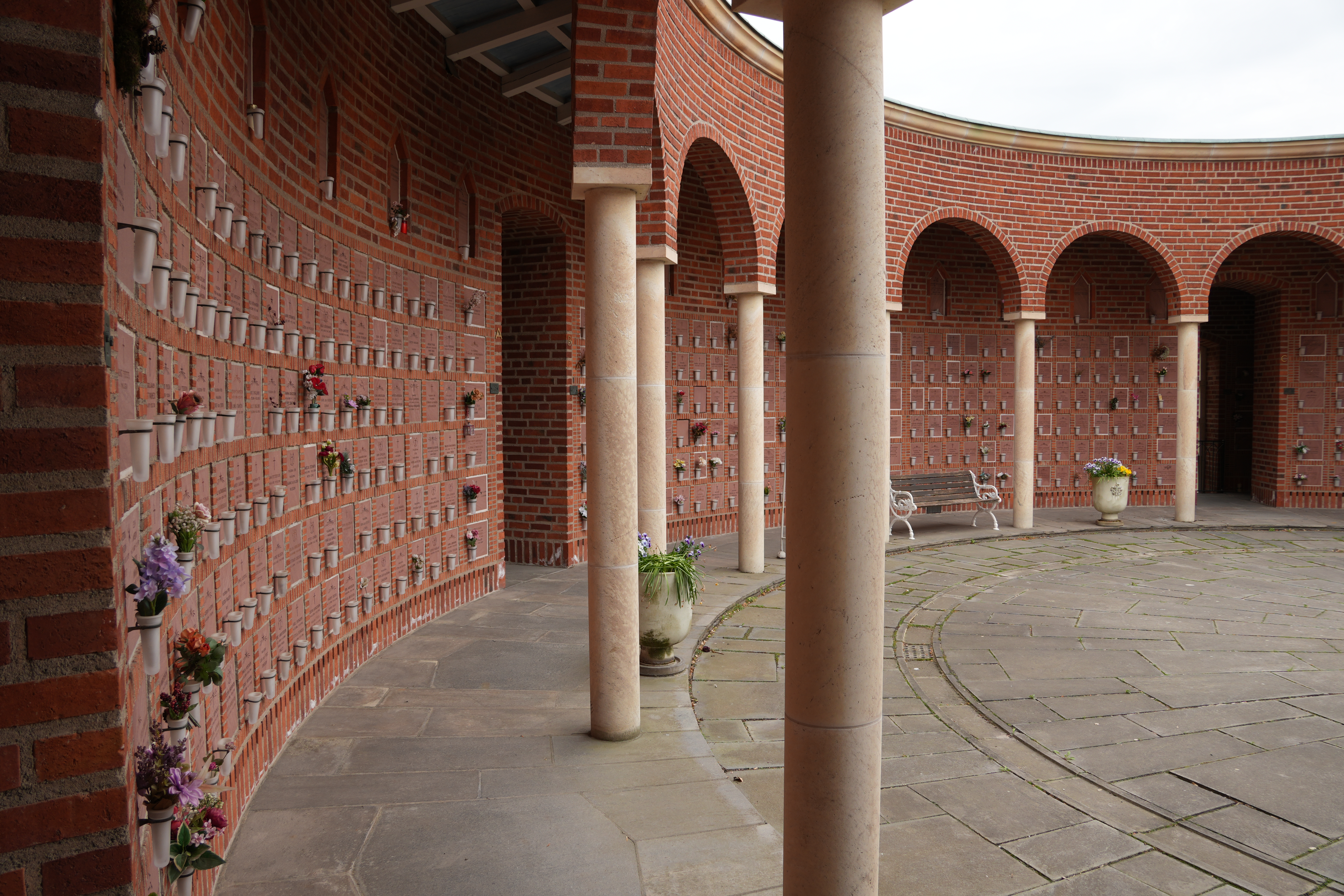
The columbarium of Högalid Evangelical-Lutheran Church in Stockholm

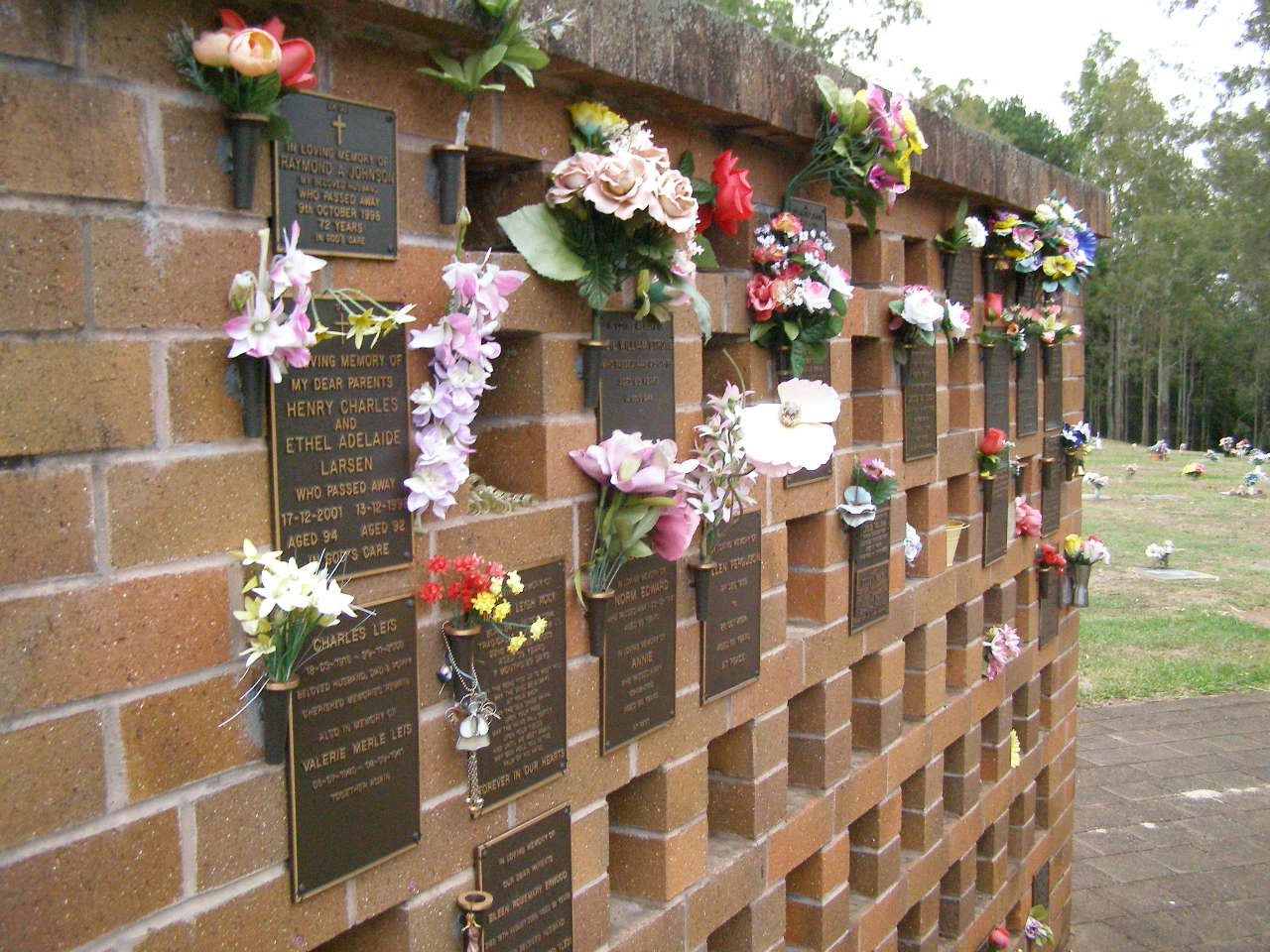
Columbarium wall, with flowers, plaques, and empty niches

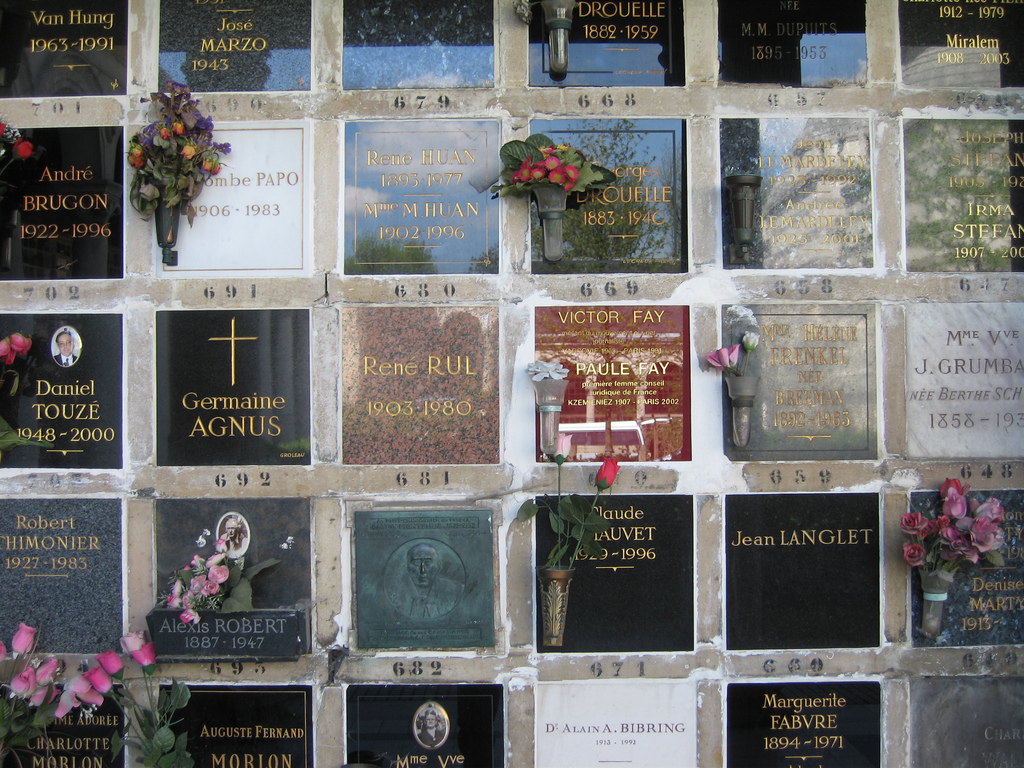
Detail of the columbarium at Père Lachaise Cemetery, Paris

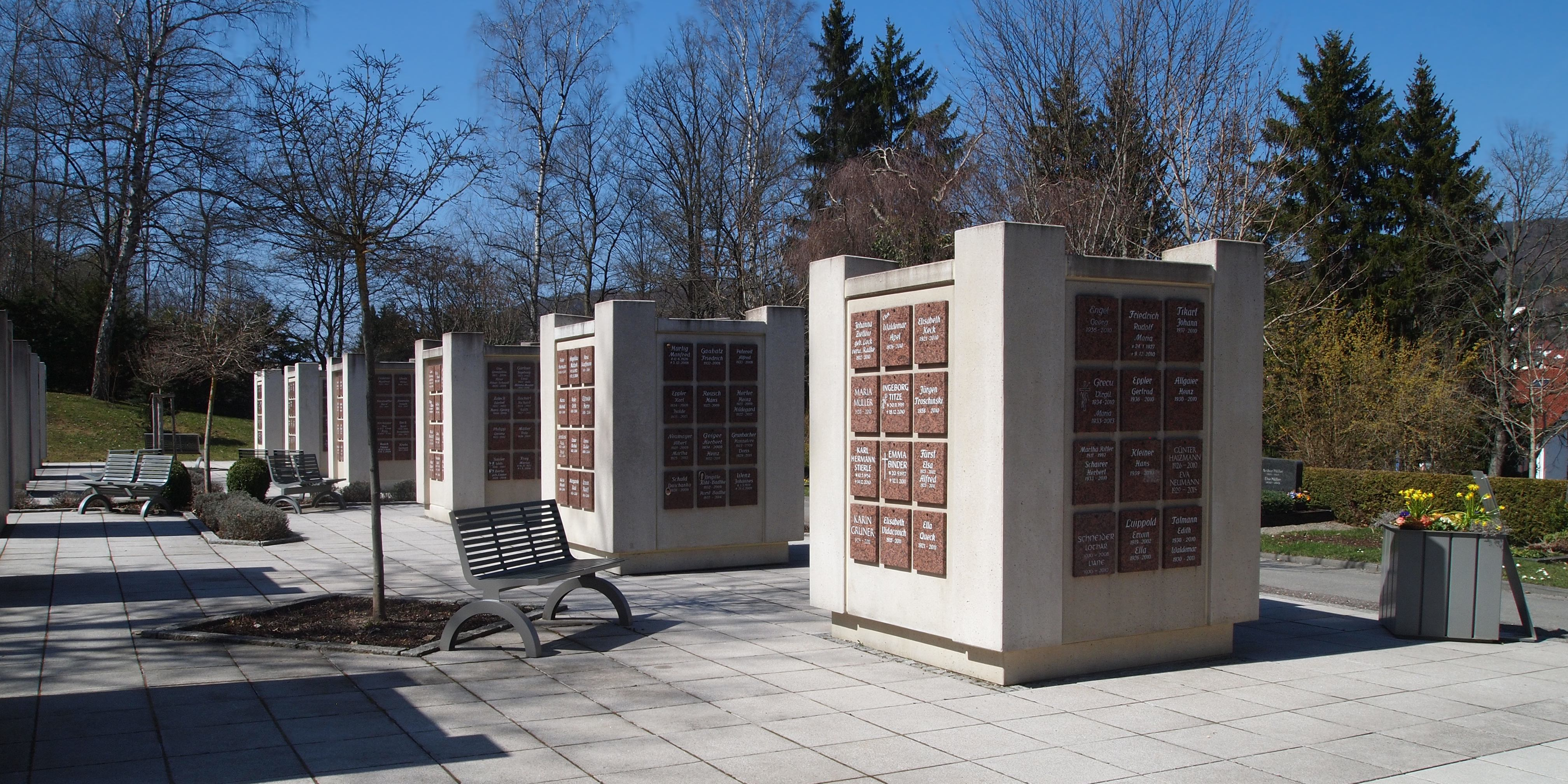
A modern columbarium in a small town (Ebingen, Germany)

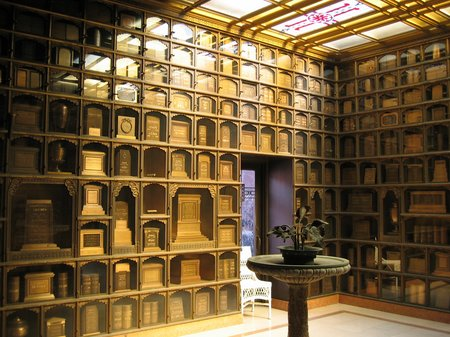
Interior of columbarium at Chapel of the Chimes in Oakland, California. Some of the cinerary urns are book-shaped.

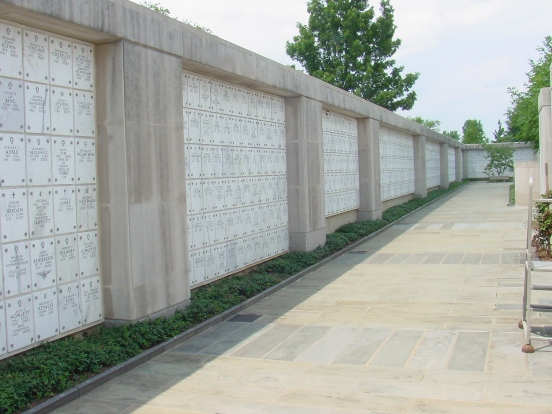
Columbarium at Arlington National Cemetery in Virginia. Each niche is covered with a marble plaque.

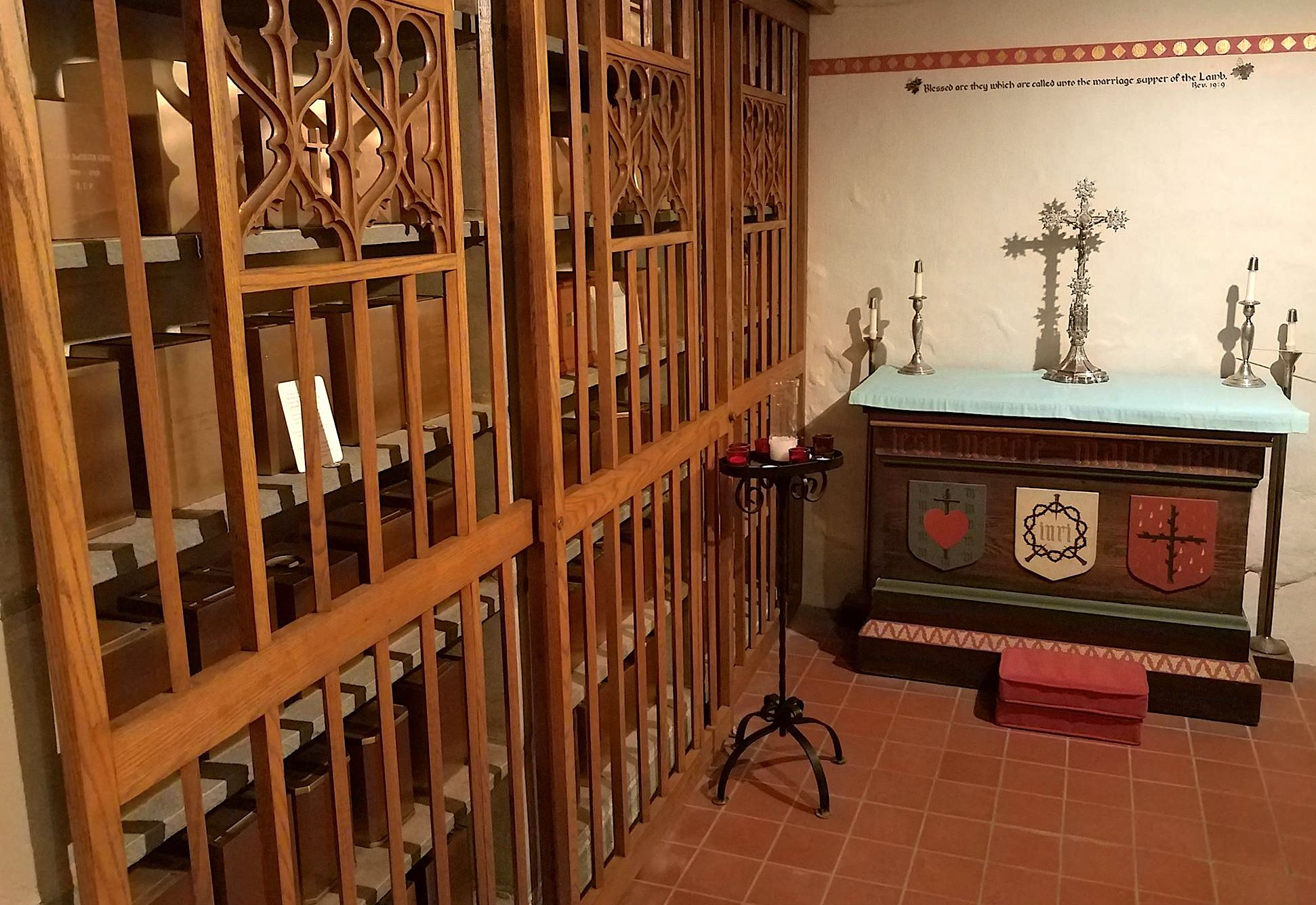
Columbarium and Funerary Chapel, Episcopal Church of the Good Shepherd (Rosemont, Pennsylvania), United States

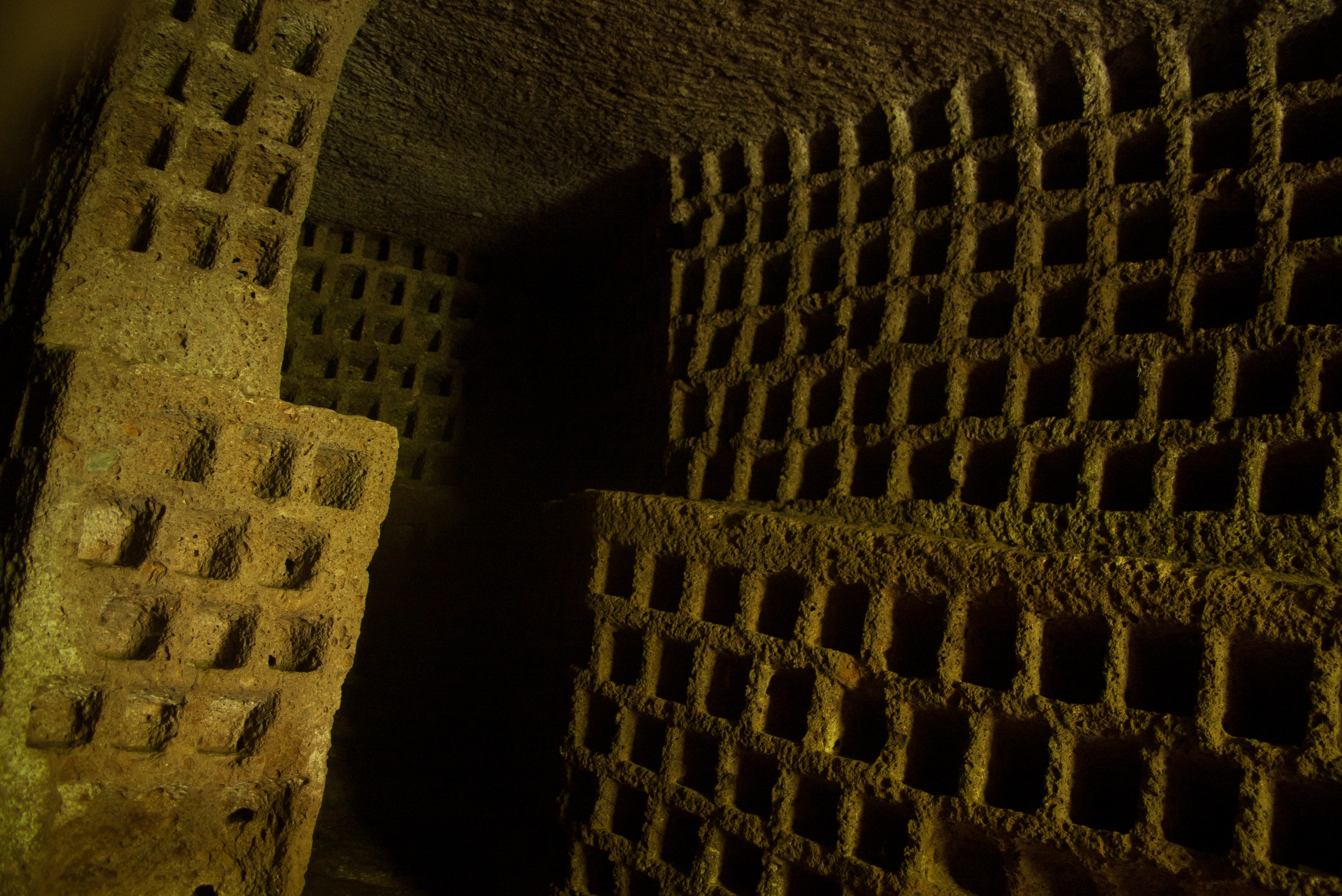
Etruscan columbarium at Cava Buia, Blera, Italy

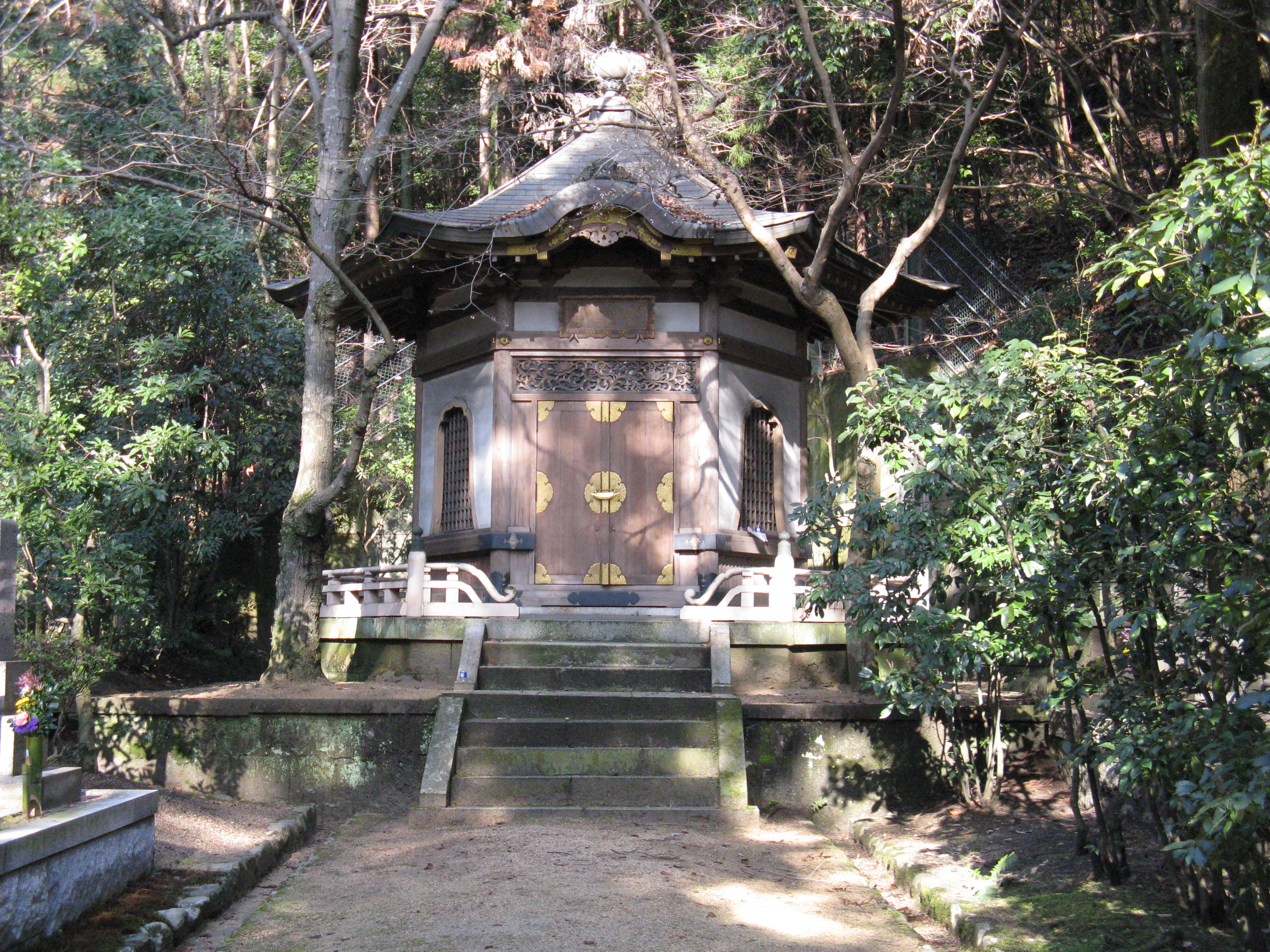
A traditional Japanese columbarium at the Takidani Fudōmyō-ō Temple, Osaka, Japan

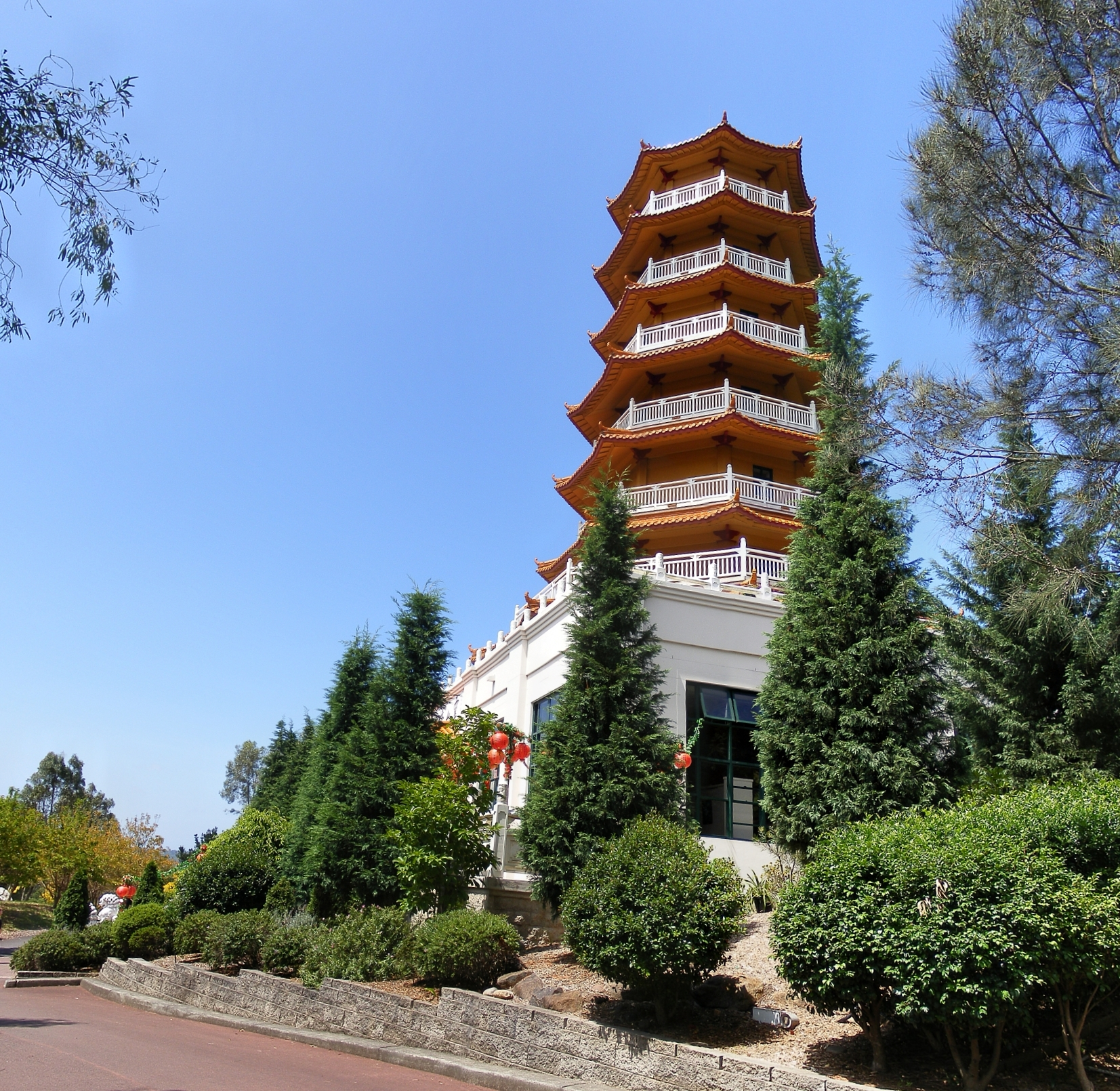
A modern Chinese-style columbarium at Nan Tien Temple in Wollongong, Australia

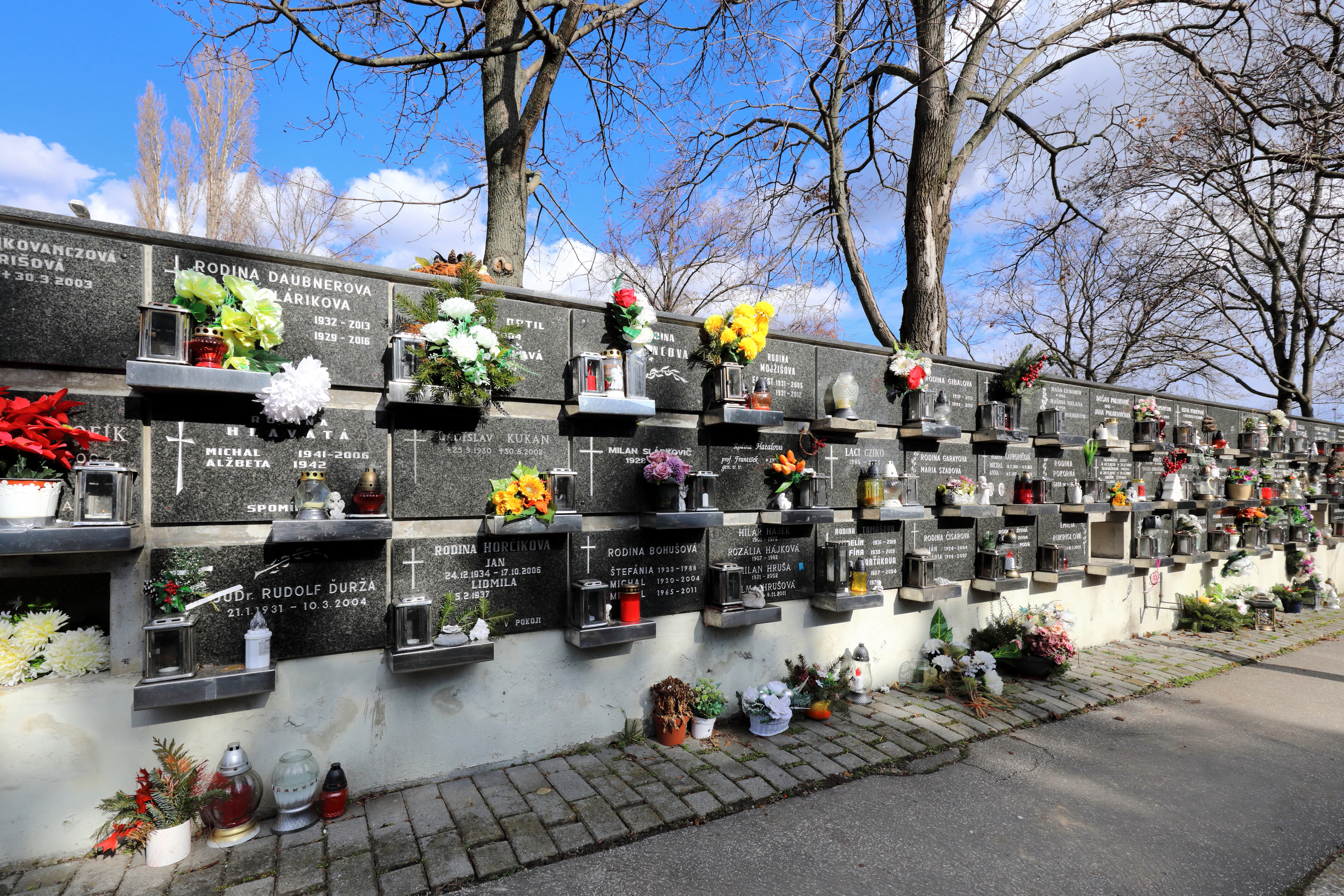
Columbarium wall at the Rača cemetery in Bratislava

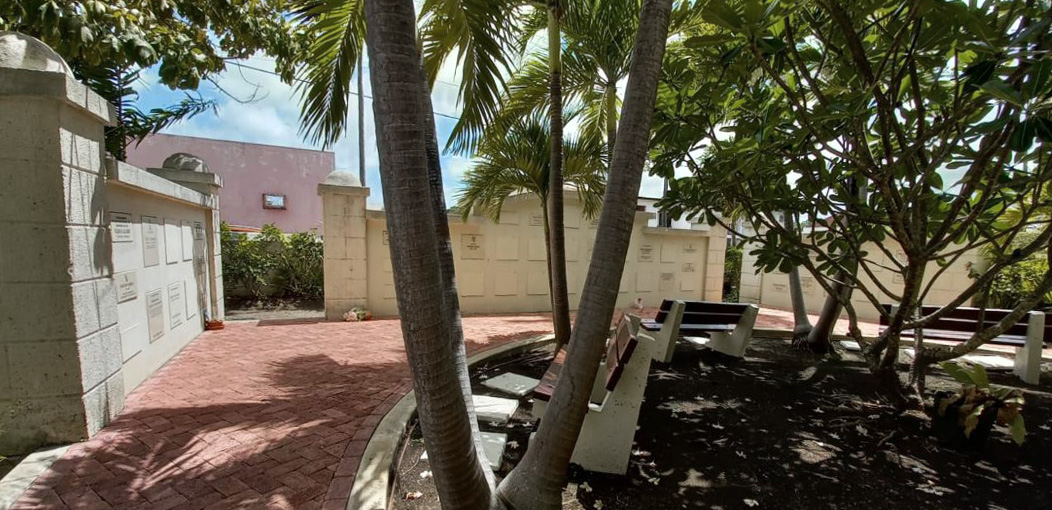
Columbarium at Hastings, Barbados

== See also ==
- Catacombs
- Charnel house
- Crypt
- Euphemism
- Grave
- Ossuary
- Reliquary
