= Resting place =

Resting place or Resting Place may refer to:

- Cemetery, where the remains of dead people are buried
- Rest area, a public facility next to a large highway
- Resting Place, a 1996 American TV movie
- "Resting Place", a Kim's Convenience episode, 2017

== See also ==
- No Resting Place, a 1951 British film
