= Old Gate =

Old Gate may refer to:

- Old Gate (Jerusalem), a gate in Jerusalem
- Old Gate (Speyer), a gate in Speyer, Germany
