= Teutonicus =

Teutonicus was a medieval Latin term equivalent to Theodiscus

- In classical Latin it was an adjective related to the Teutones

It was often used as a surname in the Middle Ages:

- Walerland Teutonicus - 13th century Lord Warden of the Cinque Ports
- Notker Teutonicus (950–1022) - monk and author
- Franco Teutonicus or Franco of Cologne - 13th century music theorist
- Theodoricus Teutonicus de Vrîberg or Theodoric of Freiberg (ca. 1250–ca. 1310) - Dominican friar and physicist
- Julianus Teutonicus or Julian of Speyer - 13th century Franciscan friar, composer, poet and historian
- Johannes Teutonicus or John of Wildeshausen (ca. 1180–1252) - Master General of the Dominican order
- Johannes Teutonicus Zemeke (d. 1245) - glossator on the Decretum Gratiani

Other uses include:

- Furor Teutonicus ("Teutonic Fury"), Latin phrase referring to the proverbial ferocity of the Teutones
- Mos Teutonicus - an embalming method
- Ordo Teutonicus - "German Order", The Teutonic Knights
