= Andrew Hughes (musicologist) =

English musicologist (1937–2013)

Andrew Hughes (August 3, 1937 – December 23, 2013) was an English musicologist. He was considered an expert in medieval music and specialized in the study of plainchant, particularly the Old Hall Manuscript and music of the rhythmical office.

== Biography ==
Andrew Hughes was born on August 3, 1937 in London, England. At a young age he moved with his family to rural Buckinghamshire. He grew up just outside of the village of Chalfont St Giles. As a teenager he attended the Merchant Taylors' School, Northwood. He won the Henry Hadow Scholarship which funded his education at Worcester College, Oxford. He graduated from there with an Honours BA in Music in 1960. He continued graduate studies at the University of Oxford where he wrote his doctoral dissertation on the Old Hall Manuscript under supervisor Frank Llewellyn Harrison. He earned both an MA and a Doctorate of Philosophy in 1964.

From 1962 to 1964 Hughes was a lecturer at Queen’s University, Belfast. After this he had a career as an academic in the United States, teaching on the music faculties of University of Illinois Urbana-Champaign from 1964 to 1967 and the University of North Carolina at Chapel Hill from 1967 to 1969. In 1969 he came to Canada to join the teaching staff of the University of Toronto (UT); becoming a full professor at UT in 1975 and later the higher position of University Professor in 1992. He was appointed a Fellow of Trinity College, Toronto in 1982, and he remained at UT until his retirement in 2004.

Hughes authored the book Manuscript Accidentals (1972) which examined the use and purpose of accidentals in the Old Hall Manuscript. He was the recipient of a Guggenheim Fellowship in 1973. He authored the manuals Medieval Music: the Sixth Liberal Art (1974 & 1980) and Medieval Manuscripts for Mass and Office: a Guide to their Organization and Terminology (1982). A UT research grant funded studies into the medieval music of the rhythmical office which Hughes undertook from 1976 to 1979. In 1987 he became a Fellow of the Medieval Academy of America (MAA), and later served as MAA's president in 2001-2002. The book of interdisciplinary essays, Music and Medieval Manuscripts: Paleography and Performance (2004, Routledge; later republished in 2017), was published as a festschrift in his honor.

Hughes died in Toronto, Canada on December 23, 2013.

== Selected writings ==
Books

- Hughes, Andrew (1964). English Sacred Music 1400–ca.1450 (PhD). Oxford University.
- —— (1972). Manuscript Accidentals: Ficta in Focus, 1350–1450. Musicological Studies and Documents. Vol. 27. Dallas: American Institute of Musicology. OCLC 607627.
- —— (1974). Medieval Music: the Sixth Liberal Art. Toronto: Toronto University Press. OCLC 876264172.
- —— (1982). Medieval Manuscripts for Mass and Office: a Guide to their Organization and Terminology. Toronto: Toronto University Press. OCLC 317518365.
- —— (1989). Style and Symbol: Medieval Music, 800–1453. Ottawa: Institute of Mediaeval Music. OCLC 21600576.

Articles

- Hughes, Andrew (1965). "Mensuration and Proportion in Early Fifteenth-Century English Music". Acta Musicologica. 37 (Fasc. 1/2): 48–61. doi:10.2307/932338. JSTOR 932338.
- —— (1965). "Continuity, Tradition and Change in English Music up to 1600". Music & Letters. 46: 306–315. JSTOR 732662.
- —— (May 1988). "Chants in the Rhymed Office of St. Thomas of Canterbur". Early Music. 16 (2): 185–202. doi:10.1093/earlyj/XVI.2.185.
