= Margarete Freudenthal-Sallis =

German-Israeli sociologist

Margarete Freudenthal-Sallis (1894–1984) was a German sociologist.

== Life ==
Margareta David was born to a Jewish family in 1894 (some sources say 1893) in Speyer. She started studying art history and then economics in 1914 but left university upon marriage in 1917. Aged 22, she married Berthold Freudenthal, a law professor twice her age. Initially lacking any practical knowledge of housekeeping, she became interested in understanding its history. After her husband's death she returned to university, studying under Karl Mannheim at Goethe-Universität in Frankfurt am Main. She completed a PhD in sociology in 1933 researching the changing role of women in the household economy.

Freudenthal later emigrated to Mandatory Palestine, where she remarried.

== Works ==
- Ich habe mein Land gefunden: autobiographischer Rückblick [I have found my country: an autobiographical review], Frankfurt am Main: Josef Knecht, 1977
- Gestaltwandel der städtischen, bürgerlichen und proletarischen Hauswirtschaft unter besonderer Berücksichtigung des Typenwandels von Frau und Familie, vornehmlich in Südwest-Deutschland zwischen 1760 und 1933. Teil 1: von 1760-1910 [Changes in the forms of urban bourgeois and proletarian household economies, with special attention to the typological changes of woman and the family, primarily in southwest Germany between 1760 and 1933. Volume 1: 1760-1910]. PhD thesis, Frankfurt am Main, 1933. Republished as Gestaltwandel der städtischen, bürgerlichen und proletarischen Hauswirtschaft zwischen 1760 und 1910. Frankfurt: Ullstein, 1986. With a foreword by Katharina Rutschky.
- Die Lilie des Scharon: von Palästina zum Staate Israel [The rose of Sharon: from Palestine to the State of Israel], Frankfurt am Main: Josef Knecht, 1982
