= Volker Straus =

Volker Straus (b. July 5, 1936 in Speyer, Germany – d. April 21, 2002 in Bilthoven, Netherlands) was one of the foremost Tonmeisters of the twentieth century. He sound-engineered some 590 albums – the vast majority uncredited – during his remarkable career, for many of the great artists. His last recording before his retirement was of soprano Jessye Norman performing the opening song at the 1996 Olympics.

== Biography ==
The majority of Straus' career was spent with the Philips label in the Netherlands. In that association, he engineered significant recordings of such artists as Sir Colin Davis, Claudio Arrau, Henryk Szeryng, Josef Krips, Alfred Brendel, Dietrich Fischer-Dieskau, the Beaux Arts Trio, Ingrid Haebler, Sir Neville Marriner, and - above all - the conductor Bernard Haitink. His decades of production engineering for Bernard Haitink's recordings with the Concertgebouw Orchestra of Amsterdam form an imposing and diverse body of discs documenting the mainstream symphonic repertory. Straus' production of Haitink's Mahler symphony interpretations with the Berlin Philharmonic, Haitink's Brahms cycle with the Boston Symphony, and Haitink's Bruckner performances with the Vienna Philharmonic are notable for their engineering as well as their musical excellence.

Volker Straus decided to be a producer at the age of eleven, when he went to a radio production facility and saw the technicians working with tapes. "I knew then I wanted to play with tapes," he once said. Straus was already a talented pianist and he also had strong mathematical skills. He started out producing operas in places like Innsbruck and Turin with first-rate lead singers and secondary orchestras. That was great for his career, he believed. "I learned all the problems on the ground floor," he would recall, "and once I recorded Aida with just 8 microphones."

Volker Straus had numerous quotes, and some are listed here.

- "Producing a good recording is just a matter of hard work. My preparation for a Mahler symphony will take about 50 hours." ^{1,2}
- "There is always somewhere something a trifle too sharp, flat, loud, soft, fast, slow, or insufficiently together. At any moment, a decision has to be made, if these small deviations are within the boundaries agreed upon with the conductor."^{1,2}
- "There has been a trend toward more charismatic conductors. This is in contrast to a master conductor like Haitink, who does not need to be considered charismatic because of his unique control of the metier itself. For record company marketers, the visual image has become far more important. They want handsome, young conductors who can speak 28 languages and know how to graciously thank God for their talents."^{1,2}

Among Straus's technical achievements was devising an electrical series connection of a side-by-side pairing of two Neumann microphones (omni and cardioid) to create a broad or wide cardioid directional characteristic as a spot microphone, known as the 'Straus Paket'.

Later in his career, teaching also became important to Volker Straus. He taught the Tonmeister craft at the College of Music ETI in Detmold, Germany and at the Royal Conservatory in The Hague (The Netherlands). Plans are underway to publish his authoritative text on both the technical and diplomatic aspects of the Tonmeister's role.

The stories about Straus' abilities to recognize an outstanding potential recording venue are legendary. Once he was asked to assess a church in Switzerland as a possible recording site. Straus walked into the church briskly and proceeded to its physical center. Then he stamped his foot on the floor just once, listened to the reverberation, and promptly walked out, saying. "This will do very nicely". According to those involved in the project, it did.
