= Speyer =

City in Rhineland-Palatinate, Germany

Speyer Schbaija (Palatine German)
- Town
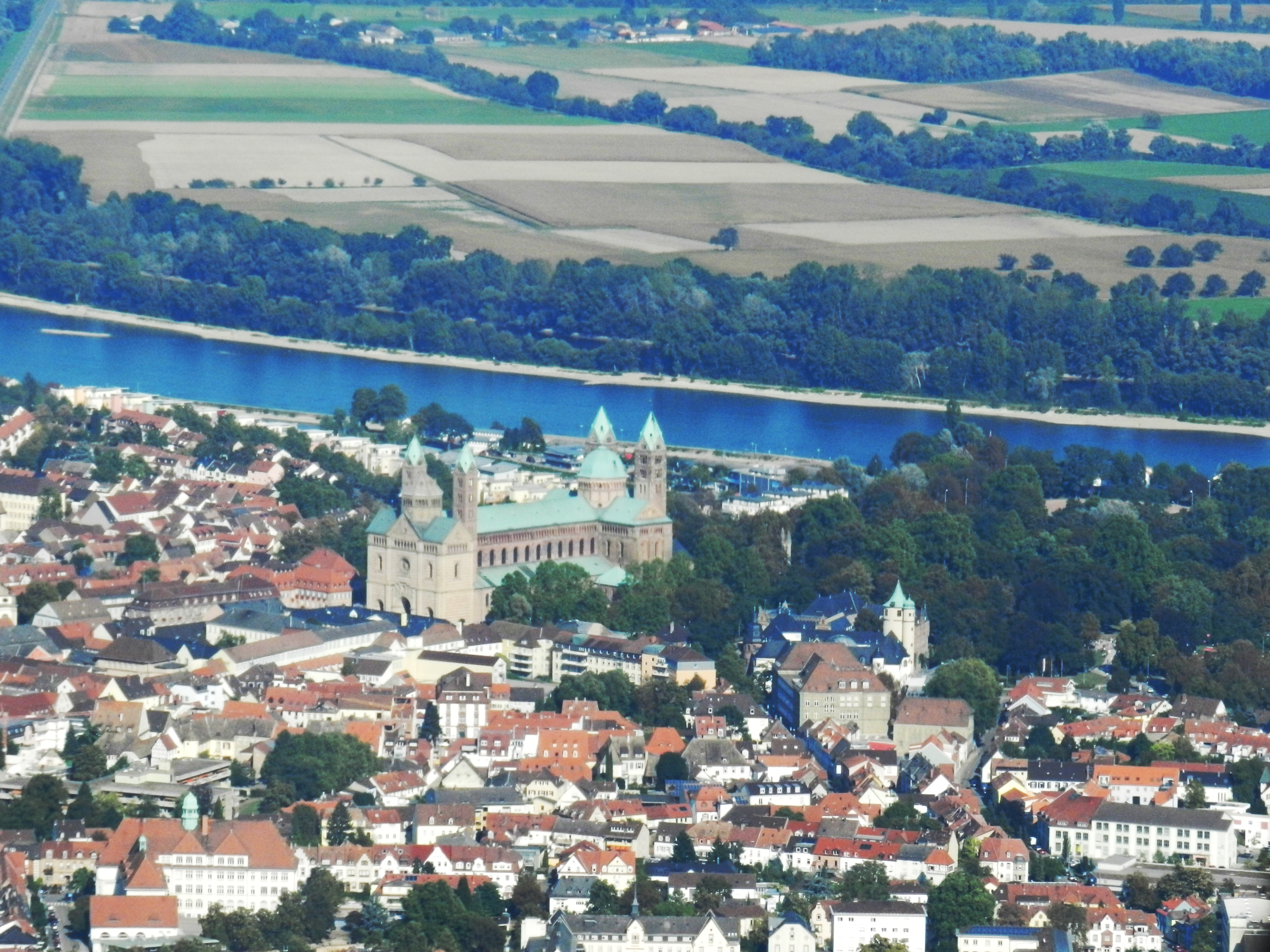
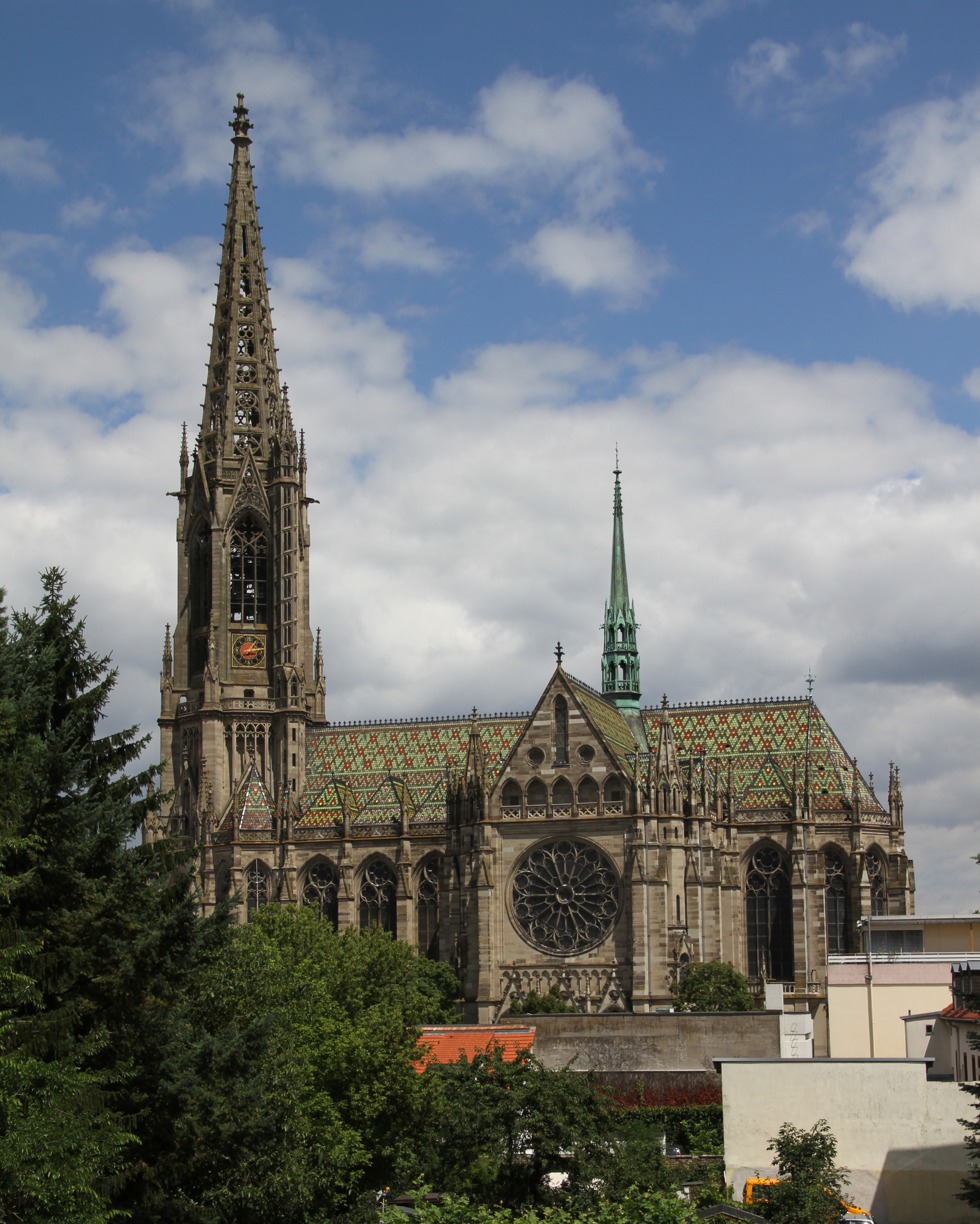
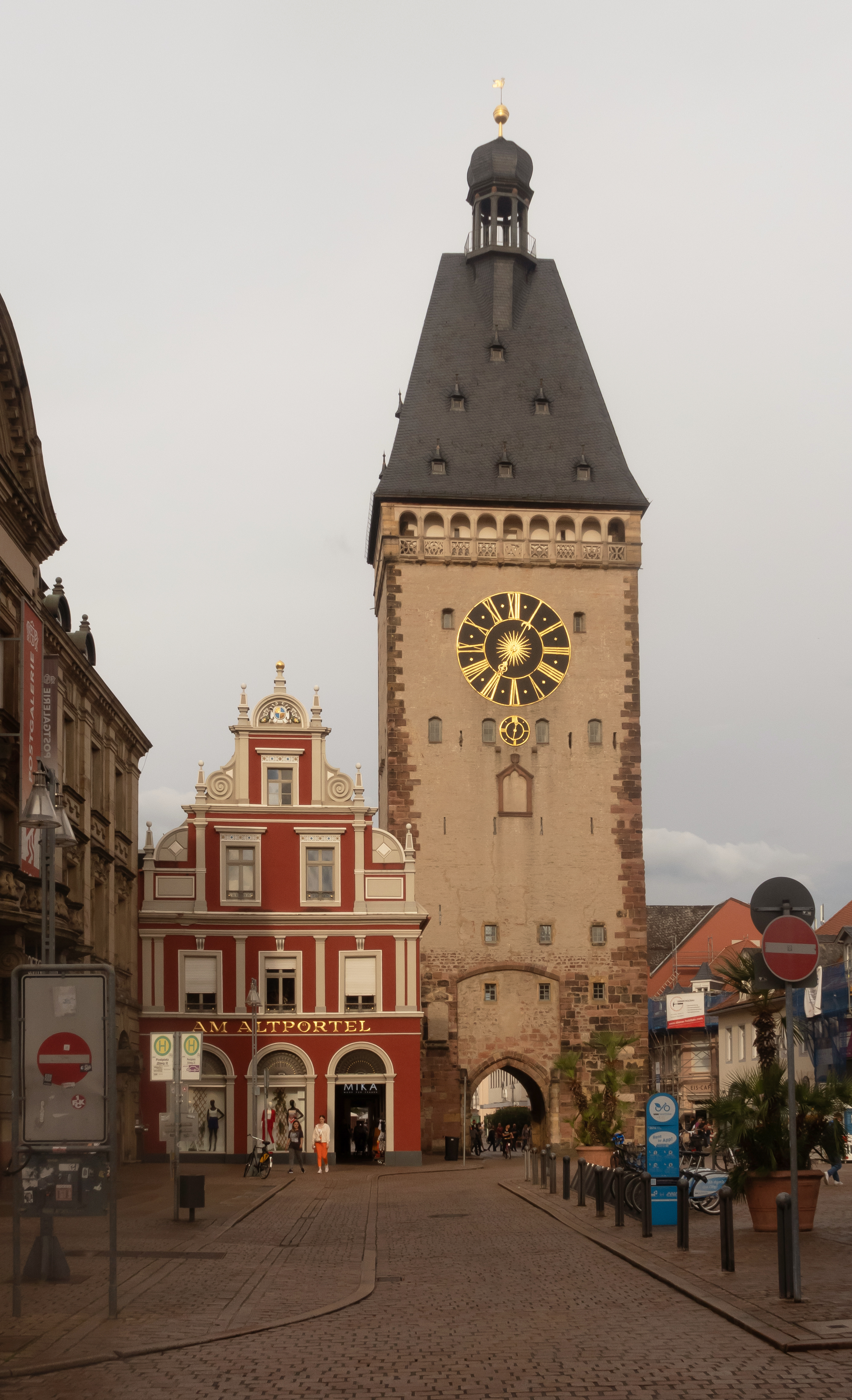
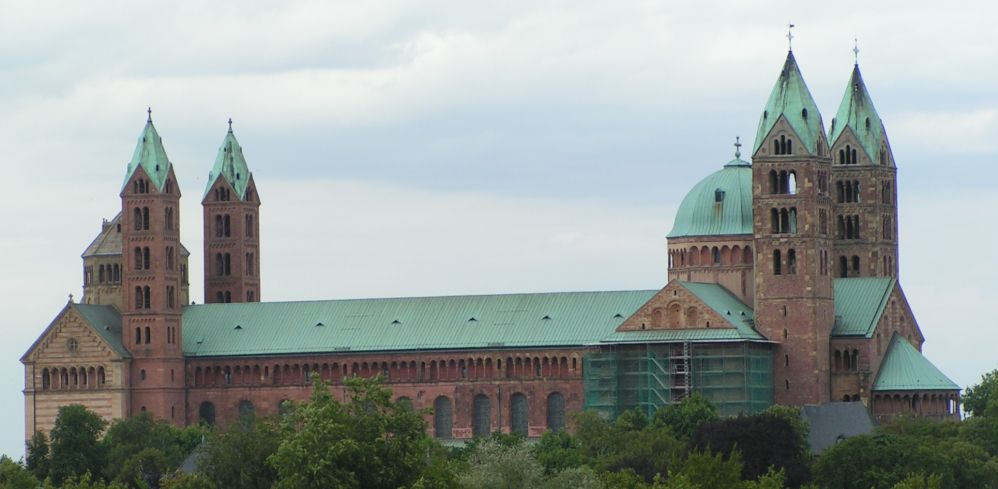
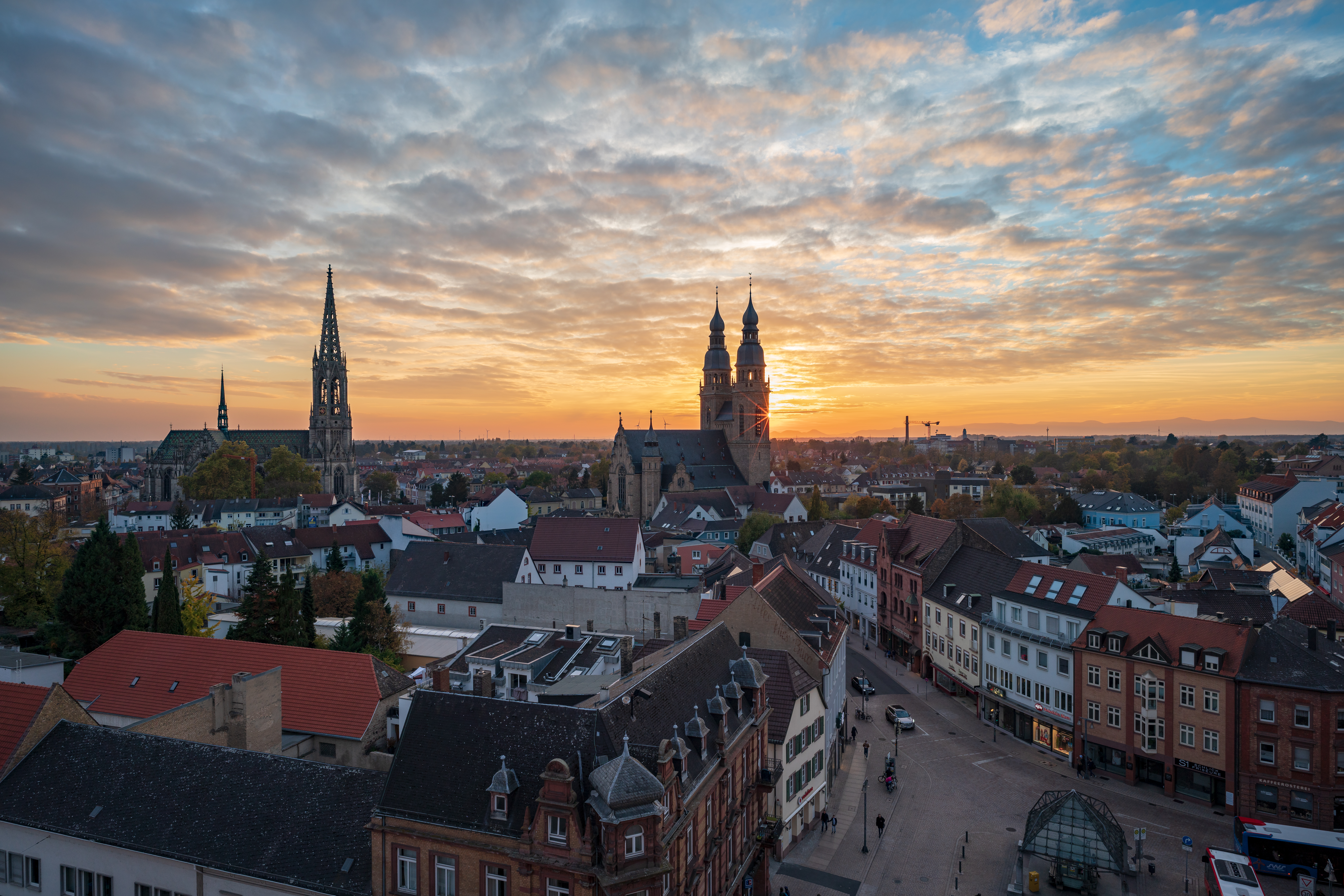
- Medieval centre Gedächtniskirche Old Gate Speyer Cathedral Old town skyline

- Flag Coat of arms
- Interactive map of Speyer
- Location within Germany Location within Rhineland-Palatinate
- Coordinates: 49°19′10″N 8°25′52″E
- Country: Germany
- State: Rhineland-Palatinate
- District: Urban district
- Subdivisions: 4 Stadtteile

Government
  - Mayor (2018–26): Stefanie Seiler (SPD)

Area
  - Total: 42.58 km^{2} (16.44 sq mi)
- Elevation: 92 m (302 ft)

Population (2025-12-31)
  - Total: 49,035
  - Density: 1,152/km^{2} (2,983/sq mi)
- Time zone: UTC+01:00 (CET)
  - Summer (DST): UTC+02:00 (CEST)
- Postal codes: 67346
- Dialling codes: 06232
- Vehicle registration: SP
- Website: speyer.de

UNESCO World Heritage Site
- Official name: ShUM Sites of Speyer, Worms and Mainz
- Type: Cultural
- Criteria: (ii)(iii)(iv)
- Designated: 2021
- Reference no.: 1636

Speyer (German: [ˈʃpaɪɐ], older spelling Speier; Palatine German: Schbaija), historically known in English as Spires, is a city in Rhineland-Palatinate in the western part of the Federal Republic of Germany with approximately 50,000 inhabitants. Located on the left bank of the river Rhine, Speyer lies 25 km (16 miles) south of Ludwigshafen and Mannheim, and 21 km (13 miles) south-west of Heidelberg. Founded by the Romans as a fortified town on the northeastern frontier of their empire, it is one of Germany's oldest cities. Speyer Cathedral, a number of other churches, and the Altpörtel ("old gate") dominate the Speyer landscape. In the cathedral, beneath the high altar, are the tombs of eight Holy Roman Emperors and German kings.

Speyer is one of the ShUM cities, which formed the centre of the Jewish community in northern Europe during the Middle Ages. The city's medieval Judenhof was made a UNESCO World Heritage Site in 2021. The cathedral is also a World Heritage Site, having been listed in 1981.

== Name ==
Speyer was known in the pre-Roman period as Noviomagus, a toponym of Celtic origin meaning "new field". The Romans called it Civitas Nemetum in reference to the Nemetes, a Germanic tribe who lived in the vicinity. The present name first appeared in the 7th century, as Spira. It referred originally to the Speyerbach, a tributary of the Rhine that has its mouth at Speyer, and likely represents a suffixed form of a Germanic verb meaning "spew, spit" (cf. German speien). The modern, diphthongised form is attested from the 14th century onwards.

== History ==
=== Timeline ===
- In 10 BC, the first Roman military camp is established (situated between the town hall and the episcopal palace), guarding the northeast frontier of the Roman Empire against Germanic barbarian tribes across the river to the east in Germania.
- In AD 150, the town appears as Noviomagus on the world map of the Greek geographer Ptolemy.
- In 346, a Western Christian / Roman Catholic bishop for the town is mentioned for the first time.
- 4th century, Civitas Nemetum appears on the Peutinger Map.
- 5th century, Civitas Nemetum is destroyed.
- 7th century, the town is re-established, and named Spira after a nearby Frankish settlement.
- In 1030, emperor Conrad II starts the construction of Speyer Cathedral, today one of the UNESCO World Heritage Sites. Also in the 11th century, the first city wall was built.
- In 1076, emperor Henry IV of the Holy Roman Empire embarks from Speyer, his favourite town, for Canossa.
- In 1084, establishment of the first Jewish community in Speyer.
- In 1096, as Count Emicho's Crusader army on their journey in the First Crusade (also known as the People's Crusade) to the Muslim-occupied Holy Land, raged across the Rhineland slaughtering innocent Jewish communities in the Rhineland massacres. Speyer's Bishop John, with the local leader Yekutiel ben Moses, manages to secure the community's members inside the episcopal palace and later leads them to even stronger fortifications outside the town. It was ruled that anyone harming a Jew would have his hands chopped off.
- In 1294, the Roman Catholic bishop lost most of his previous rights, and from now on Speyer is a Free Imperial Town of the Holy Roman Empire.
- In 1349, the Jewish community of Speyer was wiped out in a persecution pogrom.
- Between 1527 and 1689, Speyer was the seat of the Imperial Chamber Court.
- During the 16th century Protestant Reformation era in 1526, at the first Diet of Speyer (1526) interim toleration of Lutheran teaching and worship is decreed by Holy Roman Emperor Charles V.
- In 1529, at the second Diet of Speyer (1529) the Evangelical Lutheran states and supporting princes / electors of the Holy Roman Empire protest against the anti-Reformation resolutions (19 April 1529 Protestation at Speyer, hence the beginnings of the use of the descriptive term "Protestantism" / "Protestants").
- In 1635, Marshal of France Urbain de Maillé-Brézé, together with Jacques Nompar de Caumont, duc de La Force, conquers Heidelberg and Speyer at the head of the Army of Germany.
- In 1689, the town was heavily damaged by invading Royal French troops.
- Between 1792 and 1814, Speyer during the long period of the French Revolutionary Wars and subsequent Napoleonic Wars is under French occupation and jurisdiction under the French First Republic and following First French Empire of Napoleon Bonaparte (Emperor Napoleon I), continuing earlier during the 18th century, by Royal French troops of the Kingdom of France, after the Battle of Speyerbach, a century before in 1703 during the War of the Spanish Succession (1701–1714).
- In 1816, (following the fall of Napoleon), Speyer becomes the seat of administration of the Palatinate and of the government of the Rhine District of the Kingdom of Bavaria (later called the Bavarian Palatinate), and remains so for 129 years until the end of World War II in 1945.
- In 1861, at the Speyer Cathedral, Edward VII was introduced to his future wife Alexandra by Crown Princess Victoria.
- Between 1883 and 1904, the Memorial Church was built in remembrance of the Protestation of 1529 at the Diet of Speyer.
- In 1947, during post-World War II western Allied Powers-occupied Germany, the State Academy of Administrative Science was founded (later renamed German University of Administrative Sciences Speyer).
- In 1990, Speyer celebrates its 2000th anniversary, on the eve of a reunified Federal Republic of Germany, following the ebbing close of the Cold War.

== Main sights ==
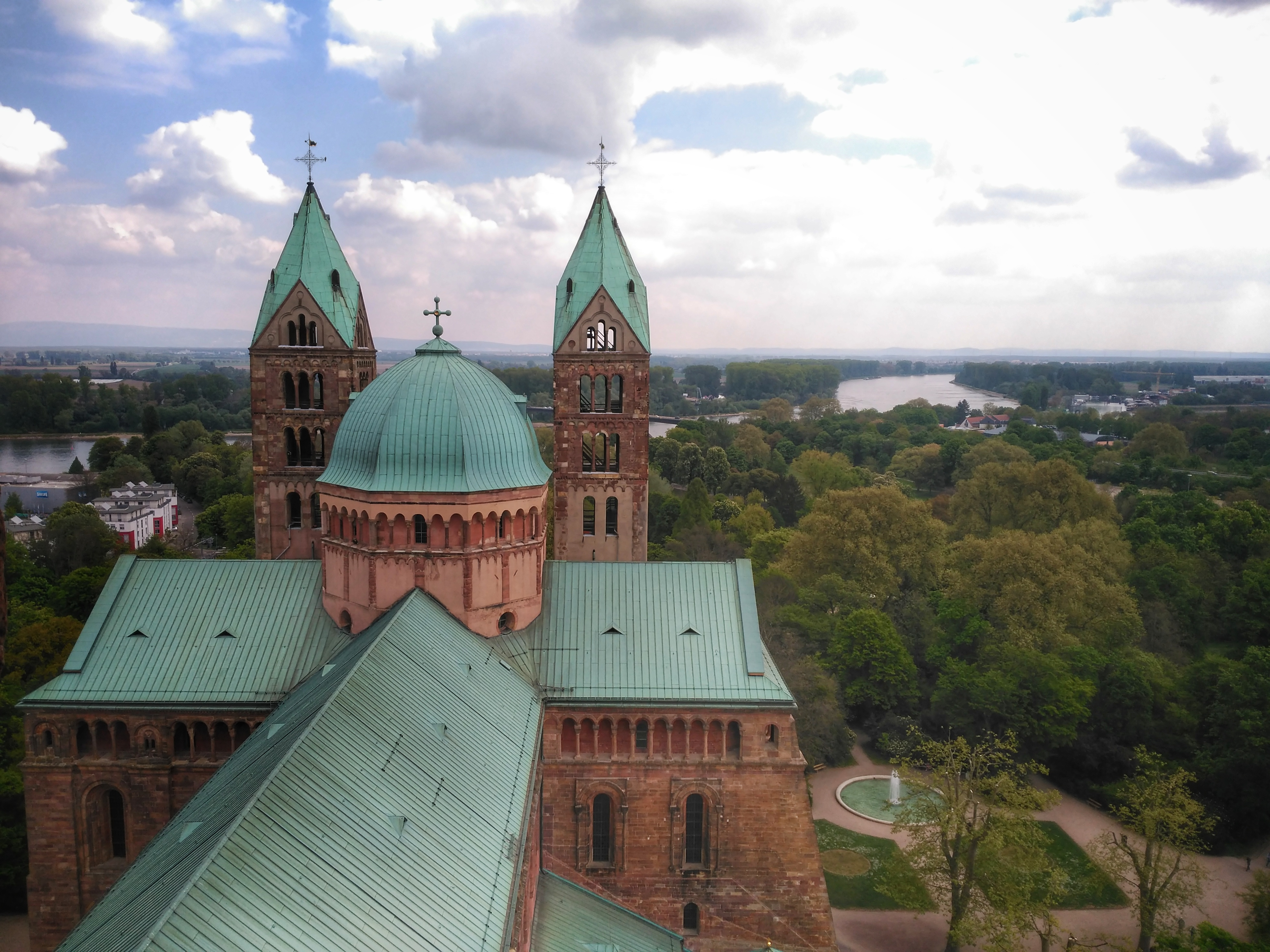
View of the river Rhine from the top of the Speyer Cathedral

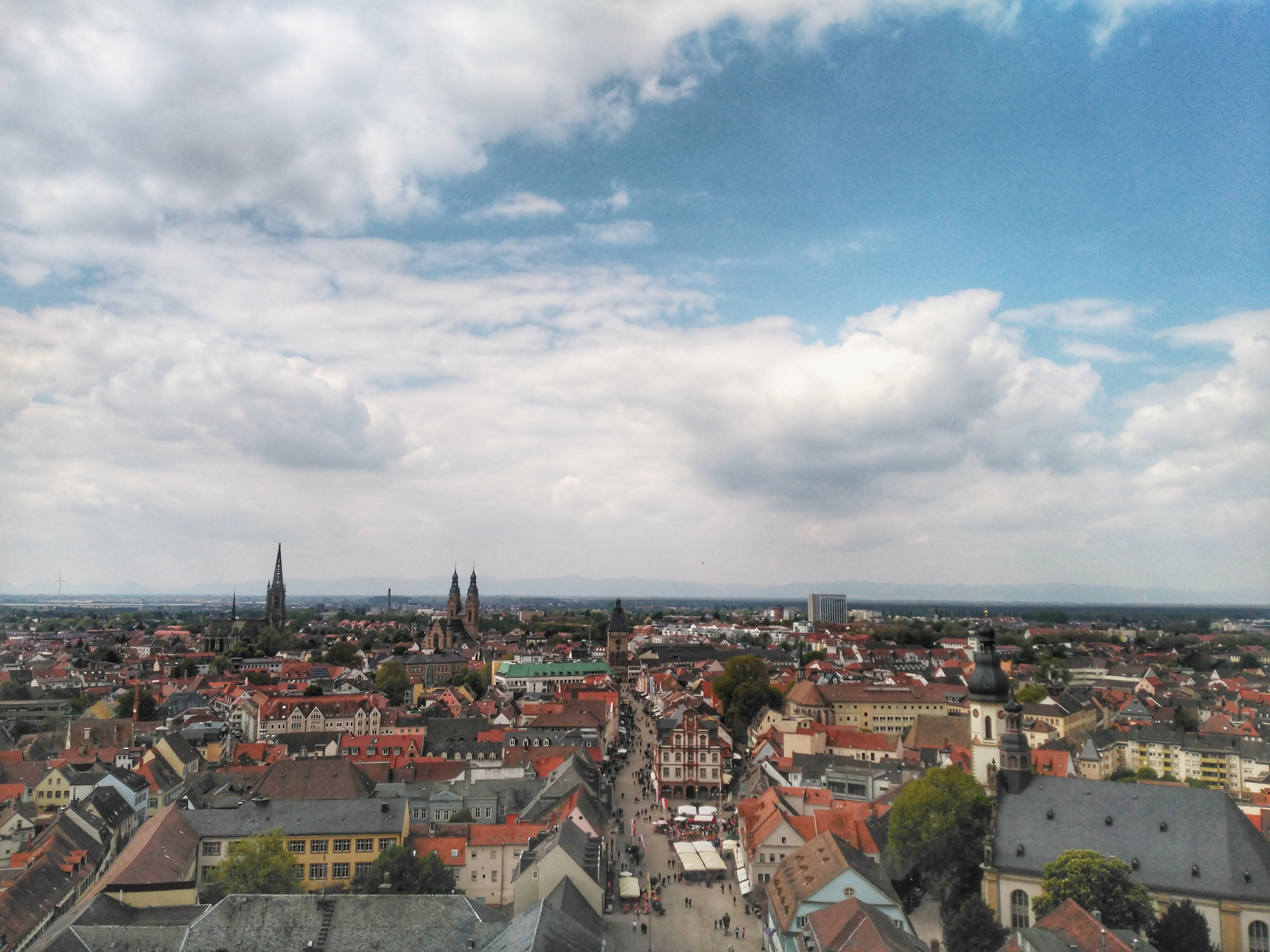
View of Speyer from its cathedral

- Cathedral
- Altpörtel – Old Town Gate
- Gedächtniskirche – Memorial church
- Dreifaltigkeitskirche – Trinity church
- Jewish courtyard (Judenhof Speyer) – remnants of medieval synagogue and intact mikve, UNESCO World Heritage Site
- Technikmuseum Speyer – Transportation Museum
- Historical Museum of the Palatinate

== Transportation ==
Speyer lies on the Schifferstadt-Wörth railway and offers hourly connections to Karlsruhe and cities in the Rhine-Neckar area (of which Speyer is also a part).

Speyer Airfield (German: Flugplatz Speyer) (ICAO: EDRY) is a general aviation airfield located 4 km south of the central business district of the city of Speyer.

== Mayors ==
Since 1923 the mayor was a Lord mayor.

- Philipp Lichtenberger (1855–1918) (1904–1911)
- Ernst Hertrich (1911–1914) (first full-time mayor)
- Otto Moericke (1880–1965) (1917–1919)
- Karl Leiling (?–?) (1919–1943)
- Rudolf Trampler (1898–1974) (1943–1945)
- Karl Leiling (?–?) (1945–1946)
- Hans Hettinger (?–?) (1946)
- Paul Schaefer (?–?) (1946–1949)
- Paulus Skopp (1905–1999) (1949–1969)
- Christian Roßkopf (born 1930) (1969–1995)
- Werner Schineller (born 1948) (1995–2010)
- Hansjörg Eger (born 1964) (2011–2018)
- Stefanie Seiler (born 1983) (since 2018)

== Twin towns – sister cities ==
Speyer is twinned with:

- Spalding, United Kingdom, since 1956; discontinued 2021
- Chartres, France, since 1959
- Kursk, Russia, since 1989
- Ravenna, Italy, since 1989
- Gniezno, Poland, since 1992
- Yavne, Israel, since 1998
- Rusizi District, Rwanda, since 1982/2001
- Ningde, China, since 2013
- Chichester, United Kingdom, since 2023

== Notable people ==
=== Born before 1900 ===
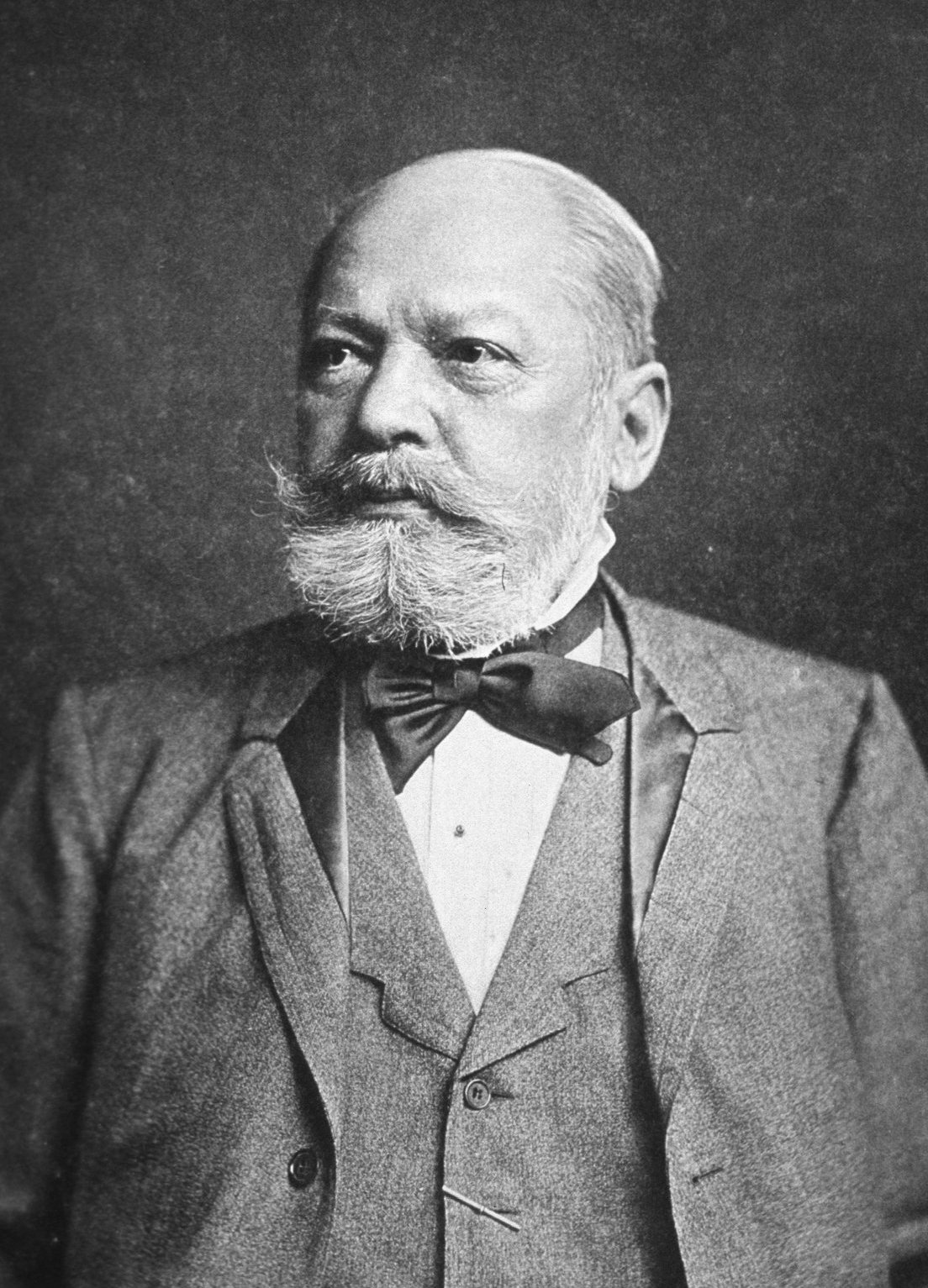
Carl Jakob Adolf Christian Gerhardt

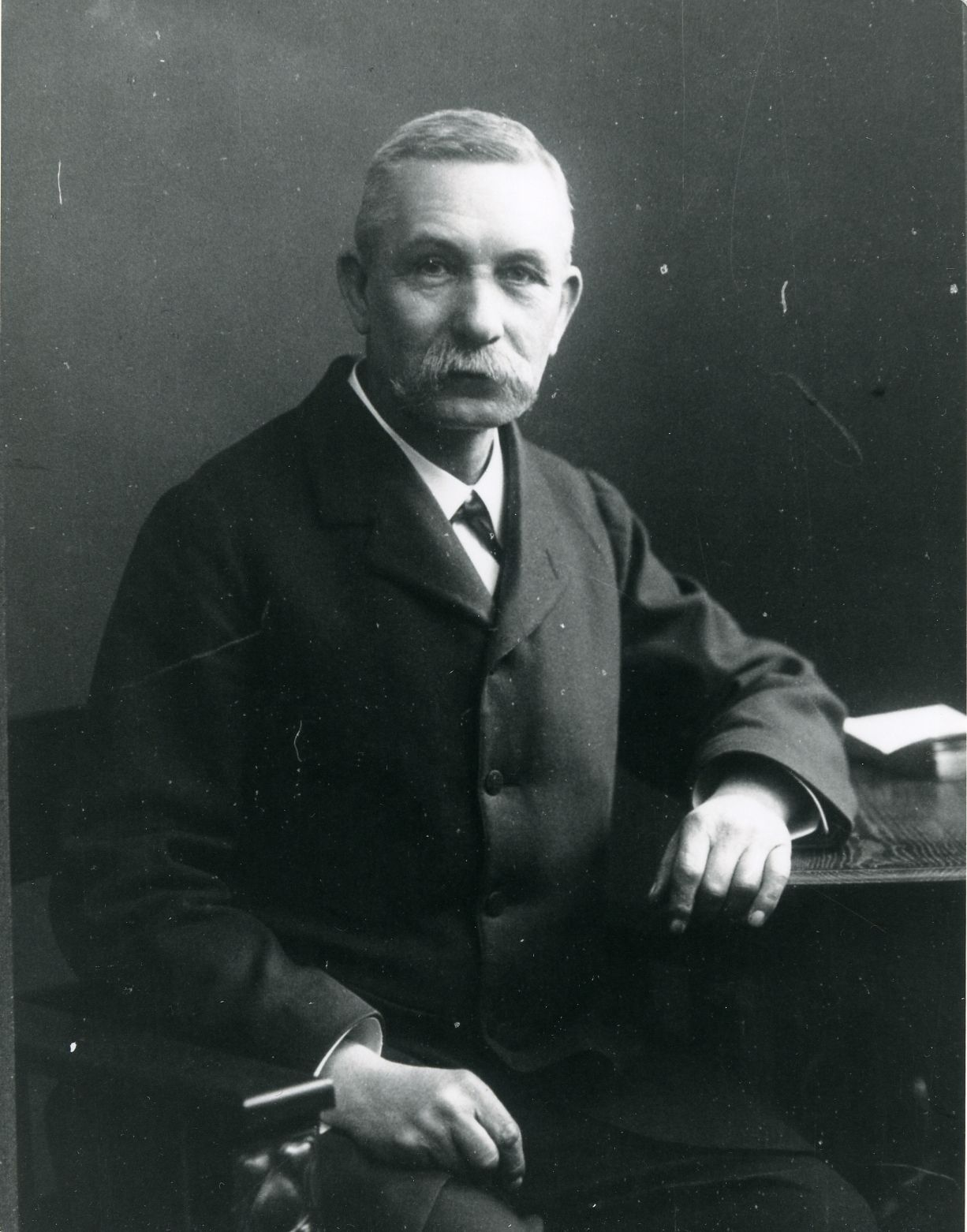
Wilhelm Meyer around 1895

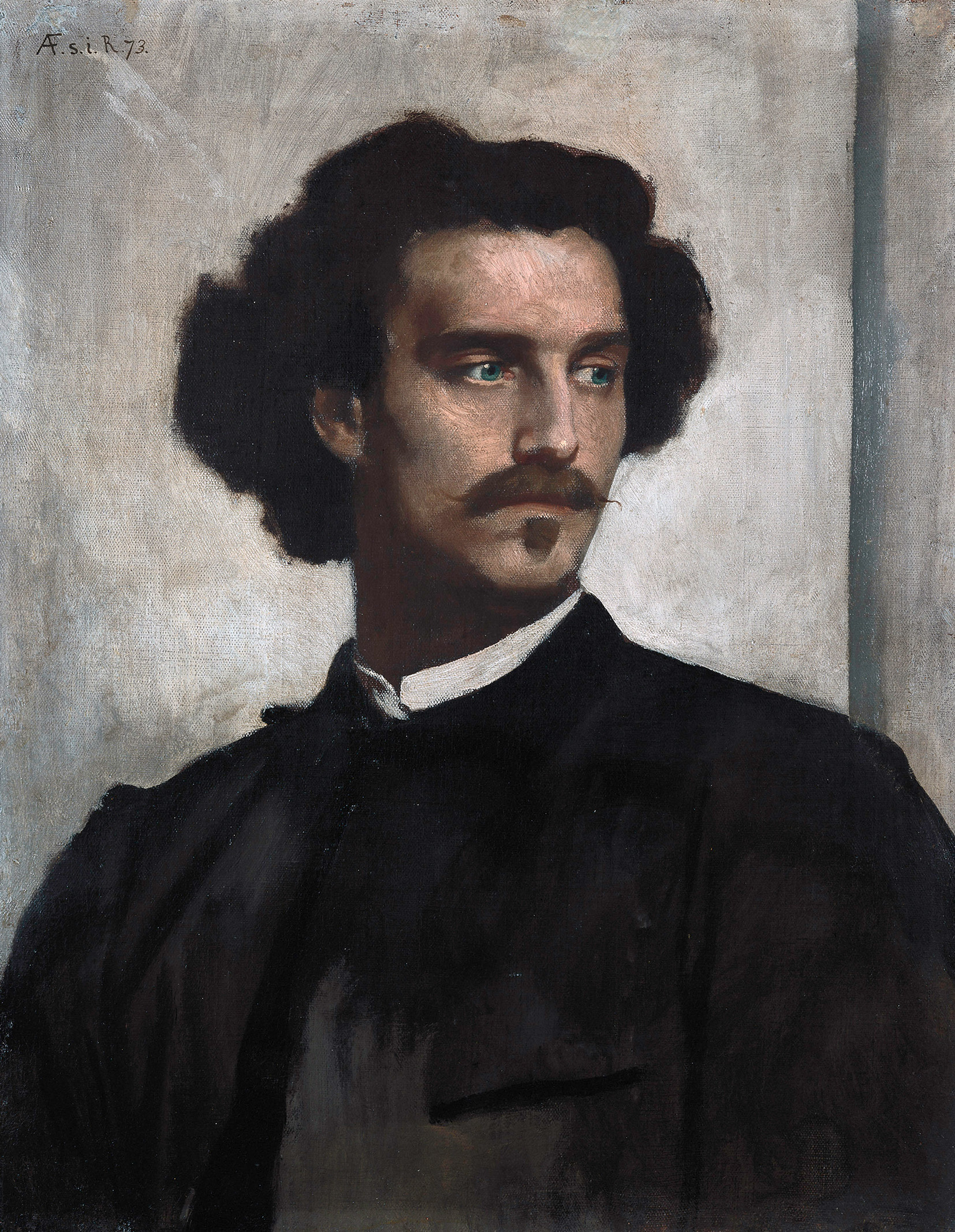
Anselm Feuerbach (self-portrait, 1873)

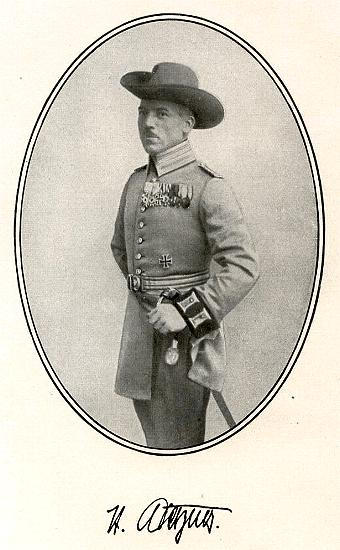
Hermann Detzner, 1921

- Samuel of Speyer (after 1096–death unknown), Exeget of Torah and Midrash
- Judah ben Samuel of Regensburg (1140–1217), scribe and philosopher
- Julian of Speyer (before 1225– ~ 1250), medieval choir master, composer and poet from the Roman Catholic Order of the Franciscans
- Gabriel Biel (~ 1415–1495), scholastic philosopher
- Dietrich Gresemund (1477–1512), author
- Georg von Speyer (1500–1540), conquistador/ explorer for the Kingdom of Spain / Spanish Empire in the Americas
- Egon VIII of Fürstenberg-Heiligenberg (1588–1635), Reichsgraf of Fürstenberg-Heiligenberg
- Johann Joachim Becher (1635–1682), German physician, alchemist, precursor of chemistry, scholar and adventurer
- Moritz Georg Weidmann (1658–1693), publisher and bookseller
- Adolf von Dalberg (1678–1737), Prince of Fulda
- Simha of Speyer (13th century) German rabbi and tosafist. He was one of the leading signatories of the Takkanot Shum.
- Philipp Hieronymus Brinckmann (1709–1760), landscape and historical painters as well as copper cutters
- Johann Martin Bernatz (1802–1878), landscape painter
- Anselm Feuerbach (1829–1880), German painter
- Carl Jakob Adolf Christian Gerhardt (1832–1902), German physician
- Henry Villard (1835–1900), German-American journalist, (reporting as a war correspondent for the Chicago Tribune in the American Civil War (1861–1865) and in Europe during the Austro-Prussian War of 1866, then publisher of the New York Evening Post newspaper and The Nation magazine and finally President (railroad executive) for the trans-continental Northern Pacific Railroad.
- Hermann von Stengel (1837–1919), Kingdom of Bavaria Administrative Officer in the German Empire
- Wilhelm Meyer (philologist) (1845–1917), classical philologist, mediavist and librarian
- Karl Heinrich Emil Becker (1879–1940), general of the artillery, ballist and defense scientist, in the German Empire (Second Reich) / Republic of Germany (Weimar Republic) / Nazi Germany (Third Reich)
- Hans Purrmann (1880–1966), painter, graphic artist, art writer and collector
- Hermann Detzner (1882–1970), leader of the German Schutztruppe in the German Empire overseas colony German New Guinea in the southwest Pacific Ocean
- Karl-Adolf Hollidt (1891–1985), Army officer (Generaloberst) and war criminal
- Margarete Freudenthal-Sallis (ca.1893–1984), German-Jewish sociologist of the changing role of women in home economics
- George Waldbott (1898–1982), German-American physician

=== Born after 1900 (20th century) ===
- George John Dasch (1903–1992), World War II spy who foiled terrorist attacks in the United States by Nazi Germany
- Jakob Brendel (1907–1964), wrestler
- Karl Haas (1913–2005), German American music educator and radio presenter
- Helmut Bantz (1921–2004), gymnast
- Alfred Cahn (1922–2016), German musician and composer
- Edgar E. Stern (born 1926), clinical social worker and author of The Peppermint Train: Journey to a German-Jewish Childhood
- Gabriel Kney (born 1929), Canadian pipe organ builder
- Karl Hochreither (1933–2018), German organist and musicologist
- Volker Straus (1936–2002) German tonmeister
- Jürgen Brecht (born 1940), fencer
- Wolf Frobenius (1940–2011), musicologist
- Gerhard Vollmer (born 1943), physicist and philosopher
- Jürgen Creutzmann (born 1945), politician (FDP)
- Hans-Joachim Lang (born 1951), journalist, Germanist, historian and honorary professor
- Axel Schimpf (born 1952), Vice Admiral of the German Navy of the Federal Republic of Germany
- Eberhard Bosslet (born 1953), artist
- Kay Friedmann (born 1963), footballer
- Markus Kranz (born 1969), football player
- Christoph Bechmann (born 1971), German field-hockey player
- Anke Vondung (born 1972), opera singer
- Daniel Born (born 1975), politician
- Ralf Schmitt (born 1977), football player
- Simone Weiler (born 1978), swimmer
- Jochen Kühner (born 1980), rower
- Martin Kühner (born 1980), rower
- Matthias Langkamp (born 1984), football player
- Christian Reif (born 1984), long jumper
- David McCray (born 1986), basketball player
- Florian Krebs (born 1988), football player
- Sebastian Langkamp (born 1988), footballer
- Lars Stindl (born 1988), German footballer
- Elias Harris (born 1989), German international basketball player
- Jonas Marz (born 1989), footballer
- Gianluca Korte (born 1990), footballer
- Raffael Korte (born 1990), footballer
- David Jahn (born 1990), racing driver

== See also ==
- Technikmuseum Speyer
- German University of Administrative Sciences Speyer
- Speyer line
- History of the Jews in Speyer
- Shapiro
