= Jewish courtyard, Speyer =

UNESCO World Heritage Site
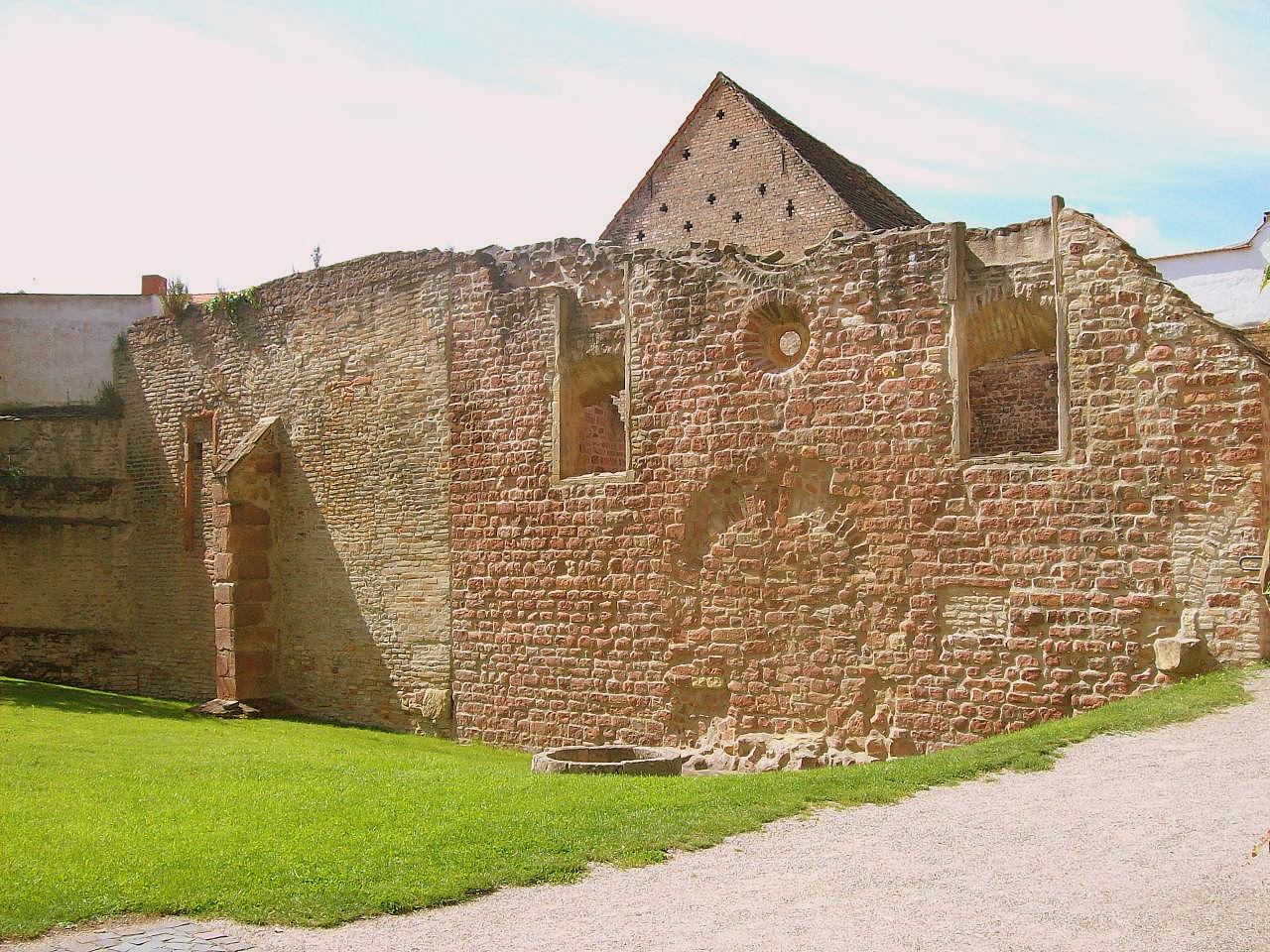
- Exterior walls of the frauenschul (left) and synagogue (right)

- Location within Germany Location within Rhineland-Palatinate
- Location: Speyer
- Part of: ShUM Sites of Speyer, Worms and Mainz
- Criteria: ii, iii, vi
- Reference: 1636-001
- Inscription: 2021 (44th Session)
- Website: Official website
- Coordinates: 49°18′58″N 8°26′22″E

The Judenhof or Jewish courtyard is an archaeological site in Speyer, Germany, consisting of a ruined medieval synagogue and several associated buildings. Built in stages between 1104 (when the synagogue was consecrated) and the 14th century, the courtyard contains some of the oldest and best-preserved Jewish architecture in northern Europe. It was added to the UNESCO World Heritage List in 2021, along with Jewish sites in Worms and Mainz (which, together with Speyer, form the ShUM cities, the cradle of Ashkenazi culture).

== Description ==
The Judenhof consists of the remains of a synagogue, its courtyard, a frauenschul for the use of women, and a yeshiva for teaching and studying, as well as an intact mikvah for ritual washing. The synagogue, courtyard, and mikvah were constructed in the early 12th century using sandstone, and the frauenschul and yeshiva were built out of brick in the 13th and 14th centuries. The synagogue was built in the Romanesque style and is the oldest example of the window arrangement that would become commonplace in Ashkenazi architecture, with arched windows surrounding a central round window. When it was remodelled, it retained most of its Romanesque features. The frauenschul, attached to the south side of the synagogue, was built in high Gothic style with a ribbed vault ceiling. The north and east walls of the yeshiva are the only above-ground aspect that still exist today. However, it is clear that the yeshiva was built in a similar style to the frauenschul.

Located to the east of the synagogue, the mikvah was built in the Romanesque style and contains elaborate sculpting and masonry. In particular, the anteroom overlooking the ritual bath contains intricate stonework, with a four-part window wall and ornate capitals. The same stonemasons who built the synagogue and mikvah also likely worked on the Christian churches and cathedrals in Speyer.

== History ==
In the late 11th century, Jews fleeing persecution in the town of Mainz began to take refuge in Speyer. In 1084, the Bishop of Speyer, Rüdiger Huzmann, issued a letter of protection for the fledgling Jewish community, intending to grow the economy of Speyer. This protection was later expanded by Henry IV, Holy Roman Emperor in 1090, beginning a "golden age" of Judaism in Speyer.

The oldest building in the Judenhof is the synagogue, which was consecrated on 21 September 1104. The first documented mention of the mikvah was in 1126, making it the earliest documented mikvah in Europe, and its subterranean components have been nearly unmodified for centuries. In 1196, the synagogue was burnt in a pogrom and was subsequently reconstructed. In the mid-13th century, the synagogue was renovated in Gothic style and the frauenschul was built next to it. Finally, in the mid-14th century, the yeshiva was constructed.

The Jewish community in Speyer existed until the beginning of the 16th century. The exact date and circumstances of its dissolution are unknown. From at least 1529, the synagogue was used as a municipal armory. It burned down in 1689, during the Nine Years' War. The courtyard was then used for housing livestock, and later divided into residential allotments. The city of Speyer purchased the site in 1999 and removed the modern buildings that had accumulated there, exposing the medieval fabric.

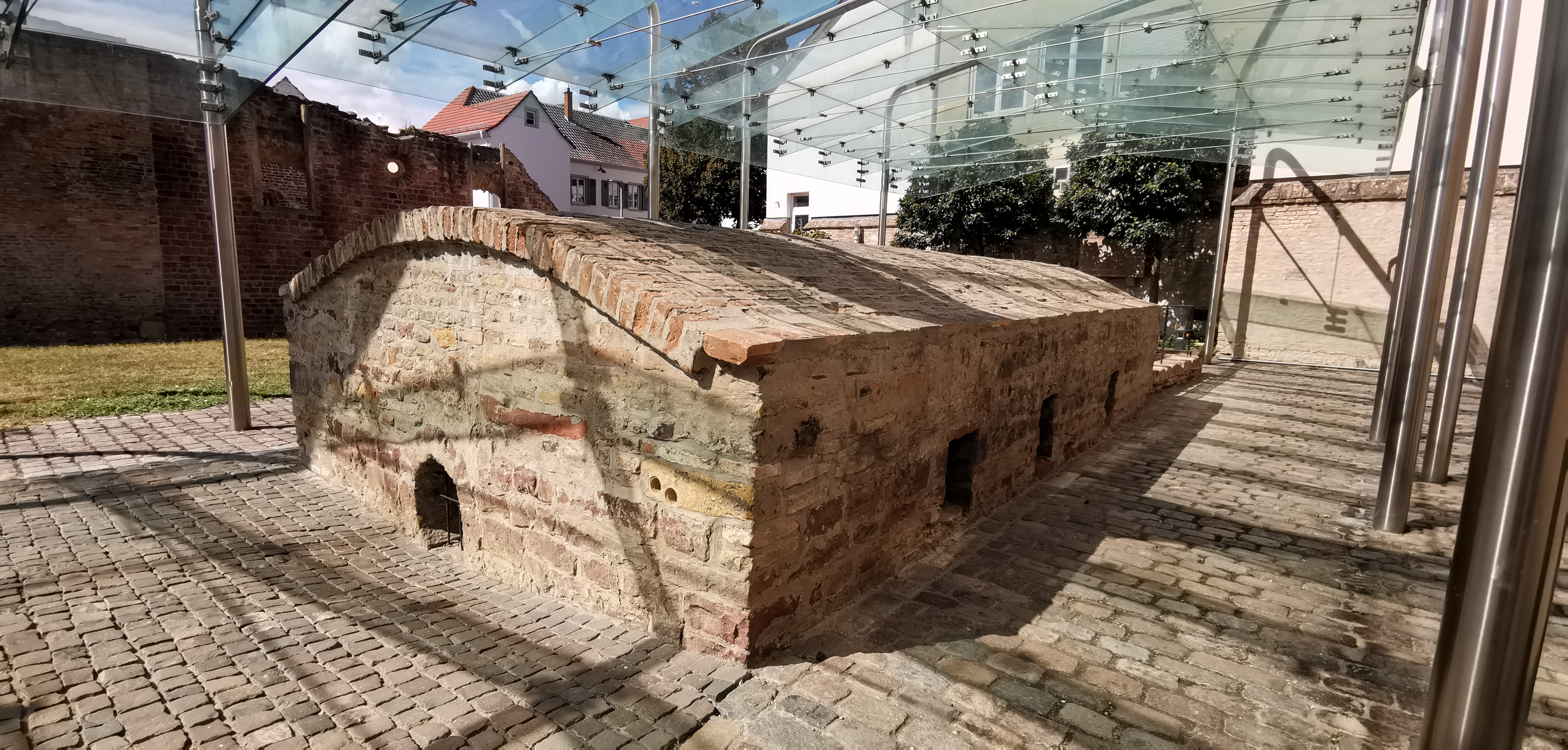
The mikvah

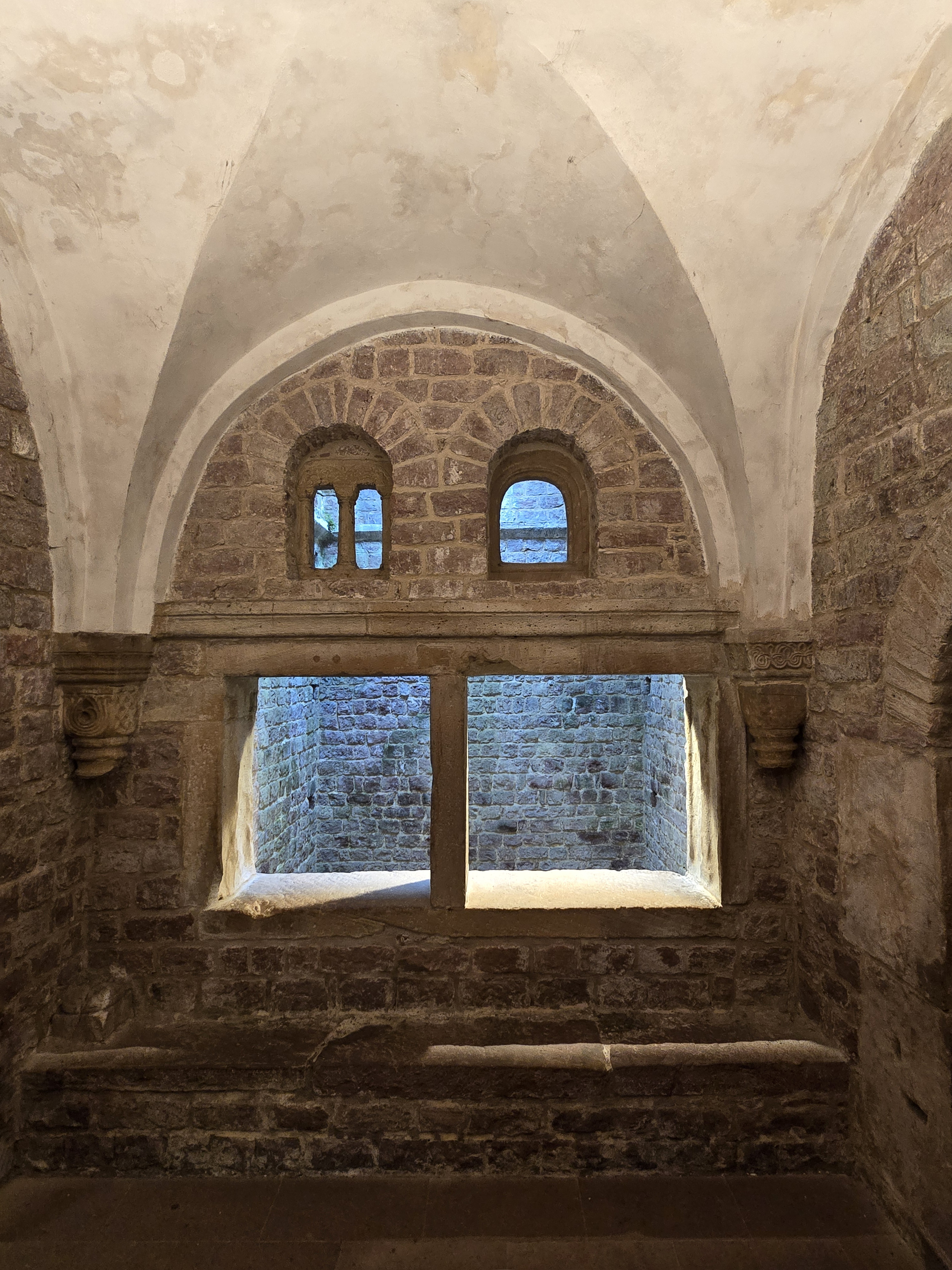
Interior of the mikvah

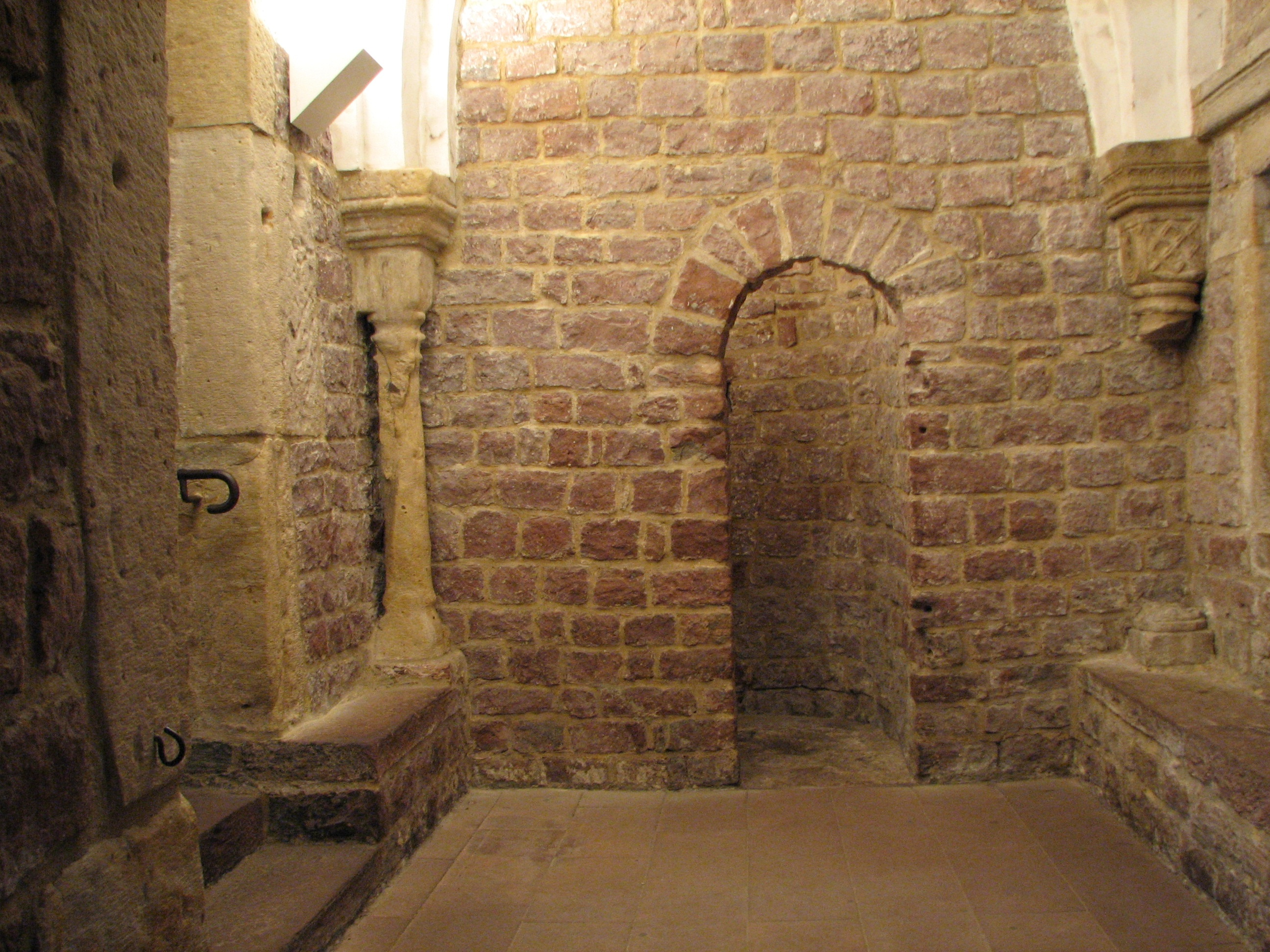
Interior of the mikvah

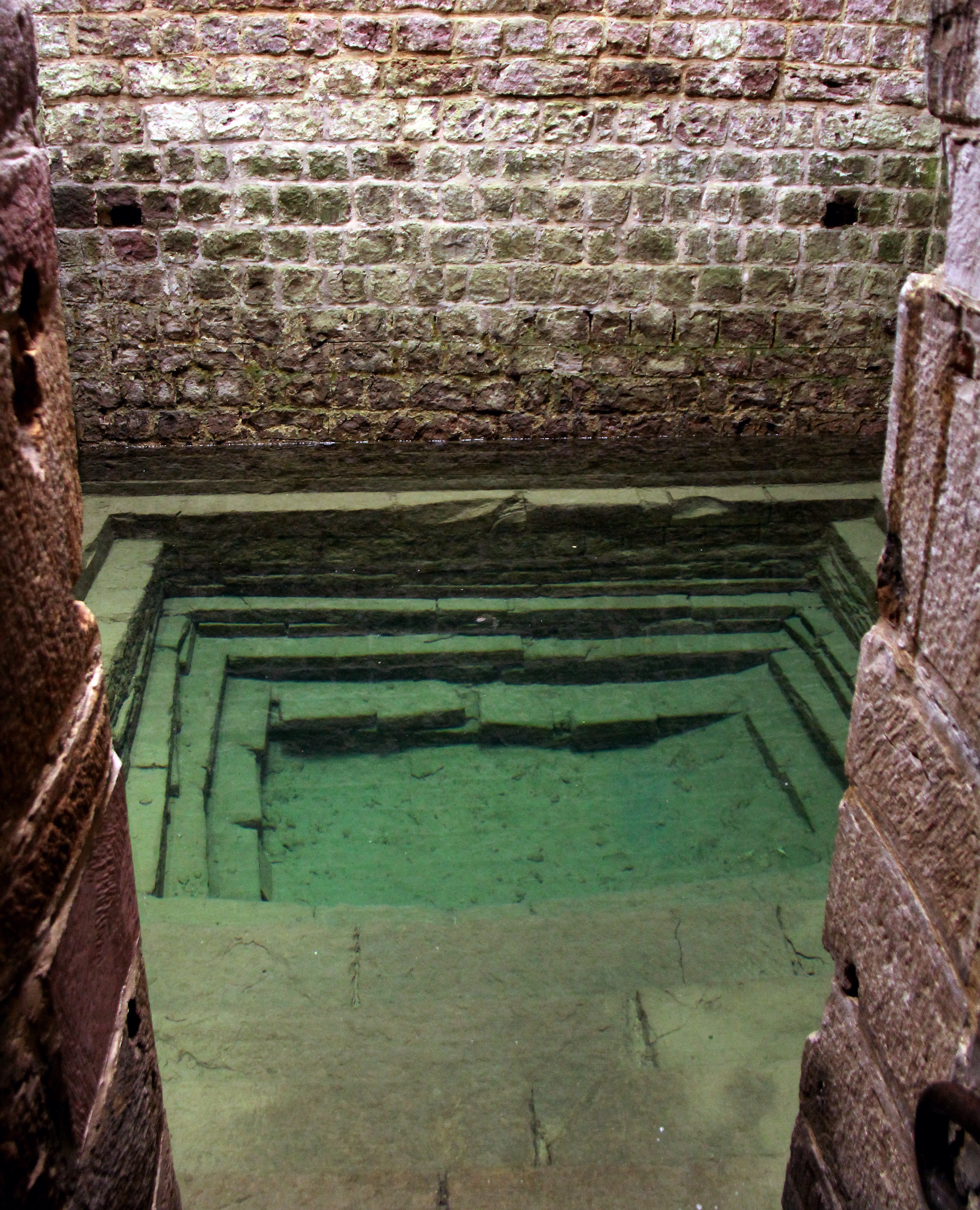
Interior of the mikvah
