= Julian of Speyer =

German Franciscan composer, poet and historian

Julian of Speyer (Latin: Julianus Teutonicus; died c. 1250), also known as Julian of Spires, was a German Franciscan composer, poet and historian of the thirteenth century.

Born in Speyer, Julian studied at the University of Paris and was the musical director for the royal chapel during the reigns of Philip Augustus and Louis VIII of France. Eventually, he left to become a member of the newly founded Order of St Francis, but exactly when is not known.

In 1227, Julian accompanied Brother Simon Angelicus to Germany, when he was made Provincial of Germany by the General Chapter of Assisi. It is probable that he was present at the translation of St. Francis at Assisi in May 1230. Afterwards, he lived in Paris again at the great convent of the Minorites, where he was choir-master as well as corrector mensae (who oversees the reading in the refectory).

Although in the Middle Ages, Julian of Speyer was held in high respect as a composer and writer of rhymed offices, he was almost forgotten until the end of the nineteenth century. It is certain that he composed the rhymed Office (historia) of St. Francis of Assisi (written between 23 February 1229 and 4 October 1235), as well as that of St. Anthony of Padua, who was canonized on 30 May 1232 (composed just after 1241).

Both these musical, as well as poetical, masterpieces are still used by the Franciscans. These works are distinguished for the harmony, rhythm, and rhyme of the verses, and for their sublime expressiveness as musical compositions. Only a few sentences in the third nocturn (the antiphons) were written by Pope Gregory IX and the cardinals; the rest is entirely Julian's composition.

Even outside the Franciscan Order the rhythmic structure has often been copied, with whole verses being frequently taken (especially from the Historia rhythmica of St. Francis) and set to Julian's melodies without any changes. It is not known how much of the poetic narrative of St. Dominic (d. 1221), used on his feast by both Franciscans and Dominicans, belongs to Julian of Speyer. Some portions at least of the mass formula of Sts. Francis and Anthony are undoubtedly his musical and poetical compositions. Only in the turn of the century was Julian recognized as the author of the Legenda S. Francisci and of the Vita ab auctore anonymo of St Anthony of Padua.

== Links ==
- Julian of Speyer, newadvent.org. Accessed 23 February 2024.
