= Old Gate (Speyer) =

Medieval gate in Germany

Coordinates: 49°19′03″N 8°25′56″E

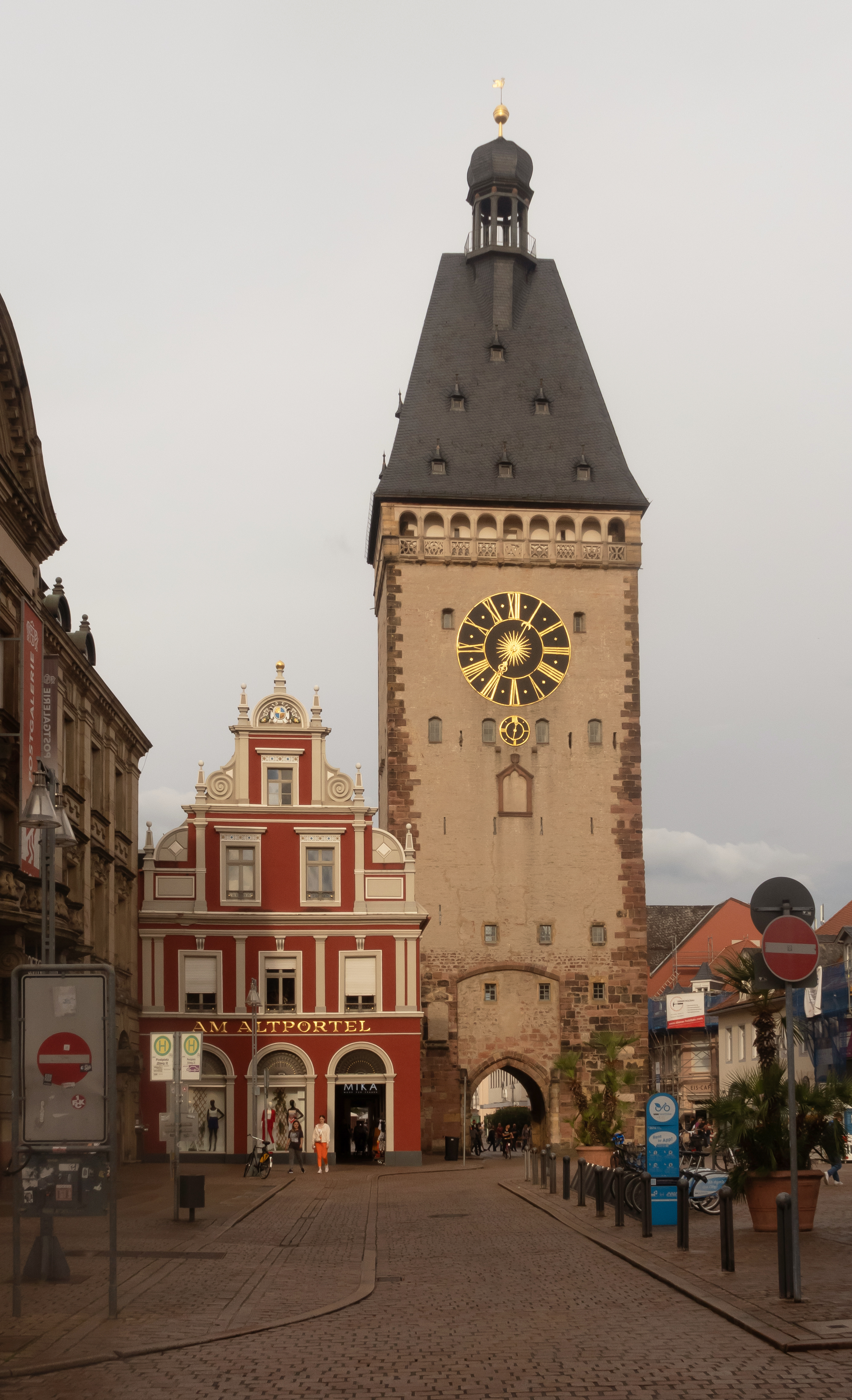
View from west

The Old Gate (German: Altpörtel) is the medieval west city gate of Speyer, and is one of the original 68 towers in the old walls and gates. Today it is one of the largest (55 metres or 180 feet tall) and most architecturally significant of the remaining city gates in Germany.

== History ==
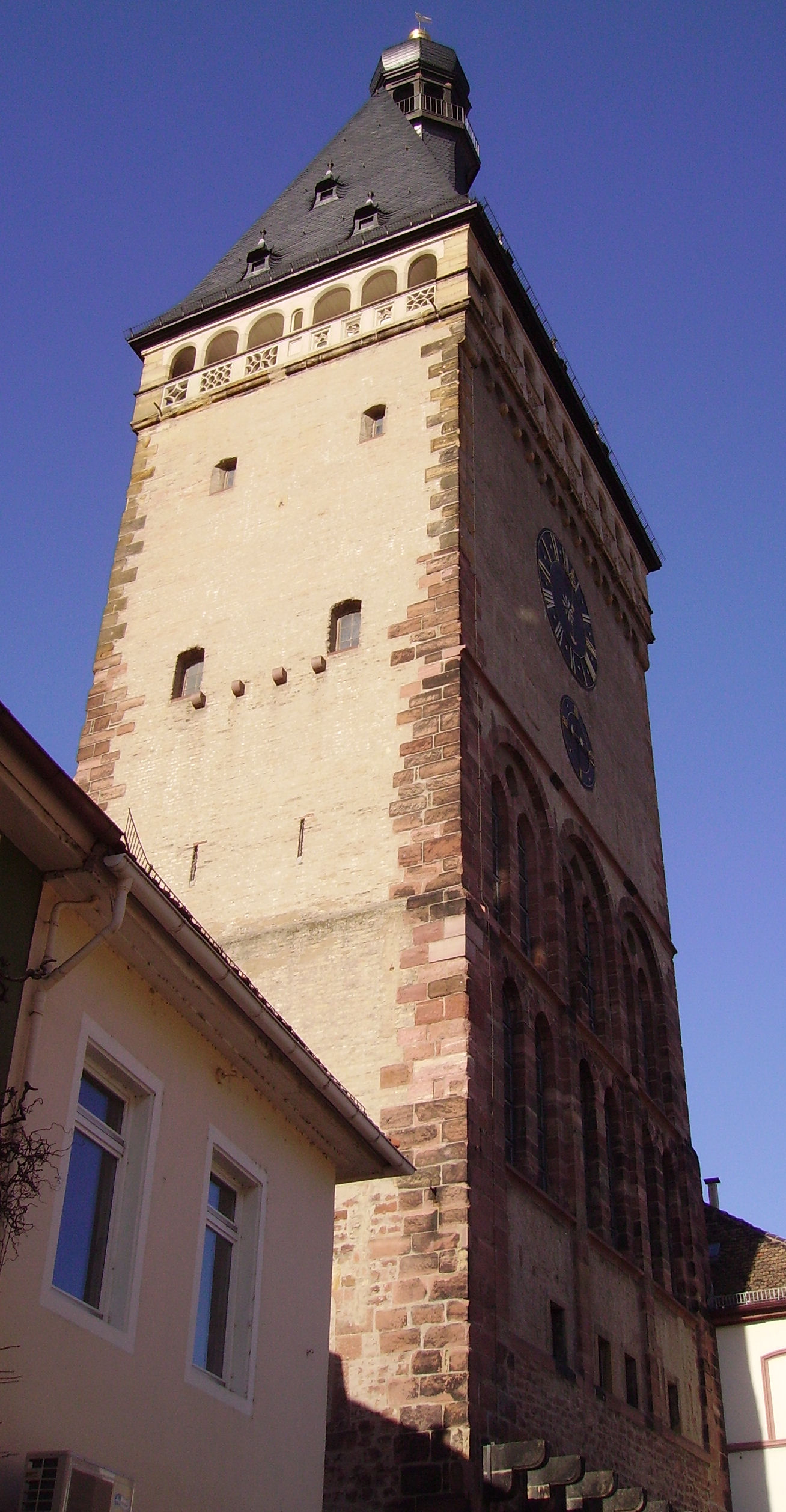
View from south

The Old Gate was built between 1230 and 1250 on the ruins of a previous tower. The bottom of the 13th-century tower remains as the foundation but, in 1511, Speyer's mayor ordered that the tower be rebuilt, so the top portion is newer. It was completed in 1514. It was originally built as an exterior gate, connecting the old town with the suburb of St. Gilgenvorstadt. A 20-metre-high (66 ft) roof was added in 1708.

The tower narrowly survived the destruction of Speyer in 1689, during the War of the Grand Alliance. French troops had placed explosives in the tower and were preparing to demolish it when the Prior of the nearby Carmelite monastery warned Marshal Duras that the tower's collapse might endanger the monastery and Duras' headquarters, which had been established nearby. When Duras responded that his soldiers knew how to demolish the building without danger, the entire Carmelite community knelt in front of the French troops with their burning firebrands, to plead for the tower to be spared. "Our monastery is old and weak," the Prior pleaded with Duras. "If the towers fall, ... the rotten walls ... would be rocked from the enormous mass of falling stones, and therefore collapse. So please have compassion and spare the tower." After pondering for a few minutes, the Marshal commanded the Carmelites to rise. "Stand up children, the tower shall stand." While the Old Gate was spared, the city of Speyer and the cathedral were left in a heap of rubble.

== Significance ==
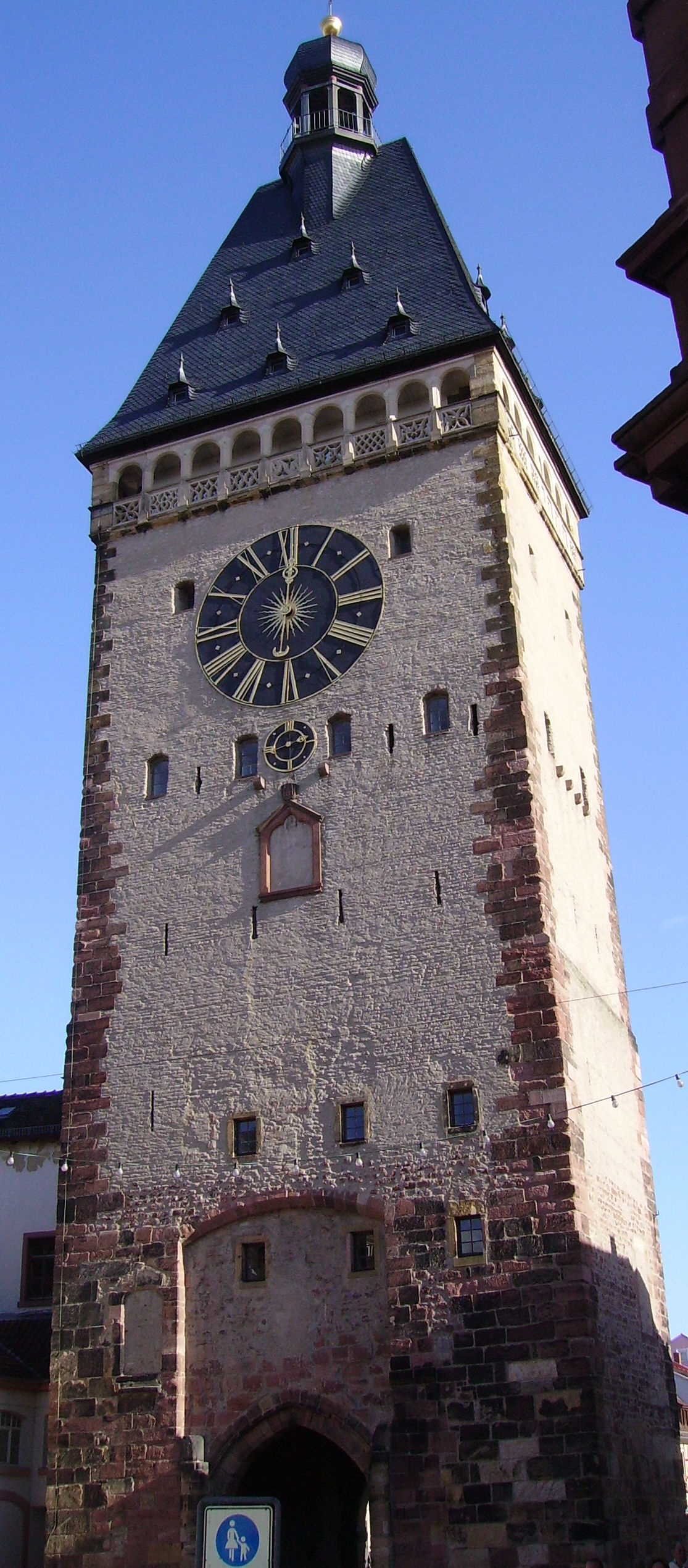
Westside

The old gate was constructed to mark the end of a "Via Triumphalis" that led from the cathedral to the city walls. On major religious occasions, the Emperor and his court would enter the city through the gate and proceed along this roadway—which was 25 to 30 m (80 to 100 ft) wide and 700 m (2,300 ft) long—to the cathedral.

For security reasons, the only openings on the gate's west side are two rows of embrasures. The eastern side is more finely crafted. Above the gate's archway, there is a walkway around the tower. From that walkway, it is possible to see ten stone brackets that project from the wall itself; these once connected the gate to the walls on the north and south sides of the Old Gate.

== Calibration Shoe of Speyer ==
Until the beginning of the 19th century, Speyer had its own units for length and mass. On the northern side of the passage through the Old Gate hangs an iron bar, known as the "Calibration Shoe of Speyer" (Speyerer Werkschuh). This 28.899-centimetre-long (11.378 in) bar, subdivided into twelve (local) inches, was available for any merchant in Speyer to use. Between 1772 and 1773, Senator Johannes Becker used it to measure the size of the city, including the four communities outside the walls.
