= Old Gate (Jerusalem) =

The Old Gate is one of the many gates of the wall of Jerusalem, located on the northern side. It was repaired by the Jebusites during the wall rebuilding in the Book of Nehemiah. In some versions the gate is called "the Jeshanah Gate", which translates to "the old gate".

- Nehemiah 3:6 it is said to have been built by Joiada son of Paseah and Meshullam son of Besodeiah.

"Moreover the old gate repaired Jehoiada the son of Paseah, and Meshullam the son of Besodeiah; they laid the beams thereof, and set up the doors thereof, and the locks thereof, and the bars thereof".

- Nehemiah 12:39 it is listed among the gates the choir procession passed over as they circled the city in celebration
