= Rhythmical office =

Section of Catholic liturgy

In the liturgy of the Roman Catholic Church, a rhythmical office is a section of or a whole religious service, in which not only the hymns are regulated by a certain rhythm, but where, with the exception of the psalms and lessons, practically all the other parts show metre, rhythm, or rhyme. They are also known as versified office or, if appropriate, rhymed office.

The usual examples are liturgical horary prayer, the canonical hours of the priest, or an office of the Breviary. The rhythmical parts will be, for instance: the antiphons to each psalm; to the Magnificat, Invitatorium, and Benedictus; likewise the responses and versicles to the prayers, and after each of the nine lessons; quite often also the benedictions before the lessons; and the antiphons to the minor Horœ (Prime, Terce, Sext, and None).

== Terminology ==
The old technical term for such an office was Historia, with or without an additional "rhytmata" or rimata, an expression that frequently caused misunderstanding on the part of later writers. The reason for the name lay in the fact that originally the antiphons or the responses, and sometimes the two together, served to amplify or comment upon the history of a saint, of which there was a brief sketch in the readings of the second nocturn.

Gradually this name was transferred to offices in which no word was said about a "history", giving rise for instance to the expression "Historia ss. Trinitatis". The structure of the ordinary office of the Breviary in which antiphons, psalms, hymns, lessons, and responses followed one another in fixed order, was the natural form for the rhythmical office. It was not a question of inventing something new, as with the hymns, sequences, or other kinds of poetry, but of creating a text in poetic form in the place of a text in prose form, where the scheme existed, definitely arranged in all its parts. A development that could eventually be a basis for division of the rhythmical offices into distinct classes is limited to a narrow field, namely the external form of the parts of the office as they appear in poetic garb. Here the following characters appear in historical order:

- (1) a metrical, of hexameters intermixed with prose or rhymed prose;
- (2) a rhythmical, in the broadest sense, which will be explained below;
- (3) a form embellished by strict rhythm and rhyme.

Consequently, one may distinguish three classes of rhythmical offices:

- (1) metrical offices, in hexameters or distichs;
- (2) offices in rhymed prose, i. e., offices with very free and irregular rhythm, or with dissimilar assonant long lines;
- (3) rhymed offices with regular rhythm and harmonious artistic structure.

The second class represents a state of transition, wherefore the groups may be called those of the first epoch, the groups of the transition period, and those of the third epoch, in the same way as with the sequences, although with the latter the characteristic difference is much more pronounced. If one desires a general name for all three groups, the expression "Rhymed Office", as suggested by "Historia rimata"" would be quite appropriate for the pars major et potior, which includes the best and most artistic offices; this designation: "gereimtes Officium" (Reimofficium) has been adopted in Germany through the "Analecta Hymnica". Reslly, though, the first and oldest offices are without rhyme, and cannot very well be called rhymed offices.

In the Middle Ages the word "rhythmical" was used as the general term for any kind of poetry to be distinguished from prose, no matter whether there was regular rhythm in those poems or not. And for that reason it is practical to comprise in the name "rhythmical offices" all those other than pure prose, a designation that corresponds to the Historia rhytmata.

Apart from the predilection of the Middle Ages for the poetic form, the Vitœ metricœ of the saints were the point of departure and motive for the rhythmical offices. Those Vitœ were frequently composed in hexameters or distichs. From them various couples of hexameters or a distich were taken to be used as antiphon or response respectively. In case the hexameters of the Vitœ metricœ did not prove suitable enough, the lacking parts of the office were supplemented by simple prose or by means of verses in rhymed prose, i. e., by text lines of different length in which there was very little of rhythm, but simply assonance. Such offices are often a motley mixture of hexameters, rhythmical stanzas, stanzas in pure prose, and again in rhymed prose.

== Examples ==
An example of an old metrical office, intermixed with Prose Responses, is that of St. Lambert (Anal. Hymn., XXVII, no. 79), where all the antiphons are borrowed from that saint's Vitœ metricœ, presumably the work of Hucbald of St. Amand; the office itself was composed by Bishop Stephen of Liège about the end of the ninth century:

Antiphona I:

Orbita solaris præsentia gaudia confert Præsulis eximii Lantberti gesta revolvens.

Antiphona II:

Hic fuit ad tempus Hildrici regis in aula,
Dilectus cunctis et vocis famine dulcis.

A mixing of hexameters, of rhythmical stanzas, and of stanzas formed by unequal lines in rhymed prose is shown in the old Office of Rictrudis, composed by Hucbald about 907 (Anal. Hymn., XIII, no. 87).

Regular hexameters

Rictrudis sponso sit laus et gloria, Christo,
Pro cuius merito iubilemus ei vigilando.

Rhythmical

Beata Dei famula
Rictrudis, adhuc posita
In terris, mente devota
Christo hærebat in æhra.

Free rhythm

Hæc femina laudabilis
Meritisque honorabilis
Rictrudis egregia
Divina providentia
Pervenit in Galliam,
Præclaris orta natalibus,
Honestis alta et instituta moribus.

From the metrical offices, from the pure as well as from those mixed with rhymed prose, the transition was soon made to such as consisted of rhymed prose merely. An example of this kind is in the Offices of Ulrich, composed by Abbot Berno of Reichenau (d. 1048); the antiphon to the Magnificat of the first Vespers begins thus:

Venerandi patris Wodalrici sollemnia
Magnæ jucunditatis repræsentant gaudia,
Quæ merito cleri suscipiuntur voto
Ac populi celebrantur tripudio.
Lætetur tellus tali compta præsule,
Exsultet polus tanto ditatus compare;
Solus dæmon ingemat, qui ad eius sepulcrum
Suum assidue perdit dominium ... etc.

Much more perfectly developed on the other hand, is the rhythm in the Office, which Leo IX composed in honour of Gregory the Great (Anal. Hymn., V, no. 64). This office, the work of a pope, appeared in the eleventh century in the Roman breviaries, and soon enjoyed widespread circulation; all its verses are iambic dimeters, but the rhythm does not as yet coincide with the natural accent of the word, and many a verse has a syllable in excess or a syllable wanting. For example, the first antiphon of the first nocturn:

Gregorius ortus Romæ
E senatorum sanguine
Fulsit mundo velut gemma
Auro superaddita,
Dum præclarior præclaris
Hic accessit atavis.

This transitional author does not make use of pure rhyme, only of assonance, the precursor of rhyme.

A prominent example is the Office of the Trinity by Archbishop Pecham of Canterbury.

The first Vespers begins with the antiphons:

Sedenti super solium
Congratulans trishagium
Seraphici clamoris
Cum patre laudat filium
Indifferens principium
Reciproci amoris.

Sequamur per suspirium,
Quod geritur et gaudium
In sanctis cæli choris;
Levemus cordis studium
In trinum lucis radium
Splendoris et amoris.

Compare with the preceding the antiphons to the first nocturn, which have quite a different structure; the third of them is:

Leventur cordis ostia:
Memoria Giguenti
Nato intelligentia,
Voluntas Procedenti.

Again, the first response to the third nocturn:

Candor lucis, perpurum speculum
Patris splendor, perlustrans sæculum,
Nubis levis intrans umbraculum
In Ægypti venit ergastulum.
Virgo circumdedit virum
Mel mandentem et butyrum.

upon which follows as second response the picture of the Trinity in the following form:

A Veterani facie manavit ardens fiuvius:
Antiquus est ingenitus, et facies est Filius,
Ardoris fluxus Spiritus, duorum amor medius.
Sic olim multifarie
Prophetis luxit Trinitas,
Quam post pandit ecclesiæ
In carne fulgens veritas.

== History ==
It is unclear which of the three old abbeys, Prüm Abbey, Landévennec Abbey or Saint-Amand Abbey, can claim priority in composing a rhythmical office. There is no doubt however from Saint-Amand and the monasteries in Hainault, Flanders, and Brabant, came the real starting-point of this style of poetry, as long ago as the ninth century. A pioneer in music, the Monk Hucbald of Saint-Amand, composed at least two, probably four, rhythmical offices; and the larger number of the older offices were used liturgically in those monasteries and cities with a connexion with Saint-Amand. From there this new branch of hymnody very soon found its way to France, and was developed in the tenth and eleventh, and particularly in the twelfth and thirteenth centuries.

Poets involved are:

- the Abbots Odo of Cluny (927-42) and Odilo of Cluny (994-1049);
- Bishop Fulbert of Chartres (1017–28);
- the Benedictine Monk Odorannus of Sens (died 1045);
- Pope Leo IX (died 1054);
- Bishop Stephen of Tournai (1192–1203);
- Archdeacon Rainald of St. Maurice in Angers (died about 1074);
- Bishop Richard de Gerberoy of Amiens (1204–10);
- Prior Arnaud du Prè of Toulouse (died 1306);
- The General of the Dominican Order, Martialis Auribelli, who in 1456 wrote a rhymed office for the purpose of glorifying Vincent Ferrer.

Julian von Speyer was director of the orchestra at the Frankish royal court, afterwards Franciscan friar and choir master in the Paris convent, where about 1240 he composed words and music for the two well-known offices in honour of Francis of Assisi and of Anthony of Padua (Anal. Hymn., V, nos. 61 and 42). These two productions served as a prototype for a good number of successive offices in honour of saints of the Franciscan Order as well as of others. In Germany the rhymed offices were just as popular as in France. As early as in the ninth century an office, in honour of St. Chrysantus and Daria, had its origin probably in Prüm, perhaps through Friar Wandalbert (Anal. Hymn, XXV, no. 73); perhaps not much later through Abbot Gurdestin of Landévennec a similar poem in honour of St. Winwalœus (Anal. Hymn., XVIII, no. 100). As hailing from Germany two other composers of rhythmical offices in the earlier period have become known: Abbot Berno of Reichenau (died 1048) and Abbot Udalschalc of Maischach at Augsburg (died 1150).

The other German poets whose names can be given belong to a period as late as the fifteenth century, as e. g. Provost Lippold of Steinberg and Bishop Johann Hofmann of Meissen. England took an early part in this style of poetry, but most of the offices that originated there have been lost. Archbishop Pecham's office of the Trinity has been discussed above. Next to him are worthy of mention Cardinal Adam Easton (died 1397) and the Carmelite John Horneby of Lincoln, who about 1370 composed a rhymed office in honour of the Holy Name of Jesus, and of the Visitation of Our Lady.

Italy seems to have a relatively small representation; the Roman Breviary did not favour innovations, and consequently was reluctant to adopt rhythmical offices. Archbishop Alfons of Salerno (1058–85) is presumably the oldest Italian poet of this kind. Besides him there are Abbot Reinaldus de Colle di Mezzo (twelfth century), and the General of the Dominicans, Raymundus de Vineis from Capua (fourteenth century). In Sicily and in Spain the rhymed offices were popular and quite numerous, but with the exception of the Franciscan Fra Gil de Zamora, who about the middle of the fifteenth century composed an office in honour of the Blessed Virgin (Anal. Hymn., XVII, no. 8) it has been impossible to cite by name from those two countries any other poet who took part in composing rhythmical offices.

Towards the close of the thirteenth century, Scandinavia also comes to the fore with rhymed offices, with Bishop Brynolphus of Skara (1278–1317), Archbishop Birgerus Gregorii of Upsala (died 1383), Bishop Nicolaus of Linköping (1374–91), and Johannes Benechini of Oeland (about 1440).

The number of offices where the composer's name is known is insignificantly small. No less than seven hundred anonymous rhythmical offices were brought to light through the "Analecta Hymnica". Artistically they vary widely.
